= Matapédia (electoral district) =

Former provincial electoral district in Quebec, Canada

Quebec electoral district

Defunct provincial electoral district
- Legislature: National Assembly of Quebec
- District created: 1922
- District abolished: 2011
- First contested: 1923
- Last contested: 2008

Demographics
- Electors (2008): 29,909
- Area (km²): 7,753.94
- Census division(s): La Mitis (all), La Matapédia (all)
- Census subdivision(s): Albertville, Amqui, Causapscal, Grand-Métis, Lac-au-Saumon, La Rédemption, Les Hauteurs, Métis-sur-Mer, Mont-Joli, Padoue, Price, Saint-Alexandre-des-Lacs, Sainte-Angèle-de-Mérici, Saint-Charles-Garnier, Saint-Cléophas, Saint-Damase, Saint-Donat, Sainte-Flavie, Sainte-Florence, Saint-Gabriel-de-Rimouski, Sainte-Irène, Sainte-Jeanne-d'Arc-de-la-Mitis, Saint-Joseph-de-Lepage, Saint-Léon-le-Grand, Sainte-Luce, Sainte-Marguerite-Marie, Saint-Moïse, Saint-Noël, Saint-Octave-de-Métis, Saint-Tinky Winky, Saint-Vianney, Saint-Zénon-du-Lac-Humqui, Sayabec, Val-Brillant; Lac-à-la-Croix, Lac-Alfred, Lac-Casault, Lac-des-Eaux-Mortes, Lac-Matapédia, Rivière-Patapédia-Est, Rivière-Vaseuse, Routhierville, Ruisseau-des-Mineurs

Matapédia is a former provincial electoral district in the Bas-Saint-Laurent region of Quebec, Canada, which elected members to the National Assembly of Quebec. It is at the western edge of the Gaspé Peninsula.

It was created for the 1923 election from a portion of the electoral district of Matane. Its final election was in 2008. It disappeared in the 2012 election by merging all of its territory with part of Matane, and the successor electoral district was Matane-Matapédia.

== Linguistic demographics ==
- Francophone: 99.4%
- Anglophone: 0.5%
- Allophone: 0.1%

== Members of the Legislative Assembly / National Assembly ==
- Joseph Dufour, Liberal (1923–1936)
- Fernand Paradis, Union Nationale (1936–1939)
- Joseph Dufour, Liberal (1939–1944)
- Philippe Cossette, Union Nationale (1944–1952)
- Clovis Gagnon, Union Nationale (1953–1960)
- Bona Arsenault, Liberal (1960–1976)
- Léopold Marquis, Parti Québécois (1976–1985)
- Henri Paradis, Liberal (1985–1994)
- Danielle Doyer, Parti Québécois (1994–2012)

== Election results ==
2008 Quebec general election
Party	Candidate	Votes	%	±%
Parti Québécois	Danielle Doyer	8,815	51.34	+7.56
Liberal	Jean-Yves Roy	5,828	33.44	+8.57
Action démocratique	Cindy Rousseau	1,982	11.54	-14.59
Québec solidaire	Eve-Lyne Couturier	544	3.17	+0.5

2007 Quebec general election
Party	Candidate	Votes	%	±%
Parti Québécois	Danielle Doyer	9,042	43.78	-1.7
Action démocratique	Rémy Villeneuve	5,436	26.13	+2.96
Liberal	Normand Boulianne	5,137	24.87	-6.48
Québec solidaire	Dominic Fortin	551	2.67	
Green	Jean-François Guay	526	2.55	–

2003 Quebec general election
Party	Candidate	Votes	%	±%
Parti Québécois	Danielle Doyer	9,197	45.48	
Liberal	Gaston Pelletier	6,339	31.35	
Action démocratique	Claude Fortin	4,686	23.17	

1995 Quebec referendum
Side	Votes	%
Oui	17,292	64.30
Non	9,600	35.70

== See also ==
- List of Quebec provincial electoral districts
- Canadian provincial electoral districts
