= Zec de la Rivière-Mitis =

- Location within Quebec
- Location: Canada, Quebec, La Mitis Regional County Municipality
- Coordinates: 48°26′23″N 67°59′20″W
- Area: Length of 43.9 kilometres (27.3 mi)
- Established: 1993
- Governing body: La corporation de gestion de la pêche sportive de la rivière Mitis (CGPSRM)

Zec de la Rivière-Mitis is a "zone d'exploitation contrôlée" (controlled harvesting zone) (zec) located in the municipality of Sainte-Jeanne-d'Arc-de-la-Mitis, in La Mitis Regional County Municipality, in administrative region of Bas-Saint-Laurent, in Québec, in Canada.

The course of Mitis River and Mistigougèche River have the status de zec de la Rivière-Mitis. This salmon river is administered by "La corporation de gestion de la pêche sportive de la rivière Mitis (CGPSRM)", which was established in 1993. The mandate was assigned to this Association by the Government of Quebec. The mission of the zec is oriented to exploitation and conservation of salmon of Atlantique.

== Geography ==
Mitis rivers takes it source from a large body of water consisting of a series of four lakes continues in form of a crescent turned to the southwest: "lac Inférieur" (Lower Lake), "lac à la Croix" (Lake of the Cross), Mitis Lake and "lac Supérieur" (Superior Lake). The latter being the southernmost receives water from the Patapédia East River which defines a segment of boundary between the Quebec and New Brunswick. This series of lakes is located in the administrative region of Gaspésie, on the border of the region of Bas-Saint-Laurent.

The Mitis dam is built at the mouth of "lac inférieur" (Lower Lake), located at the west end, near the hamlet of Lac-Mitis. Mitis River begins at the mouth of "lac Inférieur". Going down the river gets water from several tributaries, increasing its flow. Those tributaries are:

- East side: Saint-Pierre River, Rouge River, Thibeault Creek;
- West side: Grassy Creek, Mistigougèche River, Rouge River, "Seven Lakes Creek" and "Jaune" (Yellow).

Mitis River flows from south to north in a narrow valley surrounded by mountains, up to Sainte-Angèle-de-Merici. Then the river flows through agricultural and forest environments. Mitis River continues its course winding through the municipality of Price. Dams of "Mitis-One" and "Mitis-Deux", located on the border of the municipalities of Sainte-Flavie and Grand-Métis near Mont-Joli harness the river near its mouth. After a descent of 74 kilometres (46 mi), the river flows into the Gulf of St. Lawrence in the Mitis Bay, protected by a headland, named the "Pointe aux Cennelles" in Sainte-Flavie .

La Mitis River and upper lakes pass through the territories of municipalities of (from the mouth): Sainte-Flavie, Saint-Joseph-de-Lepage, Sainte-Angele-de-Mérici, Sainte-Jeanne-d'Arc-de-la-Mitis, La Rédemption, Saint-Charles-Garnier, Lac-Alfred, Lac-à-la-Croix (La Mitis), unorganized territoryof Rivière-Vaseuse, unorganized territory of Lac-des-Eaux-Mortes, Ruisseau-Ferguson and northeast of the New Brunswick. The entrance station of Zec de la Rivière-Mitis is located in Sainte-Angèle-de-Mérici near the route 132.

== Salmon fishing ==
In Quebec, salmon populations have been identified in 109 rivers and five tributaries in Quebec. Since July 23, 2014 data, the law requires fishermen to apply the thought to water all large salmon caught. This policy aims to preserve the great sires for sustainable development.

Mitis River has 33 salmon pools, between the mouth of the Rouge River and the "lac inférieur" (Lac Mitis). The river has a stony bed, made of stone and rock; what constitutes ideal conditions for the salmon run. In the area of the ZEC, salmon fishing is done by wading.

== See also ==
- La Mitis Regional County Municipality
- Bas-Saint-Laurent, administrative region of Quebec
- Mitis River
- Sainte-Flavie, municipality
- Saint-Joseph-de-Lepage, municipality
- Sainte-Angèle-de-Mérici, municipality
- Sainte-Jeanne-d'Arc-de-la-Mitis, municipality
- La Rédemption, municipality
- Saint-Charles-Garnier, municipality
- Lac-Alfred, municipality
- Lac-à-la-Croix (La Mitis), unorganized territory
- Zone d'exploitation contrôlée (controlled harvesting zone) (zec)
