= Miti =

Miti or MITI may refer to:

== People ==
- Michela Miti (born 1963), Italian actress and television presenter
- Mwape Miti (born 1973), Zambian footballer

== Other uses ==
- Miti, Estonia, a village
- Ministry of International Trade and Industry in Japan, now part of the Ministry of Economy, Trade and Industry
- Ministry of International Trade and Industry (Malaysia)
- Mohawk Innovative Technology, an American company
- Qualified Member of the Institute of Translation and Interpreting

== See also ==
- Mitis (disambiguation)
