= Mitis =

Mitis may refer to:

- La Mitis, a Regional County Municipality in Quebec, Canada
- Mitis River, a river in Matapedia Valley, Quebec, Canada
- Mitis Lake, a lake of the Zec de la Rivière-Mitis in Quebec, Canada
- MitiS, American musician and producer
