= Matane-Matapédia-Mitis =

Provincial electoral district in Quebec, Canada

Quebec electoral district

Provincial electoral district
- Legislature: National Assembly of Quebec
MNA
Pascal Bérubé
Parti Québécois
- District created: 2011
- First contested: 2012
- Last contested: 2026

Demographics
- Electors (2012): 47,475
- Area (km²): 14,143.4
- Census division(s): La Matapédia, La Mitis, Matane
- Census subdivision(s): Albertville, Amqui, Baie-des-Sables, Causapscal, Grand-Métis, Grosses-Roches, La Rédemption, Lac-au-Saumon, Les Hauteurs, Les Méchins, Matane, Métis-sur-Mer, Mont-Joli, Padoue, Price, Saint-Adelme, Saint-Alexandre-des-Lacs, Sainte-Angèle-de-Mérici, Saint-Charles-Garnier, Saint-Cléophas, Saint-Damase, Saint-Donat, Sainte-Félicité, Sainte-Flavie, Sainte-Florence, Saint-Gabriel-de-Rimouski, Sainte-Irène, Saint-Jean-de-Cherbourg, Sainte-Jeanne-d'Arc-de-la-Mitis, Saint-Joseph-de-Lepage, Saint-Léandre, Saint-Léon-le-Grand, Sainte-Luce, Sainte-Marguerite-Marie, Saint-Moïse, Saint-Noël, Saint-Octave-de-Métis, Sainte-Paule, Saint-René-de-Matane, Saint-Tharcisius, Saint-Ulric, Saint-Vianney, Saint-Zénon-du-Lac-Humqui, Sayabec, Val-Brillant; Lac-à-la-Croix, Lac-Alfred, Lac-Casault, Lac-des-Eaux-Mortes, Lac-Matapédia, Rivière-Bonjour, Rivière-Patapédia-Est, Rivière-Vaseuse, Routhierville, Ruisseau-des-Mineurs

Matane-Matapédia-Mitis (formerly Matane-Matapédia; French pronunciation: [matan matapedja]) is a provincial electoral district in the Bas-Saint-Laurent region of Quebec, Canada, that elects members to the National Assembly of Quebec. It includes the municipalities of Matane, Mont-Joli, Amqui, Sainte-Luce, Causapscal, Price, Sayabec, Saint-Ulric, Lac-au-Saumon, and Saint-Gabriel-de-Rimouski.

It was created for the 2012 election from part of the former Matane and all of the former Matapédia electoral districts.

== Members of the National Assembly ==
Legislature	Years	Member	Party
Riding created from Matane and Matapédia
40th	2012–2014	Pascal Bérubé	Parti Québécois
41st	2014–2018	Pascal Bérubé	Parti Québécois
42nd	2018–2022	Pascal Bérubé	Parti Québécois
43rd	2022–2026	Pascal Bérubé	Parti Québécois
Matane-Matapédia-Mitis
44th	2026–Present	Pascal Bérubé	Parti Québécois

== Election results ==
2026 Quebec general election
** Preliminary results — Not yet official **
Party	Candidate	Votes	%	±%
Parti Québécois	Pascal Bérubé	19,801	67.83	
Conservative	Patrice Caron	3,867	13.25	
Liberal	André Côté	1,974	6.76	
Coalition Avenir Québec	Henry Maclaren	1,927	6.60	
Québec solidaire	Gabriel Plante	1,347	4.61	
Parti nul	Alexandre Mari0 Br0s Cossette	174	0.60	
Démocratie directe	Michel Lefrancois	103	0.35	
Total valid votes				
Total rejected ballots				
Turnout			63.42	
Electors on the lists			–	–
Source: Élections Québec

2022 Quebec general election: Matane-Matapédia
Party	Candidate	Votes	%	±%
Parti Québécois	Pascal Bérubé	20,057	67.43	–2.03
Coalition Avenir Québec	Jean-Sébastien Barriault	5,163	17.36	+6.00
Conservative	Alexandre Leblanc	2,316	7.79	+7.26
Québec solidaire	Marie-Phare Boucher	1,450	4.87	–0.91
Liberal	Harley Ryan Lounsbury	637	2.14	–9.13
L'Union fait la force	Madeleine Rose	123	0.41	New
Total valid votes		29,746	98.98	
Total rejected ballots		307	1.02	+0.25
Turnout		30,053	64.93	–0.45
Electors on the lists		46,286		
Parti Québécois hold		Swing		–4.02
Source: Élections Québec

2018 Quebec general election: Matane-Matapédia
Party	Candidate	Votes	%	±%
Parti Québécois	Pascal Bérubé	20,658	69.46	+8.3
Coalition Avenir Québec	Mathieu Quenum	3,379	11.36	+1.12
Liberal	Annie Fournier	3,351	11.27	-11.5
Québec solidaire	Marie-Phare Boucher	1,718	5.78	+0.65
Green	Pierre-Luc Coulombe	358	1.2	
Conservative	Paul-Émile Vignola	159	0.53	
Citoyens au pouvoir	Jocelyn Rioux	118	0.4	
Total valid votes		29,741	99.23	
Total rejected ballots		230	0.77	
Turnout		29,971	65.38	
Eligible voters		45,840		
Parti Québécois hold		Swing		+3.59
Source(s) "Rapport des résultats officiels du scrutin". Élections Québec.

2014 Quebec general election
Party	Candidate	Votes	%	±%
Parti Québécois	Pascal Bérubé	18,025	61.16	+2.17
Liberal	Dave Gravel	6,712	22.77	+4.09
Coalition Avenir Québec	Yann Gobeil-Nadon	3,019	10.24	-5.67
Québec solidaire	Gérald Tremblay	1,511	5.13	0.00
Option nationale	Joëlle Vadeboncoeur Harrison	207	0.70	-0.61
Total valid votes		29,474	98.49	–
Total rejected ballots		453	1.51	–
Turnout		29,927	63.00	–
Electors on the lists		47,356	–	–

2012 Quebec general election
Party	Candidate	Votes	%	±%
Parti Québécois	Pascal Bérubé	19,768	58.99	–
Liberal	Jean-Clément Ouellet	6,263	18.69	–
Coalition Avenir Québec	Pierre D'Amours	5,332	15.91	–
Québec solidaire	Diane Bélanger	1,230	3.67	–
Option nationale	Geneviève Allard	440	1.31	–
Green	Lise Deschênes	348	1.04	–
Équipe Autonomiste	Pascal Gauthier	127	0.38	–
Total valid votes		33,508	99.17	–
Total rejected ballots		280	0.83	–
Turnout		33,788	70.96	–
Electors on the lists		47,613	–	–

== See also ==
- List of Quebec provincial electoral districts
- Canadian provincial electoral districts
