= Lac-Casault =

- Unorganized territory
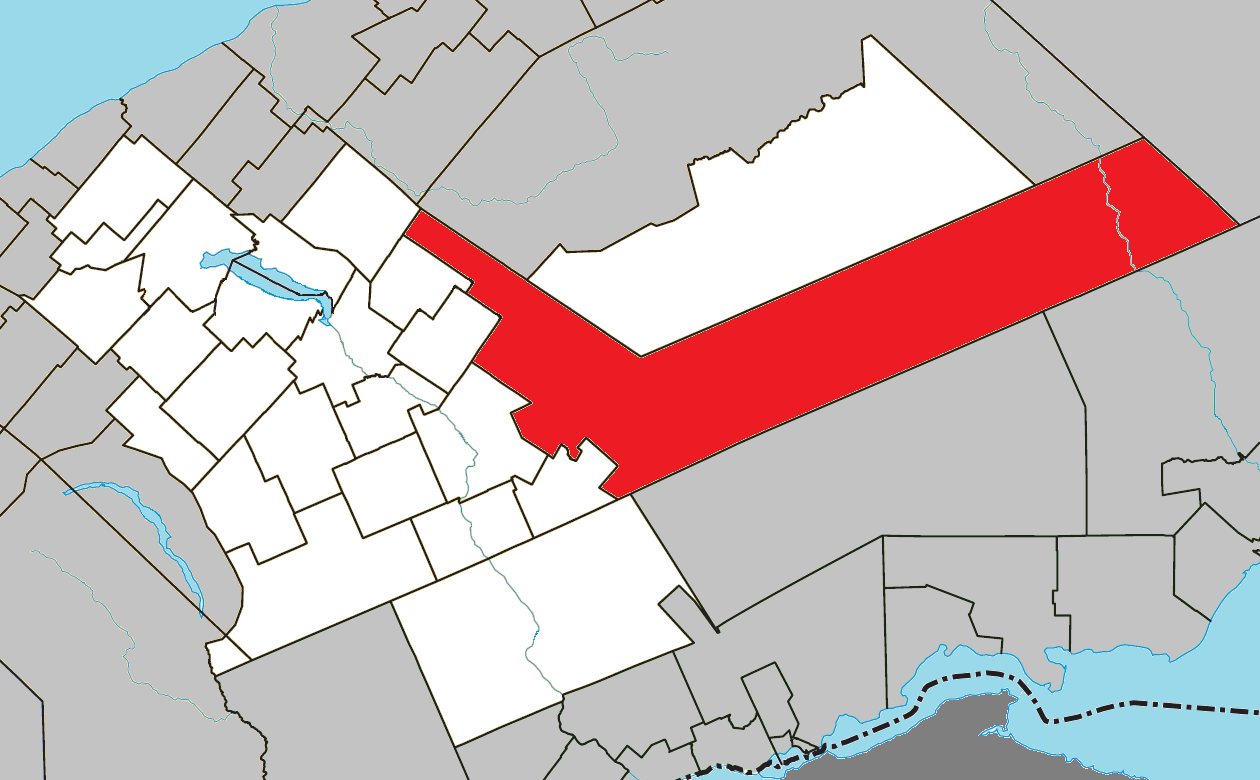
- Location within La Matapédia RCM

- Location in eastern Quebec
- Coordinates: 48°30′N 67°09′W
- Country: Canada
- Province: Quebec
- Region: Bas-Saint-Laurent
- RCM: La Matapédia
- Constituted: unspecified

Government
  - Fed. riding: Rimouski-Neigette—Mitis—Matapédia—Les Basques
  - Prov. riding: Matane-Matapédia-Mitis

Area
  - Total: 1,435.27 km^{2} (554.16 sq mi)
  - Land: 1,428.21 km^{2} (551.43 sq mi)

Population (2021)
  - Total: 10
  - Density: 0/km^{2} (0/sq mi)
  - Change 2016–21: ▲ N/A
  - Dwellings: 142
- Time zone: UTC−05:00 (EST)
  - Summer (DST): UTC−04:00 (EDT)
- Highways: R-299

Lac-Casault (French pronunciation: [lak kazo]) is an unorganized territory in the Bas-Saint-Laurent region of Quebec, Canada.

The small eponymous Lake Casault is located near the village of St-Alexandre-des-Lacs and was named in honour of Louis-Napoléon Casault (1823–1908).

== Demographics ==
Historical census populations – Lac-Casault

Year	Pop.	±%
1976	7	—
1981	2	−71.4%
1986	1	−50.0%
1991	3	+200.0%
1996	0	−100.0%

Year	Pop.	±%
2001	0	0.00%
2006	20	—
2011	5	−75.0%
2016	0	−100.0%
2021	10	—

2021 Population figure based on revised count.
Source: Statistics Canada

Private dwellings occupied by usual residents (2021): 6 (total dwellings: 142)

== See also ==
- List of unorganized territories in Quebec
