= Saint-Cléophas =

- Parish municipality
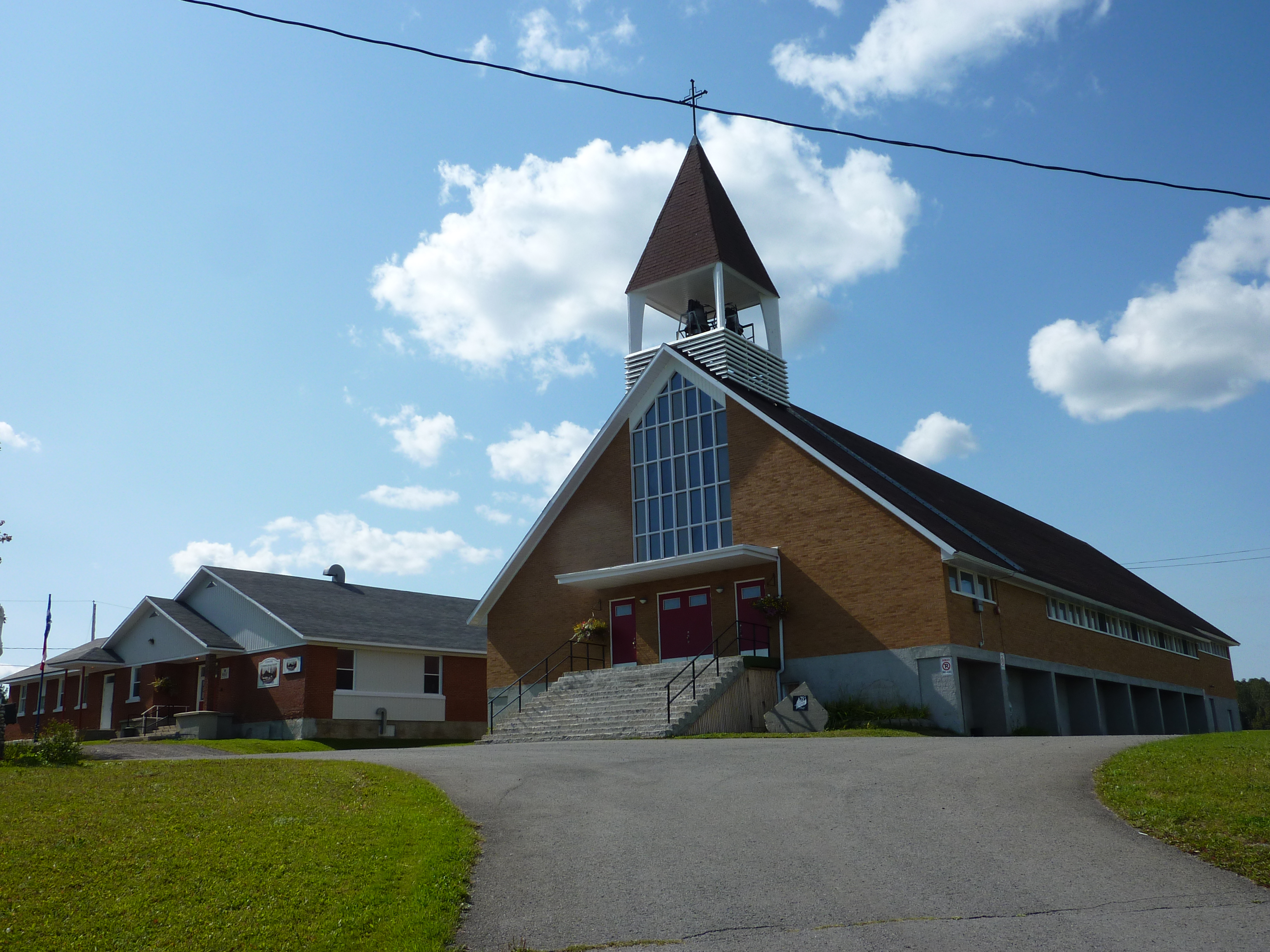
- Motto: Freedom, Love, Work
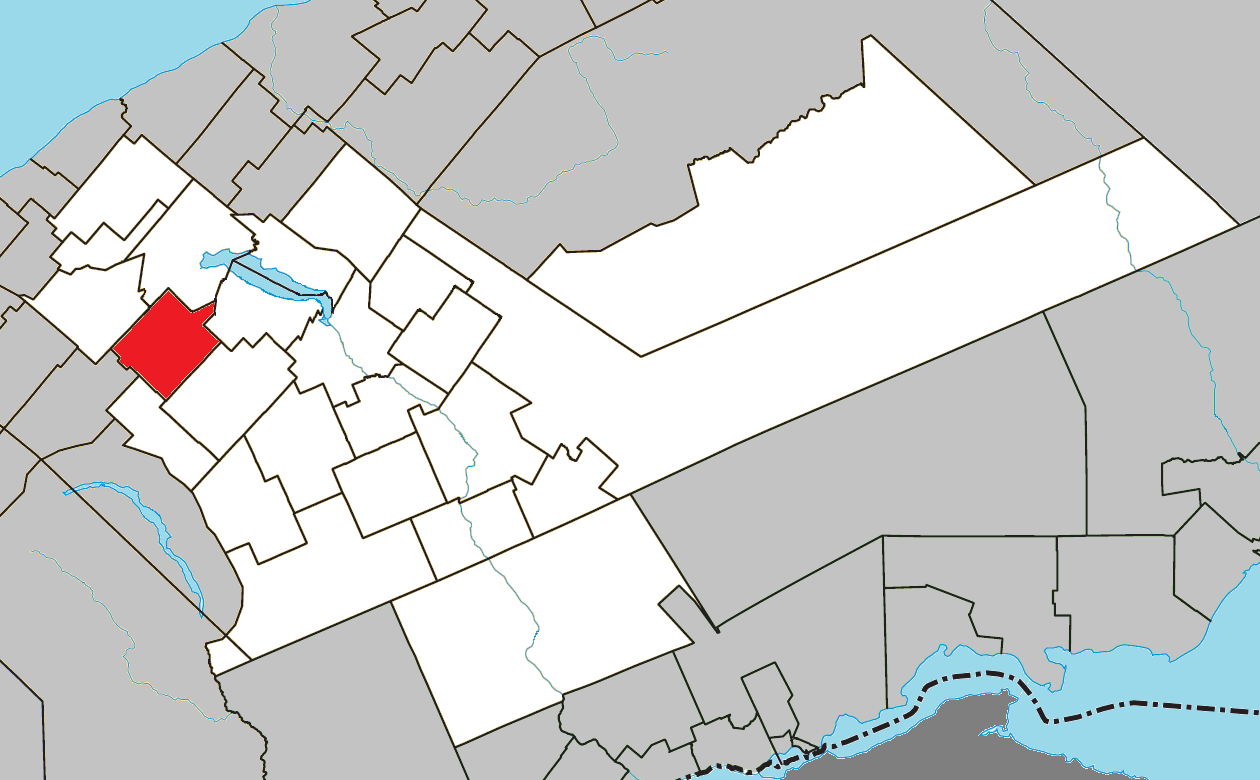
- Location within La Matapédia RCM

- Location in eastern Quebec
- Coordinates: 48°29′N 67°45′W
- Country: Canada
- Province: Quebec
- Region: Bas-Saint-Laurent
- RCM: La Matapédia
- Settled: 1908
- Constituted: May 19, 1921

Government
  - Mayor: Jean-Paul Bélanger
  - Fed. riding: Rimouski-Neigette—Mitis—Matapédia—Les Basques
  - Prov. riding: Matane-Matapédia-Mitis

Area
  - Total: 98.49 km^{2} (38.03 sq mi)
  - Land: 97.22 km^{2} (37.54 sq mi)

Population (2021)
  - Total: 321
  - Density: 3.3/km^{2} (8.5/sq mi)
  - Change 2016-21: ▼3.6%
  - Dwellings: 159
- Time zone: UTC−5 (EST)
  - Summer (DST): UTC−4 (EDT)
- Postal code(s): G0J 3N0
- Area codes: 418, 581
- Highways: No major routes
- Website: stcleophas.com

Saint-Cléophas is a Parish municipality in the regional county municipality of La Matapédia in Quebec (Canada), situated in the administrative region of Bas-Saint-Laurent.

The name chosen for the parish during the municipal erection in 1921, highlights the work of Father Joseph Cleophas Saindon (1866-1941), a priest of the neighbouring parish of Saint-Nom-de-Marie-de-Sayabec from 1896 to 1941, serving the parish from 1918. It is also named in honour of Saint Cleophas.

== History ==
In the early 1900s, the pioneers of Sayabec created the foundations for StCléophas in a town known as Awantjish, which was described as having good soil and timber (especially birch, maple and cedar.) By 1908, a group of settlers living in the territory of what is today St-Cléophas made offerings to the Bishop of Rimouski, Monsignor André-Albert Blais, to found a parish in the area. The prelate had considered that it was a premature gesture due to the low population of the area (about 300 people). Finally the parish opened at the end of the First World War. The mission of St-Cléophas to gain both parish and municipality status became a reality, and in 1921 the town detached from the Municipality of Sayabec. However, the pastor of Sayabec, Father Cléophas Saindon, served as the first pastor at St Cleophas until the vicar of Sayabec, Father Charles Pelletier could become pastor of St-Cléophas. It is also in 1921 that the town began to officially use a calendar to mark milestones.

In 1918 the parish founded the first mission of St-Cléophas. On the 17th of January 1921, the first priest was appointed and so began the canonical life of the parish.

In 1944, the church chapel was burned. That same year, Georges-Émile Côté built a new sawmill. Today, the mill is no longer in operation. In 1973 a zoo was built, the St-Cléophas Ecological Centre, funded through donations from nine parishioners. In 1976 the name St-Cléophas Ecological Centre became known as Naturanimo, which closed 1996.

== Geography ==
The Parish Municipality of Saint-Cléophas is part of the La Matapédia Regional County Municipality in the Bas-Saint-Laurent. The parish of Saint-Céeophas is part of the Archdiocese of Rimouski.

Saint-Cléophas is located on a side of the mountain chain of the Appalachian specifically in the section of Mt Saint-Anne. The municipality is located 8 km south of the Highway 132 through Sayabec on Lacroix Road.

== Demographics ==
In the 2021 Census of Population conducted by Statistics Canada, Saint-Cléophas had a population of 321 living in 145 of its 159 total private dwellings, a change of −3.6% from its 2016 population of 333. With a land area of 97.22 km^{2} (37.54 sq mi), it had a population density of 3.3/km^{2} (8.6/sq mi) in 2021.

Canada census – Saint-Cléophas community profile

	2021	2016	2011
Population	321 (-3.6% from 2016)	333 (-0.3% from 2011)	334 (-9.0% from 2006)
Land area	97.22 km^{2} (37.54 sq mi)	97.44 km^{2} (37.62 sq mi)	97.74 km^{2} (37.74 sq mi)
Population density	3.3/km^{2} (8.5/sq mi)	3.4/km^{2} (8.8/sq mi)	3.4/km^{2} (8.8/sq mi)
Median age	54.4 (M: 54.8, F: 54.4)	50.9 (M: 50.8, F: 51.2)	46.2 (M: 48.5, F: 42.8)
Private dwellings	159 (total) 145 (occupied)	156 (total)	137 (total)
Median household income	$54,400	$45,184	$41,769

Notes: 2011 income data for this area has been suppressed for data quality or confidentiality reasons.
References: 2021 2016 2011

Historical census populations – Saint-Cléophas

Year	Pop.	±%
1931	622	—
1941	759	+22.0%
1951	960	+26.5%
1956	1,017	+5.9%
1961	968	−4.8%
1966	815	−15.8%

Year	Pop.	±%
1971	608	−25.4%
1976	440	−27.6%
1981	427	−3.0%
1986	473	+10.8%
1991	440	−7.0%
1996	404	−8.2%

Year	Pop.	±%
2001	380	−5.9%
2006	367	−3.4%
2011	334	−9.0%
2016	333	−0.3%
2021	321	−3.6%

Source: Statistics Canada

Mother tongue (2021):

- English as first language: 1.6%
- French as first language: 100.0%
- English and French as first language: 0.0%
- Other as first language: 0.0%

== Economy ==
The local economy is mainly based on forestry, sawmills, agriculture and cattle farms of both sheep and dairy. There are also many forests producing maple syrup. In addition, Panval plant in Sayabec provides many jobs.

== Attractions ==
Saint-Cléophas is often visited in spring for its numerous maple groves. Moreover, this is a place for hiking, snowmobile and ATV through its many trails. Between 1973 and 1996, St-Cléophas was a very important tourist attraction in the region with the Naturanimo Centre . The zoo housed mainly Canadian animals. Its varieties of species, its large size, its development and activities such as horse pulls, 4x4, tractors and country meals, added to the popularity of Naturanimo Centre. The municipality is part of the tourist region of Gaspésie–Îles-de-la-Madeleine in the Matapedia Valley.

== Government ==
=== Municipal Council ===
The council consists of a mayor and six councilors who are elected every four year block without territorial division through rotation.

mandate	function	name
2025 - 2029	mayor	Monsieur Jean-Paul Bélanger
2025 - 2029	councillors	
2025 - 2029	#1	Monsieur Bruno Gavin
2025 - 2029	#2	Monsieur Stéphane Boulanger
2025 - 2029	#3	Madame Hélène Dumont
2025 - 2029	#4	Madame Micheline Morin
2025 - 2029	#5	Madame Jacinthe Gauvin
2025 - 2029	#6	Madame Nadine Gagné

List of former mayors:

- Roland Saint-Pierre (-2005)
- Lise Dompierre (2005–2009)
- Jean-Paul Bélanger (2009–present)

=== Political representations ===
Provincially Saint-Cléophas is part of the provincial riding of Matane-Matapédia-Mitis. In the Quebec general election of 2026, the outgoing MNA Pascal Bérubé, from the Parti Québécois was re-elected to represent the people of Saint-Cléophas in the National Assembly of Quebec.

Federally, Saint-Cléophas is part of the federal riding of Rimouski-Neigette—Mitis—Matapédia—Les Basques (named Rimouski—La Matapédia between 2025 to 2026). In the 2025 Canadian federal election, the incumbent Maxime Blanchette-Joncas of the Bloc Québécois was re-elected and began to represent the people of Saint-Cléophas in the House of Commons of Canada after the electoral district of Avignon—La Mitis—Matane—Matapédia was abolished.

== See also ==
- List of parish municipalities in Quebec
- Matapédia, Quebec
- Matapedia Valley
- Matapedia (provincial electoral district)
- Haute-Gaspésie—La Mitis—Matane—Matapédia
