= Rivière-Patapédia-Est =

- Unorganized territory
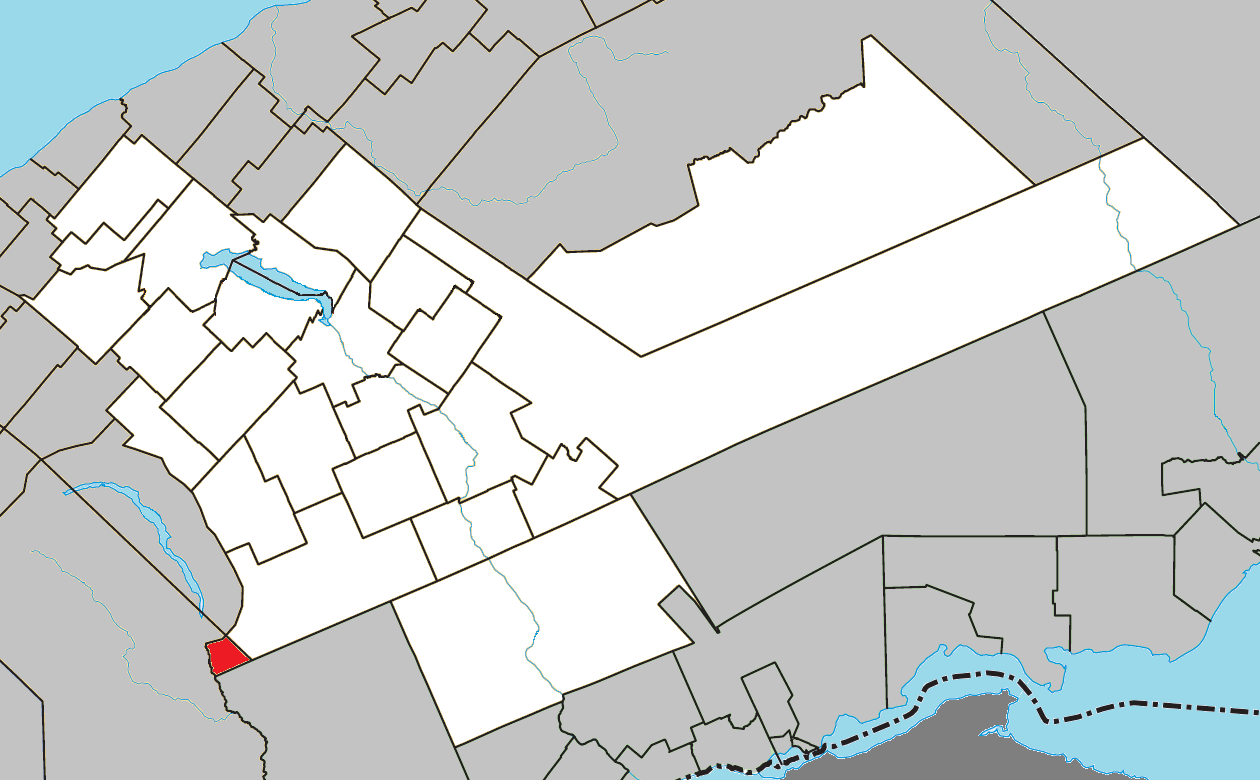
- Location within La Matapédia RCM

- Location in eastern Quebec
- Coordinates: 48°07′N 67°39′W
- Country: Canada
- Province: Quebec
- Region: Bas-Saint-Laurent
- RCM: La Matapédia
- Constituted: January 1, 1986

Government
  - Fed. riding: Rimouski-Neigette—Mitis—Matapédia—Les Basques
  - Prov. riding: Matane-Matapédia-Mitis

Area
  - Total: 15.65 km^{2} (6.04 sq mi)
  - Land: 15.85 km^{2} (6.12 sq mi)
- There is an apparent discrepancy between 2 authoritative sources.

Population (2011)
  - Total: 0
  - Density: 0/km^{2} (0/sq mi)
  - Change 2016-21: N/A
  - Dwellings: 0
- Time zone: UTC-5 (EST)
  - Summer (DST): UTC-4 (EDT)
- Highways: No major routes

Rivière-Patapédia-Est (French pronunciation: [ʁivjɛʁ patapedja ɛst]) is an unorganized territory in the Bas-Saint-Laurent region of Quebec, Canada.

It is named after the East Patapedia River that forms the territory's western boundary. This river is the main outlet of Lake Supérieur and a tributary of the Patapédia River.

== Demographics ==
Historical census populations – Rivière-Patapédia-Est

Year	Pop.	±%
1981	0	—
1986	0	0.00%
1991	0	0.00%
1996	0	0.00%
2001	0	0.00%

Year	Pop.	±%
2006	0	0.00%
2011	0	0.00%
2016	0	0.00%
2021	0	0.00%

Source: Statistics Canada

== See also ==
- List of unorganized territories in Quebec
