= Ruisseau-des-Mineurs =

- Unorganized territory
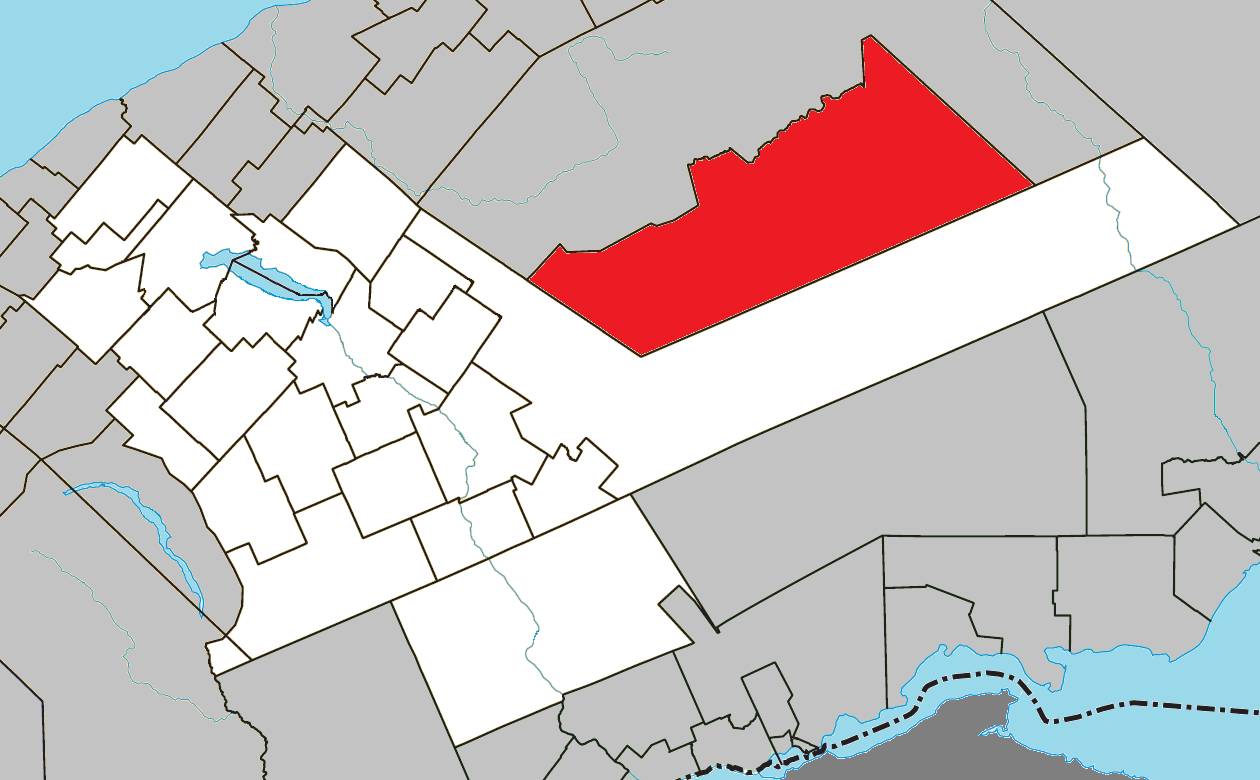
- Location within La Matapédia RCM

- Location in eastern Quebec
- Coordinates: 48°35′N 66°40′W
- Country: Canada
- Province: Quebec
- Region: Bas-Saint-Laurent
- RCM: La Matapédia
- Constituted: January 1, 1986

Government
  - Fed. riding: Rimouski-Neigette—Mitis—Matapédia—Les Basques
  - Prov. riding: Matane-Matapédia-Mitis

Area
  - Total: 939.95 km^{2} (362.92 sq mi)
  - Land: 935.95 km^{2} (361.37 sq mi)

Population (2021)
  - Total: 0
  - Density: 0/km^{2} (0/sq mi)
  - Change 2016-21: N/A
  - Dwellings: 27
- Time zone: UTC-5 (EST)
  - Summer (DST): UTC-4 (EDT)
- Highways: No major routes

Ruisseau-des-Mineurs (French pronunciation: [ʁɥiso de minœʁ]) is an unorganized territory in the Bas-Saint-Laurent region of Quebec, Canada. It is named after the Miners Creek (ruisseau des Mineurs), a tributary of the Cascapédia River via the Branche du Lac River.

The Dunière Wildlife Reserve is located within this territory.

== Demographics ==
Historical census populations – Lac-Casault

Year	Pop.	±%
1991	0	—
1996	0	0.00%
2001	0	0.00%
2006	5	—

Year	Pop.	±%
2011	0	−100.0%
2016	0	0.00%
2021	0	0.00%

2021 Population figure based on revised count.
Source: Statistics Canada

Private dwellings occupied by usual residents (2021): 0 (total dwellings: 27)

== See also ==
- List of unorganized territories in Quebec
