= Sainte-Florence, Quebec =

Sainte-Florence
- Municipality
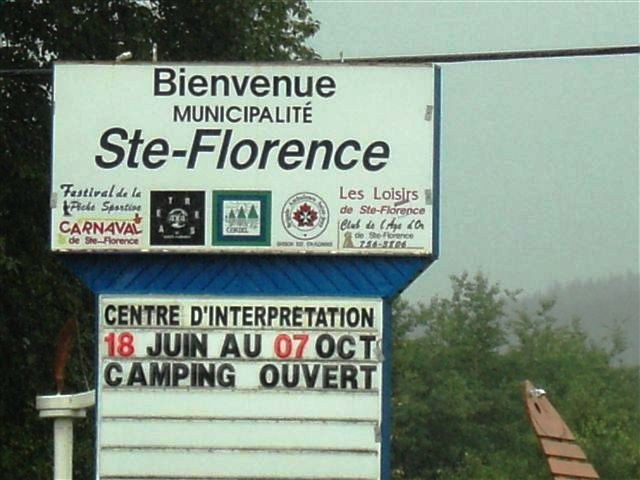
- Motto: Travail, Foi, Honneur
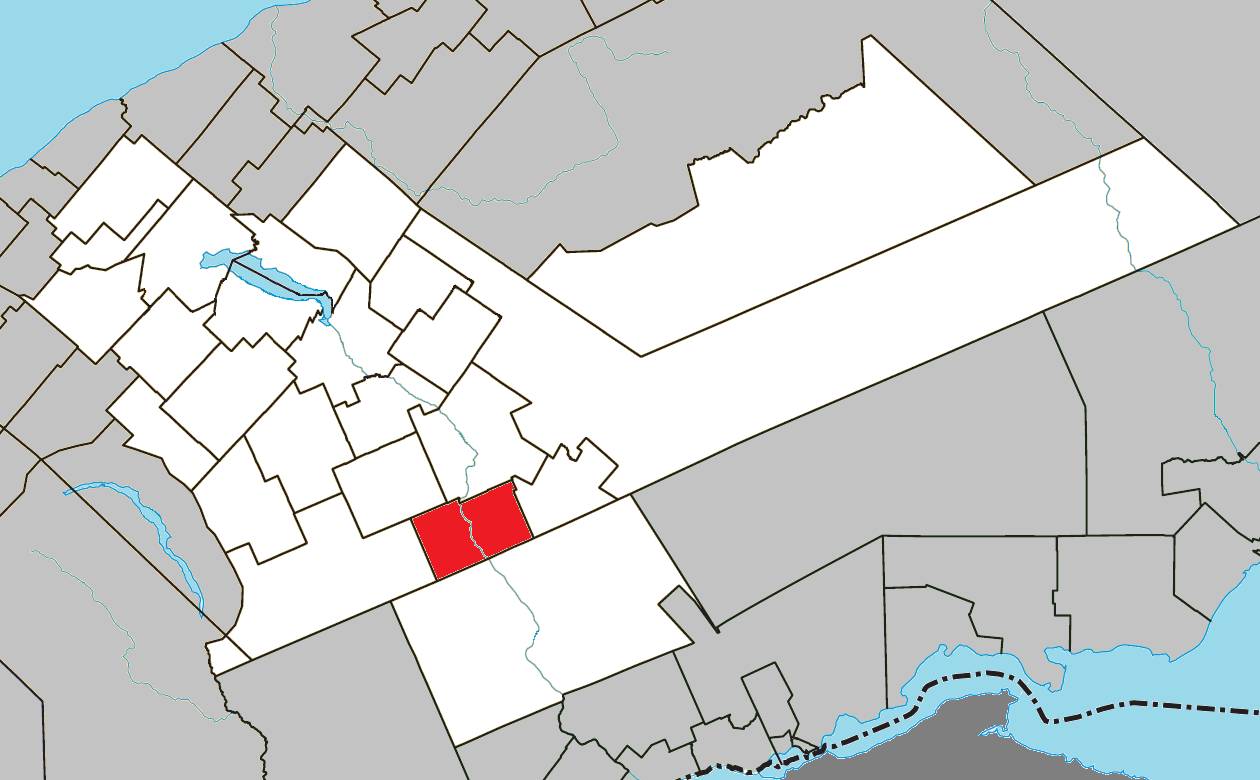
- Location within La Matapédia RCM

- Location in eastern Quebec
- Coordinates: 48°16′N 67°14′W
- Country: Canada
- Province: Quebec
- Region: Bas-Saint-Laurent
- RCM: La Matapédia
- Settled: 1897
- Constituted: April 12, 1911

Government
  - Mayor: Carol Poitras
  - Fed. riding: Rimouski-Neigette—Mitis—Matapédia—Les Basques
  - Prov. riding: Matane-Matapédia-Mitis

Area
  - Total: 103.25 km^{2} (39.87 sq mi)
  - Land: 103.48 km^{2} (39.95 sq mi)
- There is an apparent discrepancy between 2 authoritative sources.

Population (2021)
  - Total: 367
  - Density: 3.5/km^{2} (9.1/sq mi)
  - Pop 2016-2021: ▼4.4%
  - Dwellings: 207
- Time zone: UTC−5 (EST)
  - Summer (DST): UTC−4 (EDT)
- Postal code(s): G0J 2M0
- Area codes: 418, 581
- Highways: R-132
- Website: www.sainte-florence.org

Sainte-Florence (French pronunciation: [sɛ̃t flɔʁɑ̃s];) is a Canadian forestry village in the province of Quebec, located in the Matapédia Valley on the Gaspé Peninsula.

The municipality had a population of 367 as of the 2021 Canadian census.

== History ==
Around 1897, the Parish of Sainte-Florence-de-Beaurivage was formed. In 1911, the Parish Municipality of Sainte-Florence-de-Beaurivage-Partie-Nord was founded.

In 1947, its name was shortened to Sainte-Florence and its status changed to regular municipality.

== Demographics ==
In the 2021 Census of Population conducted by Statistics Canada, Sainte-Florence had a population of 367 living in 187 of its 207 total private dwellings, a change of −4.4% from its 2016 population of 384. With a land area of 103.48 km^{2} (39.95 sq mi), it had a population density of 3.5/km^{2} (9.2/sq mi) in 2021.

=== Population ===
Canada census – Sainte-Florence community profile

	2021	2016	2011
Population	367 (-4.4% from 2016)	384 (-7.2% from 2011)	414 (-9.6% from 2006)
Land area	103.48 km^{2} (39.95 sq mi)	103.57 km^{2} (39.99 sq mi)	103.05 km^{2} (39.79 sq mi)
Population density	3.5/km^{2} (9.1/sq mi)	3.7/km^{2} (9.6/sq mi)	4.0/km^{2} (10/sq mi)
Median age	56.4 (M: 57.2, F: 55.6)	54.5 (M: 54.1, F: 55.5)	54.0 (M: 53.5, F: 54.2)
Private dwellings	207 (total) 187 (occupied)	209 (total)	215 (total)
Median household income	$46,800	$40,768	$.N/A

Notes: 2011 income data suppressed to meet the confidentiality requirements of the Statistics Act.
References: 2021 2016 2011

Historical census populations – Sainte-Florence, Quebec

Year	Pop.	±%
1911	365	—
1921	680	+86.3%
1931	795	+16.9%
1941	993	+24.9%
1951	1,111	+11.9%
1956	1,218	+9.6%
1961	1,064	−12.6%

Year	Pop.	±%
1966	857	−19.5%
1971	706	−17.6%
1976	650	−7.9%
1981	639	−1.7%
1986	607	−5.0%
1991	557	−8.2%
1996	546	−2.0%

Year	Pop.	±%
2001	473	−13.4%
2006	458	−3.2%
2011	414	−9.6%
2016	384	−7.2%
2021	367	−4.4%

Source: Statistics Canada

== Government ==
Municipal council:

- Mayor: Carol Poitras
- Councillors: Gérald Mazerolle, Nancy Girard, Patrick Roy, Gisèle Levesque, Claude Marineau, France Lepage

== See also ==
- List of municipalities in Quebec
