= Padoue, Quebec =

Padoue
- Municipality
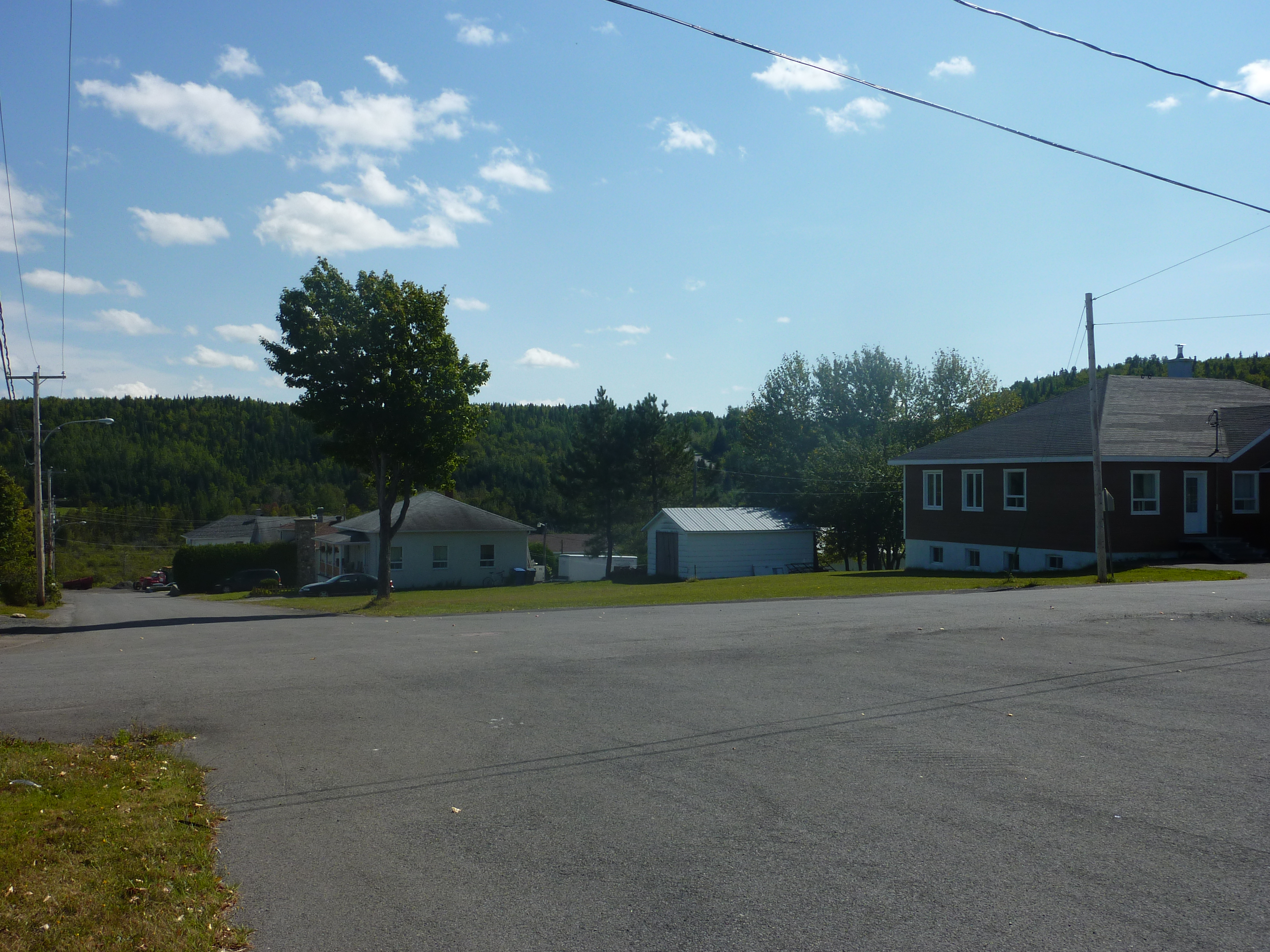

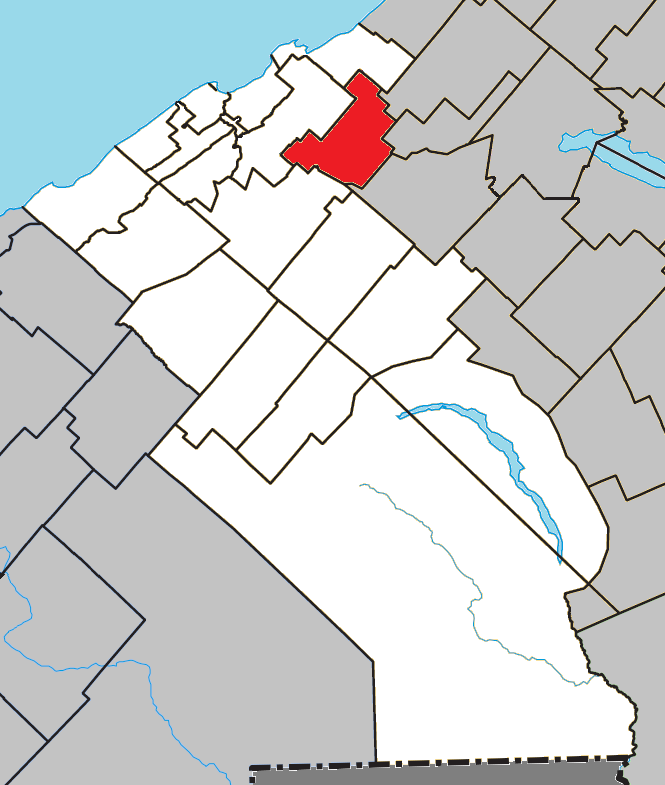
- Location within La Mitis RCM

- Location in eastern Quebec
- Coordinates: 48.58°N 67.98°W
- Country: Canada
- Province: Quebec
- Region: Bas-Saint-Laurent
- RCM: La Mitis
- Constituted: January 31, 1911

Government
  - Mayor: Patrick Gaudreault
  - Federal riding: Rimouski-Neigette—Mitis—Matapédia—Les Basques
  - Prov. riding: Matane-Matapédia-Mitis

Area
  - Total: 67.40 km^{2} (26.02 sq mi)
  - Land: 66.66 km^{2} (25.74 sq mi)

Population (2021)
  - Total: 250
  - Density: 3.8/km^{2} (9.8/sq mi)
  - Pop 2016-2021: ▲2%
  - Dwellings: 123
- Time zone: UTC−5 (EST)
  - Summer (DST): UTC−4 (EDT)
- Postal code(s): G0J 1X0
- Area codes: 418 and 581
- Highways: No major routes
- Website: www.municipalite. padoue.qc.ca

Padoue (French pronunciation: [padu]) is a municipality in Quebec, Canada.

== Demographics ==
In the 2021 Census, Statistics Canada reported that Padoue had a population of 250 living in 111 of its 123 total dwellings, a 2% change from its 2016 population of 245.

== See also ==
- List of municipalities in Quebec
