= Albertville, Quebec =

Albertville
- Municipality
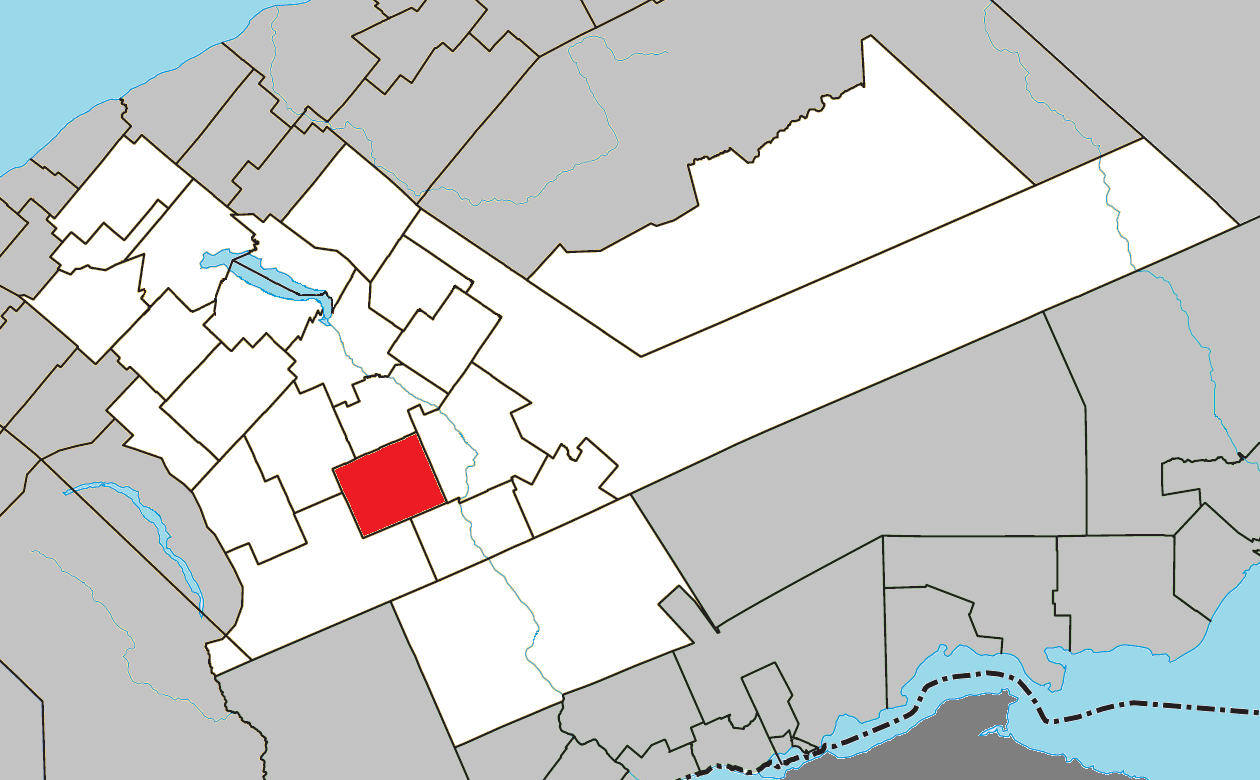
- Location within La Matapédia RCM

- Location in eastern Quebec
- Coordinates: 48°19′N 67°22′W
- Country: Canada
- Province: Quebec
- Region: Bas-Saint-Laurent
- RCM: La Matapédia
- Settled: 1899
- Constituted: November 29, 1930

Government
  - Mayor: Martin Landry
  - Fed. riding: Rimouski-Neigette—Mitis—Matapédia—Les Basques
  - Prov. riding: Matane-Matapédia-Mitis

Area
  - Total: 104.71 km^{2} (40.43 sq mi)
  - Land: 103.13 km^{2} (39.82 sq mi)

Population (2021)
  - Total: 239
  - Density: 2.3/km^{2} (6.0/sq mi)
  - Change 2016–21: ▲5.8%
  - Dwellings: 163
- Time zone: UTC−5 (EST)
  - Summer (DST): UTC−4 (EDT)
- Postal code(s): G0J 1A0
- Area codes: 418 and 581
- Highways: No major routes
- Website: www.municipalite-albertville.ca

Albertville is a municipality in the Canadian province of Quebec, located in La Matapédia Regional County Municipality.

The municipality, named after André-Albert Blais, 2nd bishop of Rimouski, had a population of 239 in the 2021 Canadian census.

== History ==
Settlement began in 1899 when 3 families came to the area, but growth remained slow. In 1912, a mission was established which became a parish, called Saint-Raphaël-d'Albertville, in 1920. In 1930, the parish municipality was created, taking its name from the parish.

In 1997, the Parish Municipality of Saint-Raphaël-d'Albertville changed its name and statutes to become the Municipality of Albertville.

== Geography ==
Albertville is in one of the highest territories of the Matapédia Valley.

== Demographics ==
In the 2021 Census of Population conducted by Statistics Canada, Albertville had a population of 239 living in 122 of its 163 total private dwellings, a change of 5.8% from its 2016 population of 226. With a land area of 103.13 km^{2} (39.82 sq mi), it had a population density of 2.3/km^{2} (6.0/sq mi) in 2021.

Canada census – Albertville community profile

	2021	2016	2011
Population	239 (+5.8% from 2016)	226 (-11.7% from 2011)	256 (-19.7% from 2006)
Land area	103.13 km^{2} (39.82 sq mi)	103.24 km^{2} (39.86 sq mi)	102.27 km^{2} (39.49 sq mi)
Population density	2.3/km^{2} (6.0/sq mi)	2.2/km^{2} (5.7/sq mi)	2.5/km^{2} (6.5/sq mi)
Median age	56.8 (M: 58.8, F: 55.6)	53.0 (M: 54.3, F: 51.2)	48.0 (M: 47.3, F: 48.6)
Private dwellings	163 (total) 122 (occupied)	126 (total)	146 (total)
Median household income	$n/a	$41,408	$40,298

Notes: 2021 income data for this area has been suppressed for data quality or confidentiality reasons.
References: 2021 2016 2011

Historical census populations – Albertville, Quebec

Year	Pop.	±%
1921	858	—
1931	735	−14.3%
1941	1,107	+50.6%
1951	1,165	+5.2%
1956	1,098	−5.8%
1961	1,061	−3.4%

Year	Pop.	±%
1966	857	−19.2%
1971	615	−28.2%
1976	464	−24.6%
1981	455	−1.9%
1986	430	−5.5%
1991	400	−7.0%

Year	Pop.	±%
1996	364	−9.0%
2001	337	−7.4%
2006	319	−5.3%
2011	256	−19.7%
2016	226	−11.7%
2021	239	+5.8%

Source: Statistics Canada

== Government ==
Municipal council:

- Mayor: Martin Landry
- Councillors: Jennyfer Ruel, Géraldine Chrétien, Albert Robichaud, Denise Desmarais, Catherine Larochelle, Gilberte Potvin

List of former mayors:

- Polydor Brochu (1931–1933, 1937–1939)
- J. O. Martineau (1933–1935, 1943–1947)
- J. W. Potvin (1935–1937)
- Marcel Chabot (1939–1941)
- Alfred Desmeules (1941–1943, 1949–1959)
- Edgar Tardif (1947–1949)
- Ephrem Thériault (1959–1962)
- Paul Desmeules (1962–1975)
- Fernando Thériault (1975–1981)
- Conrad Chabot (1981–1989)
- Gratien Thériault (1989–1991, 1993–2005)
- Pauline Desmarais (1991–1993)
- Martin Landry (2005–present)

== Education ==
Albertville is covered by the Monts-et-Marées Scholar Service Centre with the Saint-Rosaire School in Causapscal offering elementary education and the Forimont Polyvalente in Causapscal offering High School education.

== See also ==
- List of municipalities in Quebec
