= Saint-Tharcisius =

- Parish municipality
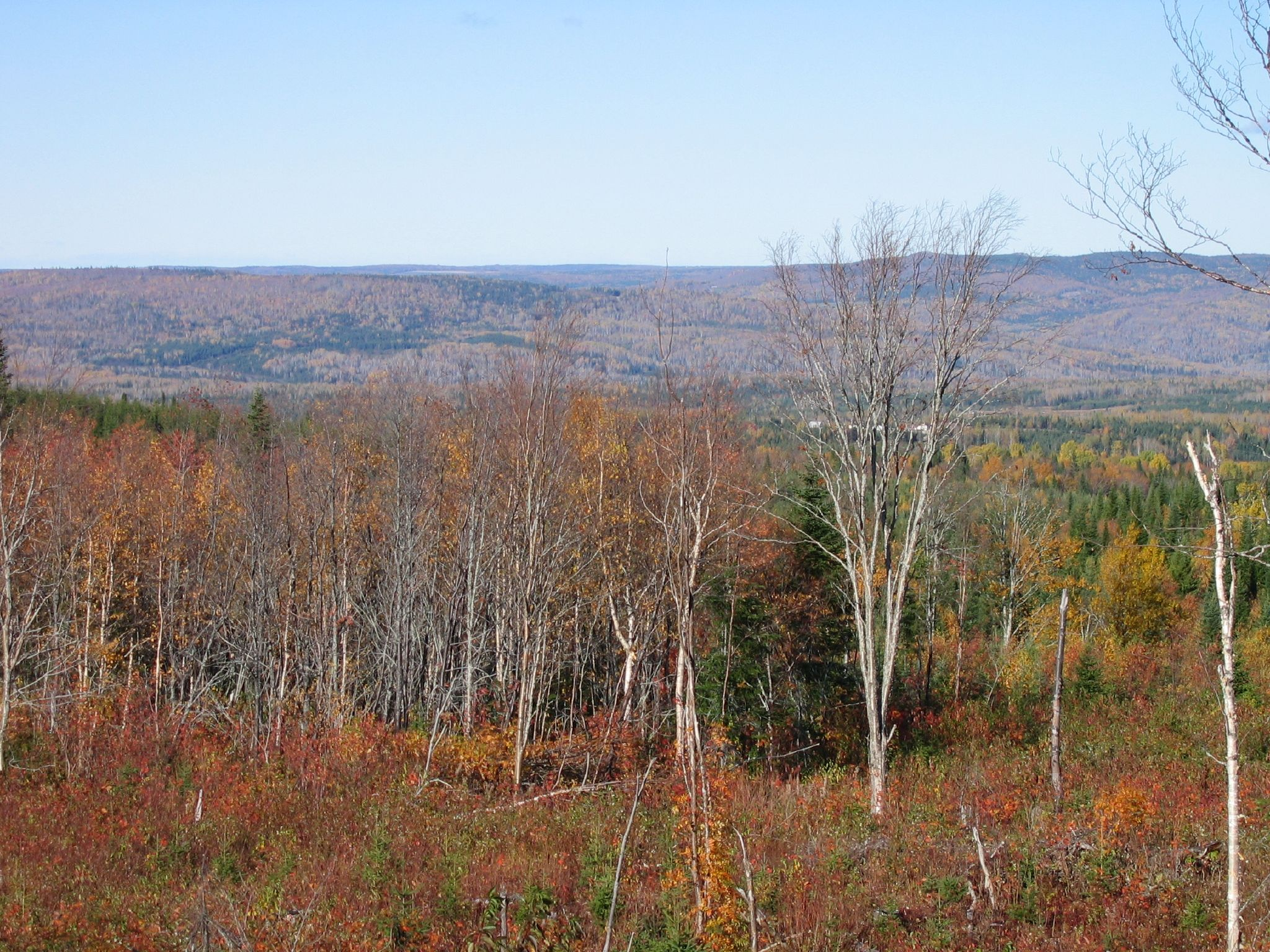

- Coat of arms
- Motto: Foi, Fraternité, Travail
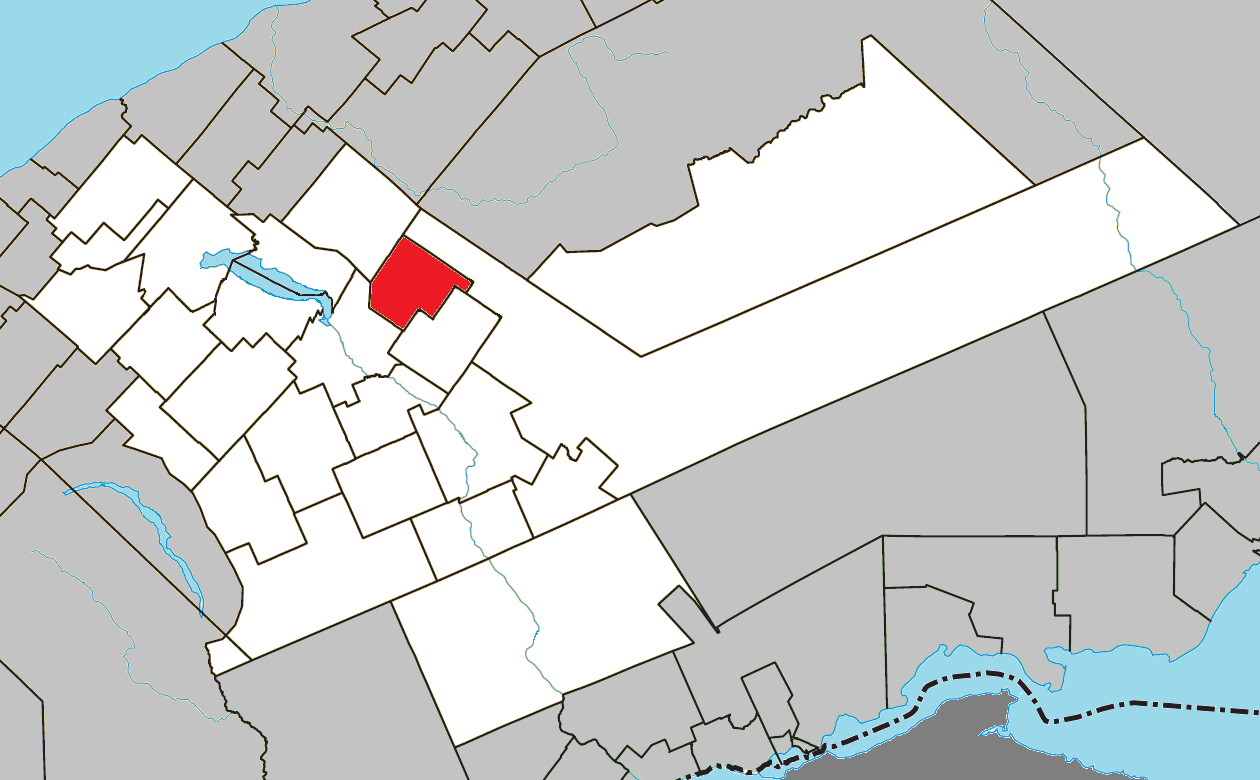
- Location within La Matapédia RCM

- Location in eastern Quebec
- Coordinates: 48°32′47″N 67°20′26″W
- Country: Canada
- Province: Quebec
- Region: Bas-Saint-Laurent
- RCM: La Matapédia
- Settled: 1912
- Constituted: December 4, 1937

Government
  - Mayor: Sophie Lapointe
  - Fed. riding: Rimouski-Neigette—Mitis—Matapédia—Les Basques
  - Prov. riding: Matane-Matapédia-Mitis

Area
  - Total: 79.35 km^{2} (30.64 sq mi)
  - Land: 78.84 km^{2} (30.44 sq mi)

Population (2021)
  - Total: 411
  - Density: 5.2/km^{2} (13/sq mi)
  - Change 2016-21: ▼2.4%
  - Dwellings: 199
- Time zone: UTC−05:00 (EST)
  - Summer (DST): UTC−04:00 (EDT)
- Postal code(s): G0J 3G0
- Area codes: 418, 581
- Highways: R-195
- Website: saint-tharcisius.ca

Saint-Tharcisius is a parish municipality in Quebec, Canada.

The village was named after Roman martyr Tarcisius who preferred to be killed rather than desecrate the Eucharist in the 3rd century.

== History ==
Saint-Tharcisius was created in 1937 from merging a section of Saint-Benoît-Joseph-Labre with territories hitherto devoid of municipal organisation. In 1965, a section of Saint-Tharcisius was taken for the creation of Saint-Alexandre-des-Lacs.

== Demographics ==
In the 2021 Census of Population conducted by Statistics Canada, Saint-Tharcisius had a population of 411 living in 185 of its 199 total private dwellings, a change of −2.4% from its 2016 population of 421. With a land area of 78.84 km^{2} (30.44 sq mi), it had a population density of 5.2/km^{2} (13.5/sq mi) in 2021.

Canada census – Saint-Tharcisius community profile

	2021	2016	2011
Population	411 (-2.4% from 2016)	421 (-9.3% from 2011)	464 (-3.3% from 2006)
Land area	78.84 km^{2} (30.44 sq mi)	79.11 km^{2} (30.54 sq mi)	80.01 km^{2} (30.89 sq mi)
Population density	5.2/km^{2} (13/sq mi)	5.3/km^{2} (14/sq mi)	5.8/km^{2} (15/sq mi)
Median age	52.8 (M: 51.2, F: 54.0)	47.4 (M: 47.2, F: 47.6)	44.7 (M: 43.2, F: 46.1)
Private dwellings	199 (total) 185 (occupied)	202 (total) 187 (occupied)	206 (total)
Median household income	$51,600	$40,832	$32,830

Notes: 2016 data based on Population and dwelling count amendment
References: 2021 2016 2011

Historical census populations – Saint-Tharcisius

Year	Pop.	±%
1941	1,131	—
1951	1,220	+7.9%
1956	1,307	+7.1%
1961	1,285	−1.7%
1966	999	−22.3%
1971	892	−10.7%
1976	748	−16.1%
1981	706	−5.6%

Year	Pop.	±%
1986	636	−9.9%
1991	571	−10.2%
1996	557	−2.5%
2001	503	−9.7%
2006	480	−4.6%
2011	464	−3.3%
2016	421	−9.3%
2021	411	−2.4%

2016 Population amount based on revised count.
Source: Statistics Canada

Mother tongue (2021):

- English as first language: 0%
- French as first language: 100%
- English and French as first languages: 0%
- Other as first language: 1.2%

== Government ==
Municipal council (as of 2024):

- Mayor: Renaud Arguin
- Councillors: Sophie Lapointe, Sylvie Simoneau, Michel Gagné, Micheline Jean, Donald Clément, Annie Jalbert

== Education ==
A French-language elementary school, École Saint-Tharcisius, is operated by the Centre de services scolaire des Monts-et-Marées.

== See also ==
- List of parish municipalities in Quebec
