= La Matapédia Regional County Municipality =

La Matapédia
- Regional county municipality
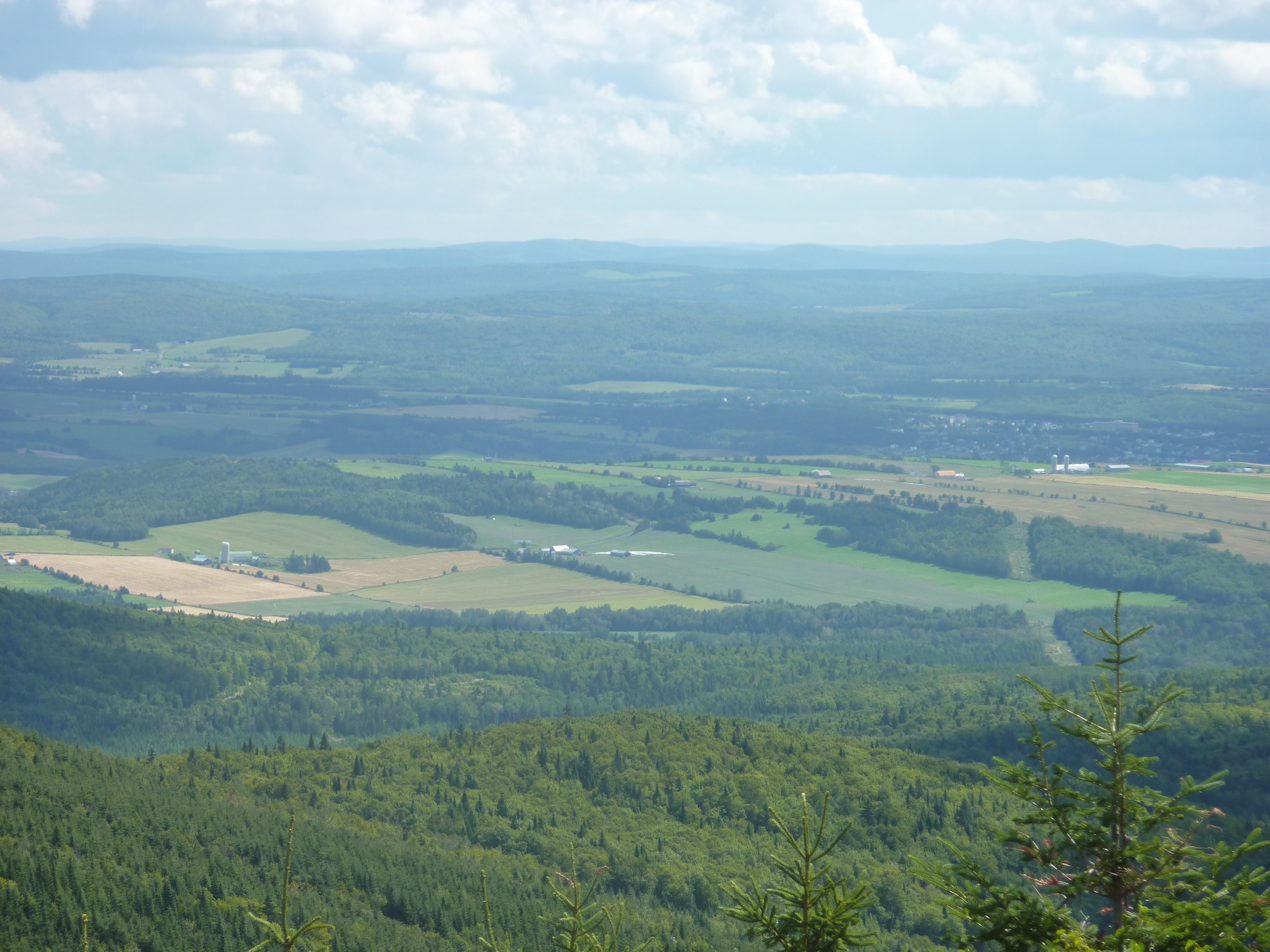

- Coordinates: 48°18′N 67°34′W
- Country: Canada
- Province: Quebec
- Region: Bas-Saint-Laurent
- Effective: January 1, 1982
- County seat: Amqui

Government
  - Type: Prefecture
  - Prefect: Chantale Lavoie
  - Federal riding: Rimouski—La Matapédia
  - Prov. riding: Matane-Matapédia
  - MP: Maxime Blanchette-Joncas (BQ)
  - MNA: Pascal Bérubé (PQ)

Area
  - Total: 5,389.00 km^{2} (2,080.70 sq mi)
  - Land: 5,374.57 km^{2} (2,075.13 sq mi)

Population (2021)
  - Total: 17,592
  - Density: 3.3/km^{2} (8.5/sq mi)
  - Change 2016-2021: ▼1.9%
  - Dwellings: 9,274
- Time zone: UTC−5 (EST)
  - Summer (DST): UTC−4 (EDT)
- Area codes: 418 and 581
- Website: www.mrcmatapedia.qc.ca

La Matapédia (French pronunciation: [la matapedja]) is a regional county municipality (RCM) in eastern Quebec, Canada at the base of the Gaspé peninsula, in the Bas-Saint-Laurent region. Its seat is in Amqui. It is named after the Matapédia River which runs through the western part of the RCM.

La Matapédia was created on January 1, 1982, succeeding from the former Matapédia County Municipality. The region was subject to one of the last waves of colonization in Quebec, settled mostly by people from the Lower Saint-Lawrence between 1850 and 1950. It is a rural region in the Matapedia Valley crossed by the Notre Dame Mountains. Agriculture and logging, and its related industries (forestry and wood products), are the main economic activities.

== Subdivisions ==
There are 25 subdivisions within the RCM:

Cities & Towns (2)

- Amqui
- Causapscal

Municipalities (7)

- Albertville
- Lac-au-Saumon
- Sainte-Florence
- Sainte-Marguerite-Marie
- Saint-Vianney
- Sayabec
- Val-Brillant

Parishes (8)

- Saint-Alexandre-des-Lacs
- Saint-Cléophas
- Saint-Damase
- Sainte-Irène
- Saint-Léon-le-Grand
- Saint-Moïse
- Saint-Tharcisius
- Saint-Zénon-du-Lac-Humqui

Villages (1)

- Saint-Noël

Unorganized Territory (7)

- Lac-Alfred
- Lac-Casault
- Lac-Matapédia
- Rivière-Patapédia-Est
- Rivière-Vaseuse
- Routhierville
- Ruisseau-des-Mineurs

== Demographics ==
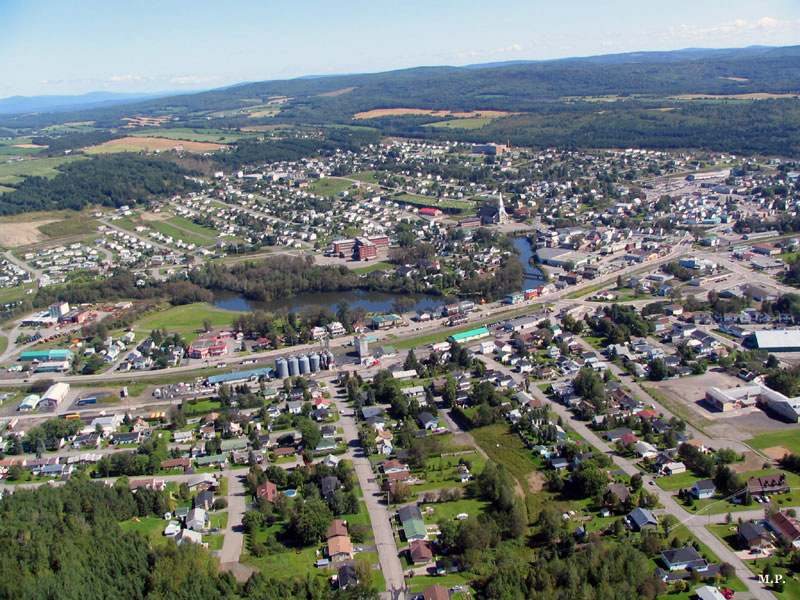
Amqui

=== Population ===
Canada census – La Matapédia community profile

	2021	2016	2011
Population	17,592 (-1.9% from 2016)	17,925 (-3.5% from 2011)	18,573 (-3.3% from 2006)
Land area	5,354.53 km^{2} (2,067.40 sq mi)	5,374.57 km^{2} (2,075.13 sq mi)	5,373.92 km^{2} (2,074.88 sq mi)
Population density	3.3/km^{2} (8.5/sq mi)	3.3/km^{2} (8.5/sq mi)	3.5/km^{2} (9.1/sq mi)
Median age	52.4 (M: 52.0, F: 52.8)	50.6 (M: 50.1, F: 51.2)	48.0 (M: 47.7, F: 48.2)
Private dwellings	9,274 (total) 8,258 (occupied)	9,142 (total)	9,116 (total)
Median household income	$56,800	$47,488	$42,628

References: 2021 2016 2011

Historical Census Data - La Matapédia Regional County Municipality, Quebec

Year	Pop.	±%
1991	20,887	—
1996	20,883	−0.0%
2001	19,920	−4.6%

Year	Pop.	±%
2006	19,199	−3.6%
2011	18,573	−3.3%
2016	17,925	−3.5%

=== Language ===
Canada Census Mother Tongue - La Matapédia Regional County Municipality, Quebec
Census	Total	French			English			French & English			Other		
Year	Responses	Count	Trend	Pop %	Count	Trend	Pop %	Count	Trend	Pop %	Count	Trend	Pop %
2016	17,790	17,635	▼3.2%	99.13%	70	▼6.7%	0.39%	35	▲16.7%	0.20%	50	▲100.0%	0.28%
2011	18,345	18,215	▼2.4%	99.29%	75	▲36.4%	0.41%	30	▲200.0%	0.16%	25	▼68.8%	0.14%
2006	18,810	18,665	▼3.4%	99.23%	55	▲57.1%	0.29%	10	▼75.0%	0.05%	80	▲700.0%	0.43%
2001	19,405	19,320	▼4.7%	99.56%	35	▼41.7%	0.18%	40	▼42.9%	0.21%	10	▼60.0%	0.05%
1996	20,435	20,280	n/a	99.24%	60	n/a	0.29%	70	n/a	0.34%	25	n/a	0.12%

== Transportation ==
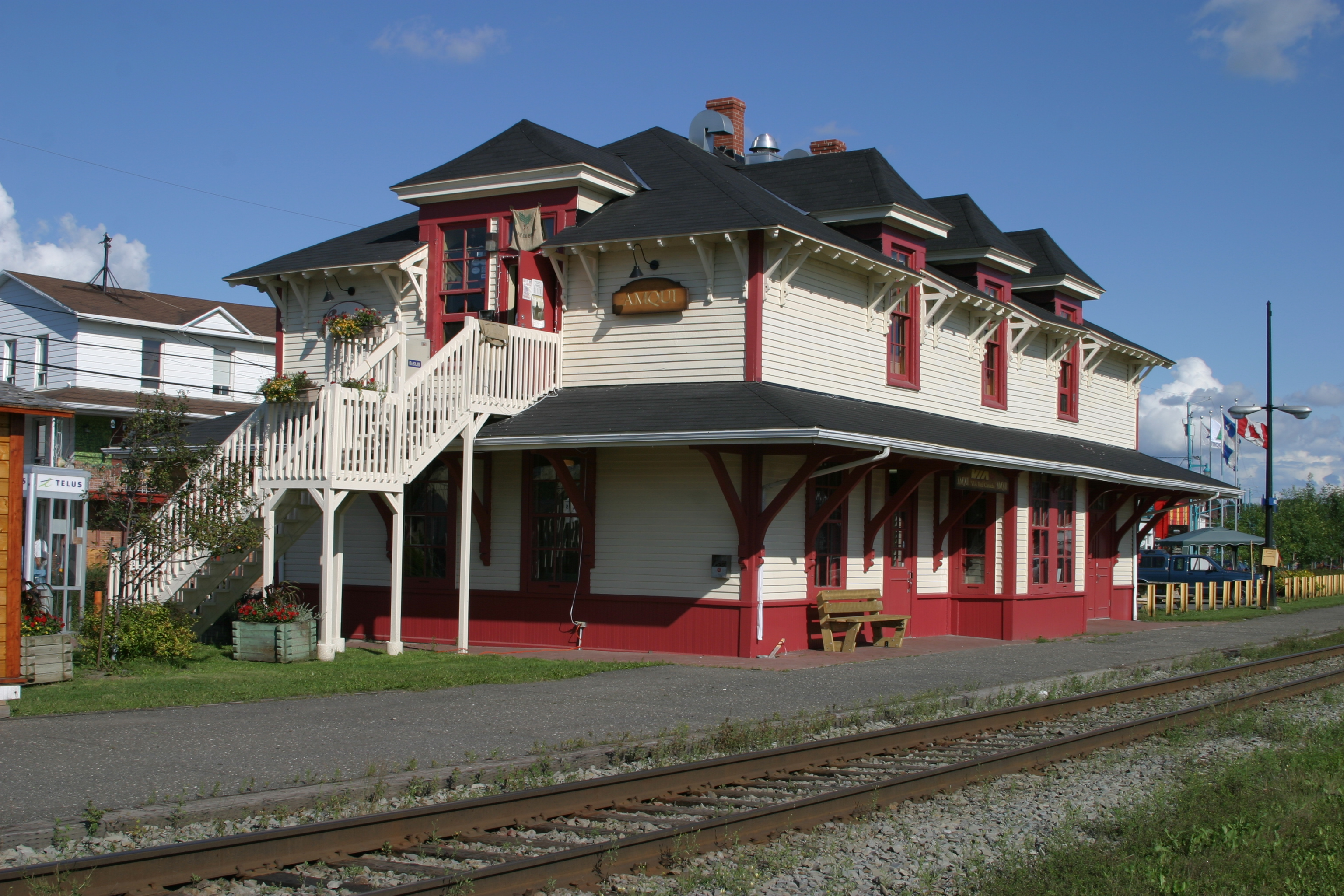
Amqui station

=== Access routes ===
Highways and numbered routes that run through the municipality, including external routes that start or finish at the county border:

- Autoroutes
  - None
- Principal Highways
  - R-132
  - R-195
- Secondary Highways
  - R-299
- External Routes
  - None

== See also ==
- List of regional county municipalities and equivalent territories in Quebec
