= Saint-Damase, Bas-Saint-Laurent =

Saint-Damase
- Parish municipality
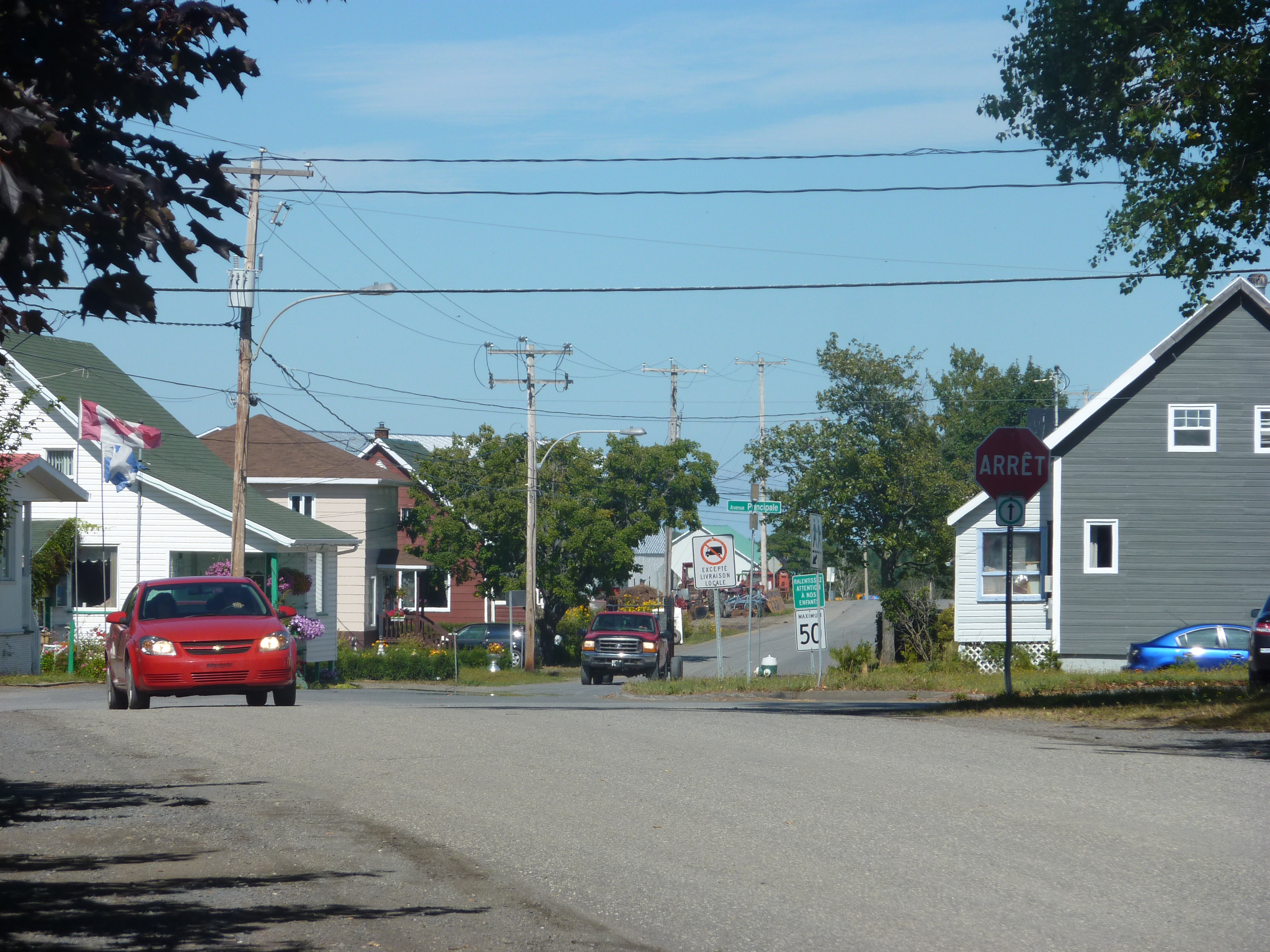

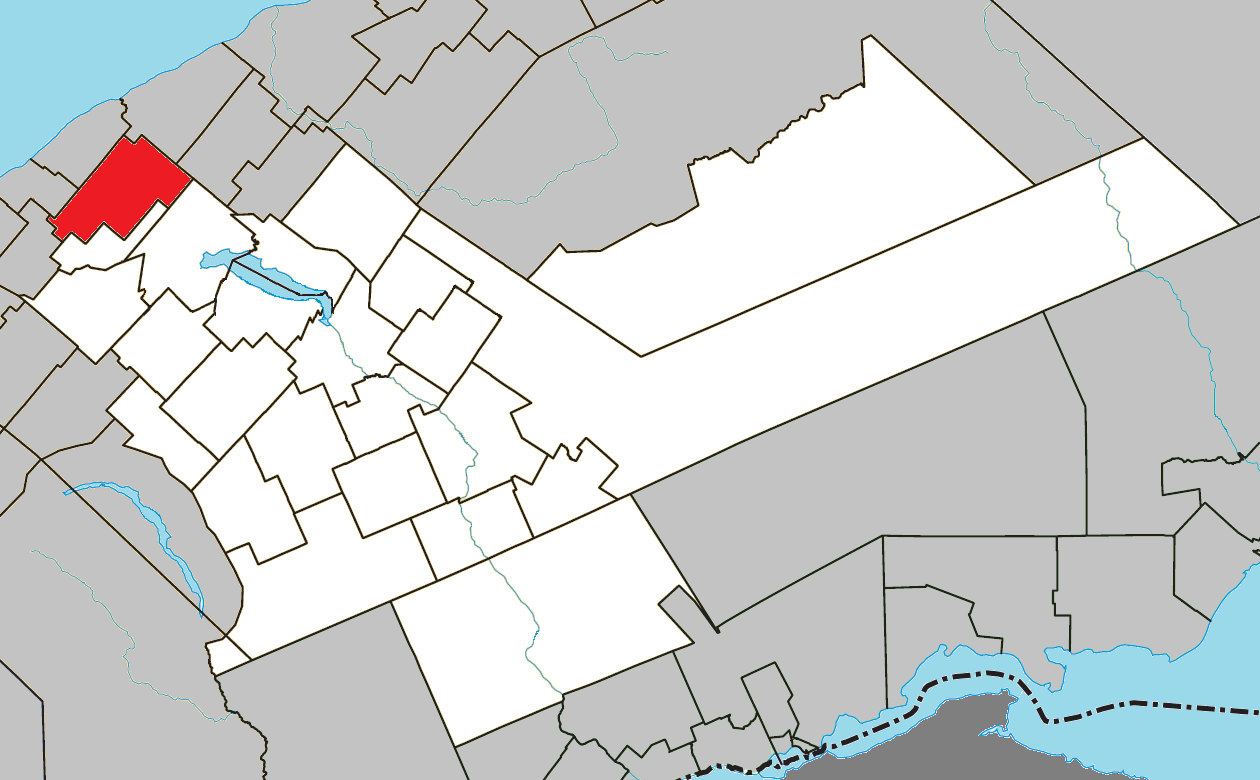
- Location within La Matapédia RCM

- Location in eastern Quebec
- Coordinates: 48°40′N 67°50′W
- Country: Canada
- Province: Quebec
- Region: Bas-Saint-Laurent
- RCM: La Matapédia
- Settled: 1868
- Constituted: December 31, 1885

Government
  - Mayor: Martin Carrier
  - Fed. riding: Rimouski-Neigette—Mitis—Matapédia—Les Basques
  - Prov. riding: Matane-Matapédia-Mitis

Area
  - Total: 119.63 km^{2} (46.19 sq mi)
  - Land: 116.42 km^{2} (44.95 sq mi)

Population (2021)
  - Total: 382
  - Density: 3.3/km^{2} (8.5/sq mi)
  - Change 2016-21: ▲7.3%
  - Dwellings: 178
- Time zone: UTC−5 (EST)
  - Summer (DST): UTC−4 (EDT)
- Postal code(s): G0J 2J0
- Area codes: 418, 581
- Highways: R-297
- Website: saint-damase.com

Saint-Damase (French pronunciation: [sɛ̃ damaz]) is a parish municipality in Quebec, Canada.

== Demographics ==
In the 2021 Census of Population conducted by Statistics Canada, Saint-Damase had a population of 382 living in 165 of its 178 total private dwellings, a change of 7.3% from its 2016 population of 356. With a land area of 116.42 km^{2} (44.95 sq mi), it had a population density of 3.3/km^{2} (8.5/sq mi) in 2021.

Canada census – Saint-Damase community profile

	2021	2016	2011
Population	382 (+7.3% from 2016)	426 (+7.3% from 2011)	397 (-11.0% from 2006)
Land area	116.42 km^{2} (44.95 sq mi)	116.69 km^{2} (45.05 sq mi)	117.02 km^{2} (45.18 sq mi)
Population density	3.3/km^{2} (8.5/sq mi)	3.7/km^{2} (9.6/sq mi)	3.4/km^{2} (8.8/sq mi)
Median age	46.4 (M: 49.6, F: 42.8)	49.8 (M: 52.1, F: 47.3)	45.9 (M: 47.2, F: 45.5)
Private dwellings	178 (total) 165 (occupied)	210 (total)	177 (total)
Median household income	$55,600	$56,960	$40,898

References: 2021 2016 2011

Historical census populations – Saint-Damase, Bas-Saint-Laurent

Year	Pop.	±%
1891	863	—
1901	896	+3.8%
1911	1,019	+13.7%
1921	1,190	+16.8%
1931	1,124	−5.5%
1941	1,215	+8.1%
1951	1,127	−7.2%

Year	Pop.	±%
1956	991	−12.1%
1961	894	−9.8%
1966	766	−14.3%
1971	624	−18.5%
1976	525	−15.9%
1981	489	−6.9%
1986	445	−9.0%

Year	Pop.	±%
1991	435	−2.2%
1996	439	+0.9%
2001	449	+2.3%
2006	446	−0.7%
2011	397	−11.0%
2016	356	−10.3%
2021	382	+7.3%

Source: Statistics Canada

Mother tongue (2021):

- English as first language: 0%
- French as first language: 98.7%
- English and French as first language: 0%
- Other as first language: 0%

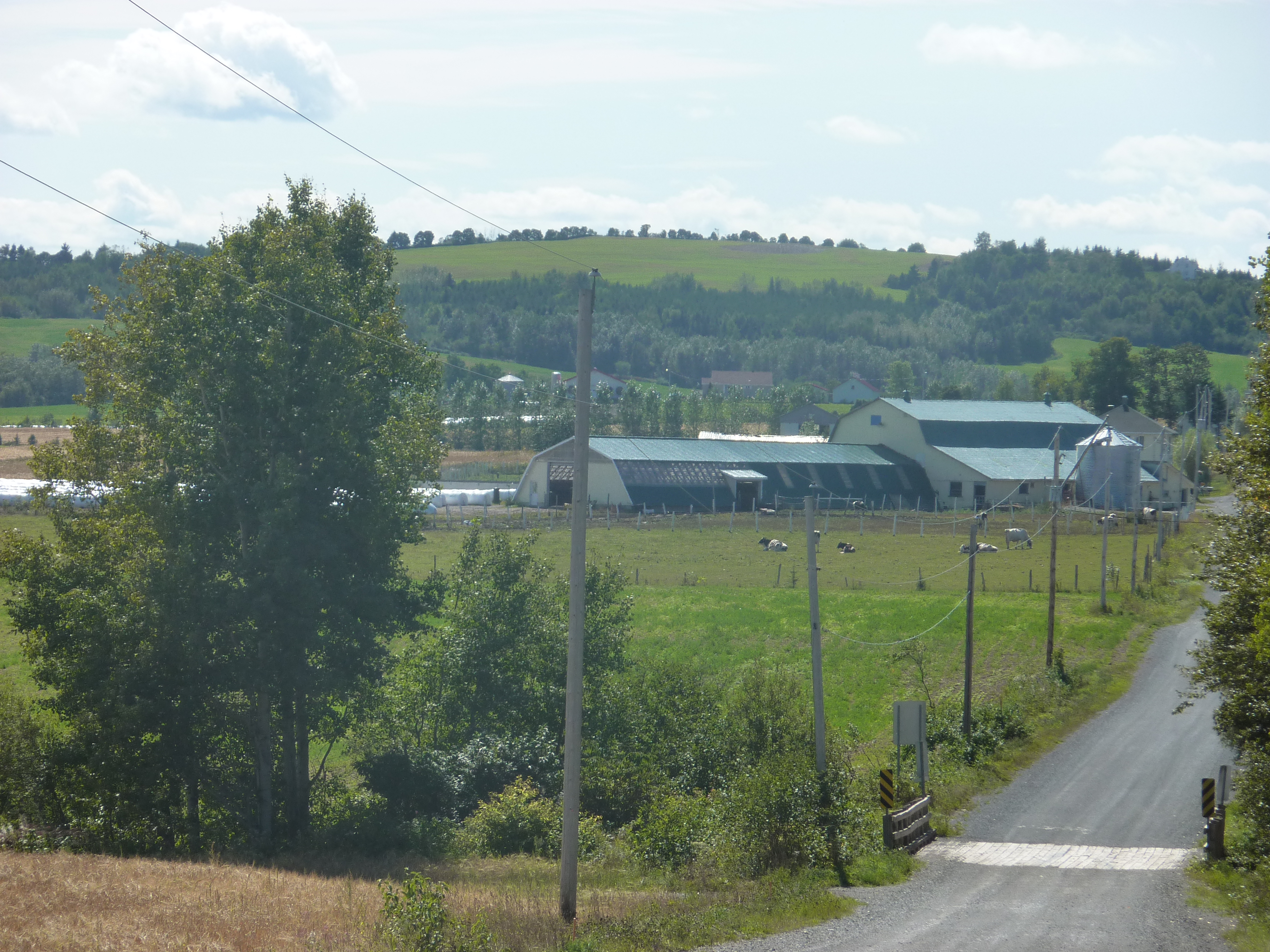
Countryside in Saint-Damase

== Government ==
=== Municipal council ===
Municipal council (2026):

- Mayor: Martin Carrier
- Councillors: Nelson Lavoie, Josée Maheux, Clermont Miousse, Hélène Ouellet, Isabelle Deschênes, Martine Côté

=== Political representation ===
Saint-Damase federal election results
Year	Liberal		Conservative		Bloc Québécois		New Democratic		Green	
2021	24%	62	10%	25	60%	155	2%	5	0%	0
2019	34%	84	10%	24	52%	130	2%	5	2%	4

Saint-Damase provincial election results
Year	CAQ		Liberal		QC solidaire		Parti Québécois	
2018	9%	22	15%	37	2%	6	74%	187
2014	7%	17	28%	64	4%	10	59%	134

== See also ==
- List of parish municipalities in Quebec
