= Sainte-Marguerite-Marie =

- Municipality
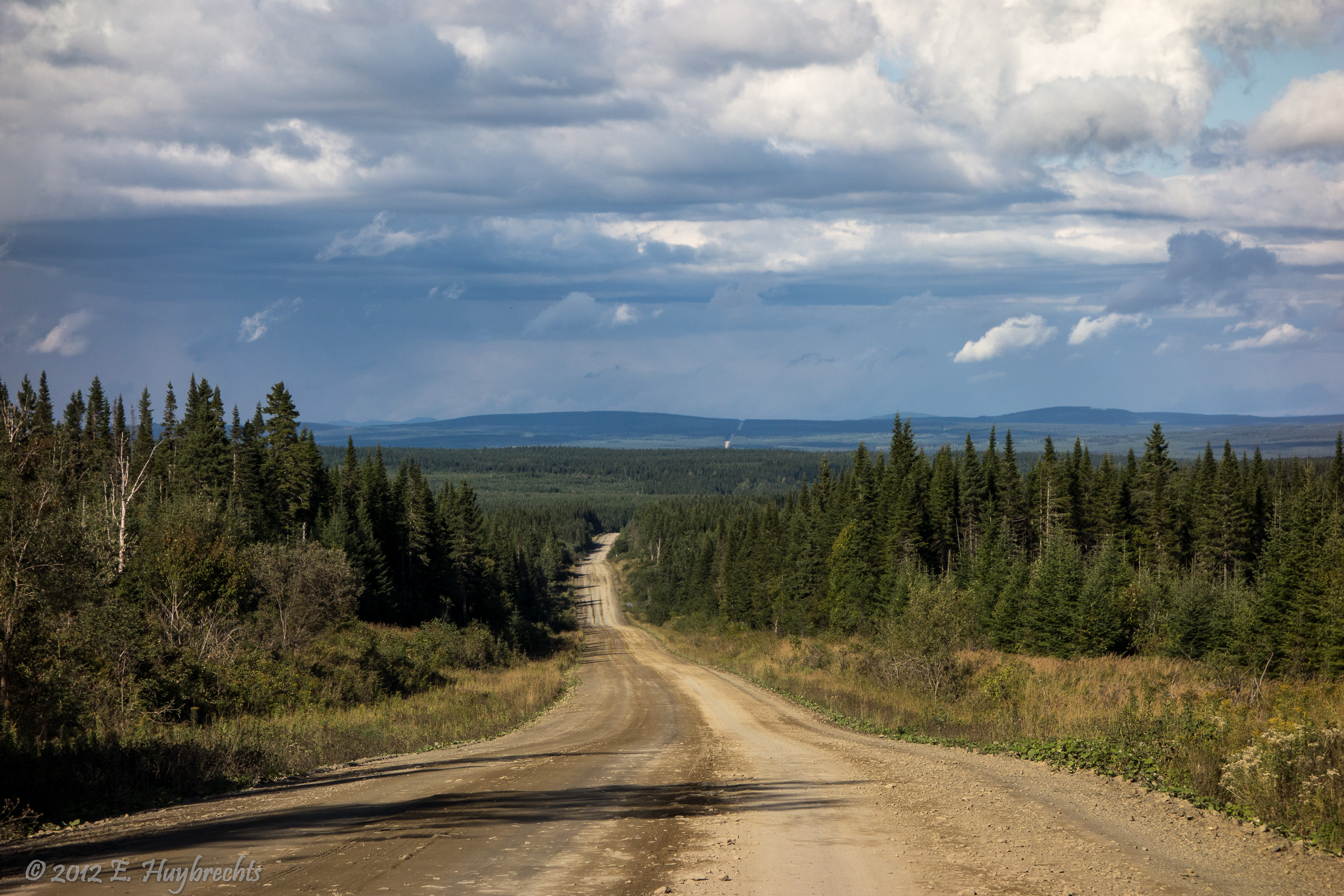

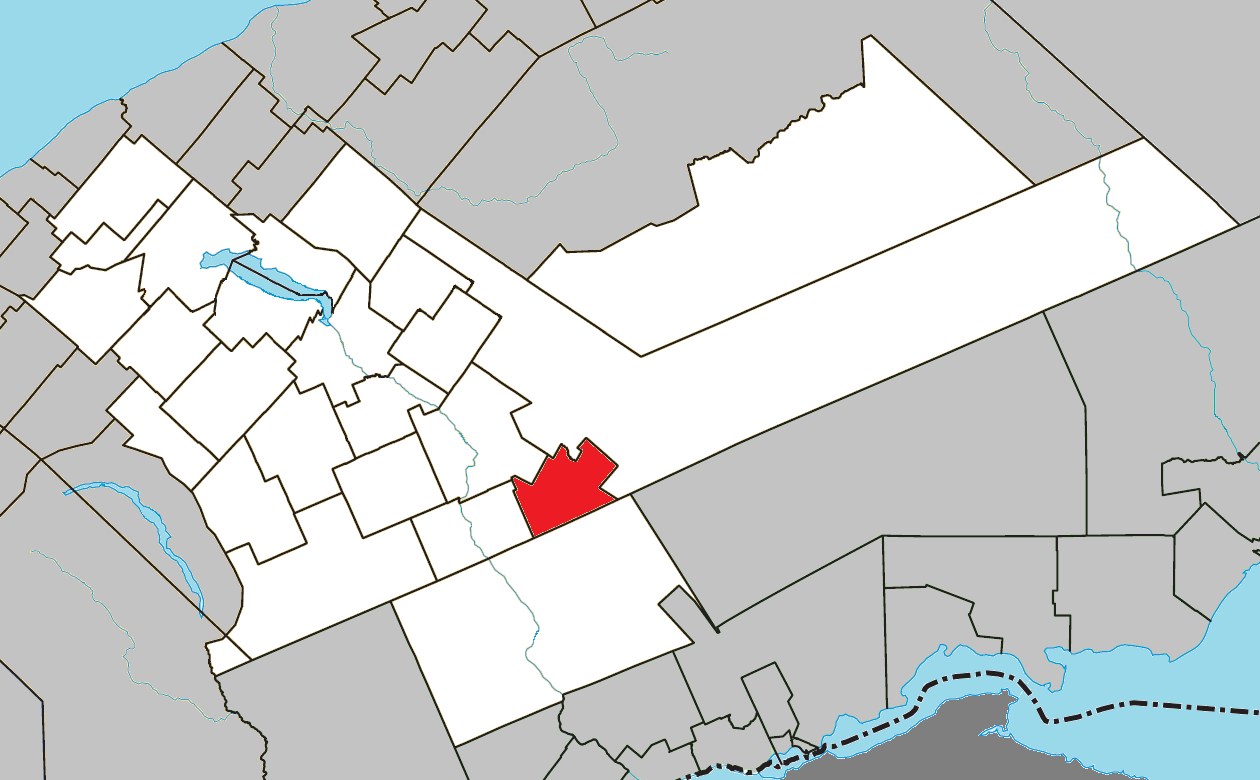
- Location within La Matapédia RCM

- Location in eastern Quebec
- Coordinates: 48°19′N 67°05′W
- Country: Canada
- Province: Quebec
- Region: Bas-Saint-Laurent
- RCM: La Matapédia
- Settled: 1915
- Constituted: January 1, 1957

Government
  - Mayor: Marlène Landry
  - Fed. riding: Rimouski-Neigette—Mitis—Matapédia—Les Basques
  - Prov. riding: Matane-Matapédia-Mitis

Area
  - Total: 86.66 km^{2} (33.46 sq mi)
  - Land: 85.97 km^{2} (33.19 sq mi)

Population (2021)
  - Total: 183
  - Density: 2.1/km^{2} (5.4/sq mi)
  - Change 2016-21: ▲10.2%
  - Dwellings: 91
- Time zone: UTC−5 (EST)
  - Summer (DST): UTC−4 (EDT)
- Postal code(s): G0J 2Y0
- Area codes: 418, 581
- Highways: No major routes
- Website: www.facebook.com/profile.php?id=100064404953334

Sainte-Marguerite-Marie (French pronunciation: [sɛ̃t maʁɡəʁit maʁi]) is a municipality in the Canadian province of Quebec, located in La Matapédia Regional County Municipality. It was known as Sainte-Marguerite until October 30, 2010.

The municipality had a population of 183 at the 2021 Canadian census.

== Demographics ==
Canada census – Sainte-Marguerite-Marie community profile

	2021	2016	2011
Population	183 (10.2% from 2016)	166 (-18.2% from 2011)	203 (-8.6% from 2006)
Land area	85.97 km^{2} (33.19 sq mi)	86.00 km^{2} (33.20 sq mi)	85.19 km^{2} (32.89 sq mi)
Population density	2.1/km^{2} (5.4/sq mi)	1.9/km^{2} (4.9/sq mi)	2.4/km^{2} (6.2/sq mi)
Median age	55.6 (M: 56.0, F: 55.2)	53.2 (M: 53.3, F: 53.0)	47.4 (M: 48.2, F: 47.0)
Private dwellings	91 (total) 86 (occupied)	91 (total)	93 (total)
Median household income	$n/a	$n/a	$n/a

Notes: Income data suppressed to meet the confidentiality requirements of the Statistics Act.
References: 2021 2016 2011

Historical census populations – Sainte-Marguerite-Marie

Year	Pop.	±%
1941	915	—
1951	1,004	+9.7%
1956	887	−11.7%
1961	794	−10.5%
1966	602	−24.2%
1971	546	−9.3%
1976	398	−27.1%
1981	360	−9.5%

Year	Pop.	±%
1986	307	−14.7%
1991	260	−15.3%
1996	235	−9.6%
2001	235	+0.0%
2006	222	−5.5%
2011	203	−8.6%
2016	166	−18.2%
2021	183	+10.2%

Source: Statistics Canada

== Government ==
Municipal council:

- Mayor: Marlène Landry
- Councillors: Jessy Thériault, Vicky Gauvin, Dany Thériault, Manon Godin, Jean-Claude Chouinard, Line Landry

=== Political representation ===
Federally, Sainte-Marguerite-Marie is part of the federal riding of Rimouski-Neigette—Mitis—Matapédia—Les Basques (named Rimouski—La Matapédia between 2025 to 2026). In the 2025 Canadian federal election, the incumbent Maxime Blanchette-Joncas of the Bloc Québécois was re-elected and began to represent the population Sainte-Marguerite-Marie in the House of Commons of Canada after the electoral district of Avignon—La Mitis—Matane—Matapédia was abolished.

Sainte-Marguerite-Marie federal election results
Year	Liberal		Conservative		Bloc Québécois		New Democratic		Green	
2021	19%	30	9%	14	64%	101	1%	2	0%	0
2019	29%	42	5%	7	65%	94	1%	2	0%	0
2015	38%	27	0%	0	35%	25	18%	13	3%	2
2011	14%	13	10%	9	47%	43	29%	27	0%	0
2008	26%	23	22%	19	46%	40	1%	1	3%	3
2006	12%	12	25%	26	56%	58	4%	4	2%	2
2004	27%	28	3%	3	66%	69	3%	3	1%	1

Provincially it is part of the riding of Matane-Matapédia-Mitis. In the 2026 Quebec general election the incumbent MNA Pascal Bérubé, of the Parti Québécois, was re-elected to represent the population of Sainte-Marguerite-Marie in the National Assembly of Quebec.

Sainte-Marguerite-Marie provincial election results
Year	CAQ		Liberal		QC solidaire		Parti Québécois	
2022	28%	27	3%	3	3%	3	55%	52
2018	13%	16	14%	17	4%	5	69%	86
2014	9%	11	25%	29	2%	3	60%	67
2012	13%	12	21%	19	4%	4	62%	56

== See also ==
- List of municipalities in Quebec
