= Sainte-Angèle-de-Mérici =

- Municipality
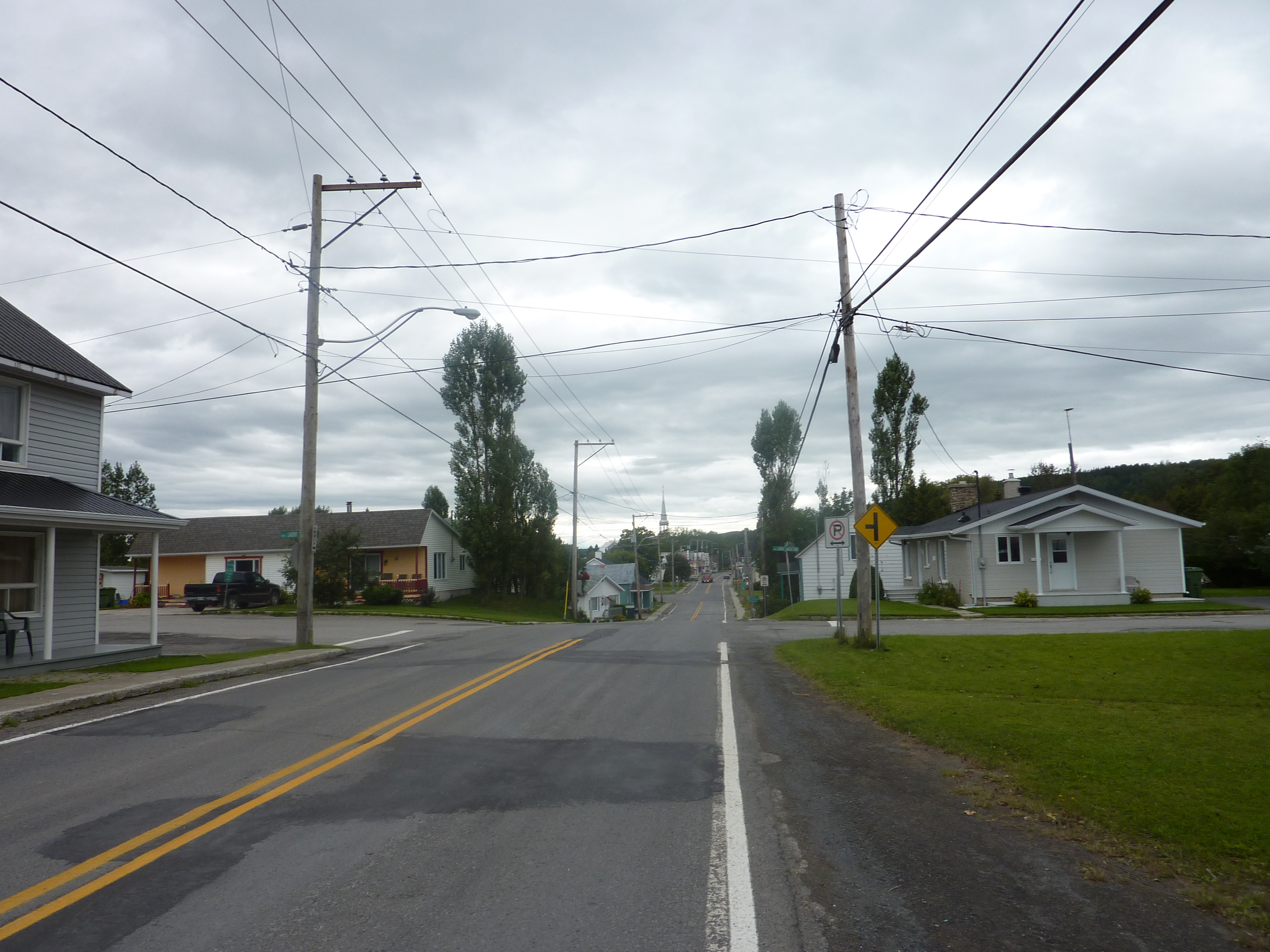
- Rue de la Vallée

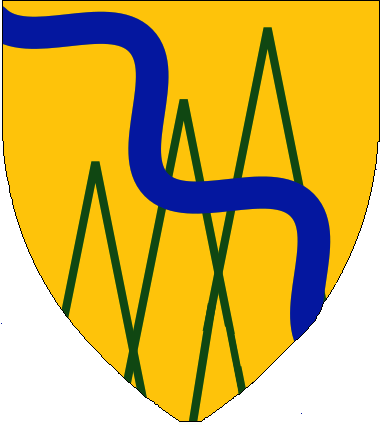
- Flag Coat of arms

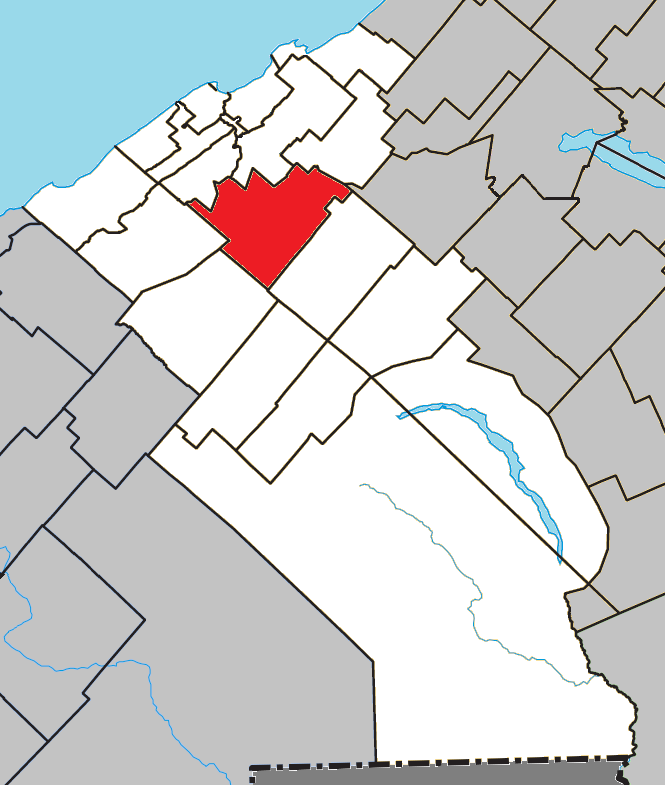
- Location within La Mitis RCM

- Location in eastern Quebec
- Coordinates: 48.525602°N 68.0851825°W
- Country: Canada
- Province: Quebec
- Region: Bas-Saint-Laurent
- RCM: La Mitis
- Constituted: April 26, 1989

Government
  - Mayor: Jimmy Valcourt
  - Federal riding: Rimouski-Neigette—Mitis—Matapédia—Les Basques
  - Prov. riding: Matane-Matapédia-Mitis

Area
  - Total: 107.30 km^{2} (41.43 sq mi)
  - Land: 107.78 km^{2} (41.61 sq mi)

Population (2021)
  - Total: 989
  - Density: 9.2/km^{2} (24/sq mi)
  - Pop 2016–2021: ▲3.8%
  - Dwellings: 519
- Time zone: UTC−5 (EST)
  - Summer (DST): UTC−4 (EDT)
- Postal code(s): G0J 2H0
- Area codes: 418 and 581
- Highways: R-132; R-234
- Website: www.municipalite.sainte -angele-de-merici.qc.ca

Sainte-Angèle-de-Mérici (French pronunciation: [sɛ̃t ɑ̃ʒɛl də meʁisi]) is a municipality in La Mitis Regional County Municipality in Quebec, Canada. It is part of the Bas-Saint-Laurent region and the population is 989 as of 2021

== See also ==
- List of municipalities in Quebec
