= La Rédemption, Quebec =

La Rédemption
- Parish municipality
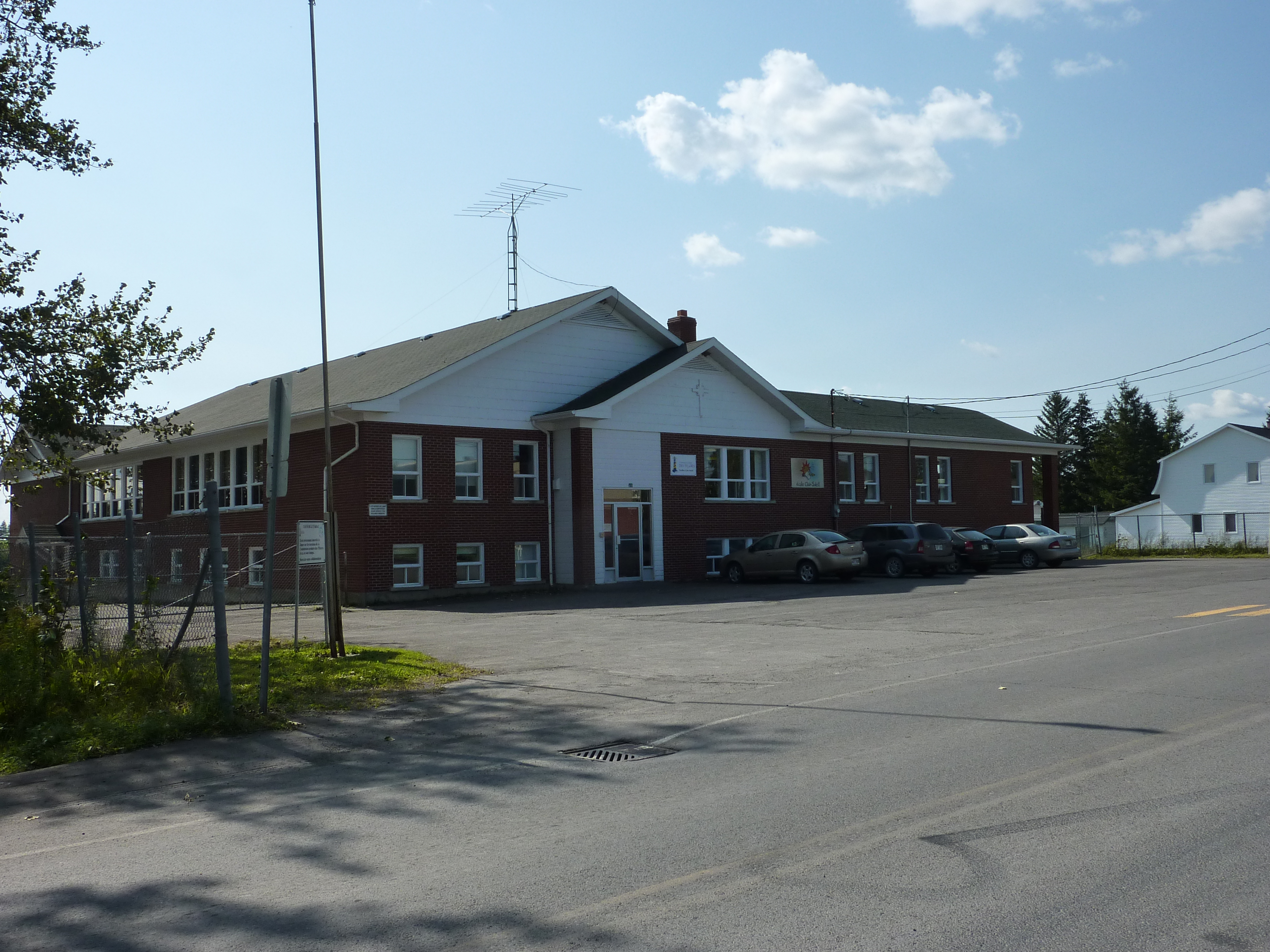

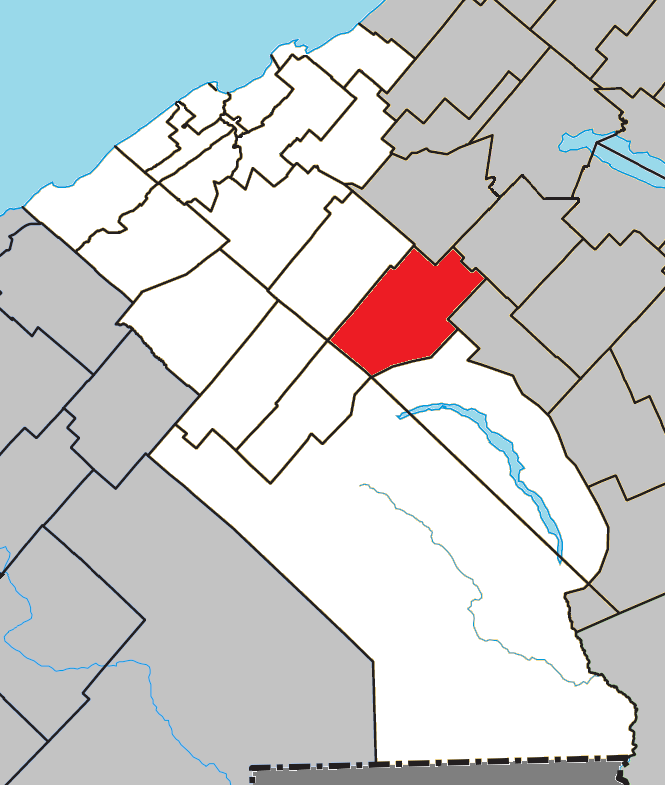
- Location within La Mitis RCM

- Location in eastern Quebec
- Coordinates: 48.45°N 67.88°W
- Country: Canada
- Province: Quebec
- Region: Bas-Saint-Laurent
- RCM: La Mitis
- Constituted: January 1, 1956

Government
  - Mayor: Simon-Yvan Caron
  - Federal riding: Rimouski-Neigette—Mitis—Matapédia—Les Basques
  - Prov. riding: Matane-Matapédia-Mitis

Area
  - Total: 117.50 km^{2} (45.37 sq mi)
  - Land: 116.63 km^{2} (45.03 sq mi)

Population (2021)
  - Total: 384
  - Density: 3.3/km^{2} (8.5/sq mi)
  - Pop 2016-2021: ▼11.1%
  - Dwellings: 227
- Time zone: UTC−5 (EST)
  - Summer (DST): UTC−4 (EDT)
- Postal code(s): G0J 1P0
- Area codes: 418 and 581
- Highways: No major routes
- Website: www.municipalite. laredemption.qc.ca

La Rédemption (French pronunciation: [la ʁedɑ̃psjɔ̃]) is a parish municipality located in the Bas-Saint-Laurent region of Quebec, Canada.

La Rédemption takes its toponym from redemption in the Christian faith. This refers to the fact that Jesus, through his sacrifice, redeemed humanity.

La Rédemption was founded in 1956.

== History ==
Before the founding of the municipality of La Rédemption, part of its bordering region was inhabited, a very long time ago, by a group of natives whose certain signs seem to indicate their presence near the current Chemin du Portage and of rang 8, at the mouth of the Rouge River on the Mitis River. The Rouge and Mitis rivers were a source of food and an important navigation route between the St. Lawrence and the Baie des Chaleurs. The various native clans had to portage through the falls and rapids to the lakes located upstream (now a single lake named Mitis) of the Mitis River and then down the Patapédia-Est then Patapédia rivers and, from there, choose other networks depending on your destination or continue on the Restigouche and the Matapédia to its mouth which is at the junction between New Brunswick and Quebec. The site of La Rédemption is therefore at the junction of the canoe navigation routes but also an exceptional site to spend the winter in safety.

More recently in the history of Quebec, mainly due to forestry activity, the foreseeable opening of a new parish was foreseeable. Thus, in the presence of more and more inhabitants in the territory, it was justified to open a new parish.

We found there the various usual infrastructures of the villages of Quebec including the post office which was opened in 1935. The credit union was founded on August 18, 1941. The Catholic parish was erected canonically in 1948. The parish municipality of La Rédemption was officially founded on January 1, 1956. But recent years have shown worrying signs of a significant decline in population and the closure of traditional institutions. These findings are observable in all rural villages in Quebec and La Rédemption is unfortunately no exception.

== Demographics ==
In the 2021 Census of Population conducted by Statistics Canada, La Rédemption had a population of 384 living in 174 of its 227 total private dwellings, a change of −11.1% from its 2016 population of 432. With a land area of 116.63 km^{2} (45.03 sq mi), it had a population density of 3.3/km^{2} (8.5/sq mi) in 2021.

== See also ==
- List of parish municipalities in Quebec
