= Rivière-Vaseuse =

- Unorganized territory
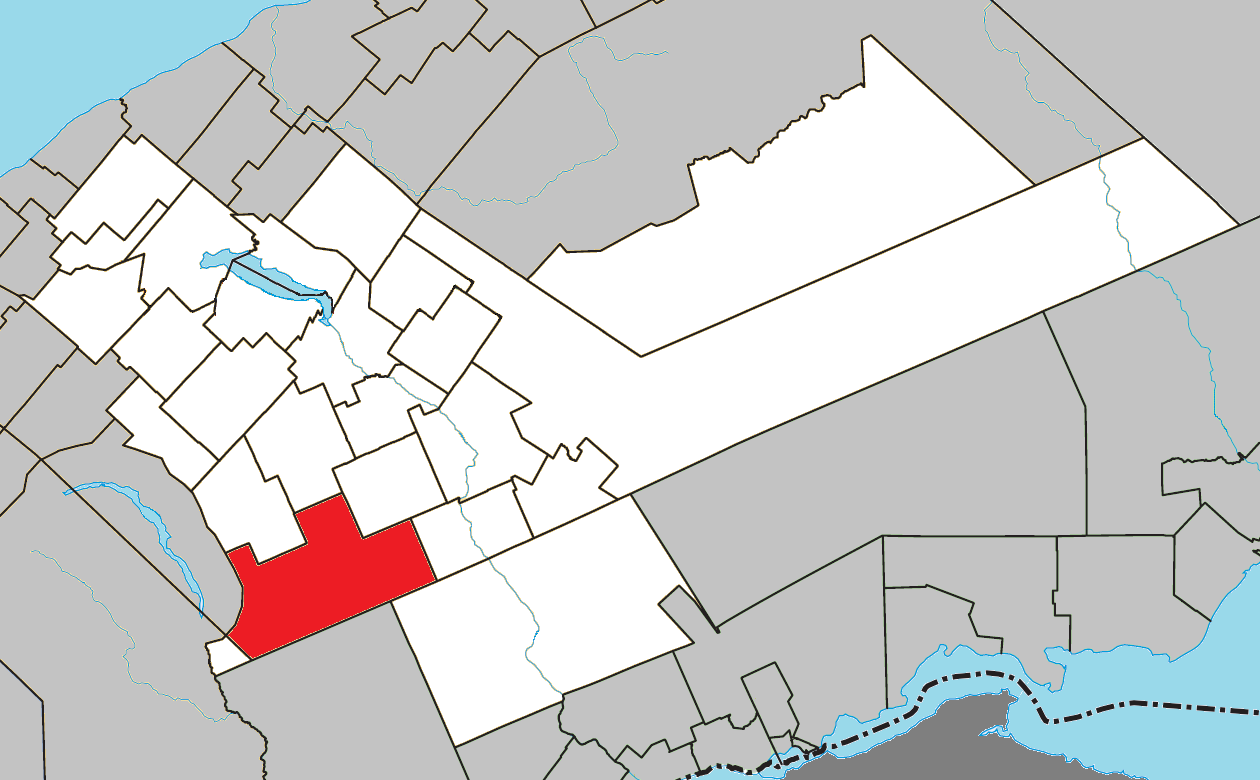
- Location within La Matapédia RCM

- Location in eastern Quebec
- Coordinates: 48°13′N 67°28′W
- Country: Canada
- Province: Quebec
- Region: Bas-Saint-Laurent
- RCM: La Matapédia
- Constituted: January 1, 1986

Government
  - Fed. riding: Rimouski-Neigette—Mitis—Matapédia—Les Basques
  - Prov. riding: Matane-Matapédia-Mitis

Area
  - Total: 276.29 km^{2} (106.68 sq mi)
  - Land: 275.30 km^{2} (106.29 sq mi)

Population (2021)
  - Total: 0
  - Density: 0/km^{2} (0/sq mi)
  - Change 2016-21: N/A
  - Dwellings: 0
- Time zone: UTC-5 (EST)
  - Summer (DST): UTC-4 (EDT)
- Highways: No major routes

Rivière-Vaseuse (French pronunciation: [ʁivjɛʁ vazøz]) is an unorganized territory in the Bas-Saint-Laurent region of Quebec, Canada.

It is named after the Vaseuse River, a tributary of the Matapédia River via the Milnikek River. This territory is uninhabited.

== Demographics ==
Historical census populations – Rivière-Vaseuse

Year	Pop.	±%
1981	0	—
1986	0	0.00%
1991	0	0.00%
1996	0	0.00%
2001	0	0.00%

Year	Pop.	±%
2006	0	0.00%
2011	0	0.00%
2016	0	0.00%
2021	0	0.00%

Source: Statistics Canada

== See also ==
- List of unorganized territories in Quebec
