= Saint-Alexandre-des-Lacs =

- Parish municipality
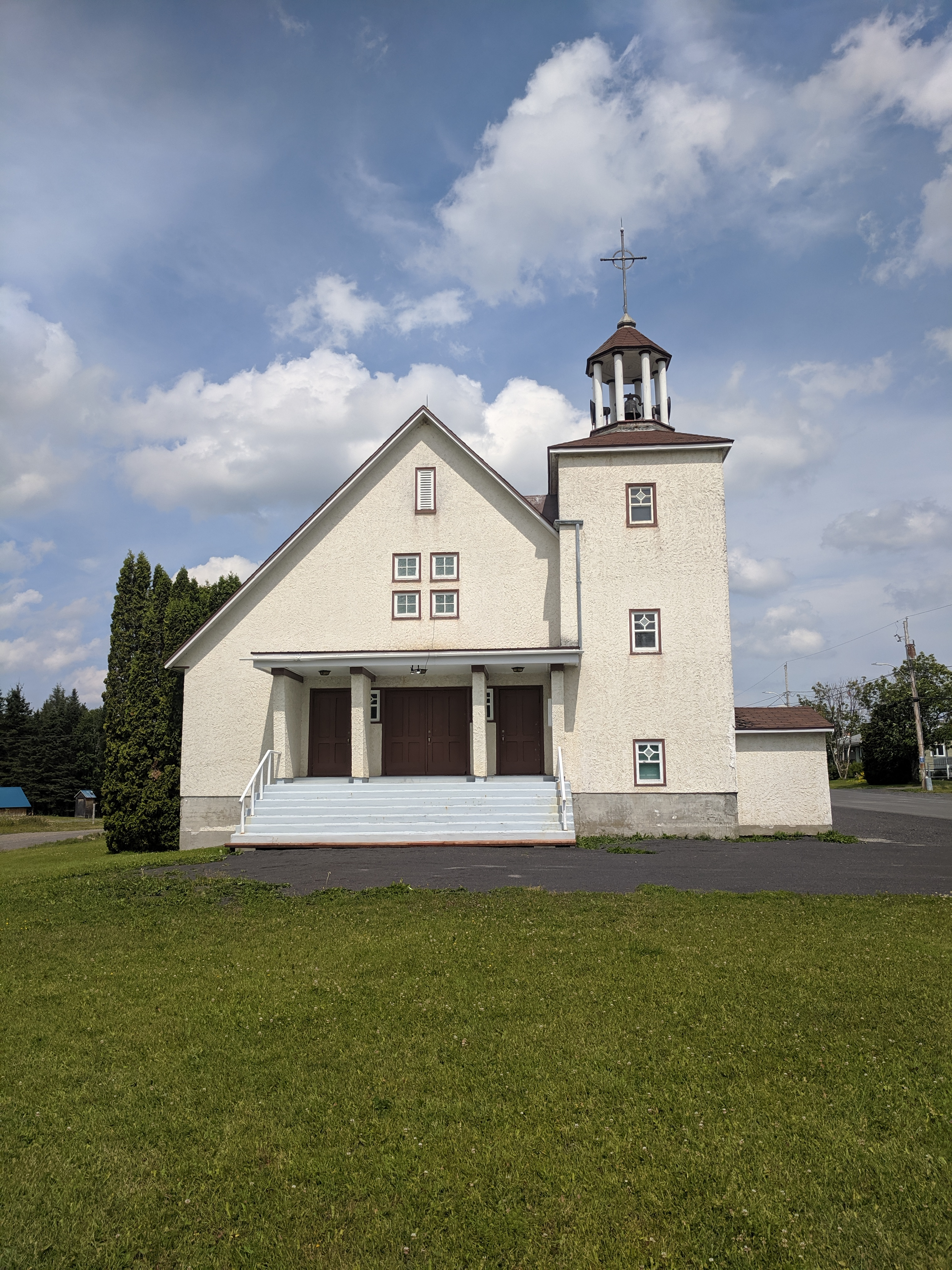
- Church of Saint-Alexandre-des-Lacs
- Motto(s): Solidarité, travail et honneur
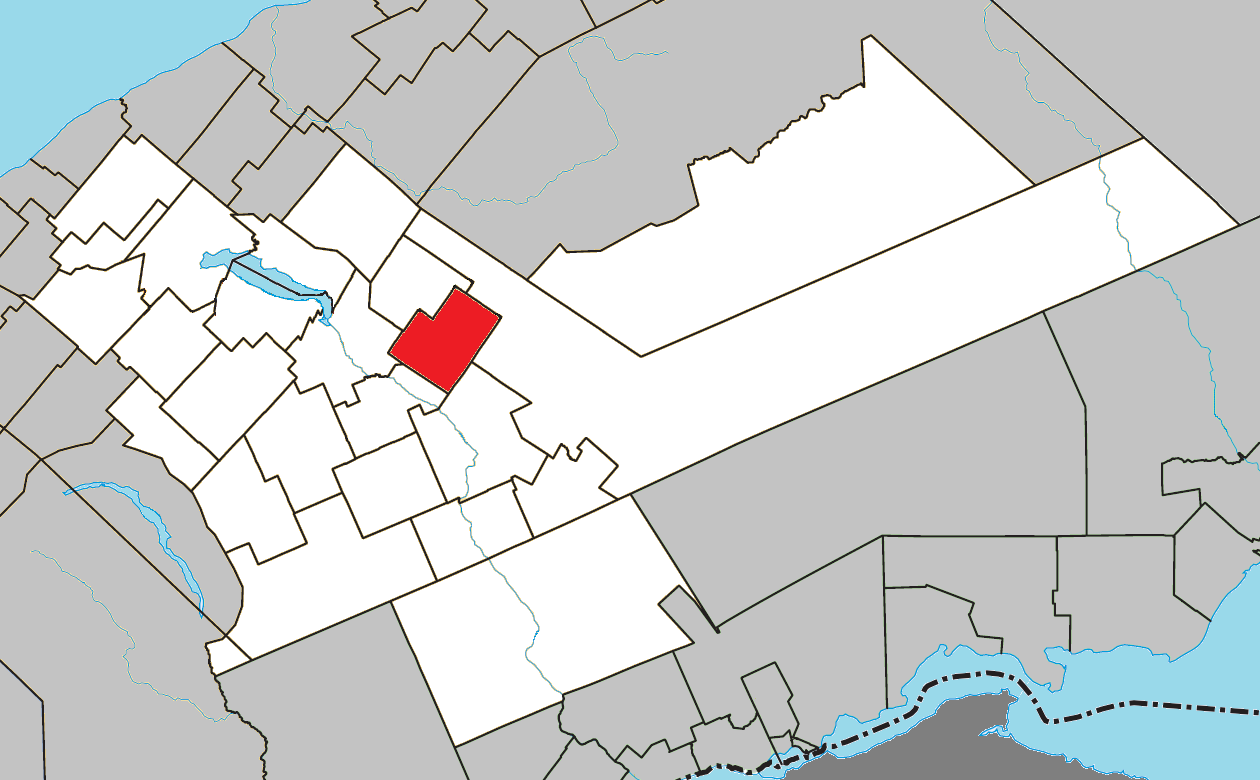
- Location within La Matapédia RCM

- Location in eastern Quebec
- Coordinates: 48°28′N 67°18′W
- Country: Canada
- Province: Quebec
- Region: Bas-Saint-Laurent
- RCM: La Matapédia
- Settled: c. 1910
- Constituted: January 1, 1965

Government
  - Mayor: Nelson Pilote
  - Fed. riding: Rimouski-Neigette—Mitis—Matapédia—Les Basques
  - Prov. riding: Matane-Matapédia-Mitis

Area
  - Total: 91.55 km^{2} (35.35 sq mi)
  - Land: 89.82 km^{2} (34.68 sq mi)

Population (2021)
  - Total: 298
  - Density: 3.3/km^{2} (8.5/sq mi)
  - Change 2016-21: ▲11.2%
  - Dwellings: 143
- Time zone: UTC−5 (EST)
  - Summer (DST): UTC−4 (EDT)
- Postal code(s): G0J 2C0
- Area codes: 418, 581
- Highways: No major routes
- Website: www.saintalexandredeslacs.com

Saint-Alexandre-des-Lacs (French pronunciation: [sɛ̃t‿alɛksɑ̃dʁ de lak]) is a parish municipality in Quebec, Canada.

The International Appalachian Trail goes through this municipality.

== History ==
Settlement of the area began in the 1910s. In 1920, the first mass was held there by priest Alexandre Bouillon. Two years later, a mission was established, originally called Notre-Dame-des-Champs and Lac-à-Pitre, but later on Saint Alexandre in honour of Alexandre Bouillon. In 1924, the post office and the first school opened.

In 1937, the area was destroyed by a brush fire that lasted about 20 days.

In 1964, the Parish Municipality of Saint-Alexandre-des-Lacs was formed out of territory from the municipalities of Saint-Tharcisius and Saint-Benoît-Joseph-Labre.

== Geography ==
The territory of the municipality, located in the northeast of the Matapedia Valley, is hilly and contains 17 small lakes, including Lac à Pitre, Lac Rouge, and Lac Fafard.

In addition to the namesake main population centre, the municipality also includes the hamlet of Lac-Pitre (48°27′54″N 67°19′19″W).

== Demographics ==
In the 2021 Census of Population conducted by Statistics Canada, Saint-Alexandre-des-Lacs had a population of 298 living in 129 of its 143 total private dwellings, a change of 11.2% from its 2016 population of 268. With a land area of 89.82 km^{2} (34.68 sq mi), it had a population density of 3.3/km^{2} (8.6/sq mi) in 2021.

Canada census – Saint-Alexandre-des-Lacs community profile

	2021	2016	2011
Population	298 (+11.2% from 2016)	327 (+26.7% from 2011)	258 (-6.2% from 2006)
Land area	89.82 km^{2} (34.68 sq mi)	90.07 km^{2} (34.78 sq mi)	89.77 km^{2} (34.66 sq mi)
Population density	3.3/km^{2} (8.5/sq mi)	3.6/km^{2} (9.3/sq mi)	2.9/km^{2} (7.5/sq mi)
Median age	45.6 (M: 45.2, F: 48.0)	53.2 (M: 52.2, F: 54.0)	50.4 (M: 50.7, F: 50.0)
Private dwellings	143 (total) 129 (occupied)	172 (total)	142 (total)
Median household income	$61,600	$42,624	$.N/A

Notes: 2011 income data for this area has been suppressed for data quality or confidentiality reasons.
References: 2021 2016 2011

Historical census populations – Saint-Alexandre-des-Lacs

Year	Pop.	±%
1966	520	—
1971	387	−25.6%
1976	301	−22.2%
1981	346	+15.0%
1986	363	+4.9%
1991	383	+5.5%

Year	Pop.	±%
1996	350	−8.6%
2001	324	−7.4%
2006	275	−15.1%
2011	258	−6.2%
2016	268	+3.9%
2021	298	+11.2%

Source: Statistics Canada

Mother tongue (2021):

- English as first language: 0%
- French as first language: 100%
- English and French as first languages: 0%
- Other as first language: 0%

== See also ==
- List of parish municipalities in Quebec
