= Lac-Alfred =

- Unorganized territory
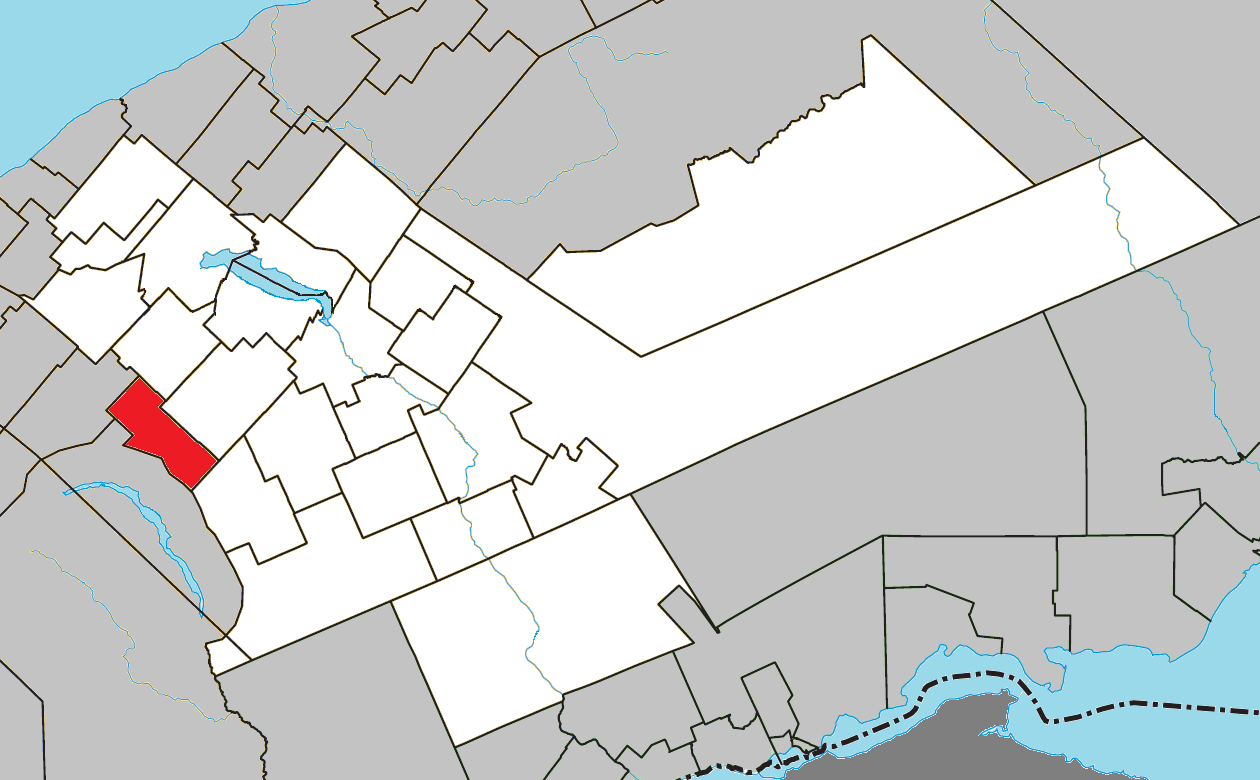
- Location within La Matapédia RCM

- Location in eastern Quebec
- Coordinates: 48°25′N 67°48′W
- Country: Canada
- Province: Quebec
- Region: Bas-Saint-Laurent
- RCM: La Matapédia
- Constituted: January 1, 1986

Government
  - Fed. riding: Rimouski-Neigette—Mitis—Matapédia—Les Basques
  - Prov. riding: Matane-Matapédia-Mitis

Area
  - Total: 77.06 km^{2} (29.75 sq mi)
  - Land: 77.53 km^{2} (29.93 sq mi)
- There is an apparent discrepancy between two authoritative sources.

Population (2021)
  - Total: 0
  - Density: 0/km^{2} (0/sq mi)
  - Change 2016-21: N/A
  - Dwellings: 0
- Time zone: UTC-5 (EST)
  - Summer (DST): UTC-4 (EDT)
- Highways: No major routes

Lac-Alfred (French pronunciation: [lak alfʁɛd]) is an unorganized territory in the Bas-Saint-Laurent region of Quebec, Canada.

Situated in the Matapédia Valley, it is named after the small Lake Alfred (48°25′21″N 67°47′30″W) in the northwestern part of the territory. The lake rests at the foot of Mont Saint-Pierre (48°25′08″N 67°45′59″W), which reaches 906 metres (2,972 ft) and is also known as Montagne du Radar (Radar Mountain) or Montagne de la Tour (Tower Mountain) due to an old fire tower or lookout that was built upon it.

The territory is used extensively for logging.

== Demographics ==
Historical census populations – Lac-Alfred

Year	Pop.	±%
1996	0	—
2001	0	0.00%
2006	0	0.00%

Year	Pop.	±%
2011	0	0.00%
2016	0	0.00%
2021	0	0.00%

Source: Statistics Canada

== See also ==
- List of unorganized territories in Quebec
