= History of bus transport via Rimouski =

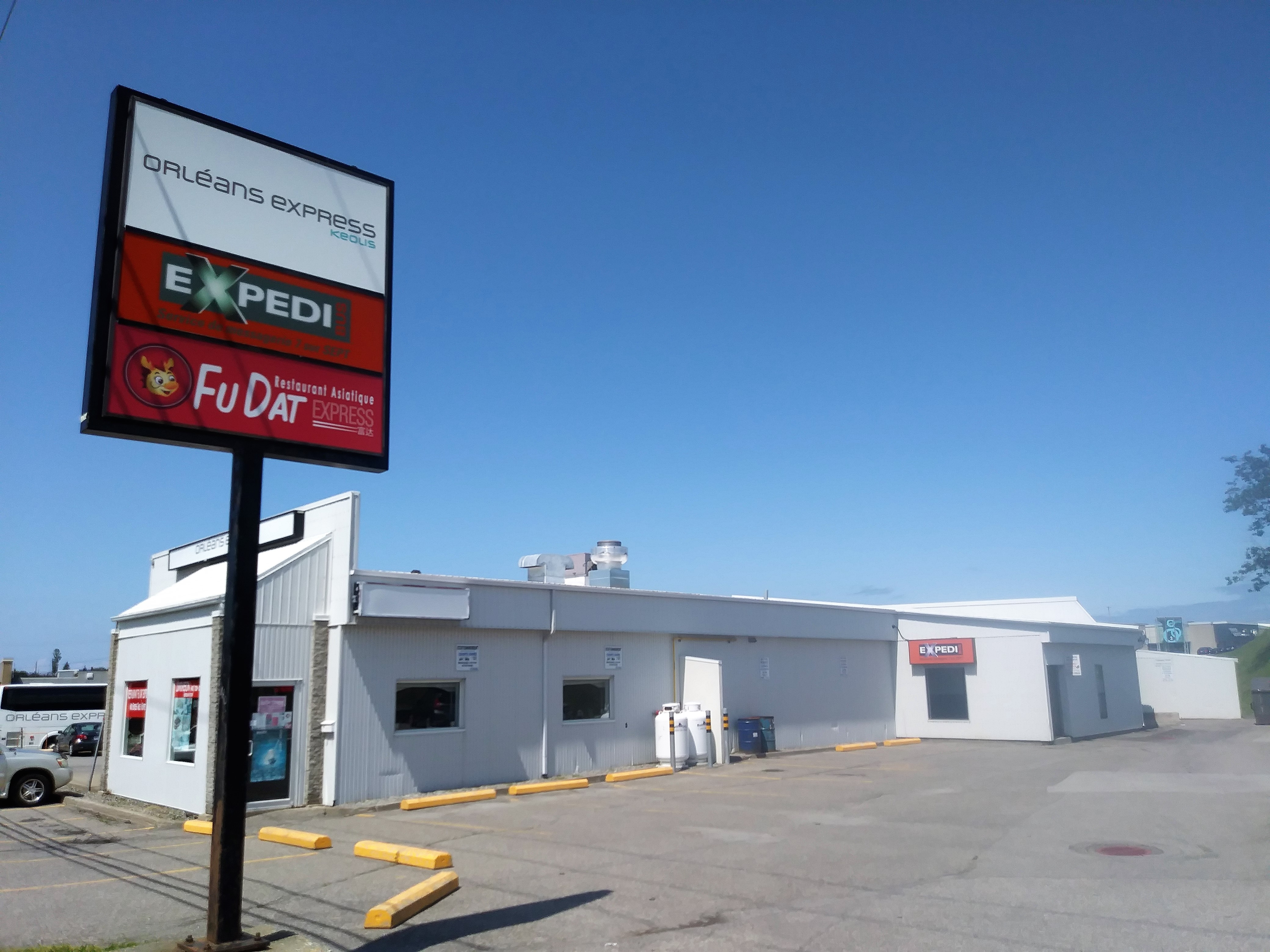
- Orléans Express Station in Rimouski

General information
- Location: 90 Avenue Léonidas S, Rimouski, Quebec; Canada
- Owner: Orléans Express
Location

The city of Rimouski located in the administrative region of Bas-Saint-Laurent, in the province of Quebec, in Canada, has known several bus terminals throughout its history. Several carriers have served this territory. In 1996, more than 200,000 travelers per year passed through the Rimouski bus terminal.

== History of bus transport via Rimouski ==
Launch of a bus service in 1924

A daily bus service (twice a day) connecting Rimouski and the Hôtel des Touristes in Sainte-Luce was launched on July 14, 1924. The departure was from the Hôtel St-Laurent (at 6:15 am) in Rimouski by following rue St-Germain towards the river, rue Tessier, rue de l'Évêché, avenue de la Cathédrale, rue St-Germain est and from there, along Chemin du Littoral, to your destination, either Sainte-Luce; the bus returned to Rimouski at 8:30 a.m.

Bus service in 1927 between Rimouski and Rivière-du-Loup

A new bus service linking Rimouski and Rivière-du-Loup was launched by MM. Baillargeon and Pigeon, of St-Magloire, county of Bellechasse. The lighted and airy Dodge-type bus capable of carrying 21 passengers served this route daily, except Sunday. The bus left in the morning at 7:00 a.m. from Rivière-du-Loup and arrived around 10:00 a.m. in Rimouski. For the return trip, the bus left Rimouski at 3:00 pm to arrive at its starting point around 6:30 pm The bus stops at each of the parishes on its route.

Accident in 1928 of a bus falling down a bridge

On August 17, 1928, a passenger transport bus doing daily Rimouski-Rivière-du-Loup service fell about 40 feet down a bridge at Rivière Trois-Pistoles, or about a mile to the east of the village of Trois-Pistoles. Six people were injured, including the driver, Mr. Lamelin, who was the most seriously injured.

Biencourt-Rimouski bus service in 1937

In an ordinance of December 16, 1937, the Public Services Commission granted a bus service license between Biencourt and Rimouski to Mr. Albert Lavoie.

Three regular bus services in 1938 attached to Rimouski

In 1938, three companies offered regular daily bus service from Rimouski:

- The first service served the riparian municipalities between Rimouski and Matane, over a 60-mile route;
- The second offered a daily service over approximately 65 miles between Rimouski and Biencourt, serving the communities of Sainte-Blandine, Saint-Narcisse, L'Esprit-Saint, Lac-des-Aigles and Biencourt;
- The third made the trip for about 30 miles, twice a day, between Rimouski and Saint-François-Xavier-des-Hauteurs, passing through Pointe-au-Père, Sainte-Luce, Luceville, Saint-Donat and Saint-Gabriel.

Note: None of these services operated on Sundays.

In addition, a fourth bus service from Trois-Pistoles, served the communities of the county of Rivière-du-Loup, to the colonies of Saint-Médard and Saint-Guy in the county of Rimouski.

Bus service in 1939 between Hauteurs and Rimouski

A bus service between Les Hauteurs and Rimouski was inaugurated on May 10, 1939, for the second consecutive year. This service was offered by the contractor Antoine Lévesque who had built the passenger compartment of the coach during the winter of 1938–39. This coach could carry up to 25 passengers. This daily service included a departure at 8:00 am from Les Hauteurs, over a journey of approximately two hours to reach the terminus of Rimouski. The departure from Rimouski was at 4:00 p.m. for the return trip. The parishes served were behind Rimouski then benefited from two daily bus services, that of Rimouski-Biencourt, and Rimouski-Hauteurs. At the time, the bus service stopped operating in winter, because the roads were not cleared of snow.

Creation of the Cie d'Autobus Rimouski Ltée in 1945

According to the Gazette officielle du Québec, the letters patent were granted on January 10, 1945, to the Cie d'Autobus Rimouski Ltée whose founders were: Paul-Émile Gagnon, lawyer, Claude Gagnon, student, Lucienne Michaud, secretary, all three of Rimouski. The company was set up to trade in the transport of passengers and goods, particularly by means of omnibuses, buses, taxi-cabs, coaches, auto-trucks, motor vehicles or other means of public or private transport.

Bus transport by Edmond Gagnon in 1946

On December 20, 1946, Edmond Gagnon announced his offer of bus trips on the route from Mont-Joli to Sainte-Florence, Val-Brillant, La Rédemption, Price, Sanatorium, l'Ascension. His bus was based in Mont-Joli.

Request in 1948 to obtain a bus service license to serve Rimouski-Est airport

In April 1948, the Régie des Transports sat for two weeks in Rimouski a session to consider several requests for general transport or passenger transport permits (including in snowmobiles), in particular:

- Two entrepreneurs, MM. Alphée Gagnon and Noël Banville, both from Rimouski, had filed a separate request in April 1948 with the Régie des Transports in Rimouski in order to be able to offer passenger transport service to both the head, by bus and taxi, between the airport of Rimouski-est and the city of Rimouski. However, Mr. Banville's request also offered snowmobile service.
- Mr. Edmond Gagnon, of Mont-Joli, presented a request to be authorized to transport by bus and snowmobile, within the limits of the city of Mont-Joli, the faithful going to divine services on Sundays and days of party or coming back.
- Mr. Émile St-Pierre, from Rimouski presented a request to be authorized to operate a local bus service between Rimouski, Bic and St-Fabien, via Notre-Dame-du-Sacré-Coeur.

Offer of public transport by bus in 1949 and 1950

According to a 1949 advertisement, bus transportation with connection via Rimouski was offered on three routes:

- Gagnon bus: Mont-Joli - Matapédia;
- Harrison bus: Rimouski, Mont-Joli, Matane; from the Hôtel Manoir National in Rimouski;
- Autobus Lemelin: Lévis, Rimouski; from the Hôtel Georges VI, in Rimouski.

In September 1949, Mr. Albert Gagné put on sale his line of buses, comprising three bombers. The advertisement indicates the address of 121, rue St-Joseph, Rimouski.

End of the bus service in 1967 in Saint-Pie-X

The newspaper Le progress du Golfe mentions the end of the bus service in Saint-Pie-X; this service was no longer profitable for Cie d'Autobus Rimouski Ltée.

Merger of operation of school and public transport in 1968

Since August 28, 1968, school and public transporters in Rimouski and its suburbs have been under the control of the company "Votre Choix Transport". This company was incorporated in 1965 with the advent of the "Commission scolaire régionale du Bas Saint-Laurent". La Cie d'Autobus Rimouski Ltée, which had been offering public transport for 23 years, was acquired by "Votre Choix Transport", thus putting an end to the duplication of public transport services. This fleet of eight buses and all the equipment inherent to its maintenance has been transferred to the new carrier. Thus, since September 2, 1965, the rolling stock of the old company has been stored on the land of the purchaser located on the hill, at 52 rue Léonidas, where the head office is also located. Thus, the new company continued its offer of public transport service in all districts of the city without municipal subsidy.

Construction of a terminal station for "Le Voyageur" buses in 1969

The newspaper "Le progress du Golfe" mentioned in its October 17, 1969 edition that a terminal station (100 'X 40') for "Le Voyageur" buses will be built shortly on the grounds of the Hotel Georges VI.

Bus service between Les Hauteurs and Rimouski in 1986

A 1986 message indicates that a bus shuttles daily between Les Hauteurs and Rimouski. The bus leaves in the morning at Les Hauteurs at 6:45 am, passes through Saint-Gabriel, Saint-Donat, Luceville, Saint-Anaclet and arrives in Rimouski at 7:40 am. In the evening, the bus leaves the university for the opposite route.

Start of the Orléans Express carrier in 1996

A new bus terminal for the Orléans Express carrier was put into service on July 10, 1996, on Léonidas Street in Rimouski, thanks to an investment of $1.5 million. This terminus was owned by the Rimouski businessman Gaston Côté. The latter then became the new agent for Autocars Orléans Express in Rimouski. When it opened, the owners expected to be able to increase the daily frequency of the 18 departures and arrivals of coaches.

The terminal situs offers quick access to route 132 and to the section of Autoroute 20. When it opened, the new terminal offered a mechanical maintenance service for coaches, as well as a full catering service for users and travelers. In 1996, the new terminus had 28 direct workers and 12 indirect jobs.

Autocars La Chaudière - price in December 2003

The Desjardins Commercial Merit Award for the month of December 2003 was awarded to "Autocars La Chaudière" by the Chamber of Commerce of Entrepreneurs of Quebec. This company transported more than 300,000 people annually with a fleet of 25 vehicles (12 luxury coaches, school buses and four transport minibuses).

Since 2001, as part of its expansion, Autocars La Chaudière has acquired three bus companies: Autobus Daniel de Rimouski, Autobus Saint-Georges and Autobus Mitis.

Terminus Orléans Express in Rimouski

The Rimouski Orléans Express Terminus is a bus terminus located at 90 Avenue Léonidas, in Rimouski. In 1996, more than 200,000 travelers per year passed through this terminus. In 2019, the buses left from this Rimouski station in the direction of Sainte-Anne-des-Monts and Gaspé; towards Carleton-sur-Mer and Grande-Rivière, Quebec; and in the direction of Rivière-du-Loup and Quebec (city).
