= Saint-Charles-Garnier, Quebec =

Saint-Charles-Garnier
- Parish municipality
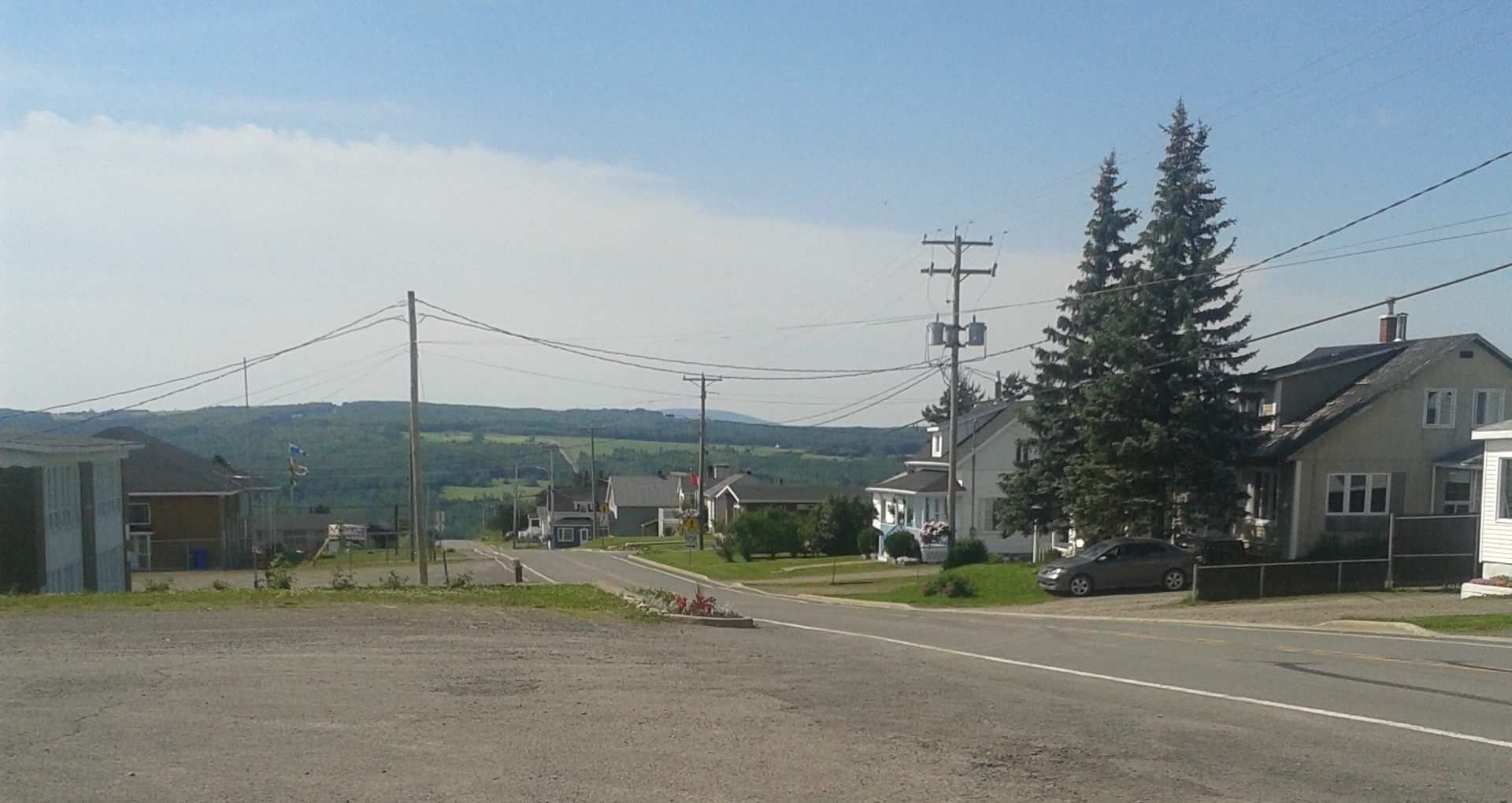
- Downtown Saint-Charles-Garnier

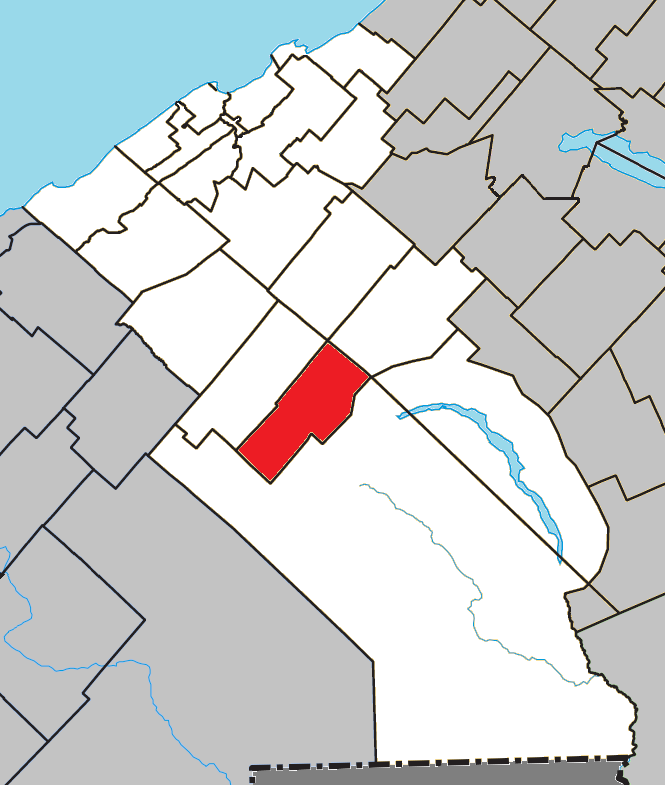
- Location within La Mitis RCM

- Location in eastern Quebec
- Coordinates: 48°20′N 68°03′W
- Country: Canada
- Province: Quebec
- Region: Bas-Saint-Laurent
- RCM: La Mitis
- Constituted: January 1, 1966
- Named for: Charles Garnier

Government
  - Mayor: Jean-Pierre Bélanger
  - Federal riding: Rimouski-Neigette—Mitis—Matapédia—Les Basques
  - Prov. riding: Matane-Matapédia-Mitis

Area
  - Total: 84.80 km^{2} (32.74 sq mi)
  - Land: 84.79 km^{2} (32.74 sq mi)

Population (2021)
  - Total: 222
  - Density: 2.6/km^{2} (6.7/sq mi)
  - Pop 2016-2021: ▼7.5%
  - Dwellings: 151
- Time zone: UTC−5 (EST)
  - Summer (DST): UTC−4 (EDT)
- Postal code(s): G0K 1K0
- Area codes: 418 and 581
- Highways: R-298
- Website: www.municipalite. saint-charles-garnier.qc.ca

Saint-Charles-Garnier (French pronunciation: [sɛ̃ ʃaʁl ɡaʁnje]) is a parish municipality in Quebec, Canada.

== History ==
Settlers began arriving in the area at the end of 1935. They came mainly from Priceville, Saint-Fabien, Sainte-Flavie, Saint-François-Xavier-des-Hauteurs and Saint-Simon-de-la-Baie-Ha! Ha!. A Catholic service was opened in 1937 and the first parish priest was appointed. The parish of Saint-Charles-Garnier was canonically erected in 1954. The municipality was officially created in 1966 and took the same name as the church.

== Demographics ==
In the 2021 Census of Population conducted by Statistics Canada, Saint-Charles-Garnier had a population of 222 living in 110 of its 151 total private dwellings, a change of −7.5% from its 2016 population of 240. With a land area of 84.79 km^{2} (32.74 sq mi), it had a population density of 2.6/km^{2} (6.8/sq mi) in 2021.

Canada census – Saint-Charles-Garnier community profile

| | 2021 | 2016 | 2011 |
| Population | 222 (-7.5% from 2016) | 240 (-11.4% from 2011) | 271 (-9.1% from 2006) |
| Land area | 84.79 km^{2} (32.74 sq mi) | 84.77 km^{2} (32.73 sq mi) | 85.07 km^{2} (32.85 sq mi) |
| Population density | 2.6/km^{2} (6.7/sq mi) | 2.8/km^{2} (7.3/sq mi) | 3.2/km^{2} (8.3/sq mi) |
| Median age | 56.8 (M: 56.8, F: 56.0) | 53.6 (M: 53.2, F: 54.0) | 48.9 (M: 50.5, F: 47.8) |
| Private dwellings | 151 (total) 10 (occupied) | 146 (total) | 149 (total) |
| Median household income | $n/a | $n/a | $36,312 |

References: 2021 2016 2011

== See also ==
- List of parish municipalities in Quebec
