= Ferrée River (lac des Eaux Mortes) =

- Location within Quebec

Location
- Country: Canada
- Province: Quebec
- Region: Bas-Saint-Laurent
- Regional County Municipality: Rimouski-Neigette Regional County Municipality and La Mitis Regional County Municipality
- Municipality: Rimouski Wildlife Reserve, Lac-des-Eaux-Mortes

Physical characteristics
- Source: Mountain stream
  - location: Rimouski Wildlife Reserve
  - coordinates: 48°12′16″N 68°09′22″W
  - elevation: 397 m
- Mouth: Mistigougèche River (lac des Eaux Mortes)
  - location: Lac-des-Eaux-Mortes
  - coordinates: 48°13′25″N 68°05′58″W
  - elevation: 266 m
- Length: 7.0 km (4.3 mi)

Basin features
- Tributaries
  - right: (Upward from the mouth) Lac Partel outlet, Lac David outlet, Lac du Faisan outlet

The rivière Ferrée flows in the administrative region of Bas-Saint-Laurent, in the province of Quebec, in Canada, in the regional county municipalities of:

- MRC of Rimouski-Neigette Regional County Municipality: Rimouski Wildlife Reserve;
- MRC of La Mitis Regional County Municipality: unorganized territory Lac-des-Eaux-Mortes (Rimouski county).

The Ferrée river is a tributary of the southwest shore of the Lac des Eaux Mortes which is crossed by the Mistigougèche River; the latter flows to the southwest shore of the Mitis River, which flows northwest to the southeast coast of the St. Lawrence River where it flows at height of Sainte-Flavie and Grand-Métis.

== Geography ==
The Ferrée river rises at Lac Ferré (length: 1.0 kilometre (0.62 mi); altitude: 397 metres (1,302 ft)), in the form of a hook, located in the northern part of the Rimouski Wildlife Reserve. The mouth of Lac Ferré is located 21.4 kilometres (13.3 mi) north of the border with New Brunswick, 36.1 kilometres (22.4 mi) southeast of the south-eastern shore of St. Lawrence River, at 21.7 kilometres (13.5 mi) south-east of the center of the village of Saint-Narcisse-de-Rimouski, at 18.6 kilometres (11.6 mi) south-west of the village center of Les Hauteurs and 0.8 kilometres (0.50 mi) south-east of the northwest limit of the Rimouski Wildlife Reserve.

From its source, the Ferrée river flows over 7.0 kilometres (4.3 mi), divided into the following segments:

- 1.5 kilometres (0.93 mi) south-east, up to the outlet of "Lac du Faisan" (coming from the south);
- 0.8 kilometres (0.50 mi) eastward, to the outlet of Lac David (coming from the south);
- 2.4 kilometres (1.5 mi) northeasterly, to the limit of the regional county municipality of La Mitis Regional County Municipality;
- 1.2 kilometres (0.75 mi) north-east, to the bridge of a forest road;
- 1.1 kilometres (0.68 mi) northeasterly, to its confluence.

The Ferrée river flows on the western shore of the Lac des Eaux Mortes, on the north side of the Baie de la Ferrée and opposite the confluence of the Source stream. This confluence is located 2.3 kilometres (1.4 mi) southeast of the southeastern limit of the municipality Les Hauteurs, 4.5 kilometres (2.8 mi) upstream of the dam mouth of Lac des Eaux Mortes and 37.5 kilometres (23.3 mi) southeast of the southeast coast of the St. Lawrence River.

== Toponymy ==
The river Ferrée toponym was formalized on December 5, 1968 at the Commission de toponymie du Québec.

== See also ==
- La Mitis Regional County Municipality
- Rimouski Wildlife Reserve
- Lac-des-Eaux-Mortes, an unorganized territory
- St. Lawrence River
- Mitis River, a stream
- Mistigougèche River, a stream
- Lac des Eaux Mortes, a body of water
