= La Mitis Regional County Municipality =

La Mitis
- Regional county municipality
- Coordinates: 48.08°N 68.02°W
- Country: Canada
- Province: Quebec
- Region: Bas-Saint-Laurent
- Effective: January 1, 1982
- County seat: Mont-Joli

Government
  - Type: Prefecture
  - Prefect: Michel Côté

Area
  - Total: 2,538.80 km^{2} (980.24 sq mi)
  - Land: 2,281.25 km^{2} (880.80 sq mi)

Population (2016)
  - Total: 18,210
  - Density: 8/km^{2} (21/sq mi)
  - Change 2011–2016: ▼3.9%
  - Dwellings: 9,692
- Time zone: UTC−5 (EST)
  - Summer (DST): UTC−4 (EDT)
- Area codes: 418 and 581
- Website: www.lamitis.ca

La Mitis is a regional county municipality in the Bas-Saint-Laurent region in eastern Quebec, Canada on the Gaspé peninsula. It is named for the Mitis River (The Mitis) which has its source in the region (at Lac Inférieur) and flows through the central part of the region before emptying into the Saint Lawrence River.

The county seat is in Mont-Joli.

== Subdivisions ==
There are 18 subdivisions within the RCM:

Cities & Towns (2)

- Métis-sur-Mer
- Mont-Joli

Municipalities (7)

- Grand-Métis
- Les Hauteurs
- Padoue
- Sainte-Angèle-de-Mérici
- Sainte-Jeanne-d'Arc-de-la-Mitis
- Sainte-Luce
- Saint-Gabriel-de-Rimouski

Parishes (6)

- La Rédemption
- Saint-Charles-Garnier
- Saint-Donat
- Sainte-Flavie
- Saint-Joseph-de-Lepage
- Saint-Octave-de-Métis

Villages (1)

- Price

Unorganized Territory (2)

- Lac-à-la-Croix
- Lac-des-Eaux-Mortes

== Demographics ==
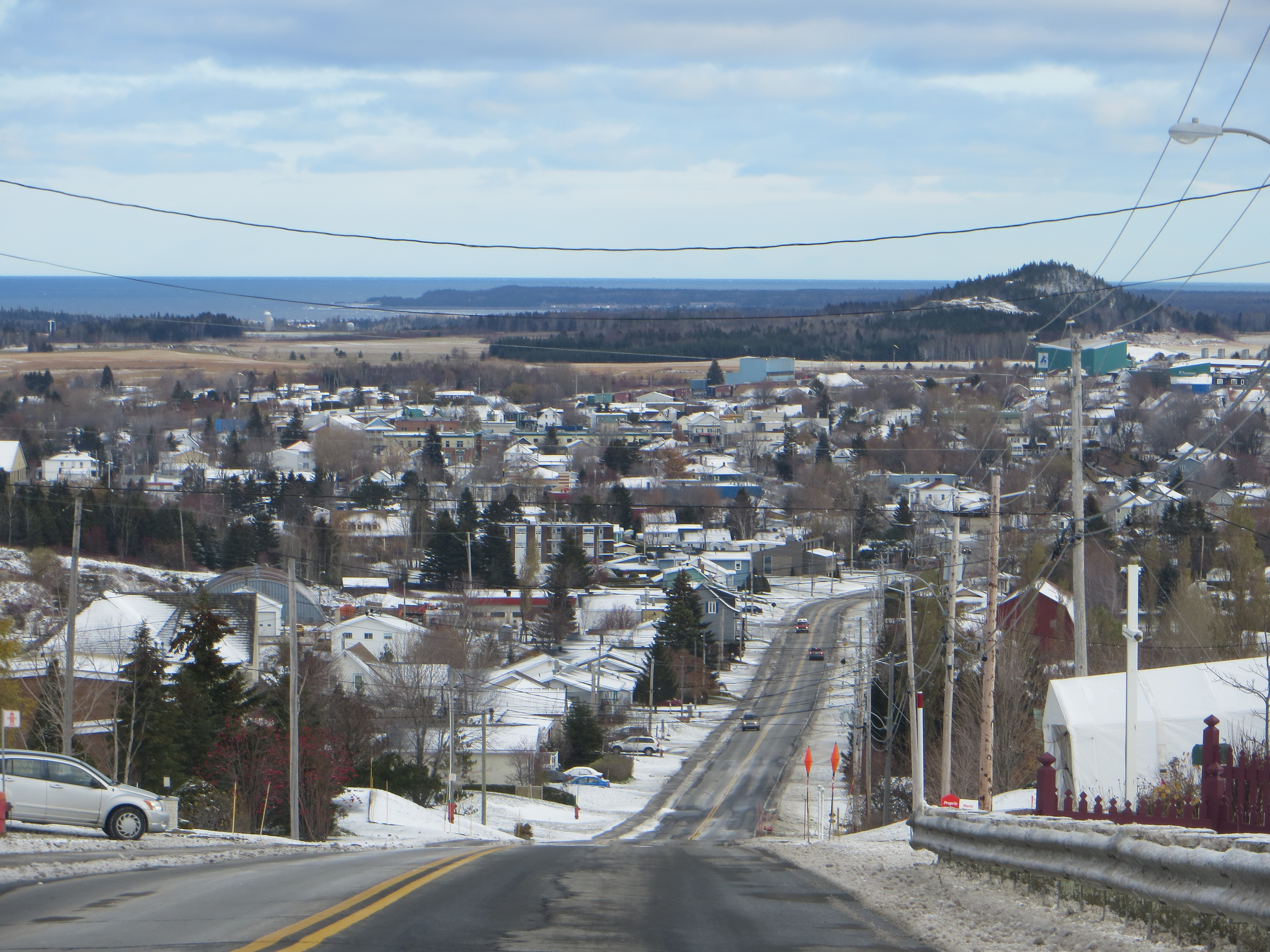
Mont-Joli

=== Population ===
Canada census – La Mitis community profile

	2021	2016	2011
Population	18,363 (+0.8% from 2016)	18,210 (-3.9% from 2011)	18,942 (-2.2% from 2006)
Land area	2,275.56 km^{2} (878.60 sq mi)	2,281.25 km^{2} (880.80 sq mi)	2,279.22 km^{2} (880.01 sq mi)
Population density	8.1/km^{2} (21/sq mi)	8.0/km^{2} (21/sq mi)	8.3/km^{2} (21/sq mi)
Median age	50.8 (M: 50.0, F: 51.2)	49.5 (M: 49.0, F: 50.1)	48.0 (M: 47.3, F: 48.6)
Private dwellings	9,842 (total) 8,492 (occupied)	9,692 (total)	9,471 (total)
Median household income	$57,600	$48,996	$42,351

References: 2021 2016 2011

Historical Census Data – La Mitis Regional County Municipality, Quebec

Year	Pop.	±%
1991	20,157	—
1996	20,160	+0.0%
2001	19,326	−4.1%

Year	Pop.	±%
2006	19,365	+0.2%
2011	18,942	−2.2%
2016	18,210	−3.9%

=== Language ===
Canada Census Mother Tongue – La Mitis Regional County Municipality, Quebec
Census	Total	French			English			French & English			Other		
Year	Responses	Count	Trend	Pop %	Count	Trend	Pop %	Count	Trend	Pop %	Count	Trend	Pop %
2016	17,920	17,665	▼2.9%	98.58%	140	▲7.7%	0.78%	65	0.0%	0.36%	50	0.0%	0.28%
2011	18,430	18,185	▼1.6%	98.67%	130	▼25.7%	0.71%	65	▲44.4%	0.35%	50	▼58.3%	0.27%
2006	18,815	18,475	▼0.05%	98.19%	175	▲25.0%	0.93%	45	▼18.2%	0.24%	120	▲480.0%	0.64%
2001	18,705	18,485	▼4.4%	98.82%	140	▲3.7%	0.75%	55	▼15.4%	0.29%	25	▼44.4%	0.13%
1996	19,580	19,335	n/a	98.75%	135	n/a	0.69%	65	n/a	0.33%	45	n/a	0.23%

== Transportation ==
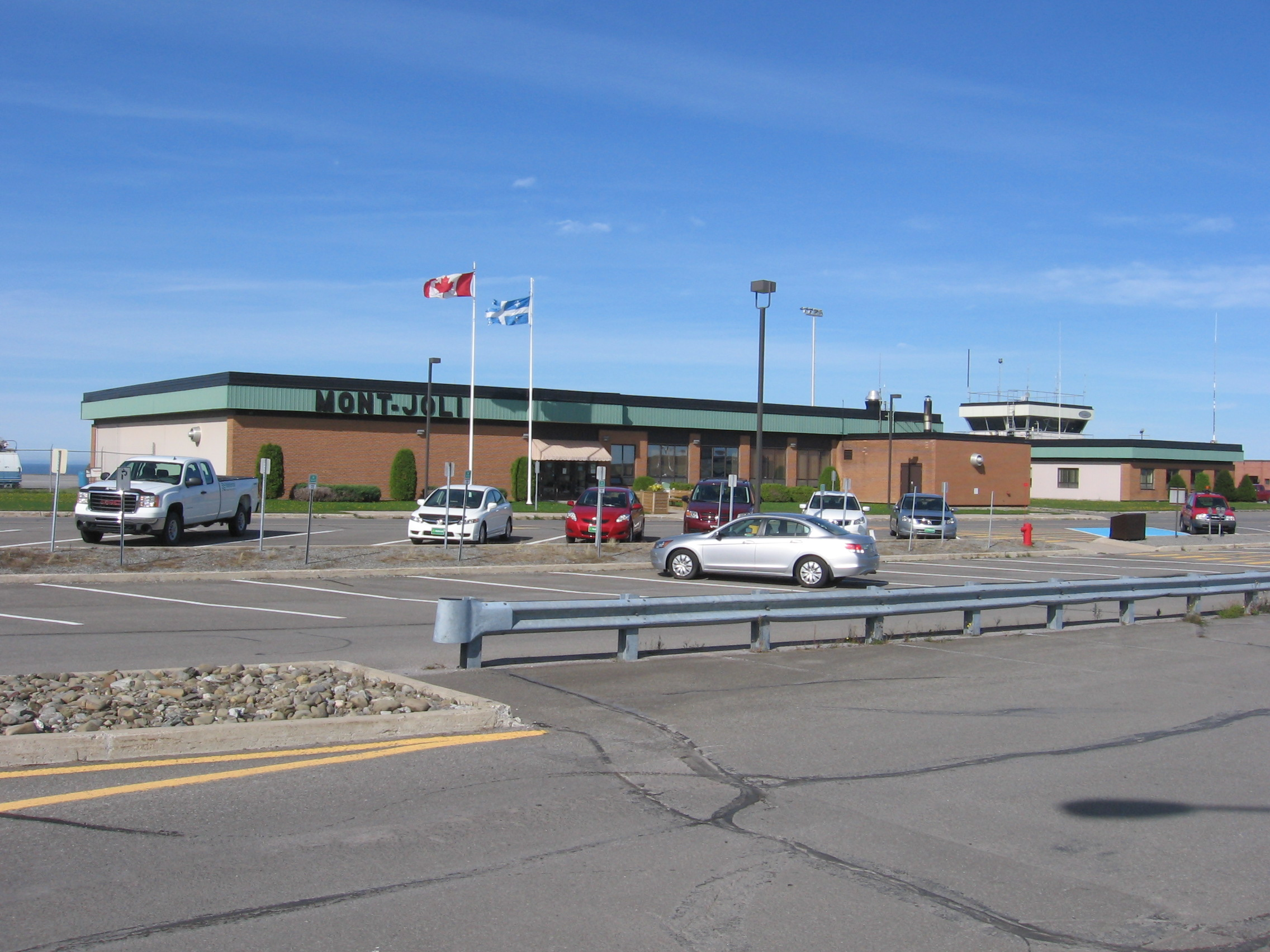
Mont-Joli Airport

=== Access routes ===
Highways and numbered routes that run through the municipality, including external routes that start or finish at the county border:

- Autoroutes
  - A-20
- Principal Highways
  - R-132
- Secondary Highways
  - R-234
  - R-298
- External Routes
  - None

== See also ==
- List of regional county municipalities and equivalent territories in Quebec
- Seignory of Lac-Mitis
- Mitis Seignory
