= Ferrée River =

Ferrée River (or rivière Ferrée (in French)) may refer to:

- Ferrée River (lac des Eaux Mortes), in Lac-des-Eaux-Mortes, La Mitis Regional County Municipality, Bas-Saint-Laurent, Quebec, Canada
- Ferrée River (Montmorency River tributary), in Boischatel, La Côte-de-Beaupré Regional County Municipality, Capitale-Nationale, Quebec, Canada
- Ferrée River (Anticosti Island), on Anticosti Island in Minganie Regional County Municipality, Côte-Nord, Quebec, Canada (see List of rivers of Quebec#Anticosti Island)
- Ferrée River (Ferré Lake), a tributary of the Rimouski River in Rimouski-Neigette, Bas-Saint-Laurent, Quebec, Canada
- Ferrée River (L'Islet), in Saint-Roch-des-Aulnaies, L'Islet Regional County Municipality, Chaudière-Appalaches, Quebec, Canada
- Ferrée River (Micosas River tributary), in Saguenay–Lac-Saint-Jean, Quebec, Canada (see List of rivers of Quebec#Tributaries of Lac Saint-Jean)
- Ferrée Rivière (Sainte-Marguerite River tributary), in Quebec, Canada (see List of rivers of Quebec#North-shore Sainte-Marguerite River and tributaries eastward)
- Ferrée River (Sapins River tributary), in Sainte-Françoise, Quebec, Canada (see List of rivers of Quebec#Watershed of Trois-Pistoles River and Eastern tributaries)
