= Saint Flavia =

Saint Flavia may refer to:

- Flavia Domitilla (wife of Clemens)
- Flavia Domitilla (Catholic saint)
- Flavia (saint)

== See also ==
- Saint Placidus (martyr)
