= Saint-Donat, Quebec =

Saint-Donat, Quebec may refer to:

- Saint-Donat, Lanaudière, Quebec in Matawinie Regional County Municipality
- Saint-Donat, Bas-Saint-Laurent, Quebec in La Mitis Regional County Municipality
