= Mitis Seignory =

Coordinates: 48.6167°N 68.0000°W

Mitis Seignory (Quebec)

The Mitis Seignory (French: seigneurie de Mitis) is a forest and wildlife territory located in La Mitis Regional County Municipality in eastern Quebec. It was a seignory during the French colonisation of New France.

== History ==
The Mitis Seignory was first granted to Jean-Baptiste de Peiras by the New France's governor, Louis de Buade de Frontenac, on May 6, 1675.

The Scottish Mathew MacNider acquired the seignory in 1802 and his brother, John MacNider, bought it in 1807. In fact the MacNider family was the owner of the Mitis Seignory for almost 50 years.

== Territory ==
At the time of its granting in 1675 the territory of the seignory measured two leagues along the Saint Lawrence River by two leagues away from the river. It is entirely included inside La Mitis Regional County Municipality in Bas-Saint-Laurent.
