= Seignory of Lac-Mitis =

Coordinates: 48.2833°N 67.7500°W

Seignory of Lac-Mitis (Quebec)

The seignory of Lac-Mitis (French: seigneurie du Lac-Mitis) was a seignory during the French colonisation of New France. It was located in present-day La Mitis Regional County Municipality in Bas-Saint-Laurent. It was granted to Louis Rouer de Villeray by Louis de Buade de Frontenac, the governor of New France, on February 10, 1693.
