= Saint-Joseph-de-Lepage =

- Parish municipality
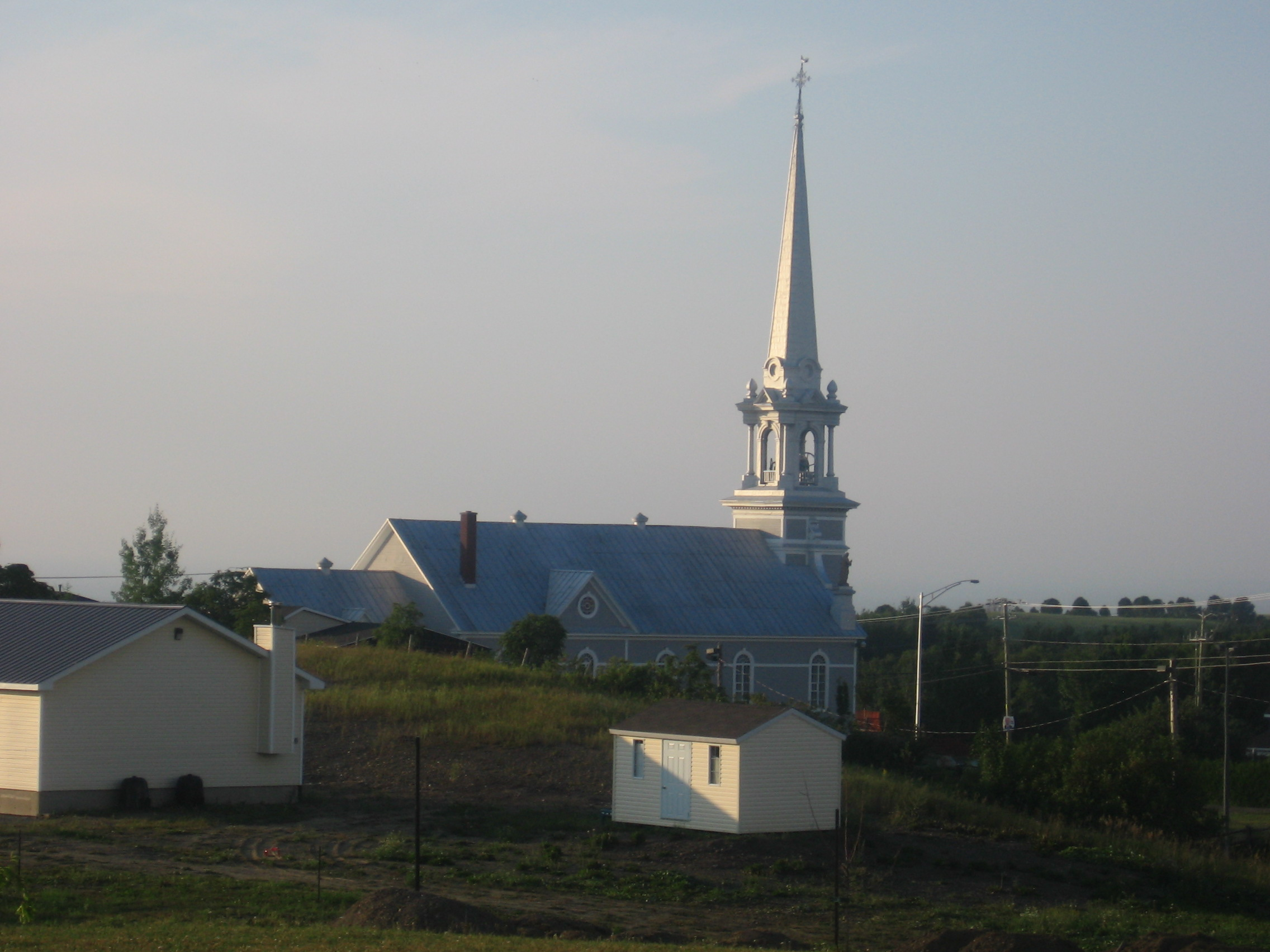
- Church of Saint-Joseph-de-Lepage

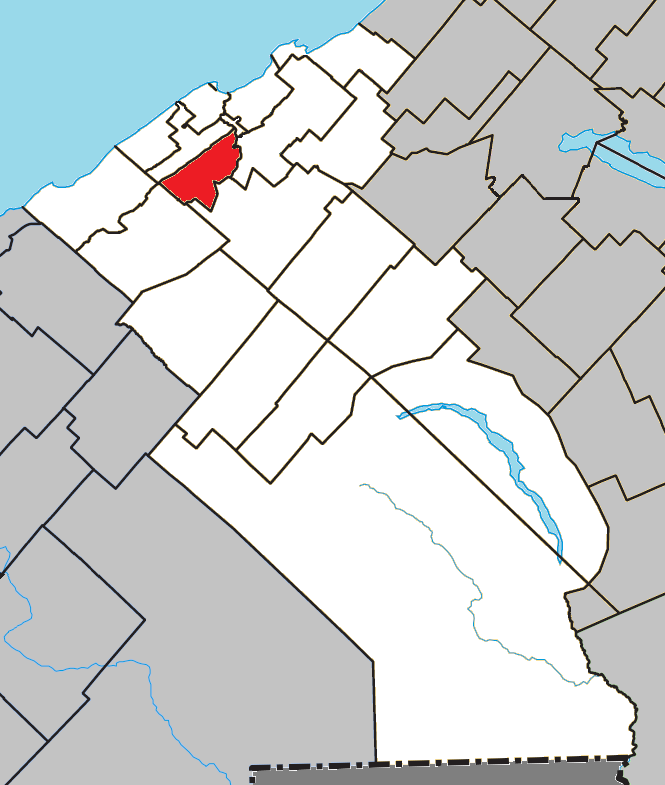
- Location within La Mitis RCM

- Location in eastern Quebec
- Coordinates: 48.5757865°N 68.1721856°W
- Country: Canada
- Province: Quebec
- Region: Bas-Saint-Laurent
- RCM: La Mitis
- Constituted: September 29, 1873

Government
  - Mayor: Magella Roussel
  - Federal riding: Rimouski-Neigette—Mitis—Matapédia—Les Basques
  - Prov. riding: Matane-Matapédia-Mitis

Area
  - Total: 32.00 km^{2} (12.36 sq mi)
  - Land: 30.98 km^{2} (11.96 sq mi)

Population (2021)
  - Total: 590
  - Density: 19/km^{2} (49/sq mi)
  - Pop 2016-2021: ▲12.8%
  - Dwellings: 260
- Time zone: UTC−5 (EST)
  - Summer (DST): UTC−4 (EDT)
- Postal code(s): G5H 3N8
- Area codes: 418 and 581
- Highways: R-132
- Website: www.municipalite.saint-joseph-de-lepage.qc.ca

Saint-Joseph-de-Lepage (French pronunciation: [sɛ̃ ʒozɛf də ləpaʒ]) is a parish municipality in La Mitis Regional County Municipality, in the Bas-Saint-Laurent region of Quebec, Canada.

It is located 5 km south-east of Mont-Joli, in the Matapédia River Valley. The village is 350 km north east of Québec city and 360 km west of Gaspé. The nearest towns are Mont-Joli, and Rimouski, the latter of which lies 40 km to the south-east.

Saint-Joseph-de-Lepage takes its name from the colonial lordship, the Seigneurie Lepage-et-Thibierge, which was the early governing authority in the area. Its 500 residents work largely in agriculture and forestry.

The ecclesiastical parish of the same name is in the Archdiocese of Rimouski.

== History ==
The territory occupied by the parish municipality of Saint-Joseph-de-Lepage was first granted to Gabriel Thivierge and Louis Lepage and became known as the seigneury of Lepage-et-Thivierge. Later, this seigneury became the Seignory of Rimouski, which for a long time belonged to the Lepage family. The parish of Saint-Joseph-de-Lepage was canonically erected on 21 April 1873. The municipality of Saint-Joseph-de-Lepage was officially created on 29 September 1873, by a detachment from Sainte-Flavie. The presbytery was built in 1873, and the wooden church was built in 1875. The caisse populaire was founded on March 7, 1940.

== Demographics ==
In the 2021 Census of Population conducted by Statistics Canada, Saint-Joseph-de-Lepage had a population of 590 living in 223 of its 260 total private dwellings, a change of +12.8% from its 2016 population of 523. With a land area of 30.98 km^{2} (11.96 sq mi), it had a population density of 19.0/km^{2} (49.3/sq mi) in 2021.

Historical census populations – Saint-Joseph-de-Lepage

Year	Pop.	±%
1881	556	—
1891	401	−27.9%
1901	414	+3.2%
1911	400	−3.4%
1921	481	+20.2%
1931	583	+21.2%
1941	521	−10.6%
1951	447	−14.2%
1956	463	+3.6%
1961	450	−2.8%
1966	434	−3.6%

Year	Pop.	±%
1971	379	−12.7%
1976	392	+3.4%
1981	507	+29.3%
1986	613	+20.9%
1991	590	−3.8%
1996	587	−0.5%
2001	586	−0.2%
2006	545	−7.0%
2011	527	−3.3%
2016	523	−0.8%
2021	590	+12.8%

Source: Statistics Canada

Private dwellings (occupied by usual residents): 223

Languages:

- French as first language: 98.3%
- English as first language: 0.8%

== See also ==
- List of parish municipalities in Quebec
