= Lac-à-la-Croix, Quebec =

Lac-à-la-Croix
- Unorganized Territory
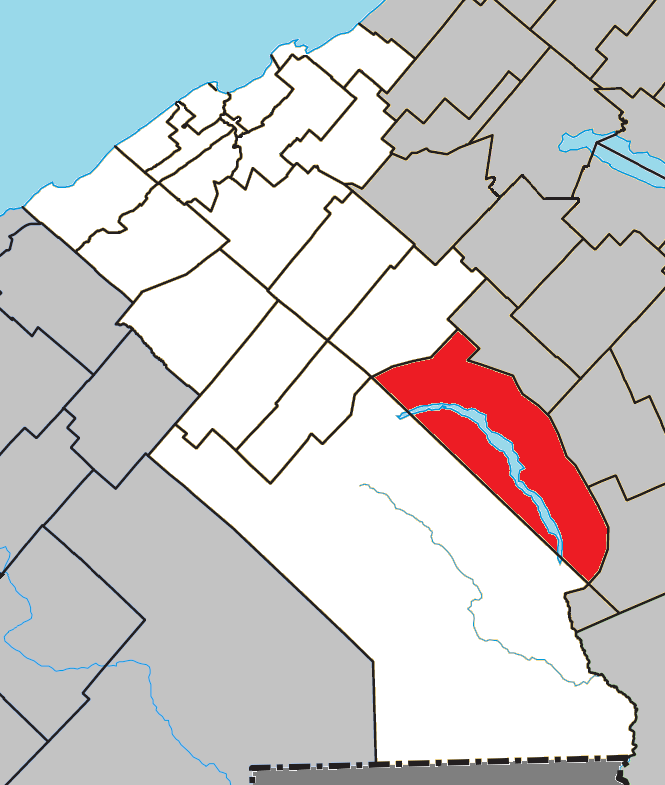
- Location within La Mitis RCM

- Location in eastern Quebec
- Coordinates: 48.3°N 67.78°W
- Country: Canada
- Province: Quebec
- Region: Bas-Saint-Laurent
- RCM: La Mitis
- Established: January 1, 1986

Government
  - Federal riding: Rimouski-Neigette—Mitis—Matapédia—Les Basques
  - Prov. riding: Matane-Matapédia-Mitis

Area
  - Total: 240.50 km^{2} (92.86 sq mi)
  - Land: 224.46 km^{2} (86.66 sq mi)

Population (2011)
  - Total: 0
  - Density: 0/km^{2} (0/sq mi)
  - Pop 2006-2011: 0.0%
  - Dwellings: 0
- Time zone: UTC−5 (EST)
  - Summer (DST): UTC−4 (EDT)
- Area codes: 418 and 581
- Highways: No major routes

Lac-à-la-Croix (French pronunciation: [lak a la kʁwa]) is an unorganized territory in the Canadian province of Quebec, located in the La Mitis Regional County Municipality.

== See also ==
- List of unorganized territories in Quebec
