= Saint-Donat, Bas-Saint-Laurent =

Saint-Donat
- Parish municipality
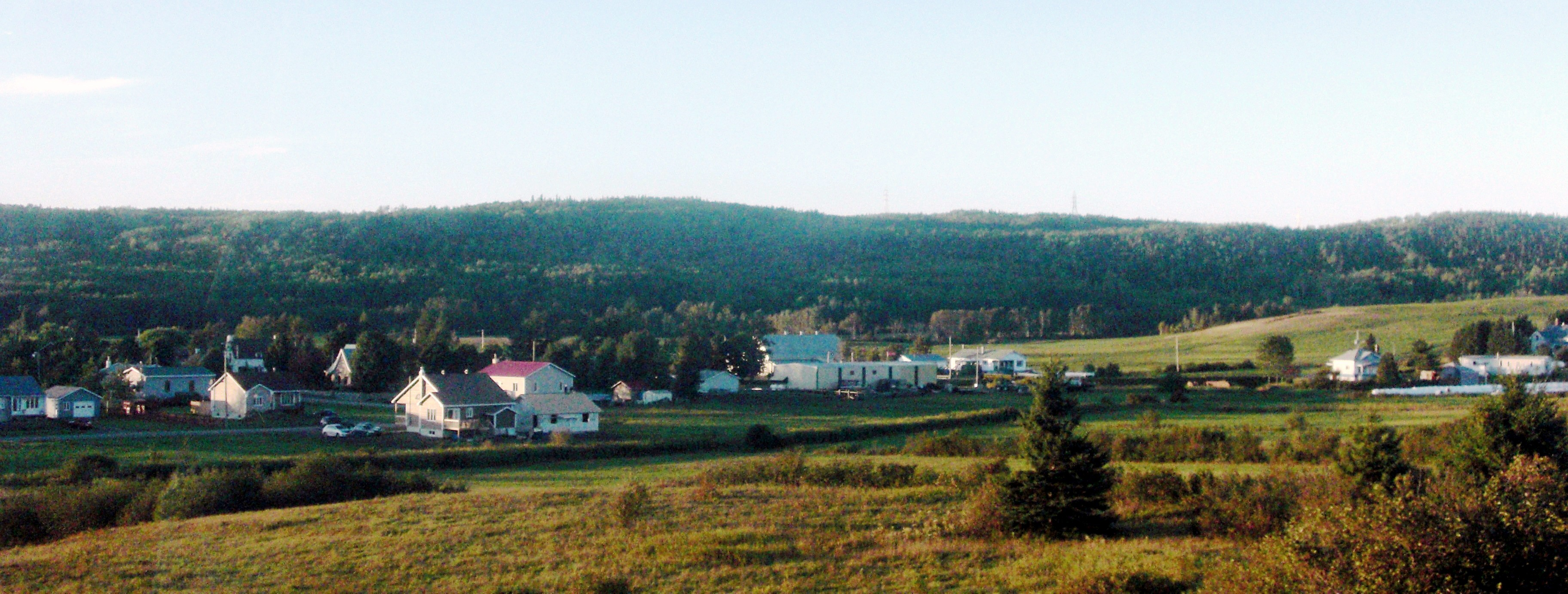

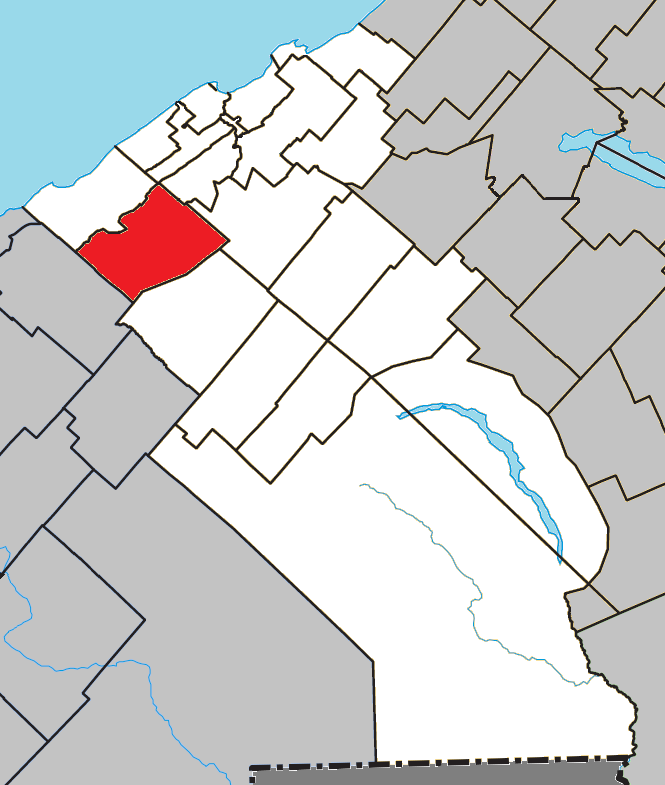
- Location within La Mitis RCM

- Location in eastern Quebec
- Coordinates: 48.4970265°N 68.2488766°W
- Country: Canada
- Province: Quebec
- Region: Bas-Saint-Laurent
- RCM: La Mitis
- Constituted: March 10, 1869

Government
  - Mayor: André Lechasseur
  - Federal riding: Rimouski-Neigette—Mitis—Matapédia—Les Basques
  - Prov. riding: Matane-Matapédia-Mitis

Area
  - Total: 95.30 km^{2} (36.80 sq mi)
  - Land: 95.80 km^{2} (36.99 sq mi)

Population (2021)
  - Total: 835
  - Density: 8.7/km^{2} (23/sq mi)
  - Pop 2016-2021: ▼4.7%
  - Dwellings: 478
- Time zone: UTC−5 (EST)
  - Summer (DST): UTC−4 (EDT)
- Postal code(s): G0K 1L0
- Area codes: 418 and 581
- Highways: R-298
- Website: www.saintdonat.ca

Saint-Donat (French pronunciation: [sɛ̃ dɔna]) is a parish municipality in La Mitis Regional County Municipality in the Bas-Saint-Laurent region of Quebec, Canada. Its population in the Canada 2021 Census was 835.

== History ==
Saint-Donat was originally a sector of Sainte-Luce. Saint-Donat split from Sainte-Luce in 1869 to became the parish municipality of Saint-Donat. The original economic vocation of Saint-Donat was based almost entirely on forestry, as evidenced by the many remnants of the sawmills that once dotted the area. Later, like many other towns in the region, agriculture became the main activity.

Writer Rejean Pigeon is from the area and one of his novel is set in Saint-Donat.

== Demographics ==
In the 2021 Census of Population conducted by Statistics Canada, Saint-Donat had a population of 835 living in 400 of its 478 total private dwellings, a change of −4.7% from its 2016 population of 876. With a land area of 95.8 km^{2} (37.0 sq mi), it had a population density of 8.7/km^{2} (22.6/sq mi) in 2021.

=== Population ===
Population trend:

| Census | Population | Change (%) |
|---|---|---|
| 2021 | 835 | ▼4.7% |
| 2016 | 876 | ▼1.6% |
| 2011 | 890 | ▼0.2% |
| 2006 | 892 | ▲5.3% |
| 2001 | 847 | ▲4.3% |
| 1996 | 812 | ▲6.8% |
| 1991 | 760 | ▼8.8% |
| 1986 | 833 | ▼1% |
| 1981 | 841 | ▲10.5% |
| 1976 | 761 | ▼12% |
| 1971 | 865 | ▼12.3% |
| 1966 | 986 | ▼12.1% |
| 1961 | 1,122 | ▼5.9% |
| 1956 | 1,192 | ▲6.2% |
| 1951 | 1,122 | ▼12.5% |
| 1941 | 1,283 | ▼4.8% |
| 1931 | 1,347 | ▲13.3% |
| 1921 | 1,189 | ▲29% |
| 1911 | 922 | ▲15% |
| 1901 | 802 | ▲5.5% |
| 1891 | 760 | ▼16.8% |
| 1881 | 914 | ▲11.6% |
| 1871 | 819 | N/A |

=== Language ===
Mother tongue language (2021)

| Language | Population | Pct (%) |
|---|---|---|
| French only | 825 | 98.8% |
| English only | 5 | 0.6% |
| Both English and French | 10 | 1.2% |
| Other languages | 0 | 0.0% |

== See also ==
- List of parish municipalities in Quebec
