= Saint-Gabriel-de-Rimouski =

- Municipality
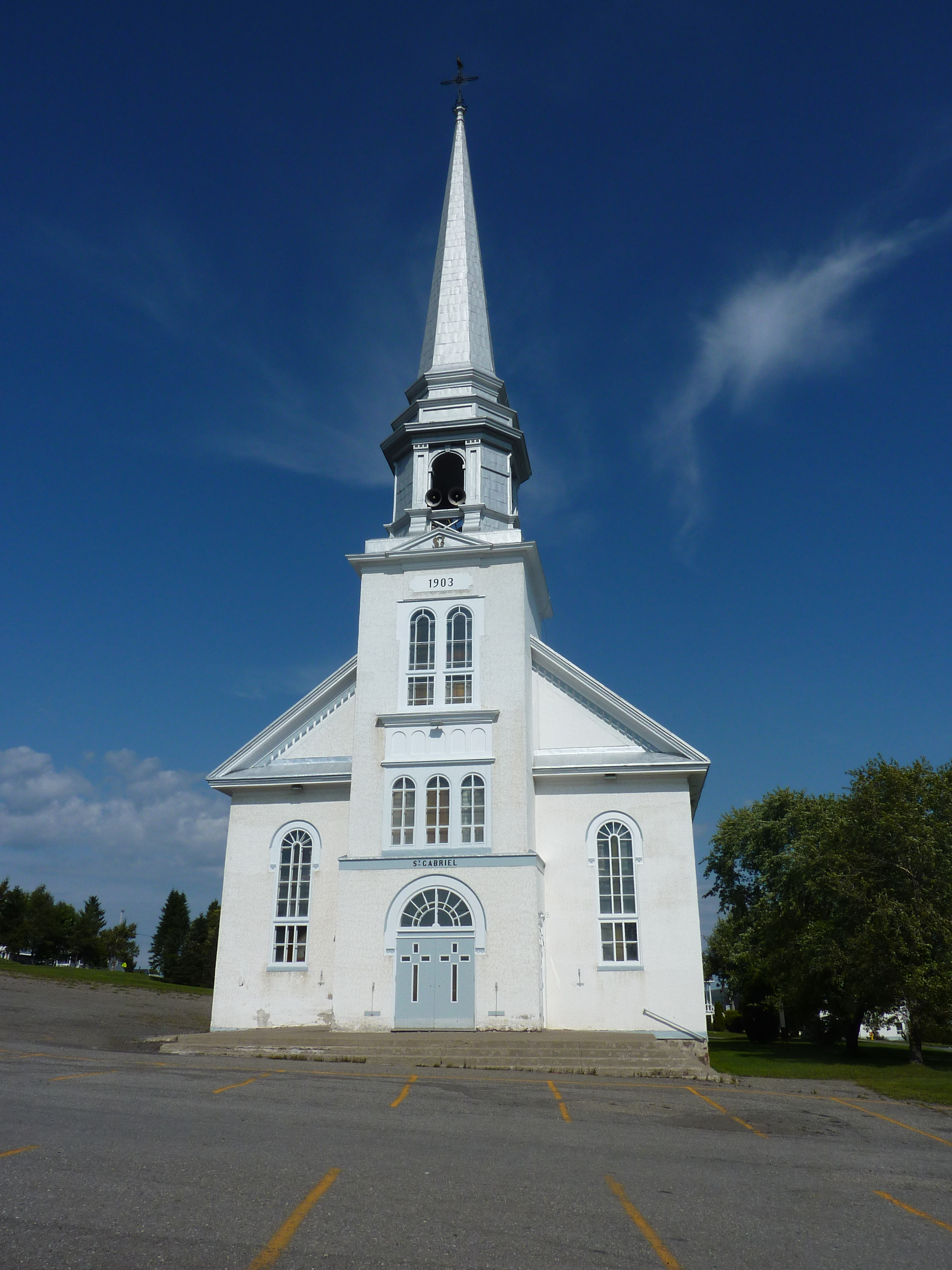
- Church of Saint-Gabriel-de-Rimouski

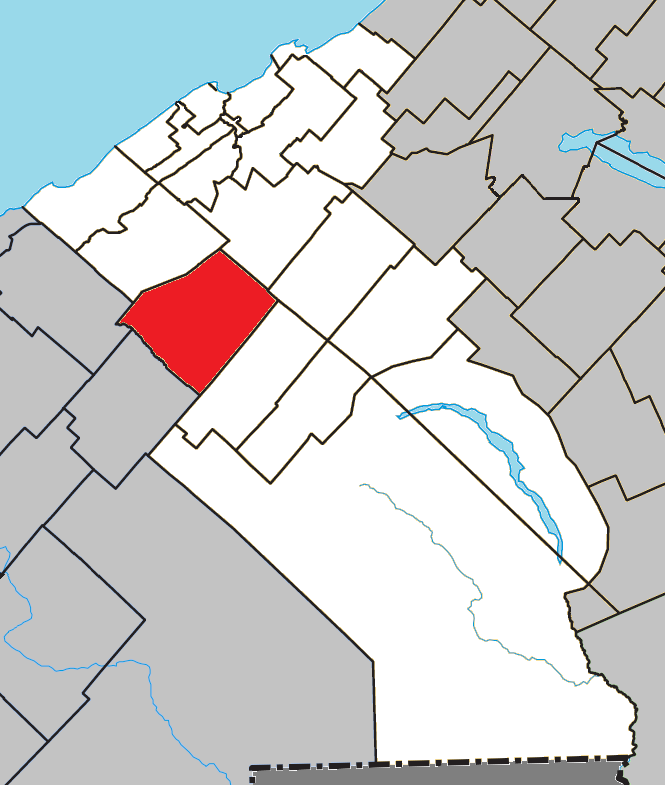
- Location within La Mitis RCM

- Location in eastern Quebec
- Coordinates: 48.42°N 68.17°W
- Country: Canada
- Province: Quebec
- Region: Bas-Saint-Laurent
- RCM: La Mitis
- Constituted: January 7, 1989

Government
  - Mayor: Étienne Lévesque
  - Federal riding: Rimouski-Neigette—Mitis—Matapédia—Les Basques
  - Prov. riding: Matane-Matapédia-Mitis

Area
  - Total: 128.00 km^{2} (49.42 sq mi)
  - Land: 126.98 km^{2} (49.03 sq mi)

Population (2021)
  - Total: 1,177
  - Density: 9.3/km^{2} (24/sq mi)
  - Pop 2016-2021: ▲0.9%
  - Dwellings: 581
- Time zone: UTC−5 (EST)
  - Summer (DST): UTC−4 (EDT)
- Postal code(s): G0K 1M0
- Area codes: 418 and 581
- Highways: R-234; R-298
- Website: www.municipalite. saint-gabriel-de-rimouski.qc.ca

Saint-Gabriel-de-Rimouski (French pronunciation: [sɛ̃ ɡabʁijɛl də ʁimuski]) is a municipality in La Mitis Regional County Municipality in the Bas-Saint-Laurent region of Quebec, Canada. Prior to January 31, 1998 it was known simply as Saint-Gabriel. The name pays homage to Father Gabriel Nadeau (1808-1869), first priest of the parish and parish priest of Sainte-Luce (1842-1869).

== Demographics ==
In the 2021 Census of Population conducted by Statistics Canada, Saint-Gabriel-de-Rimouski had a population of 1,177 living in 524 of its 581 total private dwellings, a change of 0.9% from its 2016 population of 1,167. With a land area of 126.98 km^{2} (49.03 sq mi), it had a population density of 9.3/km^{2} (24.0/sq mi) in 2021.

== See also ==
- List of municipalities in Quebec
