= Saint-Narcisse-de-Rimouski =

- Parish municipality
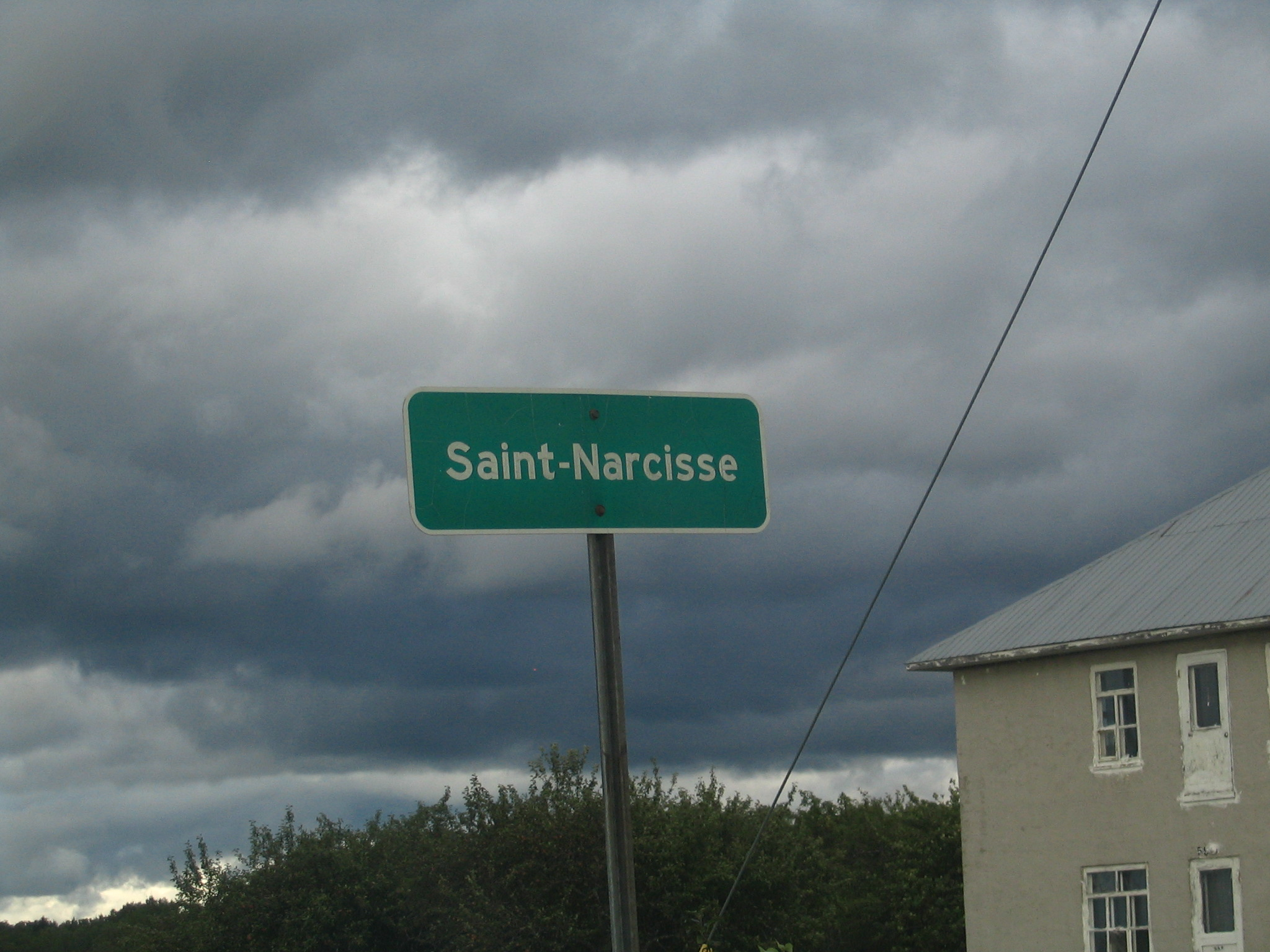
- Parish limit sign of Saint-Narcisse-de-Rimouski.

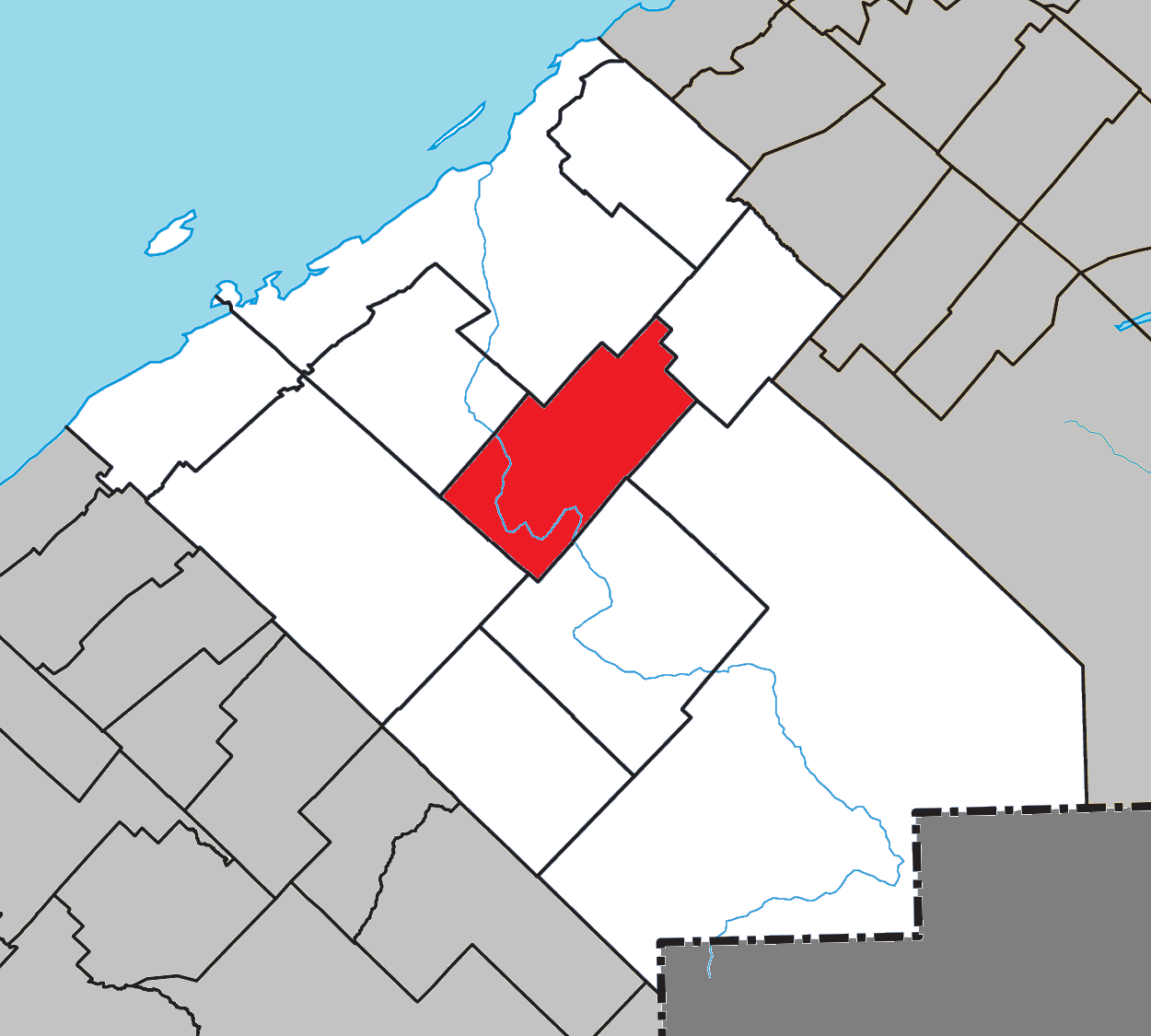
- Location within Rimouski-Neigette RCM

- Location in eastern Quebec
- Coordinates: 48.28°N 68.43°W
- Country: Canada
- Province: Quebec
- Region: Bas-Saint-Laurent
- RCM: Rimouski-Neigette
- Constituted: February 13, 1922

Government
  - Mayor: Gervais Soucy
  - Federal riding: Rimouski-Neigette—Mitis—Matapédia—Les Basques
  - Prov. riding: Rimouski

Area
  - Total: 169.40 km^{2} (65.41 sq mi)
  - Land: 162.40 km^{2} (62.70 sq mi)

Population (2021)
  - Total: 1,084
  - Density: 6.7/km^{2} (17/sq mi)
  - Pop 2016-2021: ▲12.8%
  - Dwellings: 667
- Time zone: UTC−5 (EST)
  - Summer (DST): UTC−4 (EDT)
- Postal code(s): G0K 1S0
- Area codes: 418 and 581
- Highways: R-232; R-234
- Website: www.saintnarcisse.net

Saint-Narcisse-de-Rimouski (French pronunciation: [sɛ̃ naʁsis də ʁimuski]) is a parish municipality in the Canadian province of Quebec, located in the Rimouski-Neigette Regional County Municipality. It is part of the Bas-Saint-Laurent region and the population is 1,084 as of 2021.

== Demographics ==
In the 2021 Census of Population conducted by Statistics Canada, Saint-Narcisse-de-Rimouski had a population of 1,084 living in 495 of its 667 total private dwellings, a change of 12.8% from its 2016 population of 961. With a land area of 162.4 km^{2} (62.7 sq mi), it had a population density of 6.7/km^{2} (17.3/sq mi) in 2021.

== See also ==
- Rimouski River
- List of parish municipalities in Quebec
