= Sainte-Flavie =

- Parish municipality
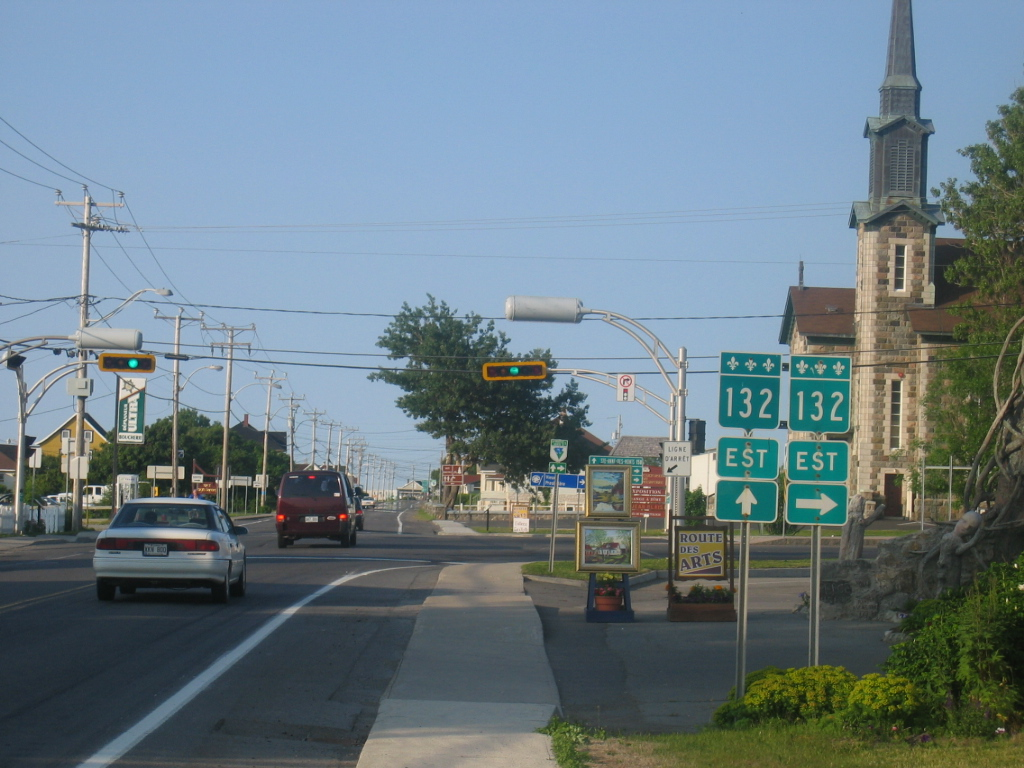
- Route 132 split in Sainte-Flavie

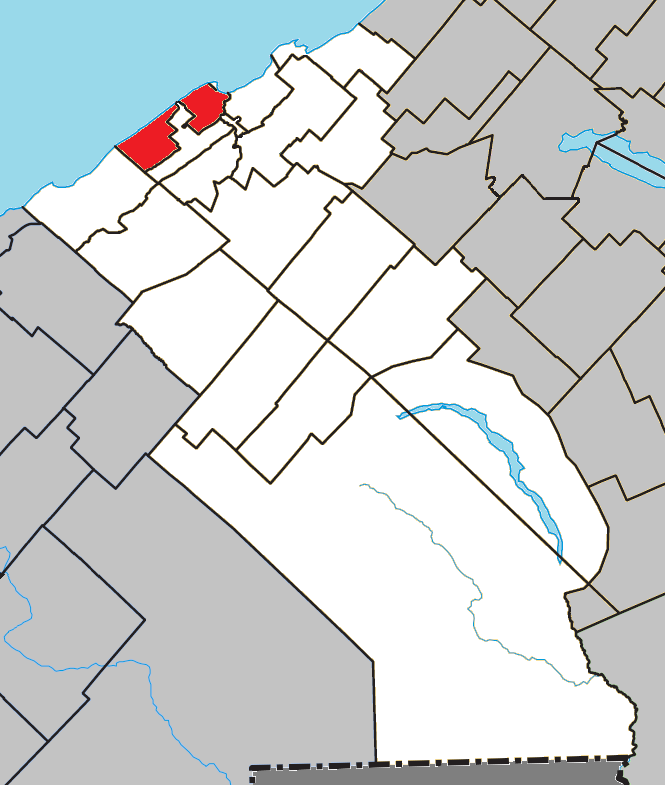
- Location within La Mitis RCM

- Location in eastern Quebec
- Coordinates: 48.6108658°N 68.2312863°W
- Country: Canada
- Province: Quebec
- Region: Bas-Saint-Laurent
- RCM: La Mitis
- Constituted: July 1, 1855
- Named for: Saint Flavia

Government
  - Mayor: Jean-François Fortin
  - Federal riding: Rimouski-Neigette—Mitis—Matapédia—Les Basques
  - Prov. riding: Matane-Matapédia-Mitis

Area
  - Total: 38.30 km^{2} (14.79 sq mi)
  - Land: 38.23 km^{2} (14.76 sq mi)

Population (2021)
  - Total: 904
  - Density: 23.6/km^{2} (61/sq mi)
  - Pop 2016-2021: ▲2.3%
  - Dwellings: 531
- Demonym(s): Flavien, Flavienne
- Time zone: UTC−5 (EST)
  - Summer (DST): UTC−4 (EDT)
- Postal code(s): G0J 2L0
- Area codes: 418 and 581
- Highways: R-132
- Website: www.sainte-flavie.net

Sainte-Flavie (French pronunciation: [sɛ̃t flavi]) is a parish municipality in the La Mitis Regional County Municipality of Quebec, Canada, located on the south shore of the Saint Lawrence River, about 3 km (2 mi) northwest of Mont-Joli. It is named after Flavia, a martyred saint.

Sainte-Flavie is the westernmost point of Route 132's loop around the Gaspé Peninsula at which the road intersects with itself.

== History ==
Formerly, the territory of the municipality covered a much larger area, extending deeper inland until what is the current municipality of Sainte-Jeanne-d'Arc-de-la-Mitis. In 1696, Louis de Buade de Frontenac, governor of New France, ceded the territory as a seigneury to Louis Lepage and Gabriel Thibierge. The territory was given the name of Lepage.

However, the demographic development of the seigneury was long and progressive. Seigneur Lepage and Thibierge seemed to have little interest in clearing the land. They mostly contented themselves with hunting and fishing. The seigneury passed into the hands of the wealthy merchant Joseph Drapeau in 1790 and on his death, it was passed on to his wife, Marie-Geneviève Noël and his three daughters; Luce-Gertrude, Angélique-Flavie and Louise-Angèle.

Taking advantage of the impetus to create parishes from the diocese of Quebec, the inhabitants of Lepage claimed their parish and ended up obtaining it in 1829. But that was only the beginning of the hard work needed to establish the community. The inhabitants had to travel for miles to attend Sunday mass and to grind their grain at the mill on the Loutres River in Lessard. Finally, in the summer of 1850, the first wooden church was built. Then in 1853, to the delight of the parish priest, the presbytery was built as we can see it today.

The Municipality of Sainte-Flavie was finally created in 1855. Sainte-Flavie was named in honor of the co-seigneuress Flavie Drapeau and in memory of Flavia Domitilla, a Roman martyr of the 1st century. At three different moments, the municipality lost important section of its territory. First in 1869 for the creation of Sainte-Angèle-de-Mérici, then in 1873 when Saint-Joseph-de-Lepage split away and finally in 1880 when Mont-Joli also split away from Sainte-Flavie to become its own village.

In 1890, the wooden church was sold to the parish of Notre-Dame-de-Lourdes in Mont-Joli. The inhabitants of Sainte-Flavie wanted a stone church and after having made the request to the bishop and after having drawn up the plans and specifications, the construction begun. However, the first celebration was to take place only 11 years after the start of the work, which ended in 1884. Finally, in 1948, a fire ravaged the religious building to the great misfortune of the population. Immediately, the construction of a third church, the one that currently exists, began.

In 1932, a wharf was built around which commercial and sport fishing coexisted for a time. Nowadays, the latter is used only for fun. Until recently, the inhabitants of Sainte-Flavie lived mainly from agriculture, fishing and forestry. Over time, the Flavian economy has focused mainly on the service industry and tourism.

In the 2010s, coastal erosion became an issue for the municipality. Since the tide of December 6, 2010, some residences in coastal locations have been moved inland.

== Demographics ==
In the 2021 Census of Population conducted by Statistics Canada, Sainte-Flavie had a population of 904 living in 418 of its 531 total private dwellings, a change of 2.3% from its 2016 population of 884. With a land area of 38.23 km^{2} (14.76 sq mi), it had a population density of 23.6/km^{2} (61.2/sq mi) in 2021.

Canada census – Sainte-Flavie community profile

	2021	2016	2011
Population	904 (+2.3% from 2016)	884 (-3.8% from 2011)	919 (-2.5% from 2006)
Land area	38.23 km^{2} (14.76 sq mi)	38.52 km^{2} (14.87 sq mi)	37.82 km^{2} (14.60 sq mi)
Population density	23.6/km^{2} (61/sq mi)	22.9/km^{2} (59/sq mi)	24.3/km^{2} (63/sq mi)
Median age	54.0 (M: 54.0, F: 54.0)	51.8 (M: 52.1, F: 51.4)	47.8 (M: 48.2, F: 47.3)
Private dwellings	531 (total)	497 (total)	505 (total)
Median household income	$62,000	$54,688	$54,096

References: 2021 2016 2011

Historical census populations – Sainte-Flavie, Quebec

Year	Pop.	±%
1861	2,203	—
1871	2,221	+0.8%
1881	1,258	−43.4%
1891	1,296	+3.0%
1901	1,147	−11.5%
1911	669	−41.7%
1921	707	+5.7%
1931	795	+12.4%

Year	Pop.	±%
1941	809	+1.8%
1951	877	+8.4%
1956	1,125	+28.3%
1961	811	−27.9%
1966	767	−5.4%
1971	745	−2.9%
1976	777	+4.3%
1981	915	+17.8%

Year	Pop.	±%
1986	972	+6.2%
1991	869	−10.6%
1996	920	+5.9%
2001	919	−0.1%
2006	943	+2.6%
2011	919	−2.5%
2016	884	−3.8%
2021	904	+2.3%

Source: Statistics Canada

Mother tongue (2021):

- English as first language: 1.1%
- French as first language: 97.2%
- English and French as first language: 0.0%
- Other as first language: 1.1%

== Government ==
Federally, Sainte-Flavie is part of the federal riding of Rimouski-Neigette—Mitis—Matapédia—Les Basques (named Rimouski—La Matapédia between 2025 to 2026), as the original riding of Avignon—La Mitis—Matane—Matapédia was abolished after the 2022 Canadian federal electoral redistribution. In the 2025 Canadian federal election, the incumbent Maxime Blanchette-Joncas of the Bloc Québécois was elected to represent the population Sainte-Flavie in the House of Commons of Canada. Provincially, Sainte-Flavie is part of the Matane-Matapédia-Mitis electoral district and is represented by Pascal Bérubé of the Parti Québécois since 2007.

== See also ==
- List of parish municipalities in Quebec
