= Quebec Route 234 =

Highway in Quebec, Canada

Route 234

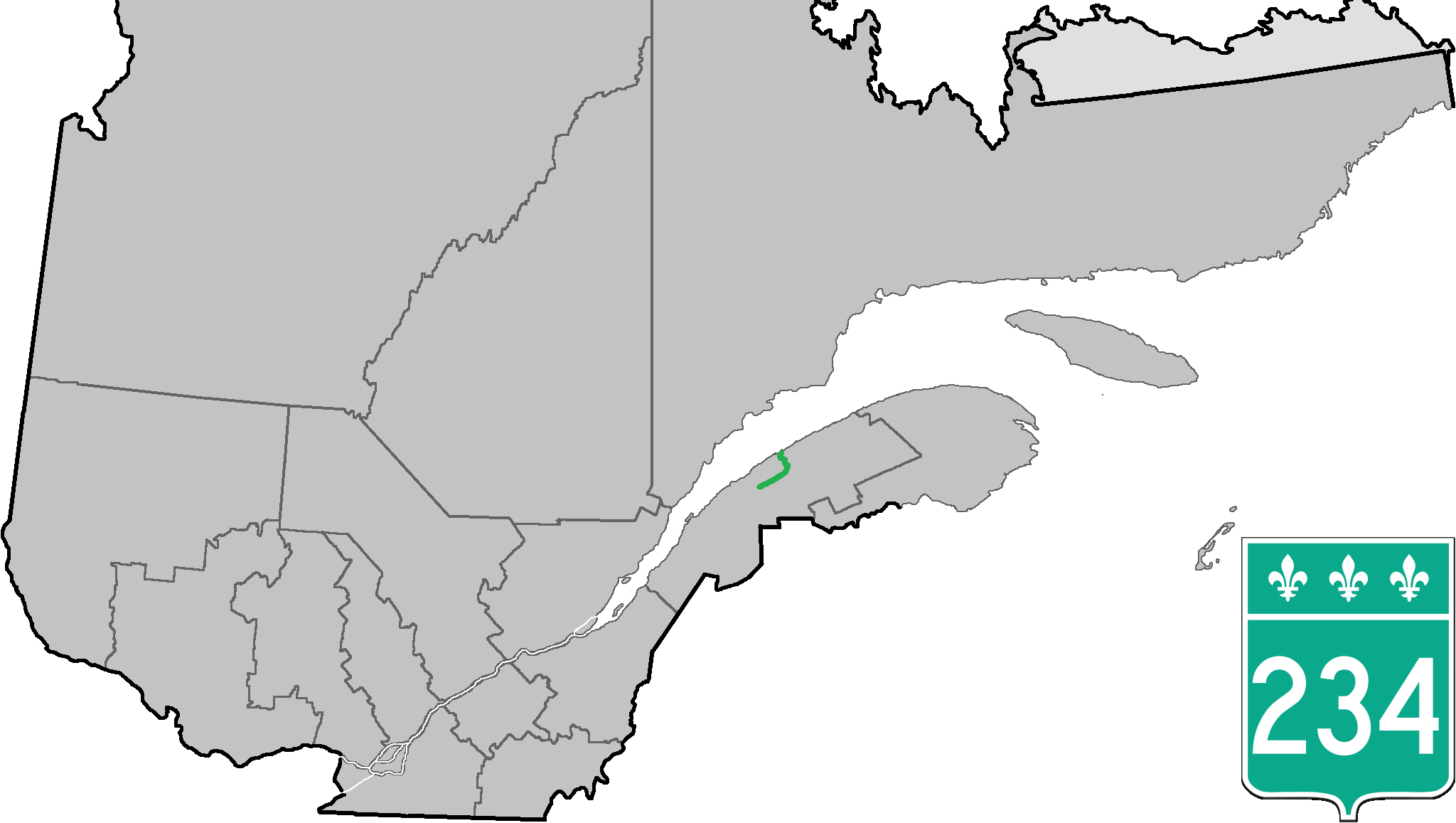

Route information
- Maintained by Transports Québec
- Length: 50.2 km (31.2 mi)

Major junctions
- West end: R-232 in Saint-Narcisse-de-Rimouski
- R-298 in Saint-Gabriel-de-Rimouski; R-132 in Sainte-Angele-de-Merici
- East end: R-132 in Grand-Métis

Location
- Country: Canada
- Province: Quebec

Highway system
- Quebec provincial highways; Autoroutes; List; Former
← R-233	→ R-235

Route 234 is a provincial highway located in the Bas-Saint-Laurent region in the southeastern part of the province of Quebec. The highway runs from the junction of Route 232 in Saint-Narcisse-de-Rimouski and ends at the junction of Route 132 near Grand-Métis. The route runs concurrently with Highway 298 through Saint-Gabriel-de-Rimouski and then with Highway 132 near Sainte-Angele-de-Merici near the northwestern part of the 132 loop around the Gaspé Peninsula.

== Municipalities along Route 234 ==
- Saint-Narcisse-de-Rimouski
- Saint-Marcellin
- Saint-Gabriel-de-Rimouski
- Sainte-Angèle-de-Mérici
- Grand-Métis
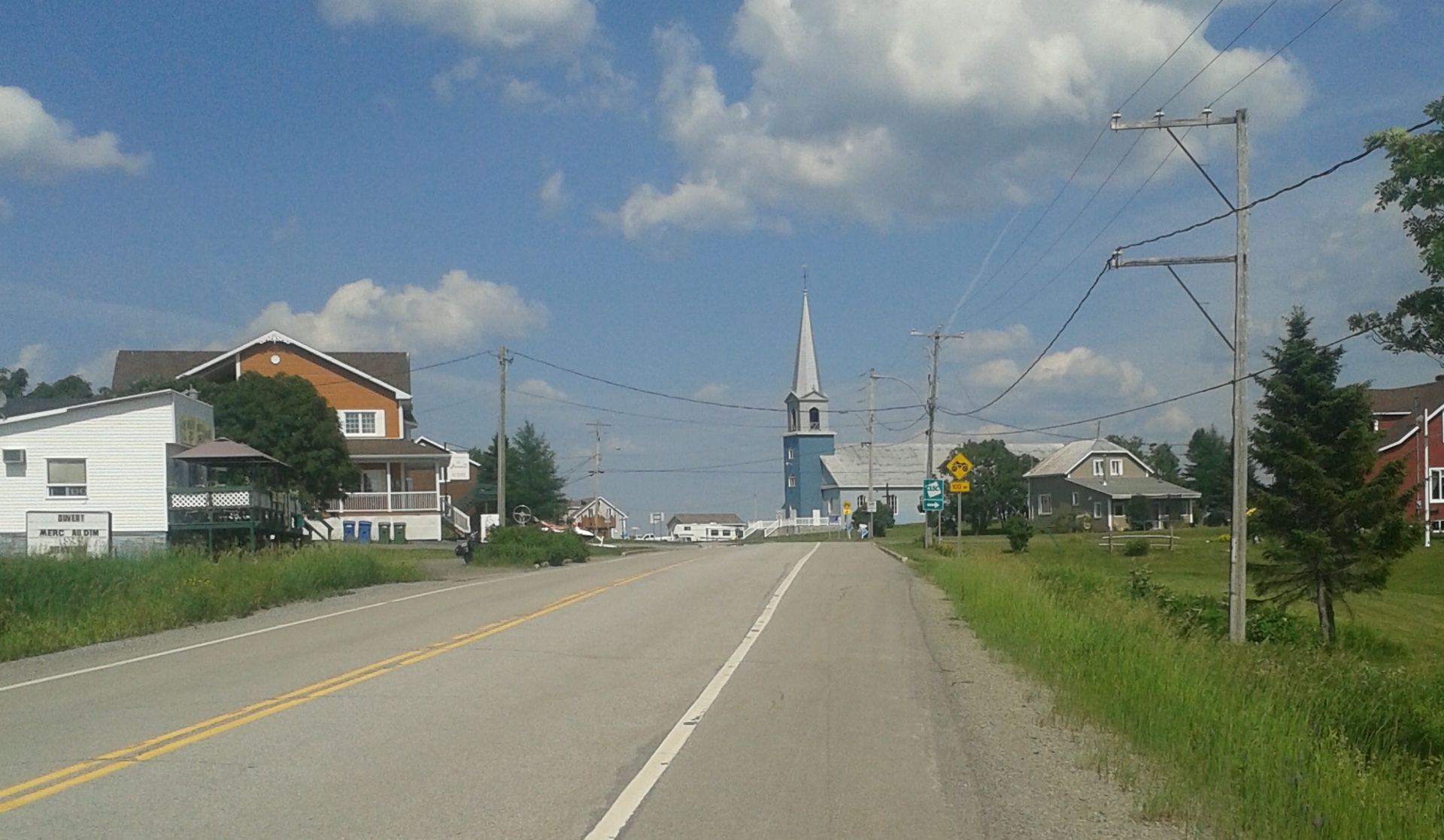
Route 234 entering Saint-Marcellin.

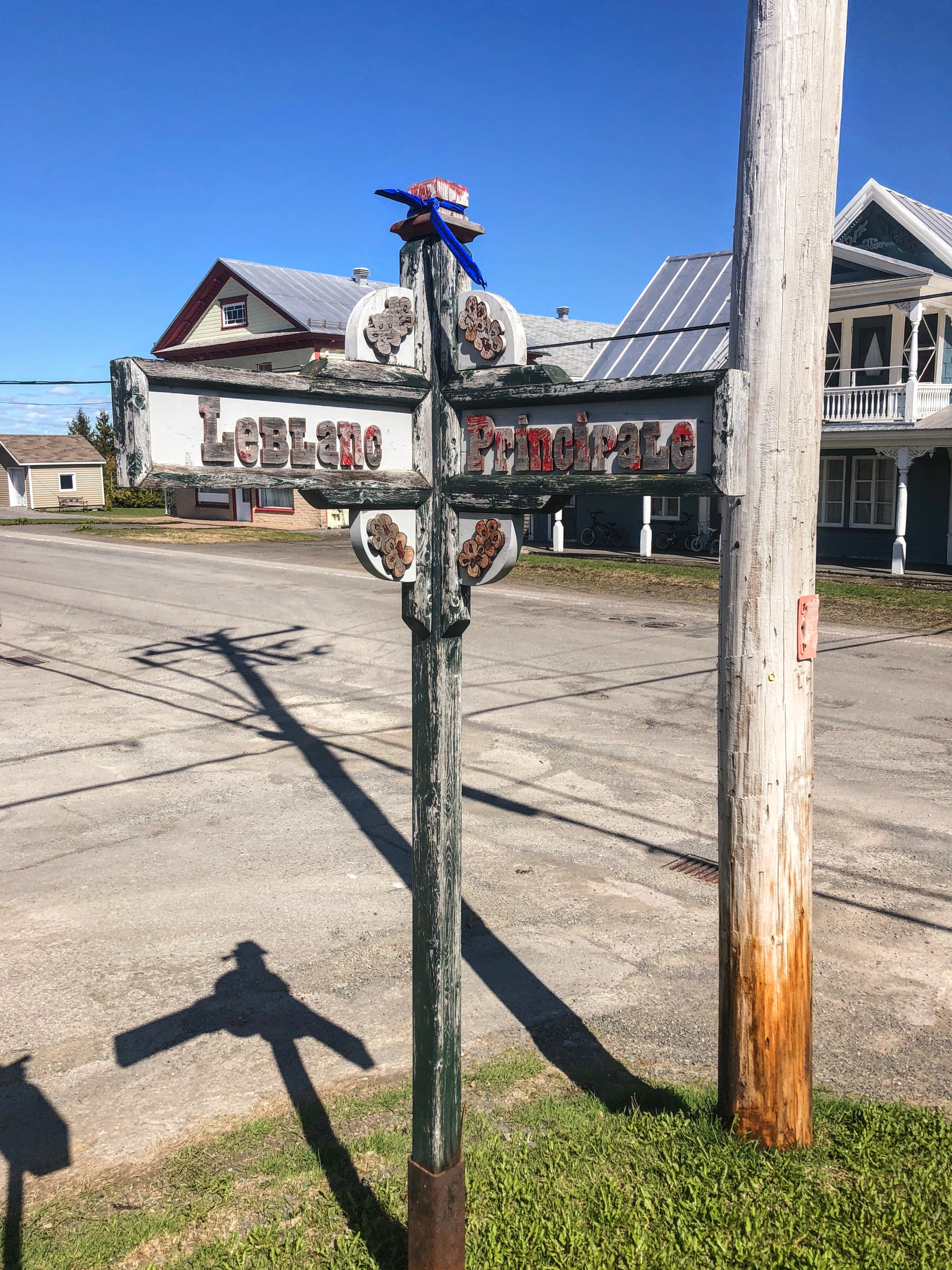
Wooden street blades on Route 234 in Saint-Gabriel.

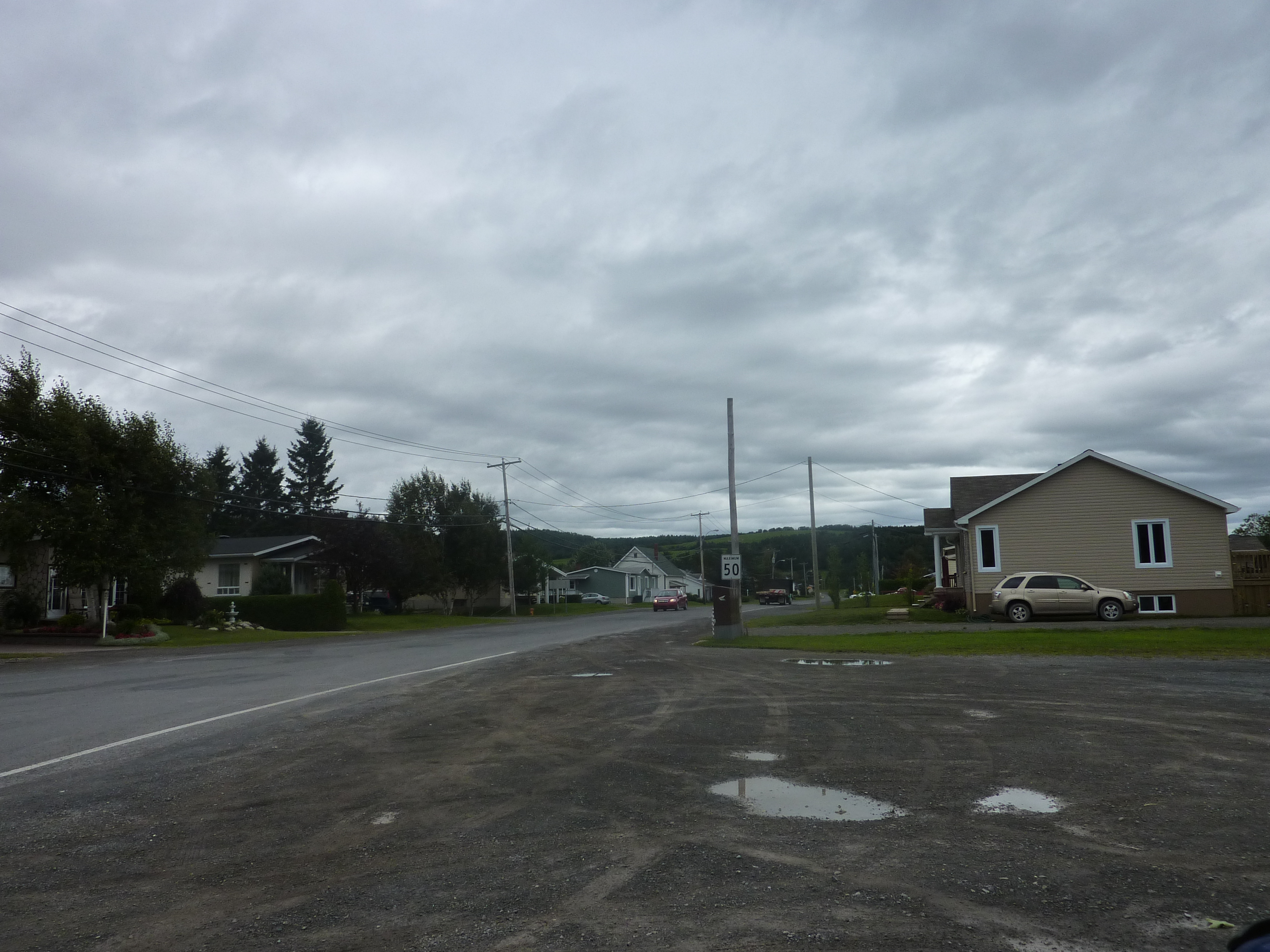
Route 234 in Sainte-Angèle-de-Mérici.

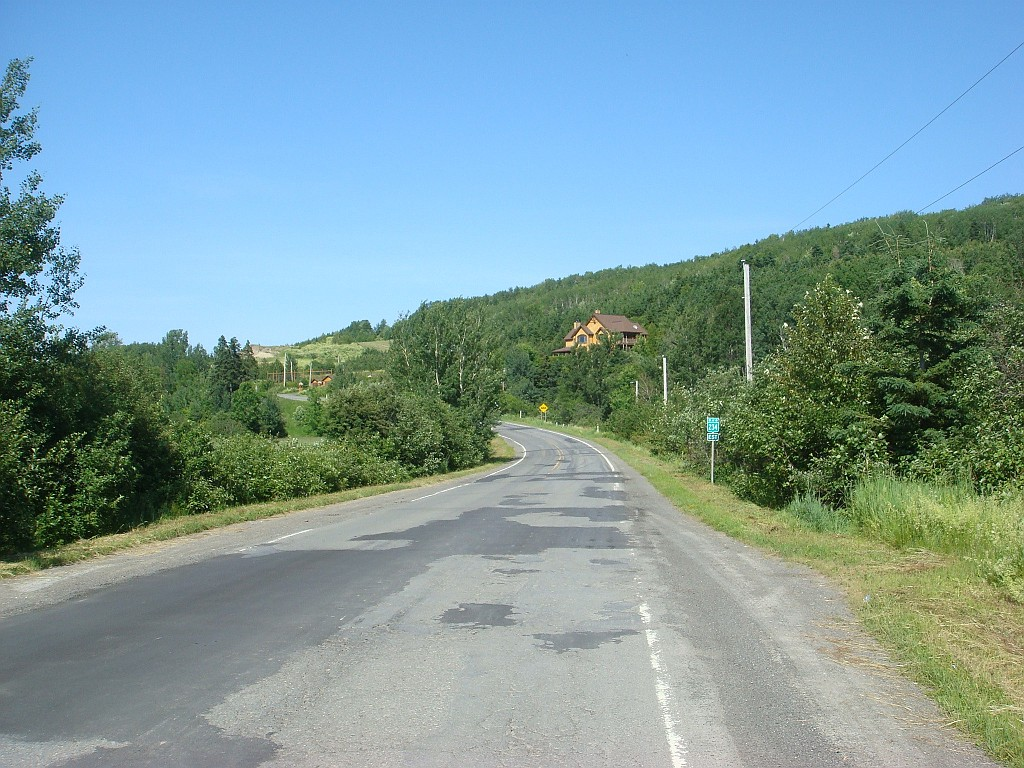
Route 234 seen in eastbound direction near Price, Quebec.

== See also ==
- List of Quebec provincial highways
