= Quebec Route 298 =

Highway in Quebec, Canada

Route 298

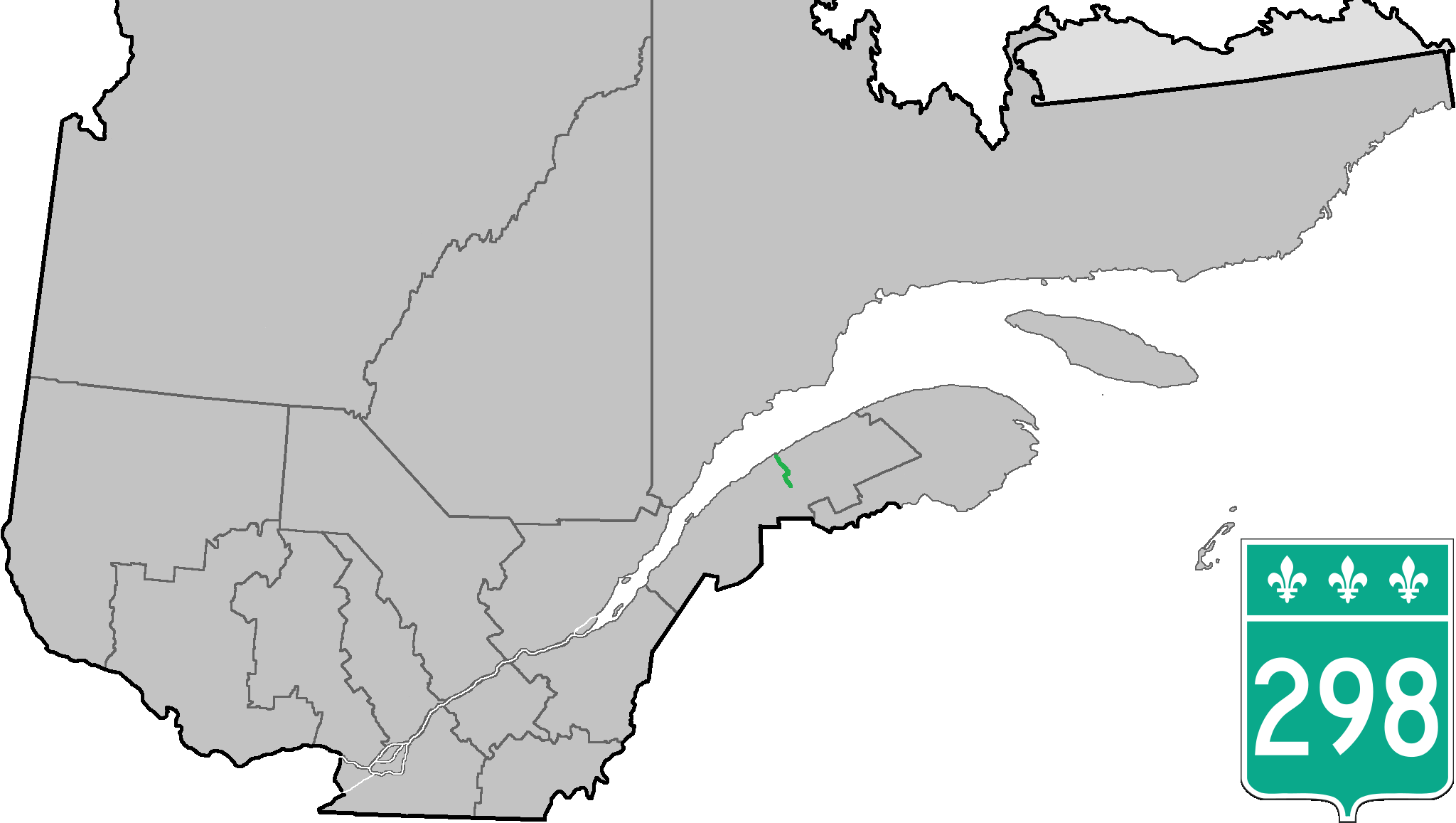

Route information
- Length: 40 km (25 mi)

Major junctions
- West end: R-132 in Sainte-Luce
- A-20 in Sainte-Luce; R-234 in Saint-Gabriel-de-Rimouski
- East end: Rue Pineault in Saint-Charles-Garnier

Location
- Country: Canada
- Province: Quebec
- Major cities: Sainte-Luce

Highway system
- Quebec provincial highways; Autoroutes; List; Former
← R-297	→ R-299

Route 298 is 40 km two-lane north/south highway in Quebec, Canada, which starts in Sainte-Luce at the junction of Route 132 and ends in Saint-Charles-Garnier. Provincial highways with even numbers usually follow the Saint Lawrence River in a somewhat east/west direction, but Route 298 is a north/south highway in almost all of its length.

== Municipalities along Route 298 ==
- Sainte-Luce
- Saint-Donat
- Saint-Gabriel-de-Rimouski
- Les Hauteurs
- Saint-Charles-Garnier
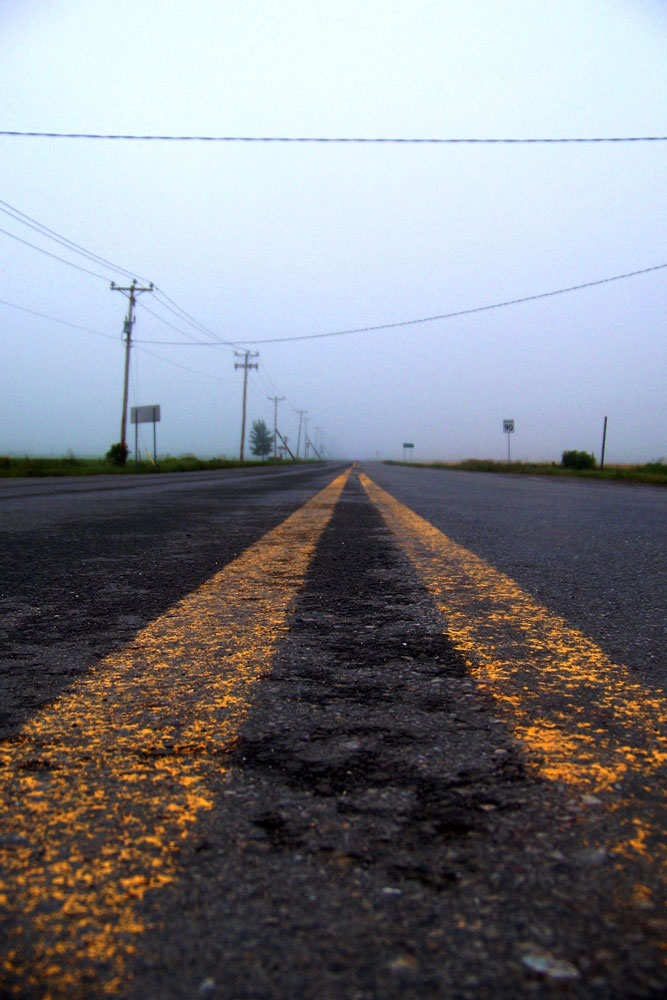
Route 298 in Luceville.

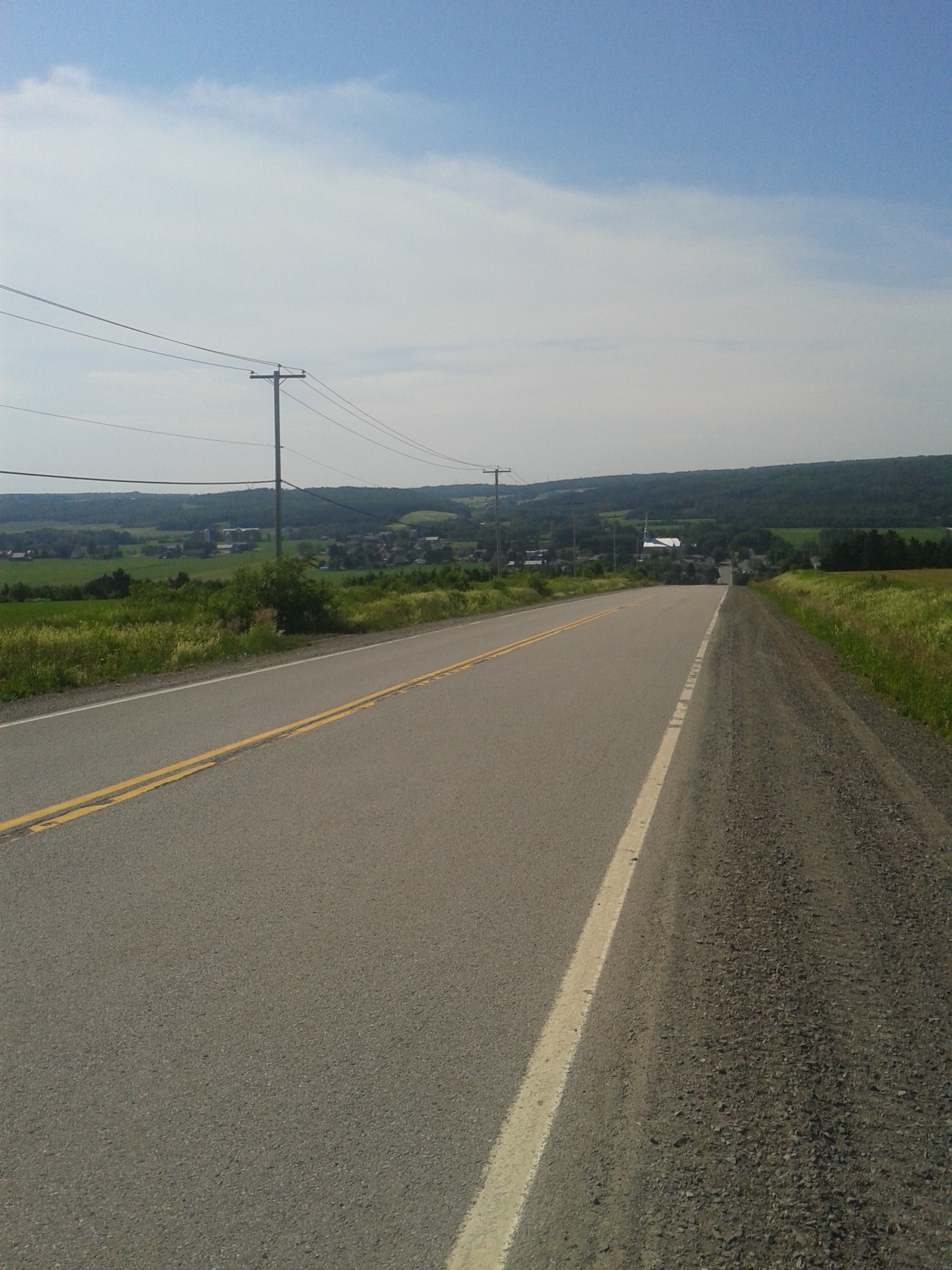
View towards Saint-Donat-de-Rimouski.

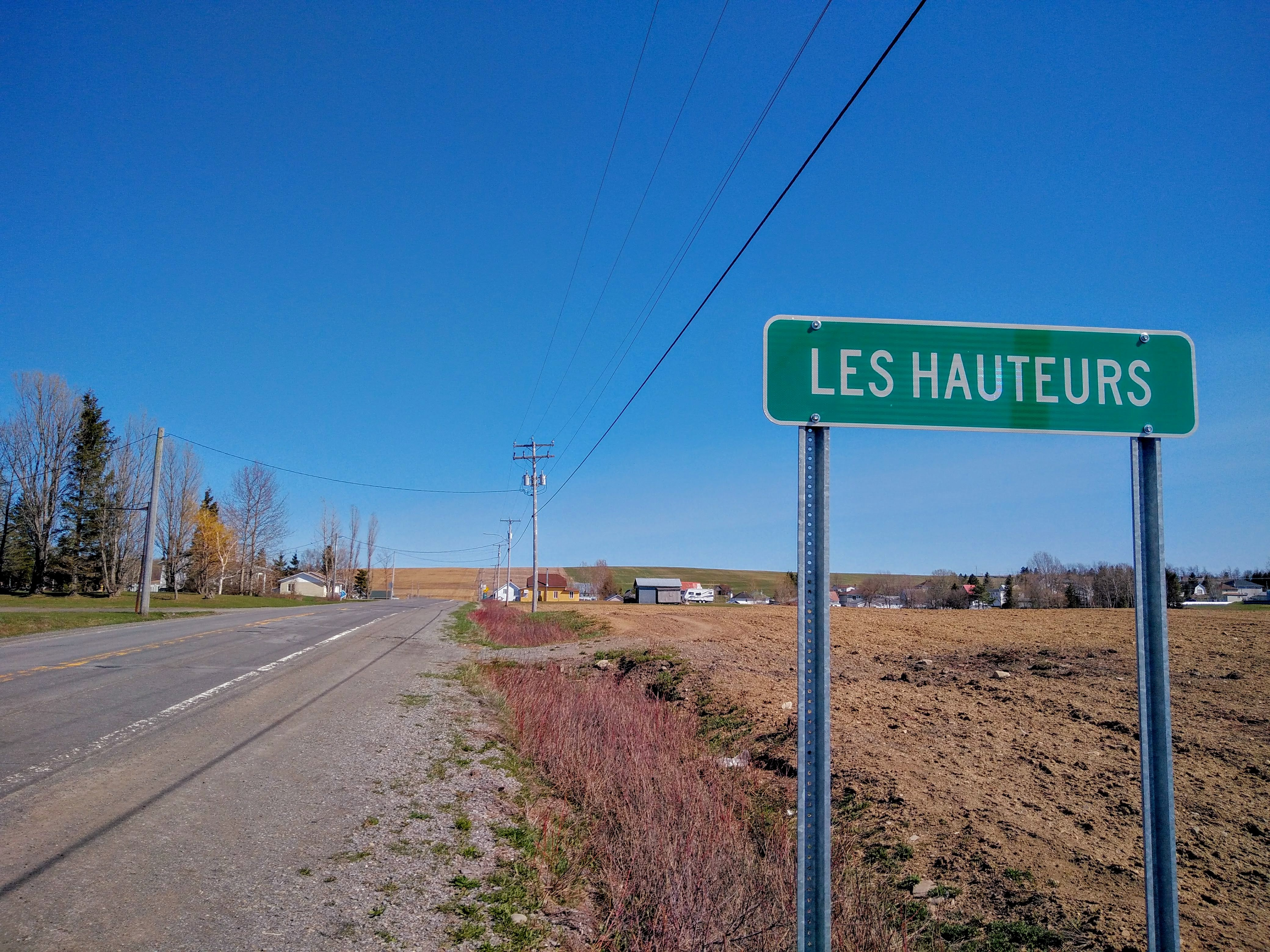
Entering Les Hauteurs-de-Rimouski on Route 298.

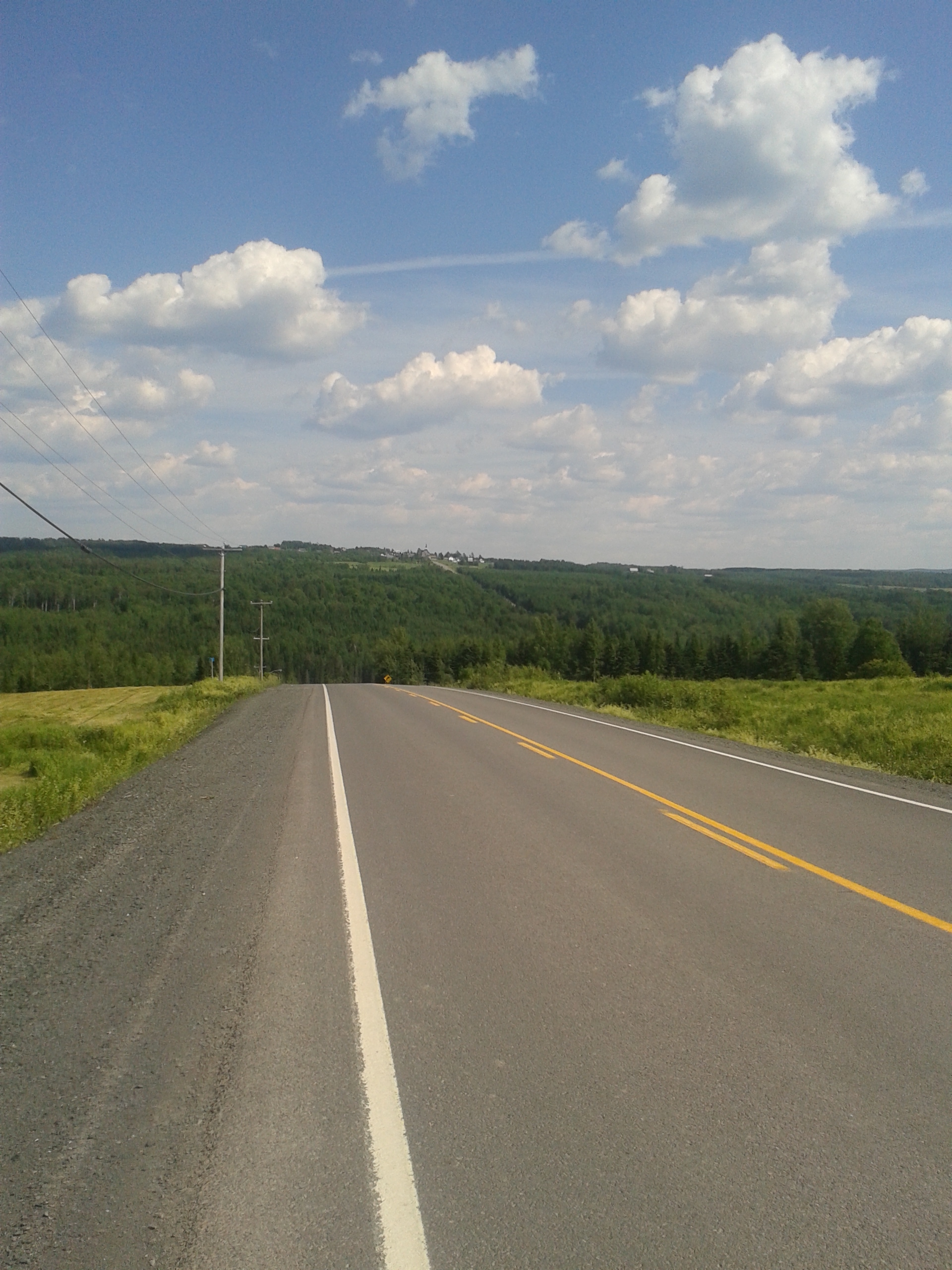
Route 298 climbs hills near Saint-Charles-Garnier.

== See also ==
- List of Quebec provincial highways
