= Price, Quebec =

Price
- Village municipality
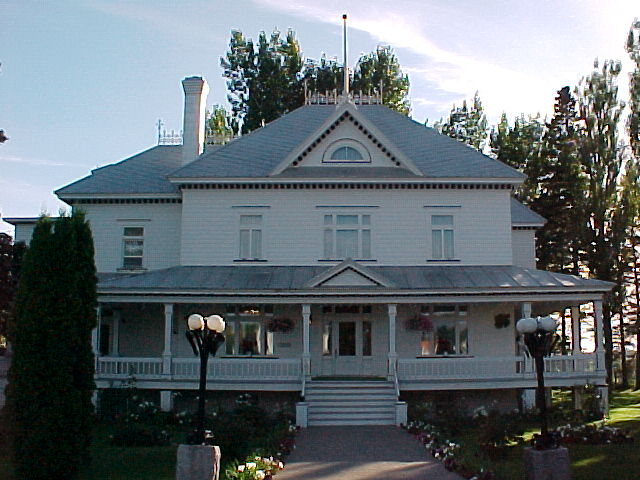
- Price presbytery

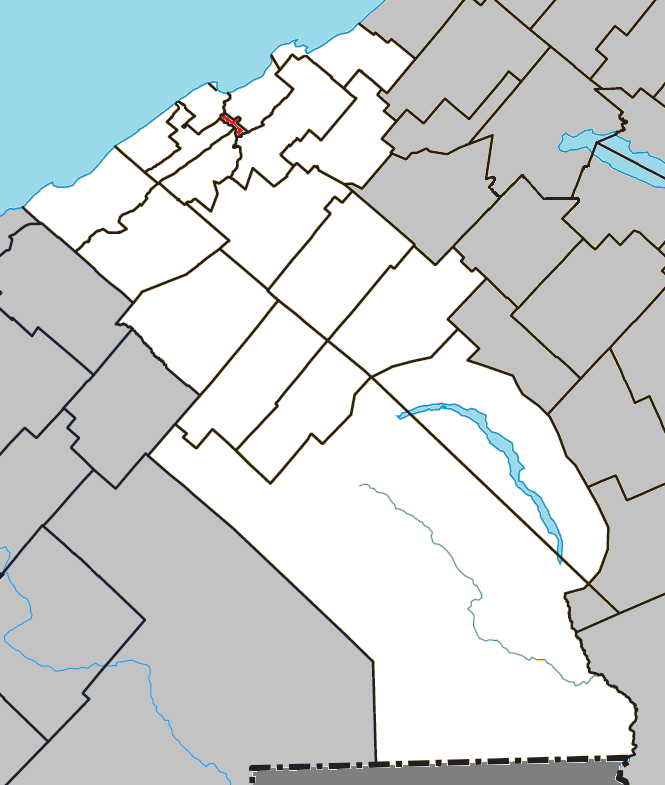
- Location within La Mitis RCM

- Location in eastern Quebec
- Coordinates: 48.6°N 68.1167°W
- Country: Canada
- Province: Quebec
- Region: Bas-Saint-Laurent
- RCM: La Mitis
- Constituted: March 3, 1926
- Named for: William Evan Price

Government
  - Mayor: Bruno Paradis
  - Federal riding: Rimouski-Neigette—Mitis—Matapédia—Les Basques
  - Prov. riding: Matane-Matapédia-Mitis

Area
  - Total: 2.50 km^{2} (0.97 sq mi)
  - Land: 2.51 km^{2} (0.97 sq mi)
- There is an apparent contradiction between two authoritative sources

Population (2021)
  - Total: 1,729
  - Density: 688.8/km^{2} (1,784/sq mi)
  - Pop 2016-2021: ▼1.7%
  - Dwellings: 794
- Time zone: UTC−5 (EST)
  - Summer (DST): UTC−4 (EDT)
- Postal code(s): G0J 1Z0
- Area codes: 418 and 581
- Highways: R-234
- Website: www.municipaliteprice.com

Price (French pronunciation: [pʁajs]) is a village municipality in La Mitis Regional County Municipality in the Bas-Saint-Laurent region of Quebec, Canada. Its population in the Canada 2021 Census was 1,729.

The city of Mont-Joli provides the services necessary for the whole region.

== History ==
It was the arrival of the Price Brothers and Company (of William Evan Price) that the village of Price was founded at the end of the 19th century. It was a suburb of Saint-Octave-de-Métis, which constituted a community of workers, who were employed at the saw mill.

The parish of (Saint-Rémi-de-Métis) was detached from Saint-Octave-de-Métis in 1909. In 1916, the parish was erected. Ten years later, in 1926, the municipality was founded under the name Priceville. The name was modified in 1945 to avoid confusion with the village of Princeville in the Bois-Francs region of Quebec.

A hydroelectric dam (Mitis I) was the first in the Bas-Saint-Laurent region after its construction in 1923, providing electricity to the Gaspésie region.

== Demographics ==
In the 2021 Census of Population conducted by Statistics Canada, Price had a population of 1,729 living in 760 of its 794 total private dwellings, a change of −1.7% from its 2016 population of 1,759. With a land area of 2.51 km^{2} (0.97 sq mi), it had a population density of 688.8/km^{2} (1,784.1/sq mi) in 2021.

Population trend:

Census	Population	Change (%)
2021	1,729	▼1.7%
2016	1,759	▲5.1%
2011	1,673	▼5.9%
2006	1,777	▼1.3%
2001	1,800	▼6.1%
1996	1,916	▼2.3%
1991	1,962	▼5.7%
1986	2,081	▼8.4%
1981	2,273	▼7.6%
1976	2,461	▼10.2%
1971	2,740	▼6.8%
1966	2,939	▼5.0%
1961	3,094	▼1.5%
1956	3,140	▲11.7%
1951	2,810	▲21.1%
1941	2,321	▲0.5%
1931	2,310	N/A

Private dwellings occupied by usual residents: 760 (total dwellings: 794)

== Economy ==
The economic vitality of the community has always centred on the pulp and paper industry. Since 1888, the saw mills have flourished on in Price. Today, two industries are still present in the area, even though there is an economic crisis in the forest industry. Bois d'oeuvre Cedrico and le Groupe Lebel, are the two compagnies involved.

== Notable people ==
- Jean Lapointe (author-composer-interpreter, actor and Canadian Senator)

== See also ==
- List of village municipalities in Quebec
