= Flavia (martyr) =

Catholic Saint

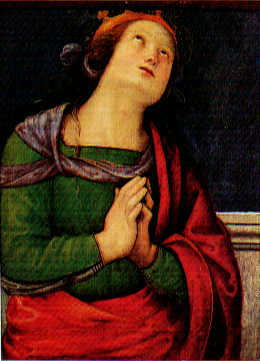
SaintFlavia.jpg

Flavia is a saint of the Roman Catholic Church. She was martyred at Messina along with her brother, the Benedictine monk Placidus, their brothers Eutychius and Victorinus, Donatus, Firmatus the deacon, Faustus, and thirty other monks. They were killed by pirates. Their feast day is October 5th. Flavia was from Paleramo Sicily. In Paleramo there is a part called Santa Flavia after her.
