= Sainte-Luce, Quebec =

Sainte-Luce
- Municipality
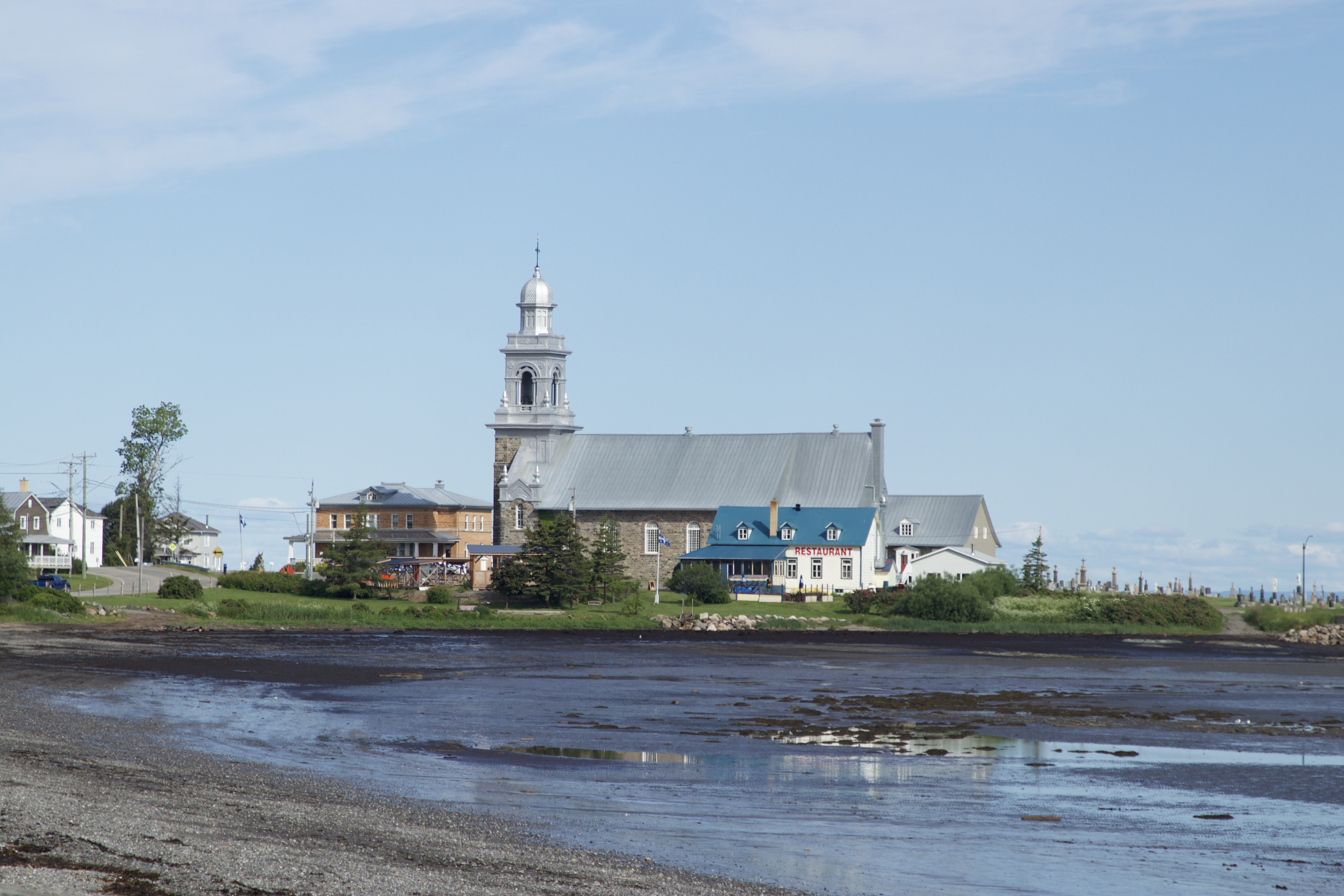
- Coast of Sainte-Luce
- Motto: Une communauté unie et épanouie
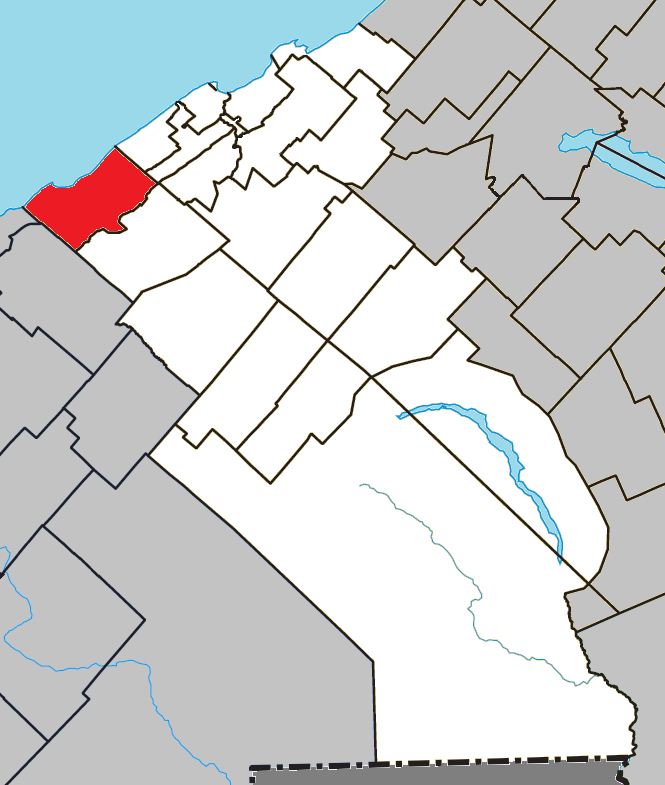
- Location within La Mitis RCM

- Location in eastern Quebec
- Coordinates: 48.55°N 68.38°W
- Country: Canada
- Province: Quebec
- Region: Bas-Saint-Laurent
- RCM: La Mitis
- Constituted: August 29, 2001

Government
  - Mayor: Yolande Hould
  - Federal riding: Rimouski-Neigette—Mitis—Matapédia—Les Basques
  - Prov. riding: Matane-Matapédia-Mitis

Area
  - Total: 71.90 km^{2} (27.76 sq mi)
  - Land: 72.59 km^{2} (28.03 sq mi)
- There is an apparent contradiction between two authoritative sources
- Elevation: 75 m (246 ft)

Population (2021)
  - Total: 2,845
  - Density: 39.2/km^{2} (102/sq mi)
  - Pop 2016-2021: ▲1.6%
  - Dwellings: 1,462
- Time zone: UTC−5 (EST)
  - Summer (DST): UTC−4 (EDT)
- Postal code(s): G0K 1P0
- Area codes: 418 and 581
- Highways A-20: R-132; R-298
- Website: www.sainteluce.ca

Sainte-Luce (French pronunciation: [sɛ̃t lys]) is a municipality in the La Mitis Regional County Municipality in the Bas-Saint-Laurent region of Quebec, Canada. The population in the Canada 2021 Census was 2,845.

== History ==
The territory was known as of 1829 as the parish of Sainte-Luce, which was established in 1835. It became a municipality in 1855, but this same municipality had been created 1845 under the name of Lessard, for the name of the seigneurie which existed during the 16th century.

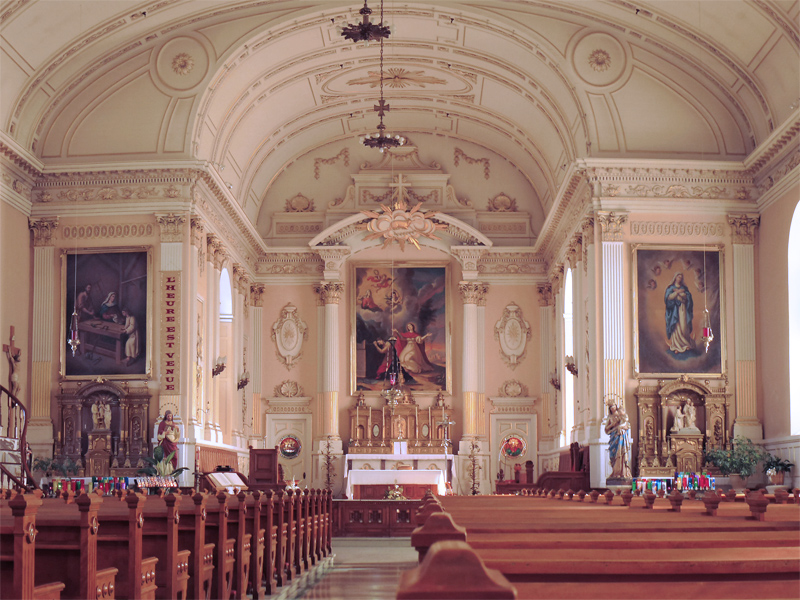
The church of Sainte-Luce

The name of Sainte-Luce was given in honour of Luce-Gertrude Drapeau (1794–1880), wife of the local notary, Thomas Casault, one the persons that established the seigneurie when the parish was canonized. The patron saint was Saint Lucy.

In 1918, the municipality of the village of Luceville was created from the territory of Sainte-Luce. Because it had one of the nicest beaches in the area, it had the nickname of Sainte-Luce-sur-Mer. The name of Luceville now identifies with the former municipality of the same name.

On August 29, 2001 the village of Luceville merged with the parish municipality of Sainte-Luce to form the municipality of Sainte-Luce–Luceville; the name was changed to simply Sainte-Luce on April 27, 2002.

== Geography ==
The many streams that flow through the municipality are part of the drainage basin of the Estuary of St. Lawrence.

=== Climate ===
Sainte-Luce has a humid continental climate (Köppen Dfb). The average annual temperature in Sainte-Luce is 3.9 °C (39.0 °F). The average annual precipitation is 931.7 mm (36.68 in) with October as the wettest month. The temperatures are highest on average in July, at around 17.9 °C (64.2 °F), and lowest in January, at around −11.3 °C (11.7 °F). The highest temperature ever recorded in Sainte-Luce was 35.9 °C (96.6 °F) on 4 July 1983; the coldest temperature ever recorded was −34.7 °C (−30.5 °F) on 3 January 2014.

Climate data for Sainte-Luce
Month	Jan	Feb	Mar	Apr	May	Jun	Jul	Aug	Sep	Oct	Nov	Dec	Year
Record high °C (°F)	13.3 (55.9)	12.4 (54.3)	23.3 (73.9)	29.1 (84.4)	33.7 (92.7)	35.1 (95.2)	35.9 (96.6)	35.1 (95.2)	32.6 (90.7)	26.7 (80.1)	23.3 (73.9)	16.7 (62.1)	35.9 (96.6)
Mean daily maximum °C (°F)	−7.2 (19.0)	−6.2 (20.8)	−0.9 (30.4)	6.0 (42.8)	14.0 (57.2)	19.8 (67.6)	22.9 (73.2)	22.1 (71.8)	17.3 (63.1)	9.7 (49.5)	3.5 (38.3)	−2.9 (26.8)	8.2 (46.8)
Daily mean °C (°F)	−11.3 (11.7)	−10.3 (13.5)	−4.9 (23.2)	2.0 (35.6)	9.0 (48.2)	14.6 (58.3)	17.9 (64.2)	17.1 (62.8)	12.7 (54.9)	6.1 (43.0)	0.4 (32.7)	−6.2 (20.8)	3.9 (39.0)
Mean daily minimum °C (°F)	−15.4 (4.3)	−14.4 (6.1)	−8.9 (16.0)	−1.9 (28.6)	3.9 (39.0)	9.2 (48.6)	12.9 (55.2)	12.1 (53.8)	8.0 (46.4)	2.5 (36.5)	−2.8 (27.0)	−9.6 (14.7)	−0.4 (31.3)
Record low °C (°F)	−34.7 (−30.5)	−31.1 (−24.0)	−29.4 (−20.9)	−19.9 (−3.8)	−12.2 (10.0)	−1.1 (30.0)	0.8 (33.4)	1.8 (35.2)	−5.0 (23.0)	−8.4 (16.9)	−18.3 (−0.9)	−30.6 (−23.1)	−34.7 (−30.5)
Average precipitation mm (inches)	74.0 (2.91)	65.0 (2.56)	70.0 (2.76)	64.0 (2.52)	75.5 (2.97)	76.1 (3.00)	92.5 (3.64)	77.5 (3.05)	85.7 (3.37)	97.0 (3.82)	73.7 (2.90)	80.6 (3.17)	931.7 (36.68)
Source: Environment Canada (based on the Mont-Joli station)

== See also ==
- List of municipalities in Quebec
