= Les Hauteurs =

- Municipality
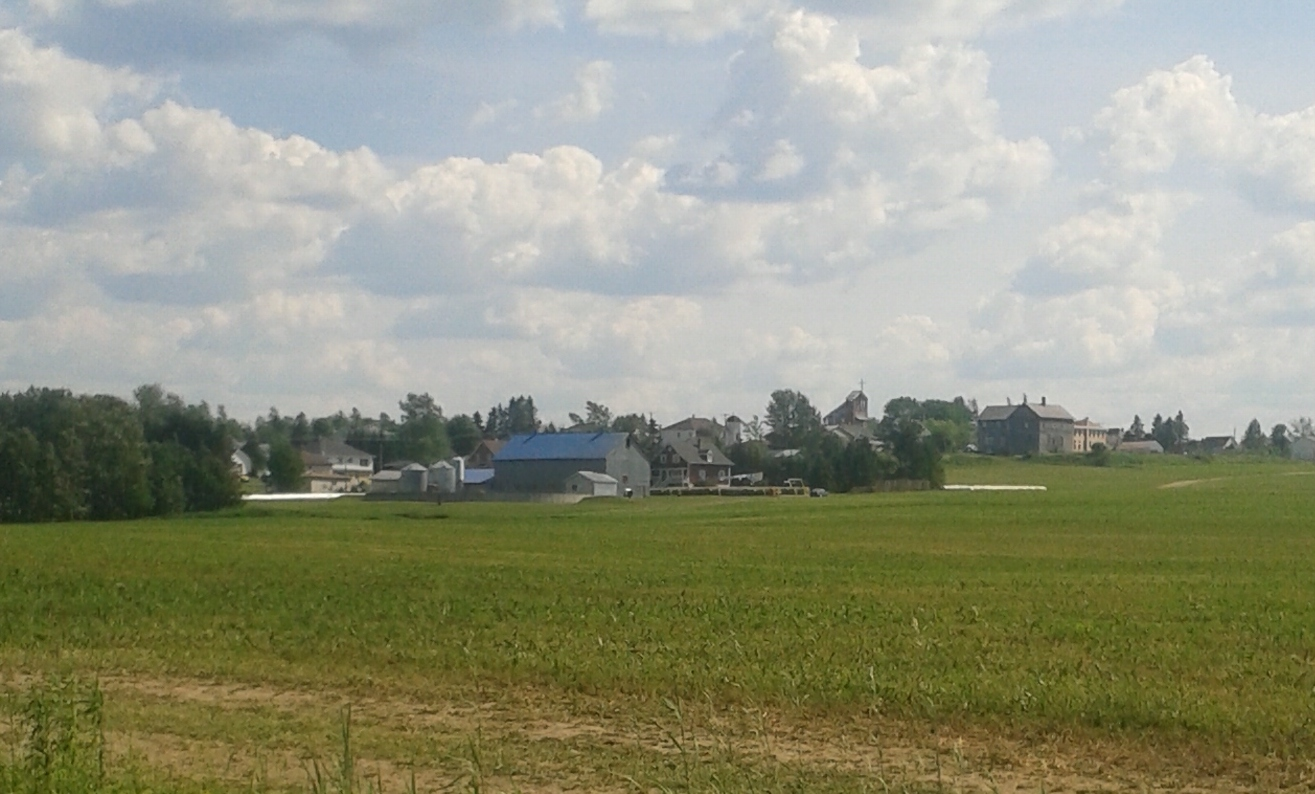
- View of the village of Les Hauteurs

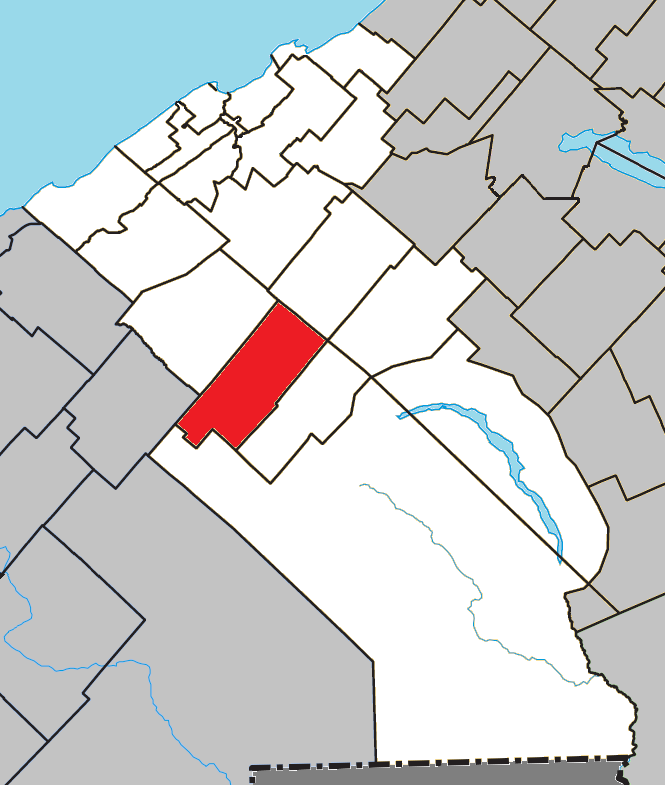
- Location within La Mitis RCM

- Location in eastern Quebec
- Coordinates: 48°23′N 68°07′W
- Country: Canada
- Province: Quebec
- Region: Bas-Saint-Laurent
- RCM: La Mitis
- Constituted: November 7, 1918

Government
  - Mayor: Mathieu Michaud
  - Federal riding: Rimouski-Neigette—Mitis—Matapédia—Les Basques
  - Prov. riding: Matane-Matapédia-Mitis

Area
  - Total: 104.40 km^{2} (40.31 sq mi)
  - Land: 102.92 km^{2} (39.74 sq mi)

Population (2021)
  - Total: 485
  - Density: 4.7/km^{2} (12/sq mi)
  - Pop 2016-2021: ▼3.8%
  - Dwellings: 263
- Time zone: UTC−05:00 (EST)
  - Summer (DST): UTC−04:00 (EDT)
- Postal code(s): G0K 1C0
- Area codes: 418 and 581
- Highways: R-298
- Website: municipalite. leshauteurs.qc.ca

Les Hauteurs (French pronunciation: [le otœʁ]) is a municipality in Quebec, Canada.

== History ==
The first three settlers arrived in the area in 1875. The post office opened in 1899 under the name ‘Hauteur’. Before the parish and municipality were officially created, the area was part of the townships of Ouimet and Massé. The Catholic parish of Saint-François-Xavier was canonically erected on 14 May 1918. The municipality was officially founded on 7 November 1918 under the name of Saint-François-Xavier-des-Hauteurs was officially created . In 1944, the post office was renamed Les Hauteurs-de-Rimouski. On 19 October 1993, the municipality shortened its name to simply ‘Les Hauteurs’. The parish church was destroyed by fire on 27 December 1997. It was rebuilt during the following summer and reopened in time for Christmas 1998.

== Demographics ==
In the 2021 Census of Population conducted by Statistics Canada, Les Hauteurs had a population of 485 living in 217 of its 263 total private dwellings, a change of −3.8% from its 2016 population of 504. With a land area of 102.92 km^{2} (39.74 sq mi), it had a population density of 4.7/km^{2} (12.2/sq mi) in 2021.

Canada census – Les Hauteurs community profile

	2021	2016	2011
Population	485 (-3.8% from 2016)	504 (-3.8% from 2011)	524 (-9.0% from 2006)
Land area	102.92 km^{2} (39.74 sq mi)	103.04 km^{2} (39.78 sq mi)	102.28 km^{2} (39.49 sq mi)
Population density	4.7/km^{2} (12/sq mi)	4.9/km^{2} (13/sq mi)	5.1/km^{2} (13/sq mi)
Median age	45.6 (M: 48.4, F: 43.2)	44.9 (M: 47.5, F: 42.0)	44.9 (M: 47.5, F: 41.5)
Private dwellings	263 (total) 217 (occupied)	263 (total)	249 (total)
Median household income	$49,600	$40,064	$34,705

References: 2021 2016 2011

== See also ==
- List of municipalities in Quebec
