= Sableuse River =

Location
- Country: Canada
- Province: Quebec
- City: Rimouski

Physical characteristics
- Source
  - location: Sableuse ponds, Saint-Vianney, Quebec, MRC La Matapédia, Quebec
  - coordinates: 48°38′28″N 67°25′21″W
- Mouth
  - location: Sableuse River Bay, Matapedia Lake, Lac-Matapédia (unorganized territory), Quebec
  - coordinates: 48°34′53″N 67°35′25″W
  - elevation: 0 m (0 ft)
- Length: 23.5 km (14.6 mi)

Basin features
- Tributaries
  - left: (from the confluence) Inconnue River (Sableuse River)
  - right: (from the confluence)

The Sableuse River is a watercourse in the Matapedia Valley, in administrative region of Bas-Saint-Laurent, in Quebec, Canada. Its origin lies in the Sableuse ponds in Saint-Vianney while its mouth lies in the Sableuse River Bay on Lake Matapedia.

This river flows into the regional county municipalities (RCM):

- La Matapedia Regional County Municipality: municipality Saint-Vianney, Quebec and the unorganized territory of Lac-Matapedia, Quebec;
- La Matanie Regional County Municipality: municipality Sainte-Paule.

This course river of the Matapedia Valley is descending towards the Southwest; it passes through the territory of Sainte-Paule and Matapedia Lake (at the Eastern boundary of the territory of Sayabec).

The Sableuse River flows into the bay of Sableuse River, located on the North shore of Matapedia Lake which discharge empties on the Eastern side in the Matapedia River. The latter flows Southeast into the Matapedia Valley up to the Restigouche River which flows East up to the west bank of the Chaleur Bay. The latter opens to the East on the Gulf of Saint Lawrence.

== Etymology ==
The Sableuse River has officially carried the name since at least 1972, before which some referred to it as Matane River. The Sableuse River Bay, whose name was designated in 2003, was also formerly referred to as the Matane River Bay.

== Geography ==
The Sableuse River is located in the La Matapédia Regional County Municipality in the Bas-Saint-Laurent administrative region. Its source, the Sableuse ponds, lie at 2.6 kilometres (1.6 mi) Northwest of the village of Saint-Vianney.

This source begins on the West side of the "Chemin des Towagodi Lakes" and is located at:

- 8.8 kilometres (5.5 mi) at the Western boundary of the West of Matane Wildlife Reserve;
- 24.8 kilometres (15.4 mi) Southeast of South Coastal of Gulf of Saint Lawrence;
- 14.9 kilometres (9.3 mi) from the confluence of the Sableuse River.

From its source, the Sableuse river course is often forming many small coils. Its course flows over 23.5 kilometres (14.6 mi) distributed in following segments:

- 2.8 kilometres (1.7 mi) West, up to the discharge (from the Northwest) of a small lake;
- 1.5 kilometres (0.93 mi) to the Southwest, up to the road path bridge of the 4th row;
- 1.9 kilometres (1.2 mi) Southwest up to the discharge (from the Northwest) of two little lakes;
- 5.6 kilometres (3.5 mi) Southwest up to the confluence of the Inconnue River (Sableuse River) (from the East);
- 2.8 kilometres (1.7 mi) Southwest up to the discharge (from the Northwest) of Portage Lake, Chaud Lake and Towago Lake;
- 6.7 kilometres (4.2 mi) Southward up to Crooked Creek (from the Northeast);
- 2.2 kilometres (1.4 mi) Southwest, cutting the Soucy Road, up to the confluence of the river

The river's mouth is located in the Seignory of Lac-Matapédia in the unorganized territory of Lac-Matapédia near Sayabec. Its outflow occurs in the Sableuse River Bay in Matapedia Lake, right in front of the Matane Island. This confluence is located at 2.2 kilometres (1.4 mi) from the mouth of Matapedia Lake.

== See also ==
- Matapedia Lake
- Matapedia River
- Inconnue River (Sableuse River)
- Matapedia Valley
- La Matanie Regional County Municipality
- Bas-Saint-Laurent, an administrative region of Quebec
