= Matapédia =

Matapédia may refer to:

== Places in Quebec, Canada ==
- Matapédia, Quebec, a municipality
- La Matapédia Regional County Municipality
- Matapédia (electoral district), a provincial electoral district
- Matapédia River
- Matapédia Valley
- Lake Matapédia, the source of the Matapédia river
- Matapédia station, a railway station on the Montreal to Halifax passenger service
- Saint-Alexis-de-Matapédia, a municipality

== Other ==
- Matapédia (album), by Kate & Anna McGarrigle, 1996
- HMCS Matapedia (K112), a corvette of the Canadian navy in World War II

== See also ==
- Metapedia
