= Seignory of Lac-Matapédia =

Forest in Quebec, Canada

Seigneurie-du-lac-Matapédia Regional Park
- French: Parc régional de la Seigneurie-du-Lac-Matapédia
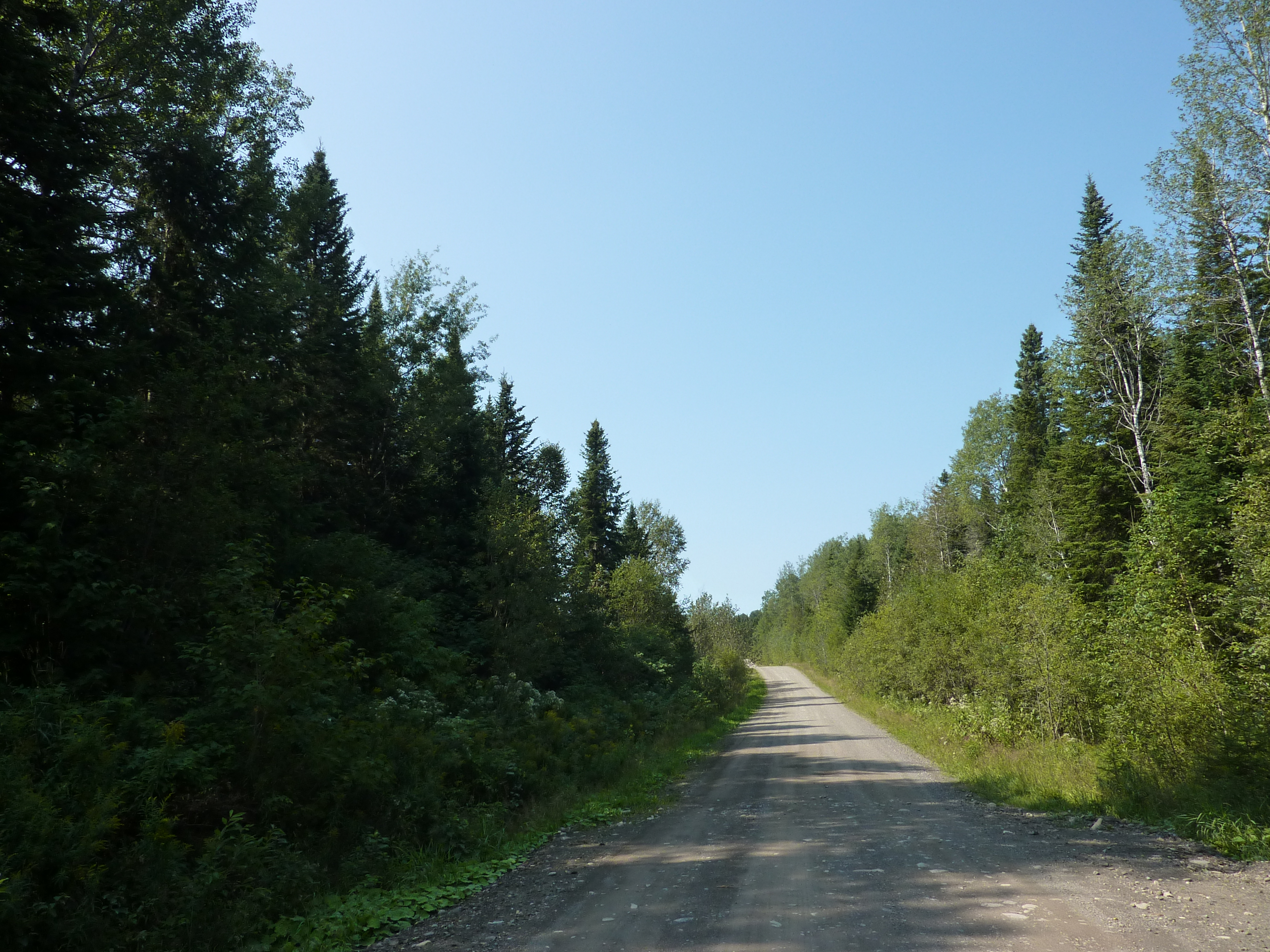
- Main road of the seignory of Lac-Matapédia

- Location within Quebec
- Location: La Matapédia Regional County Municipality, Bas-Saint-Laurent, Quebec, Canada
- Nearest city: Mont-Joli
- Coordinates: 48.5487°N 67.5120°W (Welcome desk)
- Area: 133 km^{2} (51 sq mi)
- Administrator: Parc régional de la Seigneurie-du-lac-Matapédia
- Website: www.parcmontagnedudiable.com

The seignory of Lac-Matapédia (French: seigneurie du Lac-Matapédia) is a forest land located on the north shore of Lake Matapédia in the Matapédia Valley in the unorganized territory of Lac-Matapédia, in Amqui, and in Sayabec, in the La Matapédia Regional County Municipality, in administrative region of Bas-Saint-Laurent, Quebec, Canada. The territory is under a "forest supply and management contract" (contrat d'approvisionnement et d'aménagement forestier or CAAF) with the Ministry of Natural Resources and Wildlife (Quebec). It is also the regional Park of Lac-Matapédia.

The territory is named after Lake Matapédia. The origins of this name are from the Mi'kmaq word matapegiag, meaning "rivers junction". In the 1600s, maps were showing the name Matapeguia.

== Geography ==
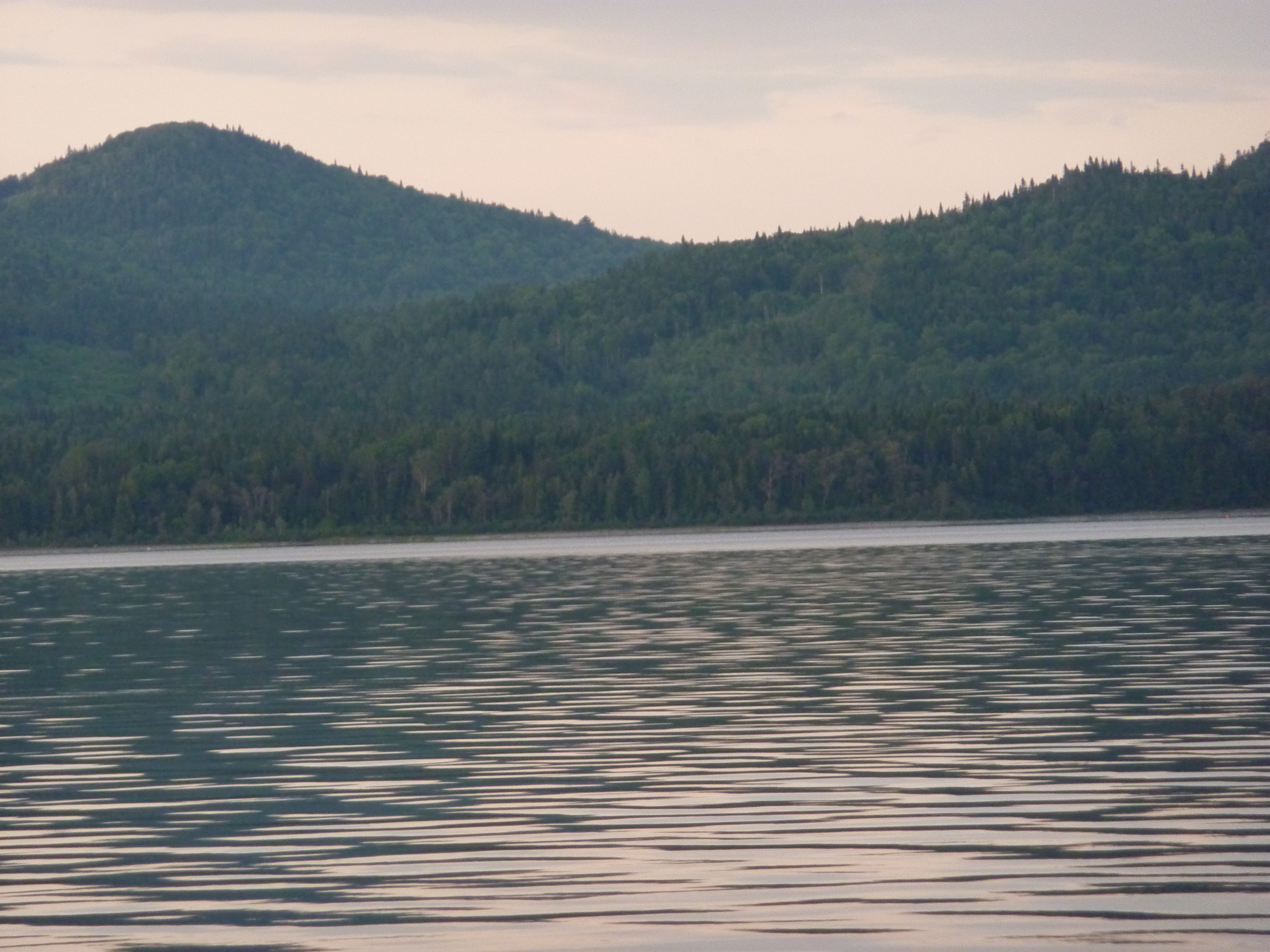
North shore of Lake Matapédia

The seignory of Lac-Matapédia is included in the unorganized territory of the same name, Lac-Matapédia, Quebec, in the La Matapédia Regional County Municipality in the Bas-Saint-Laurent region. Located on the Gaspé Peninsula in the Matapédia Valley, it is part of the Gaspésie touristic region.

The seignory is a league long on the north shore of Lake Matapédia, and covers an area of 68.3 km^{2} (26.4 sq mi). Formerly, the seignory covered the whole region around Lake Matapédia.

== History ==
The region was first inhabited by Mi'kmaq people before the arrival of Europeans in North America.

On May 26, 1694, the seignory of Lac-Matapeguia has been granted to Charles-Nicolas-Joseph d'Amours de Louviers (or Damour de Louvière) by the New France's governor, Comte de Frontenac, and the intendant, Champigny. Charles d'Amours de Louviers died in 1728 without explicitly bequeathed the seignory. However Marie-Françoise Damours de Louvières inherited it. She had married Jean-Baptiste Moyse de Rémond, and bequeathed the seignory to their son Jean-Baptiste Raymond. Having financial difficulties, he sold it for £700 in June 1796 to Patrick Langan.

Originally, the seignory covered the whole territory surrounding Lake Matapédia. In the 1830s during the building of Kempt and Matapédia Roads there was no mentions of this seignory on the maps. The parish of Sayabec had been canonically erected in 1896, and encompassed a portion of the seignory of Lac-Matapédia. In the 1920s around 500 families lived in the parish of Sayabec. To the east the parish of Val-Brillant, Quebec had been canonically erected in 1889 at the demand of Pierre Brillant, nicknamed the "Father of the Valley". This parish was completely included in the territory of the seignory. At the eastern tip of Lake Matapédia where it becomes the Matapédia River the parish of Amqui had been canonically erected in 1889, and included part of the seignory's territory. In the 1920s Amqui had more than 3,000 inhabitants.

=== Toponym ===
This toponymic designation is linked to that of the seigneury of Lac-Matapédia. The governor Louis de Buade de Frontenac and the intendant Champigny had granted this seigneury on May 26, 1694, to Charles-Nicolas-Joseph Damours.

The toponym "Parc régional de la Seigneurie-du-Lac-Matapédia" (Seigneurie-du-Lac-Matapédia Regional Park) is linked to the name of the Seigneurie (lordship). This toponym was made official on November 27, 2015, at the Place Names Bank of the Commission de toponymie du Québec.

== Protection ==
A protected area, the refuge forest of Lac-Matapédia, had been created to protect calypsos.

A part of the seignory of Lac-Matapédia had been constituted into a regional park.

== Tourism ==
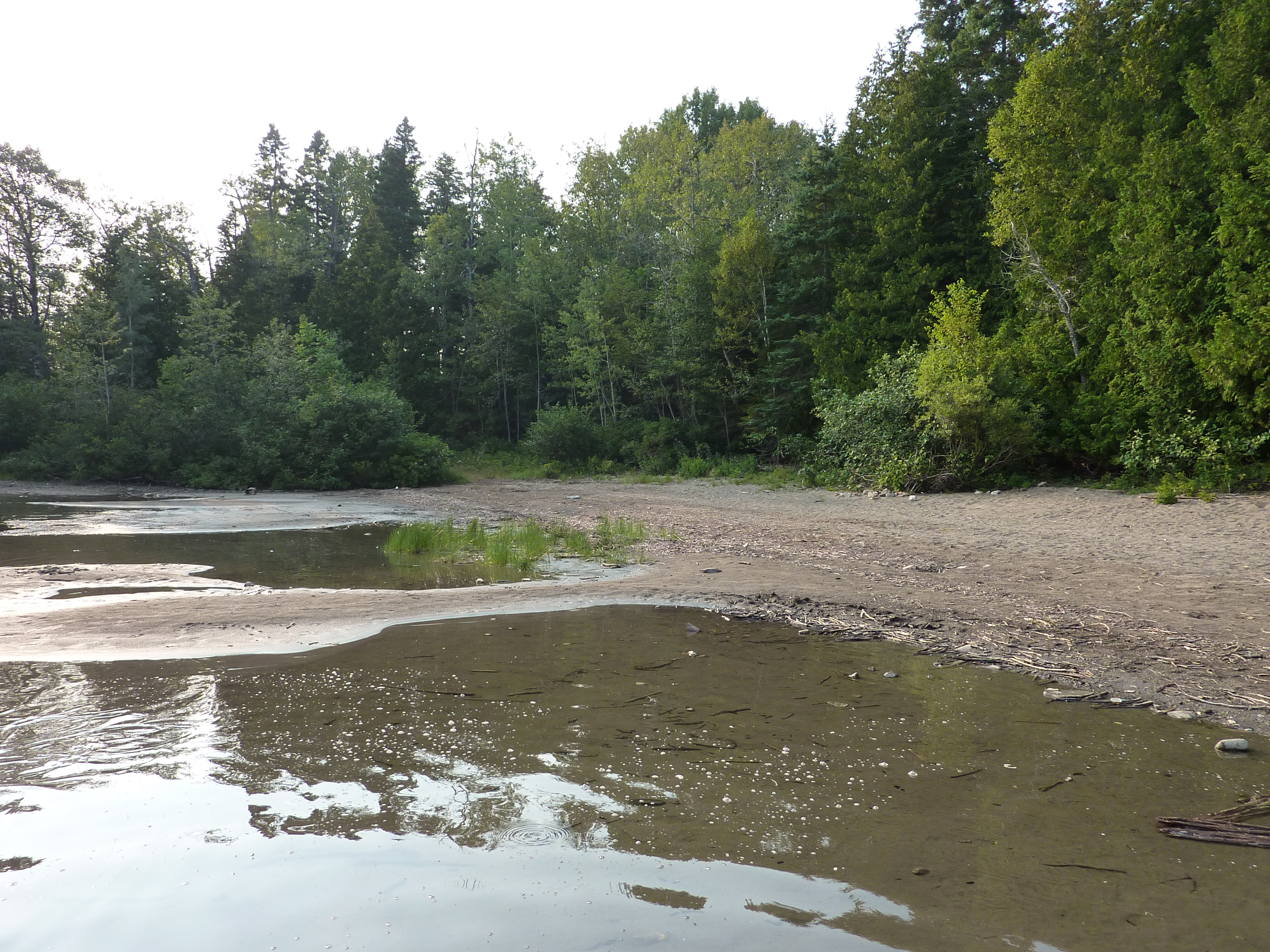
Dépôt à Soucy Beach

There are seven foot trails of a total of 19 km (12 mi) doing loops. The International Appalachian Trail runs across the seignory of Lac-Matapédia

Several beaches are located along the Lake Matapédia in the territory of the seignory. Those beaches are open to the public.

The access period to the park from June to November is by road 132 in Amqui. Visitors can take the Anse-Saint-Jean bridge. Then, turn right onto Rang Saint-Jean-Baptiste, then turn left onto Route Labrie. Turn left on the Soucy road and continue for about ten kilometers.

=== Activities ===
Outdoor enthusiasts can indulge in hiking or cycling on landscaped trails. In addition, they can practice water sports on beautiful Lake Matapedia, including birdwatching and beach activities in the summer season.

The park offers eight hiking trails with free access: the Promontoire (1.4 km (0.87 mi) for beginners), Lac Caché (1.4 km (0.87 mi) for beginners), Les Criques (4 km (2.5 mi) for beginners), the Petit Lac (4.9 km (3.0 mi) for beginners), the Crêtes (3.8 km (2.4 mi) of intermediate category), the Trois Soeurs (5.8 km (3.6 mi), intermediate), l'Héronnière (6.1 km (3.8 mi), intermediate) and the Rochers (6.4 km (4.0 mi), intermediate). The trails allow you to admire the panorama of the Matapedia valley.

The park website indicates that the Three Sisters Trail largely corresponds to the International Appalachian Trail. In addition, the return to the parking lot (starting point) is via the Coulée trail for shared use.

== See also ==
- Matapédia Lake
- Lac-Matapédia, Quebec

== Bibliography ==
- Courville, Serge; Labrecque, Serge (1998). Seigneurie et fiefs du Québec : nomenclature et cartographie [Seignories and fiefs of Quebec: nomenclature and cartography] (in French). Quebec, Quebec: Faculté des Lettres de l'Université Laval.
- Michaud, Joseph Désiré (1922). Notes historiques sur la vallée de la Matapédia [Historical notes on the Matapédia Valley] (in French). Val-Brillant, Quebec: La Voix du lac. OCLC 797064816.
- Dompierre, Michel; Leblanc, Bertrant (2004). La Matapédia (in French). Édition MRC de La Matapédia. ISBN 2-9808660-0-8.
- Collaborative work (2007). Atlas écologique de la MRC de La Matapédia [Ecological atlas of La Matapédia RCM]. Édition MRC de La Matapédia. ISBN 978-2-9808660-4-3.
- Pelletier, Michel (1995). Mon coin de pays... La Matapédia ! [My homeland... La Matapédia!] (in French). ISBN 2-9804604-0-0.
- Rouillard, Eugène (1899). La colonisation dans les comté de Témiscouata, Rimouski, Matane, Bonaventure, Gaspé [Colonization in the Témiscouata, Rimouski, Matane, Bonaventure, Gaspé counties] (in French).
