= Amqui =

- City
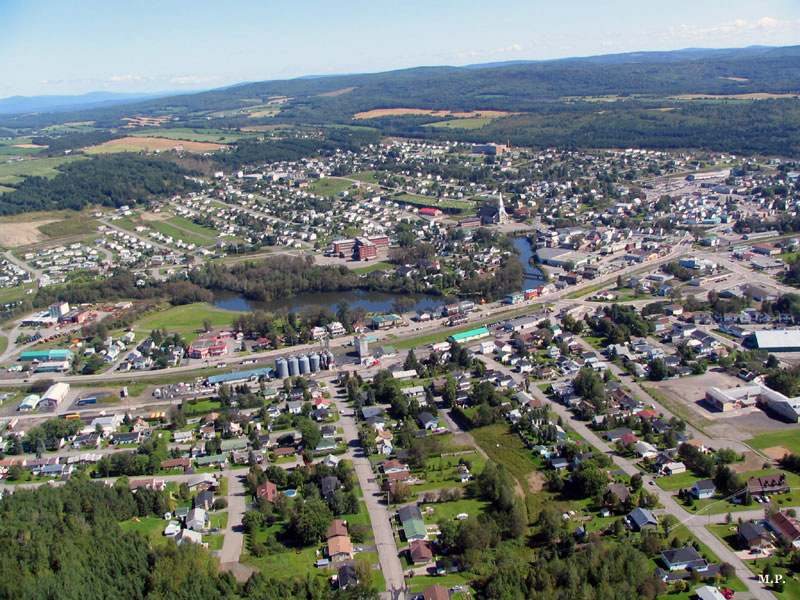
- Aerial view of Amqui

- Coat of arms

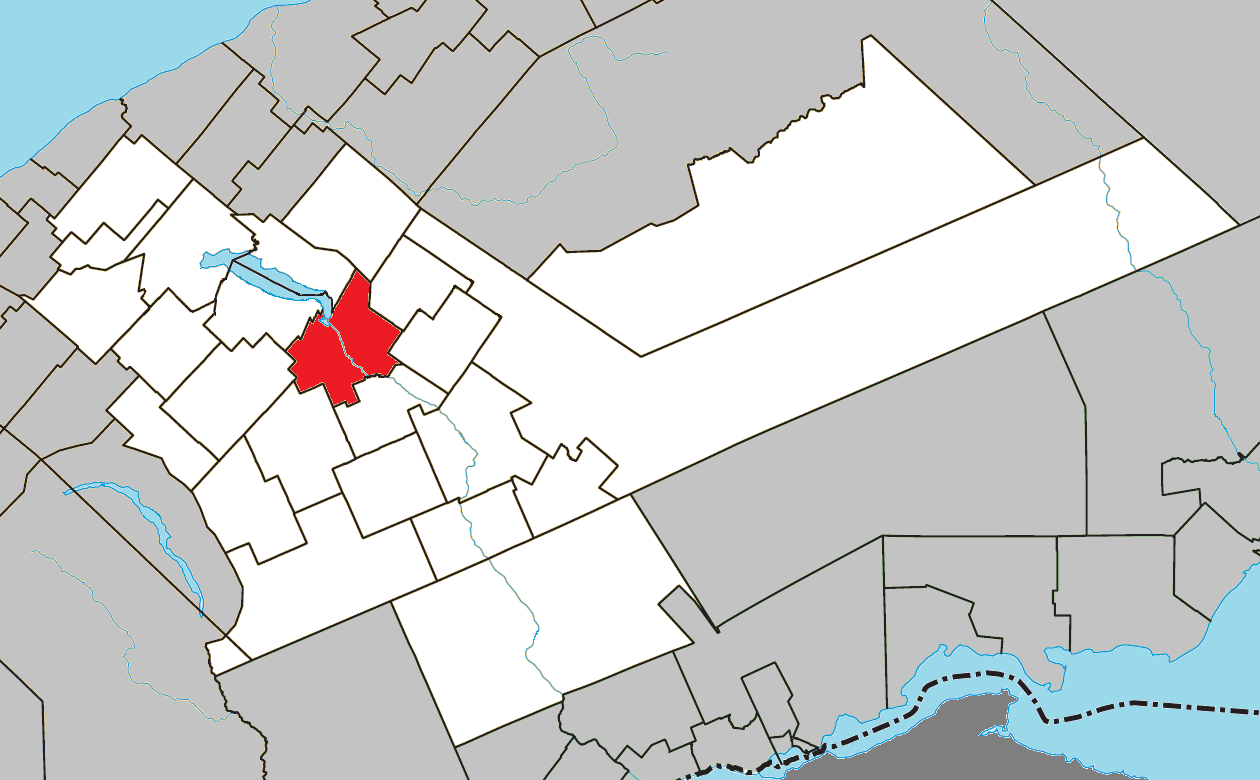
- Location within La Matapédia RCM

- Location in eastern Quebec
- Coordinates: 48°28′N 67°26′W
- Country: Canada
- Province: Quebec
- Region: Bas-Saint-Laurent
- RCM: La Matapédia
- Settled: 1870s
- Constituted: January 16, 1991

Government
  - Mayor: Sylvie Blanchette
  - Fed. riding: Rimouski-Neigette—Mitis—Matapédia—Les Basques
  - Prov. riding: Matane-Matapédia-Mitis

Area
  - Total: 128.27 km^{2} (49.53 sq mi)
  - Land: 121.02 km^{2} (46.73 sq mi)

Population (2021)
  - Total: 5,999
  - Density: 49.6/km^{2} (128/sq mi)
  - Change 2016-21: ▼2.9%
  - Dwellings: 3,015
- Time zone: UTC−5 (EST)
  - Summer (DST): UTC−4 (EDT)
- Postal code(s): G5J
- Area codes: 418 and 581
- Highways: R-132 R-195
- Website: www.ville.amqui.qc.ca

Amqui (/ɒmkwiː/; French: [amkwi]) is a town in eastern Quebec, Canada, at the base of the Gaspé peninsula in Bas-Saint-Laurent. Located at the confluence of the Humqui and Matapédia Rivers, it is the seat of La Matapédia Regional County Municipality. The main access road is Quebec Route 132.

The Mi'kmaq word amgoig, also written humqui, unkoui and ankwi, means "the place to have fun", "half wall" or "place of amusement and pleasure." Another Mi'kmaq name for the area is Amkooĭk or Mkooögwĭk which aptly describes the area as "boggy." One source postulates that its name comes from the swirling water at the junction of the Humqui and Matapédia rivers. However, the most plausible explanation appears to be more pragmatic: Amqui was formerly a place where Amerindians gathered for pow wows.

== History ==
Amqui, 1895

Originally Mi'kmaq territory, the area was granted as a seignory by Louis de Buade de Frontenac to Charles-Nicolas-Joseph D'Amours in 1694. D'Amours died in 1728 and none of his descendants claimed the rights to the seigneury. So it remained a remote and undeveloped land until the 19th century. In 1830 construction began on the Kempt Road, a strategic military road between Quebec and the Maritimes, completed in 1833, that opened the area to colonization. But it was the construction of the Intercolonial Railway in the 1870s that brought real development.

In 1879, the post office opened under the name Amqui. In 1881, the Mission of Saint-Benoît-Joseph-Labre was established, named after Benedict Joseph Labre. By 1884, the town became known as a great destination for salmon and trout fishing. In 1889, the mission became a parish and the following year it was incorporated as the Parish Municipality of Saint-Benoît-Joseph-Labre.

In 1907, the village itself separated from the parish municipality and was incorporated as the Village Municipality of Saint-Benoît-Joseph-Labre, renamed to Amqui in 1948. It gained town status in 1961.

In January 1991, the Parish Municipality of Saint-Benoît-Joseph-Labre was merged into the Town of Amqui.

On March 13, 2023, a pickup truck hit eleven pedestrians along Route 132, killing three people and injuring eight.

== Geography ==
Amqui is located to the south of the St. Lawrence River in the Matapédia Valley, which was formed by the Chic-Choc Mountains. The valley is of glacial origin and was formed during the Paleozoic era millions of years ago. The region is characterized by gentle slopes through which the Matapédia river snakes from the northwest to the southeast. The city is located at the confluence of the Humqui and Matapédia rivers.

The city is situated 415 km (258 mi) northeast of Quebec City, 34 km (21 mi) west of Gaspé and 80 km (50 mi) north of New Brunswick. Neighbouring urban centres include Rimouski and Mont-Joli, at 105 km (65 mi) and 70 km (43 mi) to the west, respectively, and Matane, 65 km (40 mi) to the north. Amqui is located 25 km (16 mi) east of Sayabec and 20 km (12 mi) northwest of Causapscal, the two largest municipalities of La Matapédia after Amqui. The city borders Saint-Vianney and Saint-Tharcisius to the north, Saint-Alexandre-des-Lacs to the east, Lac-au-Saumon and Saint-Léon-le-Grand to the south, as well as Sainte-Irène and Val-Brillant to the west. The Couturval hamlet is part of Amqui.

=== Climate ===
Amqui has a humid continental climate (Dfb). Being surrounded by the Chic-Chocs creates unique climatic conditions in the region: a long and snowy winter and a hot and humid summer.

Climate data for Amqui, Quebec (1981-2010): 183m
Month	Jan	Feb	Mar	Apr	May	Jun	Jul	Aug	Sep	Oct	Nov	Dec	Year
Record high °C (°F)	11.0 (51.8)	12.0 (53.6)	16.7 (62.1)	28.5 (83.3)	32.8 (91.0)	33.3 (91.9)	33.5 (92.3)	33.9 (93.0)	32.2 (90.0)	24.5 (76.1)	18.9 (66.0)	17.8 (64.0)	33.9 (93.0)
Mean daily maximum °C (°F)	−9.9 (14.2)	−7.8 (18.0)	−1.7 (28.9)	6.1 (43.0)	14.2 (57.6)	20.2 (68.4)	22.8 (73.0)	21.5 (70.7)	16.1 (61.0)	9.1 (48.4)	1.2 (34.2)	−5.9 (21.4)	7.2 (44.9)
Daily mean °C (°F)	−15.0 (5.0)	−13.4 (7.9)	−7.0 (19.4)	1.2 (34.2)	8.1 (46.6)	13.9 (57.0)	17.0 (62.6)	15.8 (60.4)	10.9 (51.6)	4.7 (40.5)	−2.4 (27.7)	−10.1 (13.8)	2.0 (35.6)
Mean daily minimum °C (°F)	−20.0 (−4.0)	−18.9 (−2.0)	−12.2 (10.0)	−3.8 (25.2)	2.0 (35.6)	7.6 (45.7)	11.2 (52.2)	10.1 (50.2)	5.7 (42.3)	0.2 (32.4)	−5.9 (21.4)	−14.3 (6.3)	−3.2 (26.3)
Record low °C (°F)	−40.0 (−40.0)	−38.9 (−38.0)	−35.0 (−31.0)	−28.5 (−19.3)	−12.2 (10.0)	−4.5 (23.9)	1.0 (33.8)	−2.2 (28.0)	−6.0 (21.2)	−13.5 (7.7)	−26.0 (−14.8)	−34.4 (−29.9)	−40.0 (−40.0)
Average precipitation mm (inches)	85.3 (3.36)	69.5 (2.74)	66.5 (2.62)	75.9 (2.99)	89.5 (3.52)	93.3 (3.67)	102.1 (4.02)	100.5 (3.96)	81.6 (3.21)	88.0 (3.46)	98.2 (3.87)	81.8 (3.22)	1,032.2 (40.64)
Average snowfall cm (inches)	75.4 (29.7)	63.5 (25.0)	51.7 (20.4)	30.3 (11.9)	3.0 (1.2)	0.0 (0.0)	0.0 (0.0)	0.0 (0.0)	0.2 (0.1)	7.2 (2.8)	46.7 (18.4)	66.7 (26.3)	344.7 (135.8)
Average precipitation days (≥ 0.2 mm)	18.3	15.0	14.6	13.6	16.2	14.5	15.7	15.8	16.9	16.5	16.4	17.9	191.4
Average snowy days (≥ 0.2 cm)	17.4	13.9	12.8	6.3	1.0	0.0	0.0	0.0	0.2	2.7	9.8	16.8	80.9
Source: Environment Canada

== Demographics ==
In the 2021 Census of Population conducted by Statistics Canada, Amqui had a population of 5,999 living in 2,846 of its 3,015 total private dwellings, a change of −2.9% from its 2016 population of 6,178. With a land area of 121.02 km^{2} (46.73 sq mi), it had a population density of 49.6/km^{2} (128.4/sq mi) in 2021.

Canada census – Amqui community profile

	2021	2016	2011
Population	5,999 (-2.9% from 2016)	6,178 (-2.3% from 2011)	6,322 (+1.0% from 2006)
Land area	121.02 km^{2} (46.73 sq mi)	121.17 km^{2} (46.78 sq mi)	120.81 km^{2} (46.65 sq mi)
Population density	49.6/km^{2} (128/sq mi)	51/km^{2} (130/sq mi)	52.3/km^{2} (135/sq mi)
Median age	52.0 (M: 50.4, F: 53.2)	48.8 (M: 48, F: 49.7)	47.2 (M: 46.2, F: 48.0)
Private dwellings	3,015 (total) 2,846 (occupied)	2,992 (total)	2,925 (total)
Median household income	$60,000	$49,728	$49,702

Notes: Population in 1996: 6,800 (+4.3% from 1991) - Population in 1991: 6,518
References: 2021 2016 2011

Historical census populations – Amqui

Year	Pop.	±%
1911	2,400	—
1921	3,505	+46.0%
1931	3,226	−8.0%
1941	1,593	−50.6%
1951	2,599	+63.2%
1956	3,247	+24.9%
1961	3,659	+12.7%

Year	Pop.	±%
1966	3,854	+5.3%
1971	3,797	−1.5%
1976	3,949	+4.0%
1981	4,048	+2.5%
1986	4,249	+5.0%
1991	4,339	+2.1%
1996	6,800	+56.7%

Year	Pop.	±%
2001	6,473	−4.8%
2006	6,261	−3.3%
2011	6,322	+1.0%
2016	6,178	−2.3%
2021	5,999	−2.9%

Source: Statistics Canada

According to the Statistics Canada website, 6,090 of Amqui's 6,120 residents speak French as their first language. In addition, 12% can speak both French and English.

Mother tongue	Population	Percentage
French	5,755	99.3%
English	15	0.3%
English and French	10	0.2%
Other languages	10	0.2%

== Government ==
=== Municipal ===
Members of the city council are elected every four years on the first Sunday of November and are conducted electronically. It is composed of seven members:

Term	Role	Name
2025-2029	Mayor	Sylvie Blanchette
2025-2029	Councillor
2025-2029	#1	Éric Couture
2025-2029	#2	Sarah-Josée Fournier
2025-2029	#3	Pier-Luc Denoncourt
2025-2029	#4	Carl Patry
2025-2029	#5	Sarah-Maude Dubé
2025-2029	#6	Luc Daigle

List of former mayors:

- Pierre Zébédée Dubé (1907–1908)
- Duncan Napoléon Dubé (1908–1911)
- Georges Léonidas Dionne (1911–1915)
- Alfred Mercier (1915–1917)
- Charles Viens (1917–1921)
- Gratien Langlais (1921–1923)
- Joseph Napoléon Pérusse (1923–1925, 1927–1933)
- M. J. Romuald Dionne (1925–1927)
- Joseph Norbert Michaud (1933–1937)
- Alcide Harvey (1937–1941)
- J. Octave Bérubé (1941–1945)
- Gérard Dionne (1945–1949)
- Ludger Leblanc (1949–1955)
- J. Olier Larocque (1955–1959)
- Gérard Dubé (1959–1962, 1970–1975)
- Georges Étienne Guérette (1962–1970)
- Sylvio Bérubé (1975–1982)
- Jean Luc Joncas (1982–1984)
- Gaétan Archambault (1984–1998)
- Gaëtan Ruest (1998–2017)
- Pierre D'Amours (2017–2021)
- Sylvie Blanchette (2021–present)

=== Federal and provincial ===
Provincially, Amqui is represented by Pascal Bérubé in the Matane-Matapédia-Mitis electoral district.

Federally, the city is represented by Maxime Blanchette-Joncas in the Rimouski-Neigette—Mitis—Matapédia—Les Basques electoral district.

== Infrastructure ==
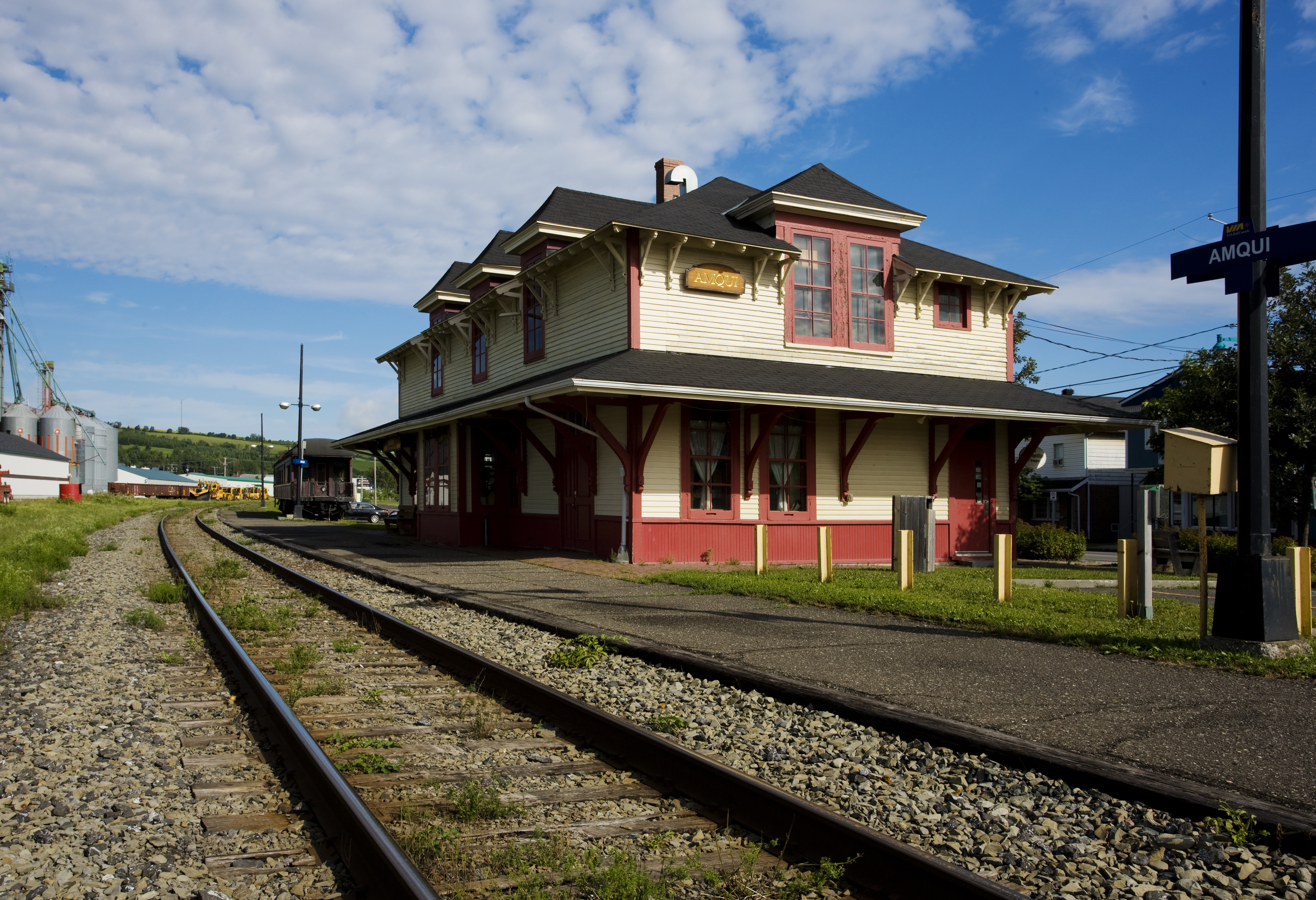
Amqui Train Station

The two-storey Amqui railway station built in 1904, is served by Via Rail's Ocean, and Montreal – Gaspé trains (to 2013 when the latter service was suspended). Both trains share the same rail line between Montréal and Matapédia. The building was heritage-designated by the Canadian government under the Heritage Railway Stations Protection Act in 1988.

The station is representative of the boom at the turn of the century, and the associated expansion of the railways in general, the Intercolonial Railway of Canada (IRC) in particular. Amqui depended on the railway to transport their agricultural products and finished parts made of wood. Subsequently, Amqui became an important stop on the train's route from Montréal to Halifax, and from Montréal to Gaspé.

The design of the station Amqui is unusual for a station of the IRC. It is distinguished by its two-storey design, housing the station master and his family on the top floor.

== Notable people ==
- Charles Beaulieu - academic, civil servant, and businessman
- Alfred Belzile - politician and farmer
- Sébastien Caron - former National Hockey League goaltender
- Solange Charest - politician
- Jasmine Dubé - actor, writer and director
- Raymond Dumais - Roman Catholic bishop
- Éric Dupont - writer
- Madeleine Gagnon - educator, literary critic and writer
- Jean-Luc Joncas - politician
- Perrault LaRue - politician
- Catherine LeFrançois - IFBB professional bodybuilder
- Alexandre Mallet - professional ice hockey player

== See also ==
- List of cities in Quebec
- 20th-century municipal history of Quebec
