= Lake Matapedia =

Lake in Quebec, Canada

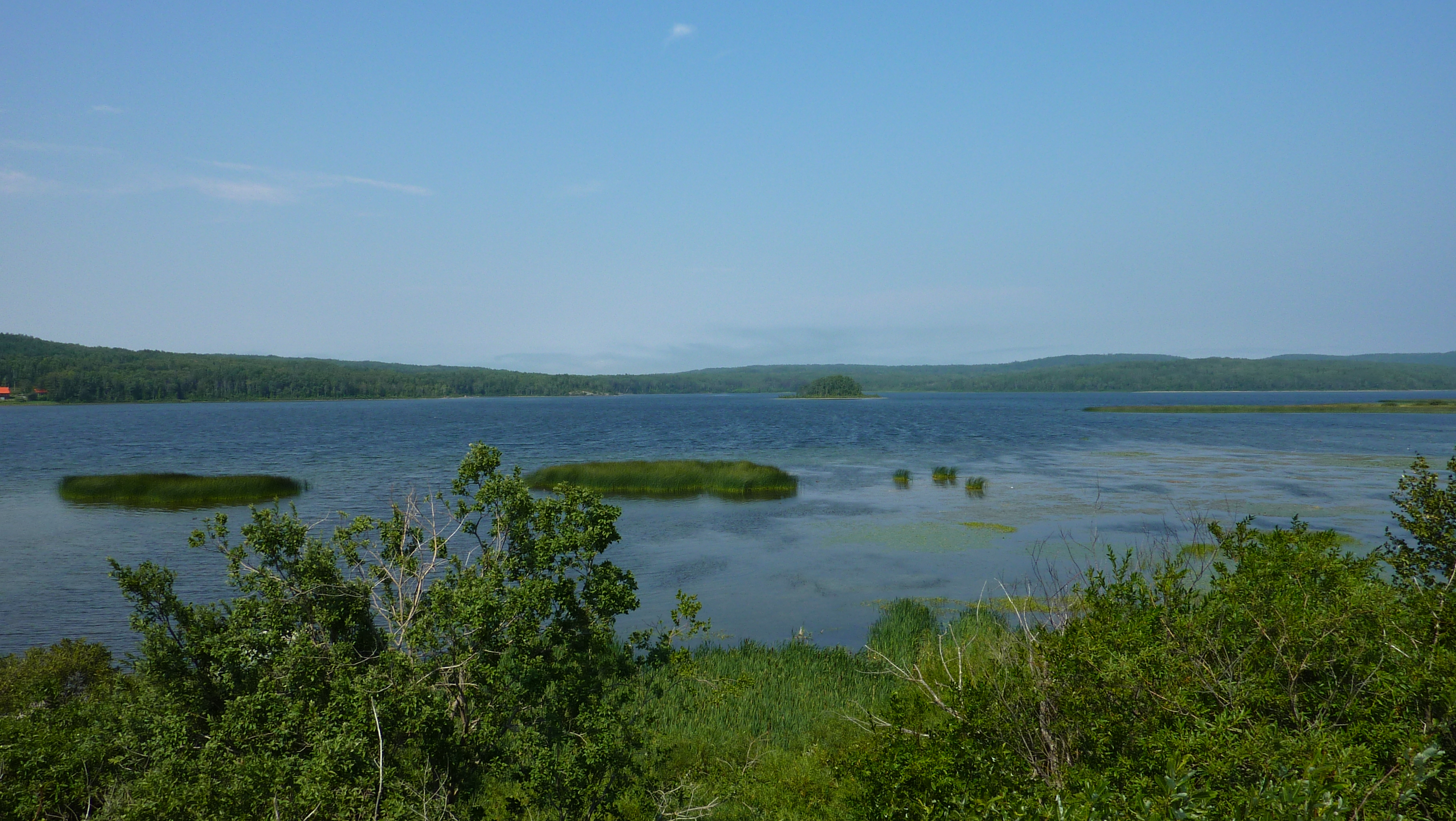
- Northwest corner of the lake, at Sayabec

- Location within Quebec
- Location: La Matapédia Regional County Municipality, Quebec
- Coordinates: 48°33′N 67°33′W
- Primary outflows: Matapédia River
- Basin countries: Canada
- Max. length: 19 km (12 mi)
- Max. width: 3 km (1.9 mi)
- Surface area: 38 km^{2} (15 sq mi)

Lake Matapedia is a body of water in the Matapedia Valley, located in the unorganized territory of Lac-Matapédia, in Sayabec, in Val-Brillant, in La Matapédia Regional County Municipality, in administrative region of Bas-Saint-Laurent, in Quebec, Canada, and the source of the Matapedia River. The town of Amqui lies at the southeast corner of the lake.

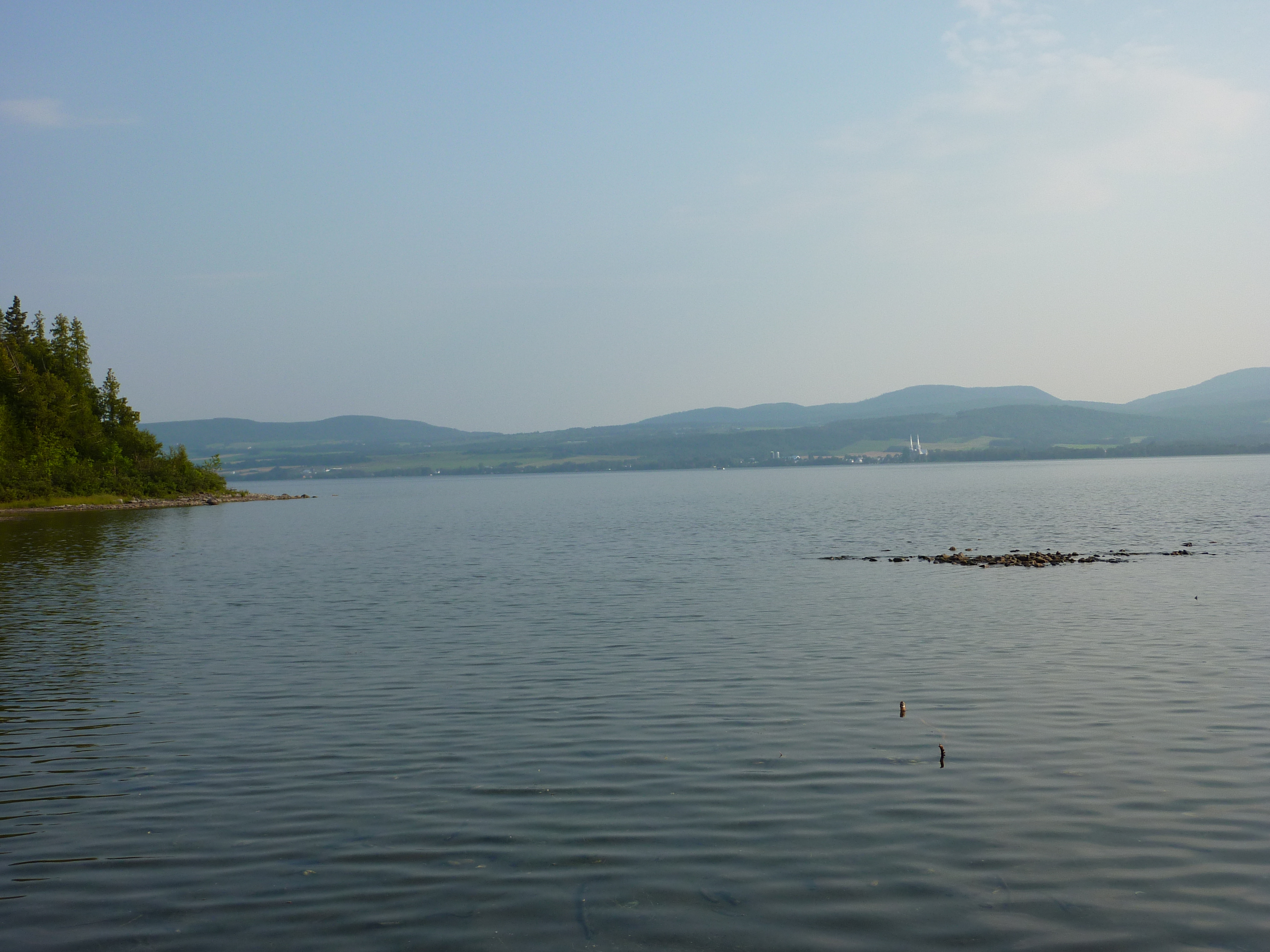
The center of lake Matapedia, seen from Lac-Matapédia, Quebec

== Geography ==
With an area of 38 square kilometres (15 sq mi), it extends over a length of 19 kilometres (12 mi) and a maximum width of 3 kilometres (1.9 mi) between Sayabec and Amqui in the Matapedia Valley. Matapedia Lake is located in the center of the Matapedia Valley and formed by the Appalachian Mountains mountain range in the Notre Dame Mountains section.

Lake Matapedia is located about thirty kilometers south of Matane in the former Seignory of Lac-Matapédia granted in 1694 to Charles-Nicolas-Joseph Damours of Louvières. Fed by several watercourses including the Sayabec River at the mouth of which the municipality of Sayabec is located, it discharges into the Baie des Chaleurs by the rivers Matapédia and Restigouche. Lake Matapedia is nicknamed the “Jewel of the Valley”. The riparian municipalities of Lac Matapédia are Sayabec, Val-Brillant and Amqui as well as the unorganized territory of Lac-Matapédia.

== Toponymy ==
The spelling of this lake takes several forms depending on the geographers and the times. This body of water is first identified in 1807 on Carey's map in the graphic form of L. Matapediuch. In addition, in 1815, the geographer Joseph Bouchette named Lac Malapediach in his Topographical Description, while writing Metapediach in the index of the work. In 1863, the geographer Stanislas Drapeau presented and lent him the graphic form Matapediac, as well as the road and the township on a published map (ref.: Studies on the development of the colonization of Lower Canada). However, in the text of this work, Drapeau uses the Matapedia spelling for this body of water, the river and the township. In addition, in the 1870 map of Quebec designed by Eugène Taché, the current spelling was used: Matapedia.

Father Pacifique writes that the Mi'kmaq name Matapedia comes from "matapegiag", meaning "the river splits into several branches, makes a fork". While Joseph-Étienne Guinard affirms that Matapedia has more the meaning of "junction of rivers", of mata, "junction" and pegiag, "river".

The toponym "Lac Matapédia" was officially registered on December 5, 1968 at the place name bank of the Commission de toponymie du Québec.

== Tourism ==
The Lake Matapedia is a good body of water for tourism. Nautical activities such as fishing, sailing, windsurfing and swimming are easily practicable given the low density of users of the lake. In addition, there is a marina in Val-Brillant and an observation and boat launch park called Pierre-Brochu in Sayabec. The fine point of Amqui is a large beach where you can practice several activities including camping and wakeboarding. There is also a site developed for camping and a beach at Charlie's Bay (also called Charlie's Bay) in Sayabec and a campground at the Val-Brillant marina. Lac Matapédia is part of the tourist region of Gaspésie in the Matapedia Valley sub-region. The International Appalachian Trail runs along the north shore of Lake Matapedia, connecting Causapscal to the Réserve faunique de Matane.

== Gallery ==
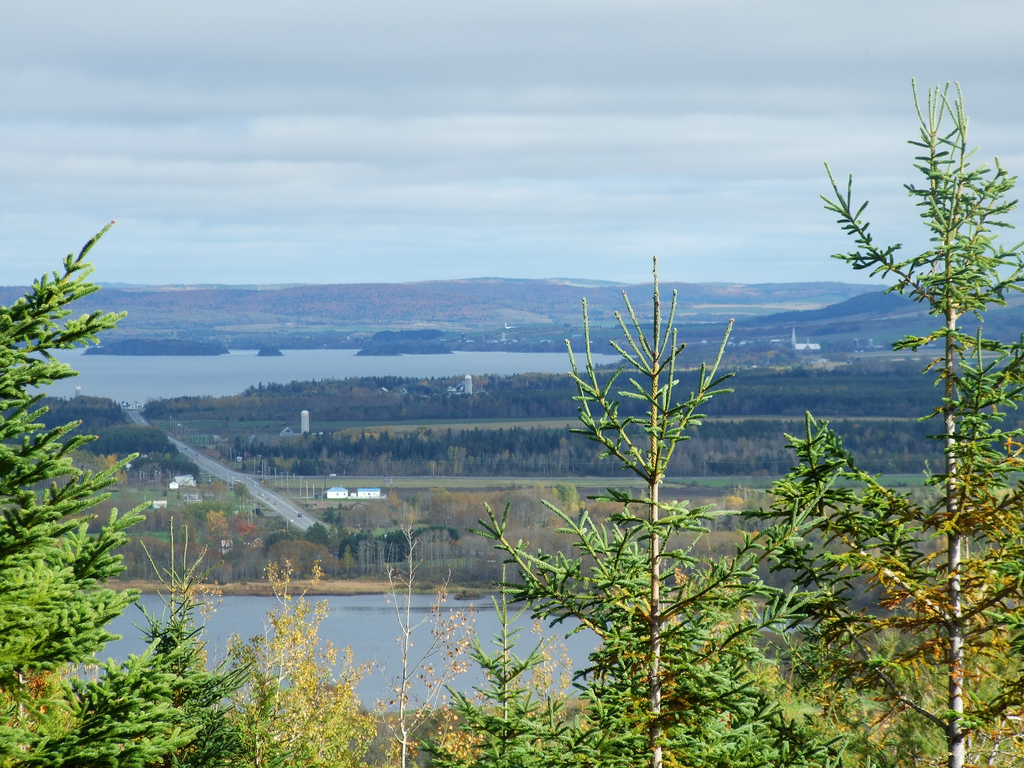
Lake Matapédia view from Val-Brillant

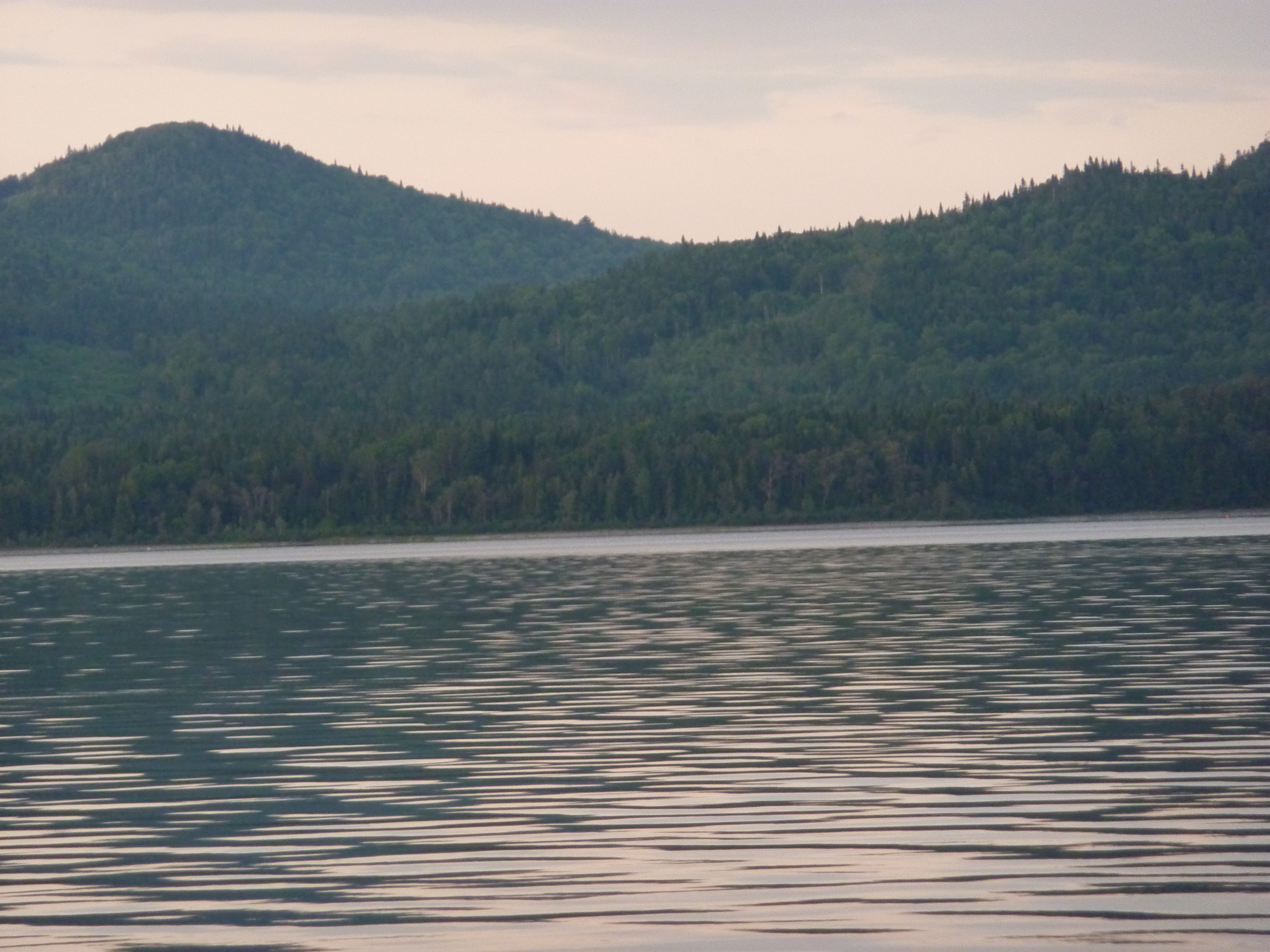
North shore of lake Matapédia in front of Val-Brillant

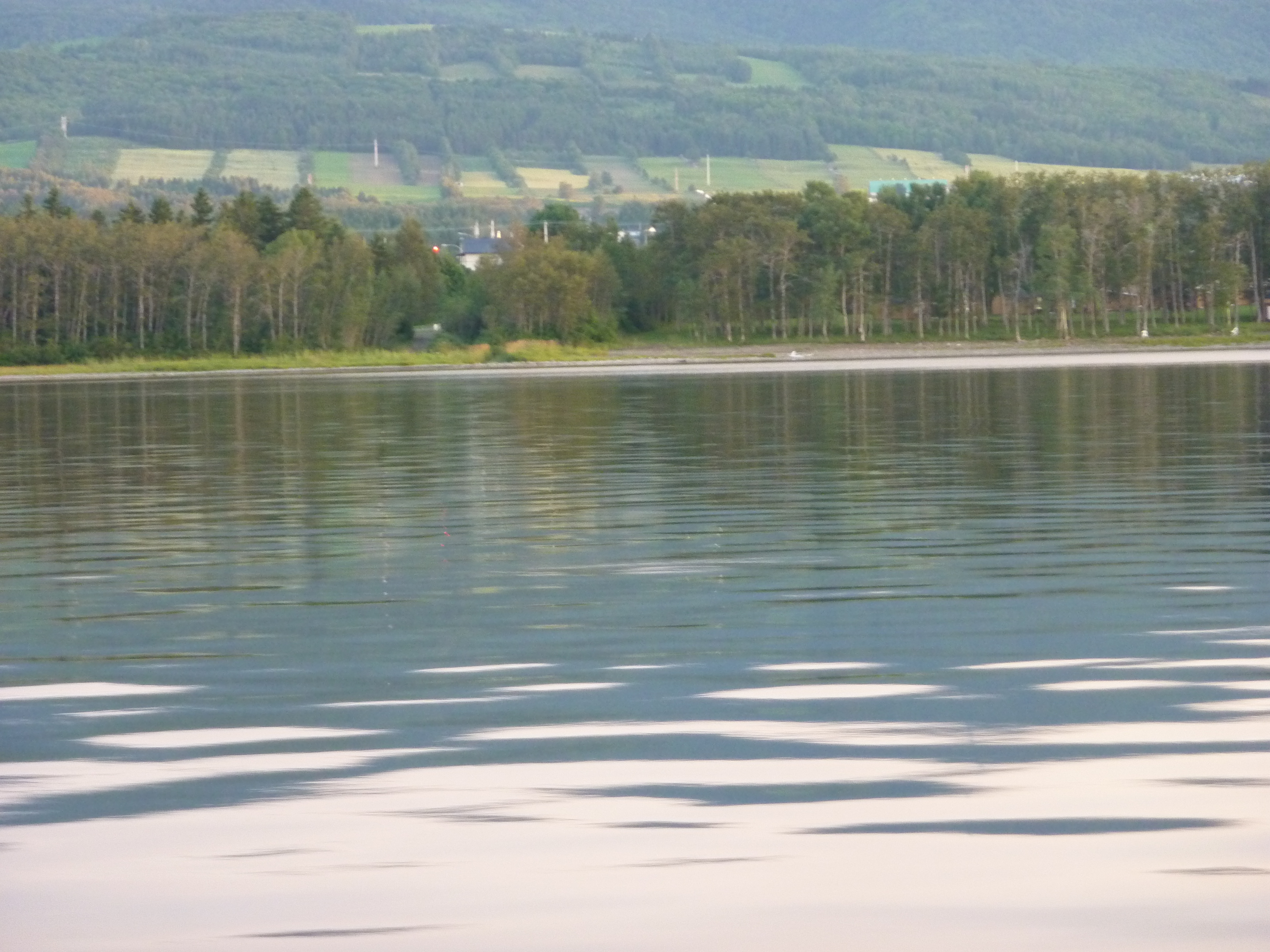
South shore of lake Matapédia at Val-Brillant

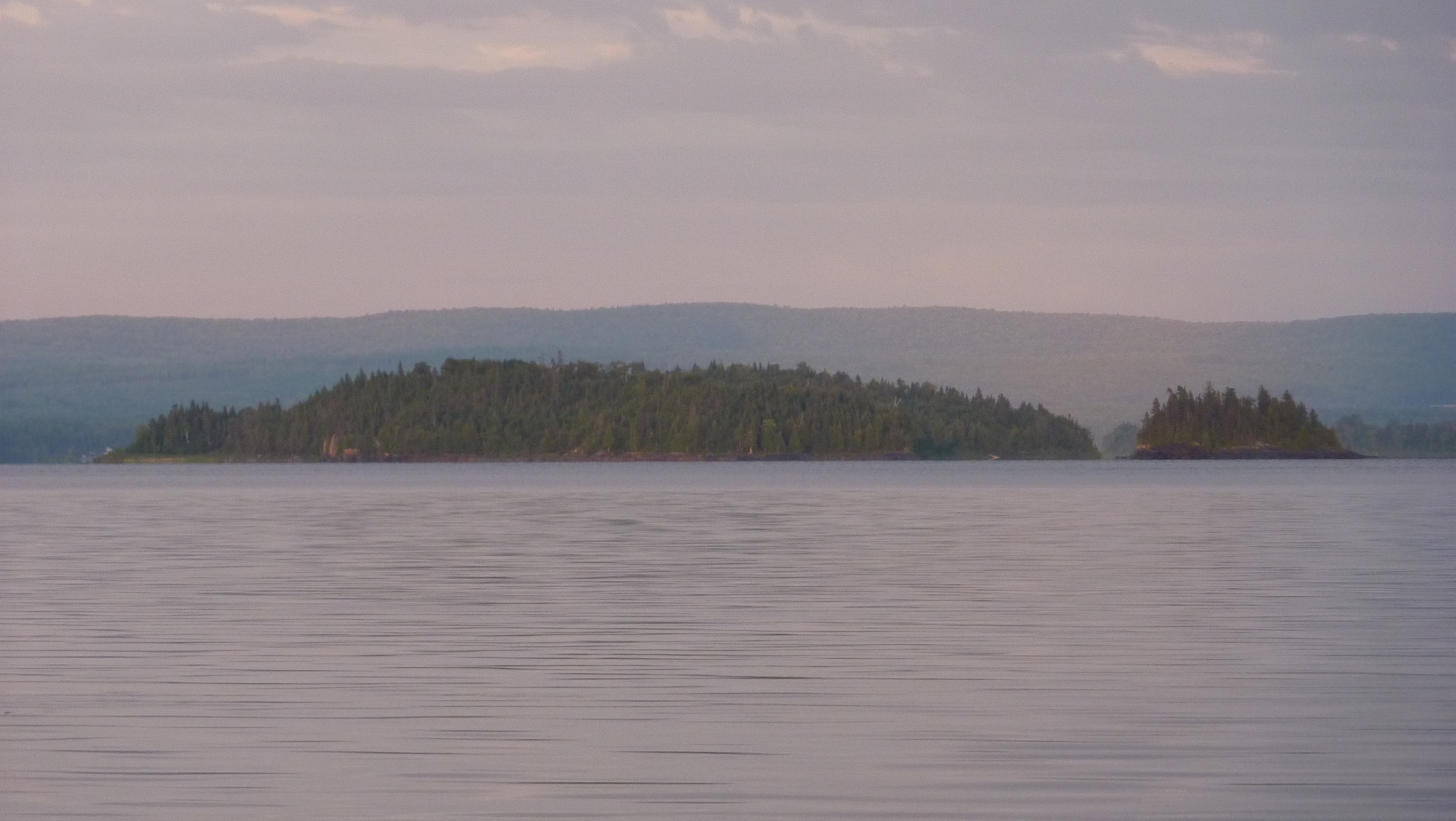
Islands of lake Matapédia at the level of Val-Brillant

== See also ==
- Seigneurie-du-lac-Matapédia Regional Park
