= Matapedia Valley =

Valley in Canada

- Vallée de la Matapédia
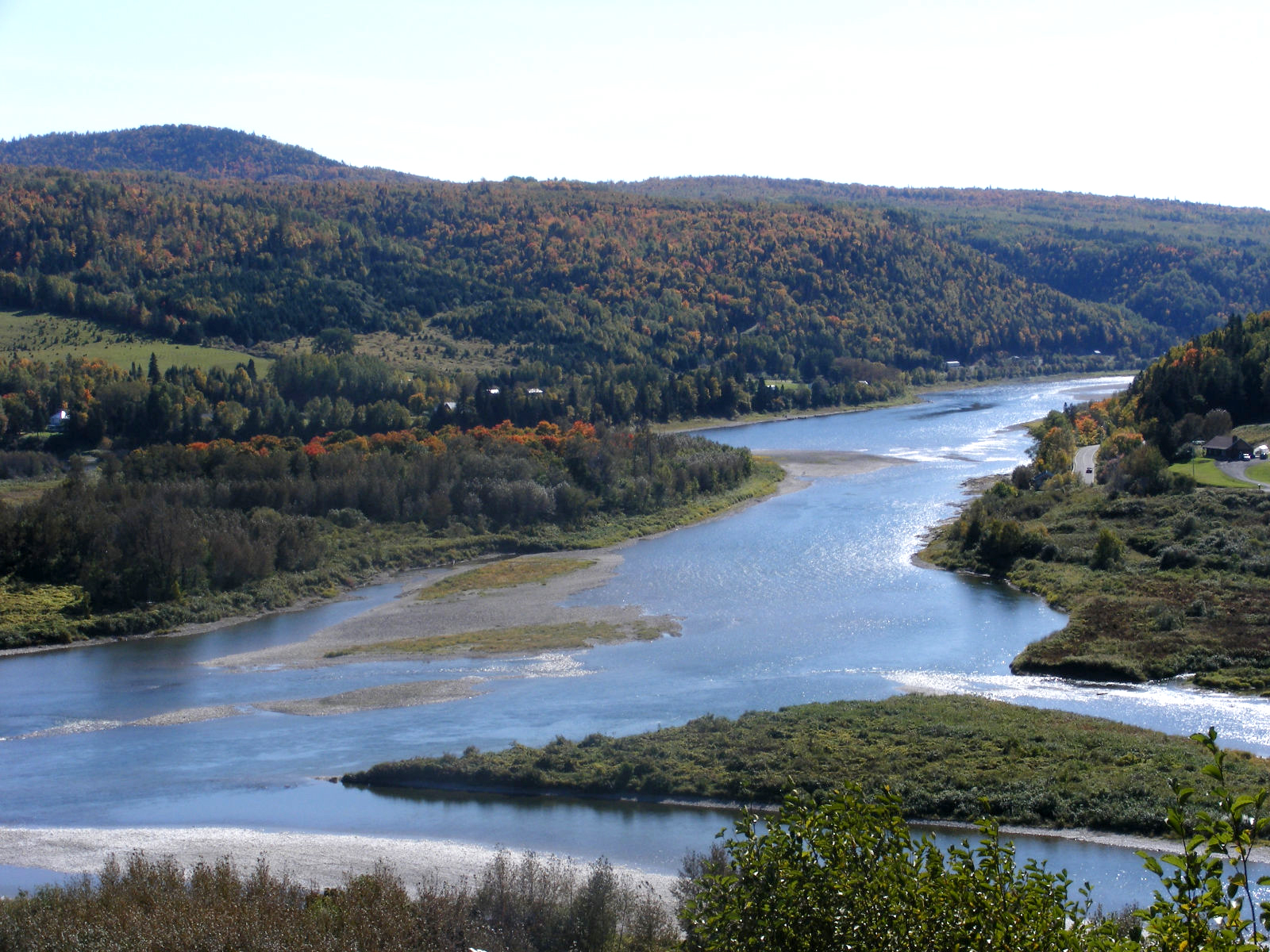
- Landscape in the Matapedia Valley at the junction of the Matapedia and Restigouche rivers

- Location within Quebec
- Length: 375 km (233 mi) southwest

Geology
- Type: river valley

Geography
- Location: Gaspésie–Îles-de-la-Madeleine, Quebec, Canada
- Population centers: Amqui
- Coordinates: 48°30′N 67°20′W
- Traversed by: Route 132
- Interactive map of Matapedia Valley

The Matapedia Valley (French: vallée de la Matapédia, pronounced [vale də la matapedja]) was formed by the Chic-Choc Mountains of eastern Québec. Its name is derived from the river that traverses the valley, as well as the lake that lies in its center. It is situated in the southwest of the Gaspé Peninsula and stretches 375 km (233 mi).

The land is primarily made up of forest and agriculture, and is home to more than 20,000 inhabitants in some thirty municipalities. Most of them are concentrated along the main avenue of communication, Route 132. The city of Amqui is the seat of the RCM and is home to 6,261 people.

The Mi'kmaq people first developed the valley around 500 BCE. French-Canadian settlement began in 1833 when Pierre Brochu moved to Lake Matapedia along Kempt Road. Settlers began flocking to the land in the late nineteenth century with the development of land clearing, agriculture, and the logging industry.

== Toponymy ==
The name Matapedia may derive from the Mi'kmaq word matapegiag, meaning "river junction", from the parts mata (junction) and pegiag (river), referring to the Matapédia River that crosses the town just before its confluence with the Restigouche River. Silas Tertius Rand, a noted linguist and source from the late nineteenth century, indicated that the Mi'kmaq named the area Magabegeak which means "roughly flowing". It has also been spelled many different ways over time such as Matapediach, Madapeguia, Matapeguia, Matapediac, Matakpediack, Madapeguia, Metapedia, or Matapediac.

== Geography ==
=== Location ===
Map of Matapedia Valley

At the western extremity of the valley is the village of Sainte-Angèle-de-Mérici, Quebec. From north to south, it runs a length of 375 km (233 mi) until it reaches the Restigouche River to the east, which borders New Brunswick. The village of Matapédia, Quebec lies on the valley's eastern tip.

The valley is situated south of the Saint Lawrence River in the administrative regions of Bas-Saint-Laurent and Gaspésie–Îles-de-la-Madeleine. This makes it the only region in the Gaspé Peninsula that does not border the sea.

=== Topography ===
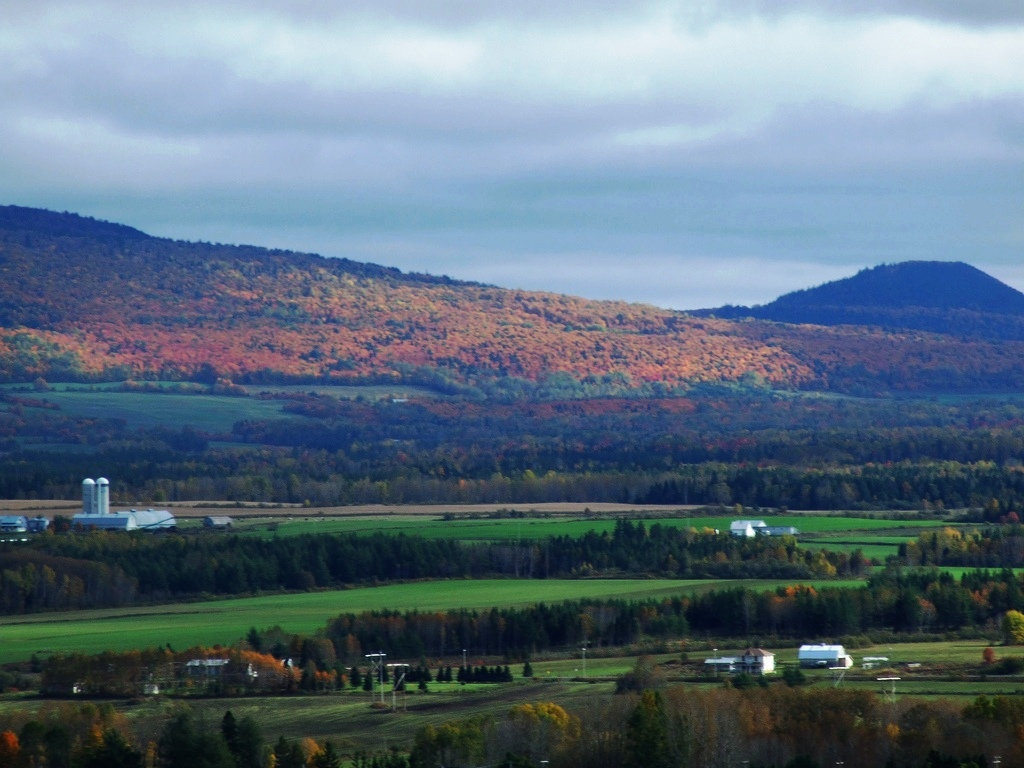
The Chic-Chocs surround Matapédia Valley.

The Matapedia Valley is dug into the Chic-Choc mountain range, which is situated at the northern extremity of the Appalachians. It has two main bodies of water: Lake Matapedia, which extends from Sayabec to Amqui, and Lac-au-Saumon, situated in a town by the same name.

The valley reaches from the St. Lawrence River to Chaleur Bay. The northwest region of the valley is rather flat and surrounded by small mounts that do not exceed 400 metres (1,300 ft). More towards the center of the valley, near St. Cleophas and St. Irène, the peaks reach an altitude of 800 metres (2,600 ft), one of which is the Val-d'Irène ski resort (685 metres (2,247 ft)). The southeastern area of the valley is more rugged and steep, with summits reaching about 600 metres (2,000 ft). At the other extreme, Lake Matapedia rests at an altitude of 158 metres (518 ft).

The Matapedia Valley includes 20,000 hectares (77 sq mi) of land dedicated to agriculture and 500,000 hectares (1,900 sq mi) of forest divided equally between the public and private sectors. The main agricultural municipalities of the valley are Amqui, Causapscal, Saint-Damase, Val-Brillant, and Saint-Léon-le-Grand.

The floor of the valley belongs to the Appalachian rock formation. It is composed primarily of Gaspé feldspar sandstone, Gaspé limestone, and a mixture of sandstone, mudstone, and limestone from the Chaleur Group that date back to the Devonian and Silurian periods.

=== Hydrography ===
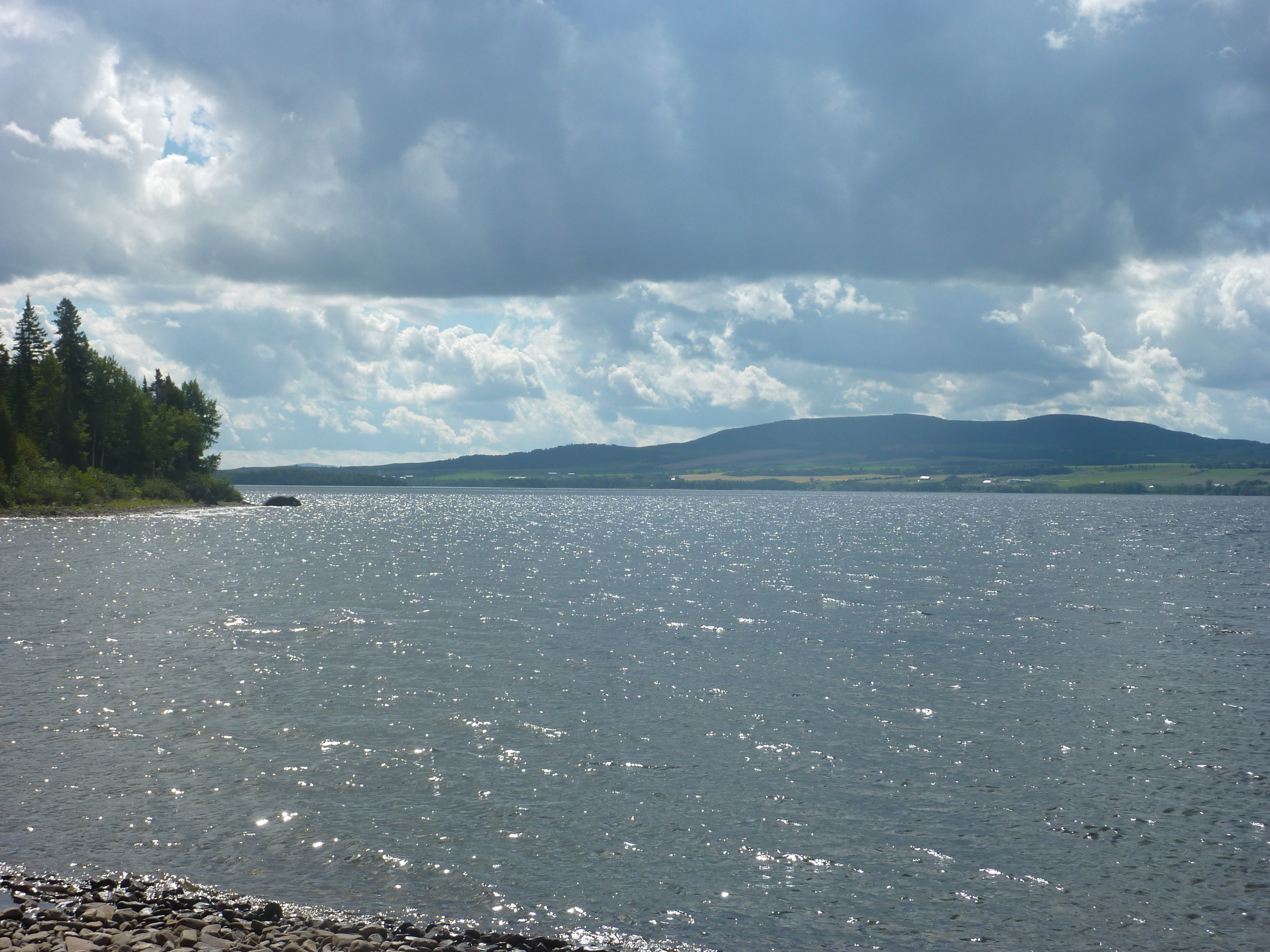
Lake Matapédia

The territory of the Matapedia Valley is drained through the Matapedia River, which has a watershed area of 3,824 square kilometres (1,476 sq mi). It is known for its Atlantic salmon fishing. Additionally, the valley has more than 200 lakes, the most significant of which is Lake Matapedia, with an area of 38 square kilometres (15 sq mi). The valley's second largest lake is Lac-au-Saumon, which is fed into and drained by the Matapedia River.

=== Demographics ===
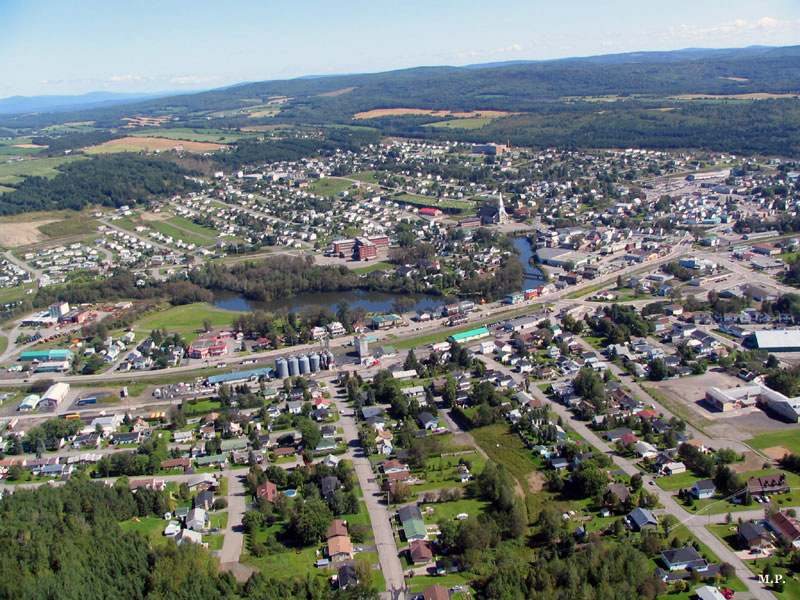
Amqui, the biggest city in the valley

Demographic evolution
Year	Population
1895	8,000
1922	30,000
2006	20,000

The geographic territory of the valley comprises the regional county municipalities of La Mitis, La Matapédia and Avignon, which cover thirty municipalities. Important economic centers include Amqui, Causapscal and Sayabec. The valley is currently home to more than 20,000 inhabitants. Its population density is much higher along Lake Matapedia and the Matapedia River than the more remote areas of the valley. Indeed, along the lake and river, the population density is 12 inhabitants per km^{2} while in the valley's uplands, it is 5.0/km^{2} (13/sq mi). The unincorporated territories of the valley are nearly uninhabited.

Municipality	Population	Year of incorporation
La Mitis RCM
Sainte-Angèle-de-Mérici	1,081	1989
Padoue	283	1911
Sainte-Jeanne-d'Arc-de-la-Mitis	322	1922
La Rédemption	219	1968
La Matanie RCM
Sainte-Paule	322	1922
La Matapédia RCM
Saint-Damase	429	1885
Saint-Noël	515	1906
Saint-Moïse	661	1878
Sayabec	1,953	1982
Saint-Cléophas	450	1921
Val-Brillant	1,003	1986
Sainte-Irène	308	1953
Amqui	6,395	1991
Saint-Alexandre-des-Lacs	275	1965
Saint-Tharcisius	510	1937
Saint-Vianney	520	1926
Lac-au-Saumon	1,517	1997
Saint-Léon-le-Grand	1,073	1903
Saint-Zénon-du-Lac-Humqui	427	1920
Albertville	350	1950
Causapscal	2,556	1997
Sainte-Florence	458	1911
Sainte-Marguerite-Marie	242	1957
Avignon RCM
Saint-André-de-Restigouche	220	1855
Ristigouche-Sud-Est	176	1906
Saint-François-d'Assise	795	1926
Saint-Alexis-de-Matapédia	660	1855
L'Ascension-de-Patapédia	221	1968
Matapédia	758	1905

=== Transportation ===
Route 132 sign

The main axis of communication is Highway 132 which runs northwest to southeast. The majority of the population in this area is located along this highway. Additionally, there are two provincial highways that snake through the valley which are perpendicular to the St. Lawrence River Hwy 297, which goes from Saint-Moïse to Baie-des-Sables, and Hwy 195, which runs from Amqui to Matane.

A railroad that crosses the valley on the same axis as the 132 defines the eastern extremity of the valley, which allows access to New Brunswick and the Gaspé peninsula. There are two trains that service the valley: the Ocean and the Montreal – Gaspé train, both of which are owned by Via Rail and are combined from Matapédia onwards.

== History ==
=== Precolonial times ===
The Mi'kmaq and Maliseet lived in the territory of the Matapedia Valley before the arrival of Europeans in North America. They primarily lived around Chaleur Bay, but they traveled along the Matapedia River to fish at the mouth of the Mitis River on the St. Lawrence River. Around 500 BC, the Mi'kmaq began to settle further into the valley. On 26 May 1694, the governor of New France, Louis de Buade de Frontenac, granted the seigneurie of Lake Matapeguia, which covers the area around the eponymous lake, to Charles-Nicolas-Joseph D'Amours de Louviers. In violation of laws of the time which required a lord to develop his land, D'Amours never even set foot in the valley, nor did he send anyone. He died in 1728 without bequeathing the land to anyone. This is why, at the time of the construction of Kempt Road in 1830, there was no mention of this land, and why everyone believed that they were on the Crown's land. However, Marie-Françoise Damours de Louvières inherited part of the seigneurie, and went on to wed Jean-Baptiste de Remond Moyse, who willed his share of the land to their son Jean-Baptiste Raymond. After some financial trouble, the latter sold the entire seigneurie for 700 pounds to Patrick Langan in 1796. The region remained inhabited by the Mi'kmaqs until 1818, when several Scottish families built houses in Métis, and many loyalists settled on the Restigouche River. These two locations define the limits of the Matapedia Valley.

=== Early European exploration ===
For settlers, the inner territory of the valley remained unexplored. In 1815, the Lower Canada governor Sir James Kempt sent explorer Joseph Bouchette to the territory of the Matapedia Valley to see to the construction of Kempt Road. This was done in order to connect Métis on the shores of the Saint Lawrence River to Pointe-à-la-Croix near Chaleur Bay. In Topographie du Bas-Canada, Joseph Bouchette wrote that the Matapedia Valley is a land conducive to becoming an agricultural center of importance.

Shortly before this time, the War of 1812 demonstrated that Canada was vulnerable to attacks from the United States and the need to connect Upper and Lower Canada to the maritime colonies. Residents of Gaspesia had been demanding means of communication with the urban centre for some time, as outside of navigation season, they were cut off from the world by ice.

At that time, the postal service operated via a rudimentary path from the Kamouraska seigneurie to Lake Témiscouata, then following the Madawaska and St. John rivers. The basic path in the Lake Témiscouata area became increasingly inefficient for the region's growing needs, so the idea for a new road via Lake Matapedia was conceived. To be named Kempt Road, the route not only served to connect the coast of the Saint Lawrence coast and Chaleur Bay, it was also to be used for military purposes.

In 1824, under the command of Governor James Kempt, James Crawford picked up Joseph Bouchette's torch as explorer of the valley's interior and was tasked with finding a suitable path for the important road. In his report, submitted 4 May 1824, he indicates that even if the distance through Lake Matapedia from Métis was longer, it was easier. However, he goes on to note that the terrain east of Lake Matapedia would be more difficult, even along the river, due to the steepness of the river banks. In his report, Crawford also mentions that there was no pedestrian path in the Matapedia Valley, and that it would be beneficial to the region's population to construct one. Kempt's successor, Aylmer, put the project in place six years later. By 1845, only the western section from Métis to Lake Matapedia was completed.

=== The first settlers ===
The first European resident in the Matapedia Valley was French-Canadian Pierre Brochu (1795-1871), who in 1833 settled in present-day Sayabec at the junction of Lake Matapedia and Saint-Pierre river. He assumed the position of guardian along Kempt Road for couriers and travelers. Lake Matapedia was renamed Brochu's Lake until 1871, the year in which Pierre Brochu died.

Among the other guardians were Malcolm Fraser, who settled in present-day Saint-Moïse, Georges Brochu, son of Pierre Brochu, who settled at the outflow of Lake Matapedia near present-day Amqui, Georges Lebel who settled in Lac-au-Saumon, Jonathan Noble who took up residence on the site where the Causapscal church is today, and in 1849, Thomas Evans on the Assemetquaghan stream in present-day Routhierville. In addition to these guardians, Noble's son settled near his father in The Forks, known today as the Forks Park in Causapscal, and Ferdinand Duval who made his home in Lac-au-Saumon. During this time, Acadians from Prince Edward Island and the Magdalen Islands also started coming to the area and clearing land by settling in the Matapedia Valley, especially in its west.

In the 1880s, the valley had about 1,700 inhabitants and, at the dawn of the twentieth century, it had grown to 8,000.

=== The Kempt and Matapedia Roads ===
The state of Kempt Road remained deplorable until the outbreak of the American Civil War, which generated a big enough concern for the government to finally invest the sums necessary for the establishment of a road worthy of the name. The original route had been changed so that the path starts at Sainte-Flavie instead of Métis. Starting in 1860, the Matapedia Road had begun replacing Kempt Road. Finally, in 1867, Matapedia Road was completed.

=== The Intercolonial Railway ===
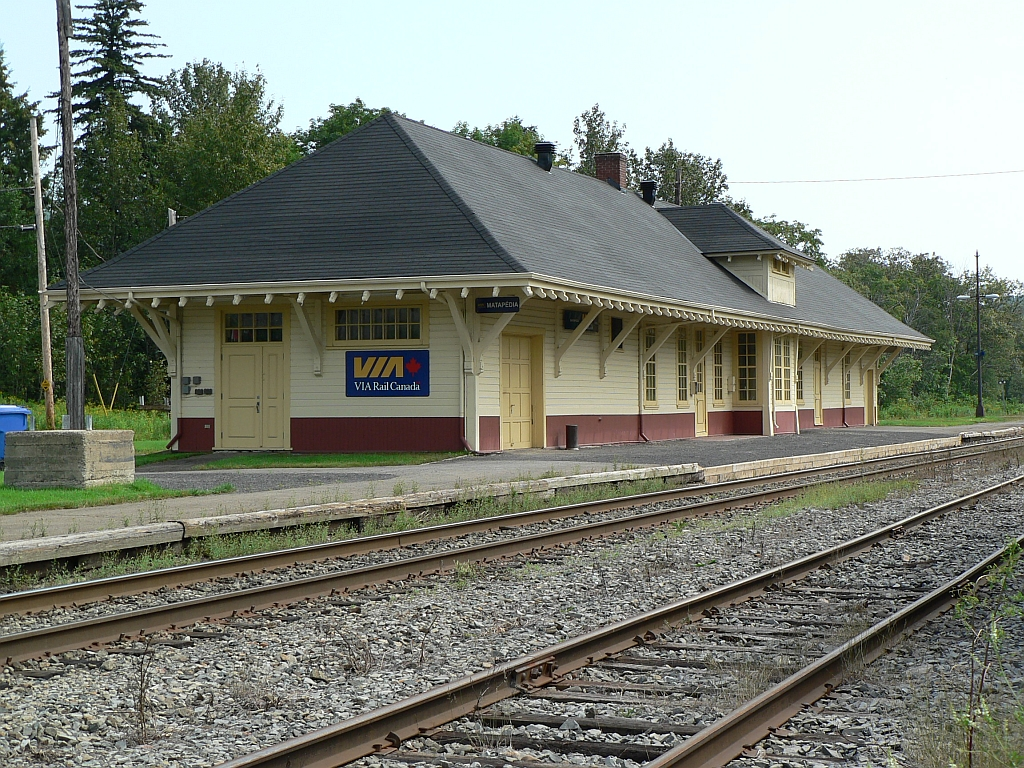
Railway station in Matapedia

At a Quebec conference in October 1864, the decision was made to join the Intercolonial Railway to the Grand Trunk at Rivière-du-Loup. In 1871, the construction of a railroad crossing the valley had begun, an undertaking that had been completed in 1876. Paired with the Matapedia and Kempt roads, this railway acted as a catalyst for demographic development in the valley. Indeed, between 1900 and 1940, the population of the valley rose to over thirty thousand inhabitants.

=== Parish development ===
In the west of the valley, along the Mitis River on the Matapedia Road, was the first parish to be canonically erected in 1868: Sainte-Angèle-de-Merici. Inhabited since 1870 and canonically erected in 1873, the Saint-Moïse parish is the oldest in the interior of the valley. At its eastern extremity lies the Saint-Alexis-de-Matapédia parish, which was founded in 1870 by twelve Acadians. In 1860, missionary Georges-Antoine Belcourt was granted a concession for poor families in his parish, prompting him to colonize the Matapedia Valley. Quebecers were generous to the newcomers, and with the financial and material assistance, and with financial and material support, the region was quick to prosper. They were later joined by another 300 Acadians from Prince Edward Island and the Magdalen Islands.

The Saint-Alexis-de-Matapédia parish was followed by the neighboring parishes of L'Ascension-de-Patapédia, Matapédia, Saint-André-de-Restigouche and Saint-François-d'Assise, which were also established by the Acadians. The first chapel of Saint-Damase was built in 1879 and was canonically erected in 1884. In the heart of the Seignory of Lac-Matapédia was the Val-Brillant parish, which was canonically erected in 1889, and counted more than 2,200 inhabitants by the 1920s. It was named in honor of Pierre Brillant who is considered the "father of the Valley." Also in 1889, the Amqui parish was canonically erected on the eastern tip of Lake Matapedia and had a population greater than 3,000 by 1920. The Sayabec parish, which was canonically erected in 1896, developed rapidly and numbered more than five hundred families in the 1920s. During the same year, the Causapscal parish was canonically erected and included more than 2,000 people in the 1920s. The Matapédia parish was canonically erected in 1905. Its erection was delayed due to its inhabitants being primarily Scottish Protestants. In 1907, the parishes of Saint-Léon-le-Grand and Lac-au-Saumon split off from the Amqui parish. Lac-au-Saumon was mainly developed by the Acadians. In 1910, it was the Sainte-Florence parish's turn to be canonically erected, and in just ten years, it had already attracted around 700 residents. One year later, the Saint-André-de-Restigouche parish sees its first resident parish priest. Finally, the parish of La Rédemption was created in 1936 as part of a government stimulation plan following the Great Depression.

=== Economic development ===
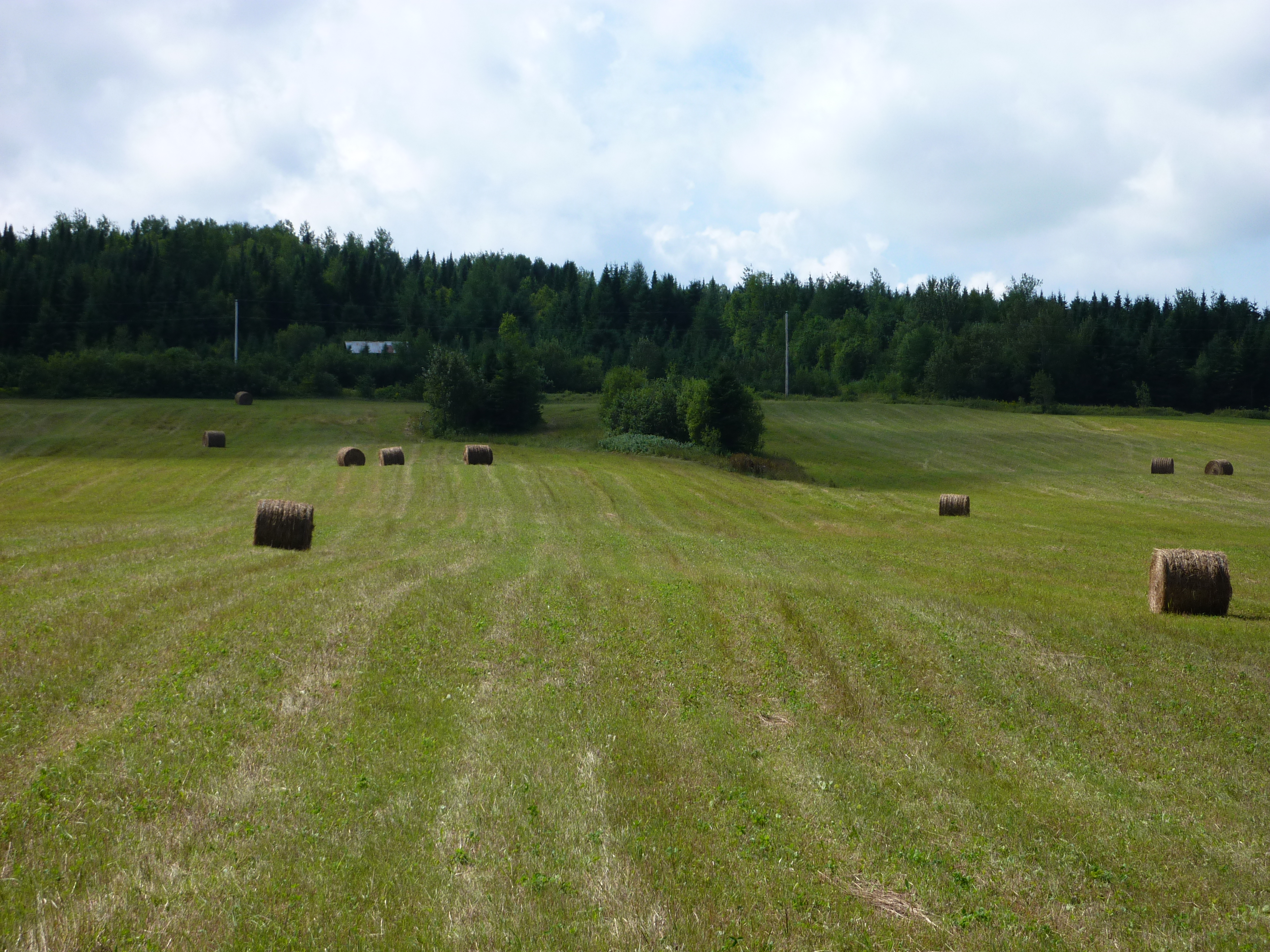
Fields in Saint-Alexandre-des-Lacs

The logging industry was the primary pull factor for settlers in the valley. The development of agriculture allowed for permanent colonies and the creation of Catholic parishes. Logging companies such as John Fenderson Lumber, Price Bros., and Brown Corporation built the industrial framework necessary for the growth of the valley's villages.

== Culture ==
Throughout its history, Matapedia Valley has shared much of its culture with the Acadians. Additionally, one can observe the Acadian flag in many municipalities in the area, notably Amqui, Causapscal, and Lac-au-Saumon.

== Tourism ==
The Matapedia Valley is a touristic sub-region of Gaspésie. The valley is renowned for its outdoor activities, including skiing, hunting, and fishing. Salmon fishing is popular on Matapedia River, and Val-d'Irène offers 26 trails for snowboarders and downhill skiers in addition to many snowshoeing trails. For hikers, the International Appalachian Trail cuts through the valley. Additionally, the Seignory of Lac-Matapédia regional park provides many trails through the Chic-Chocs.

== See also ==
- Avignon
- Bas-Saint-Laurent
- Gaspé Peninsula
- La Matapédia
- La Mitis
- Lac-Matapédia, Quebec
- Lake Matapedia
- Matapedia River
