= Lac-Matapédia =

- Unorganized territory
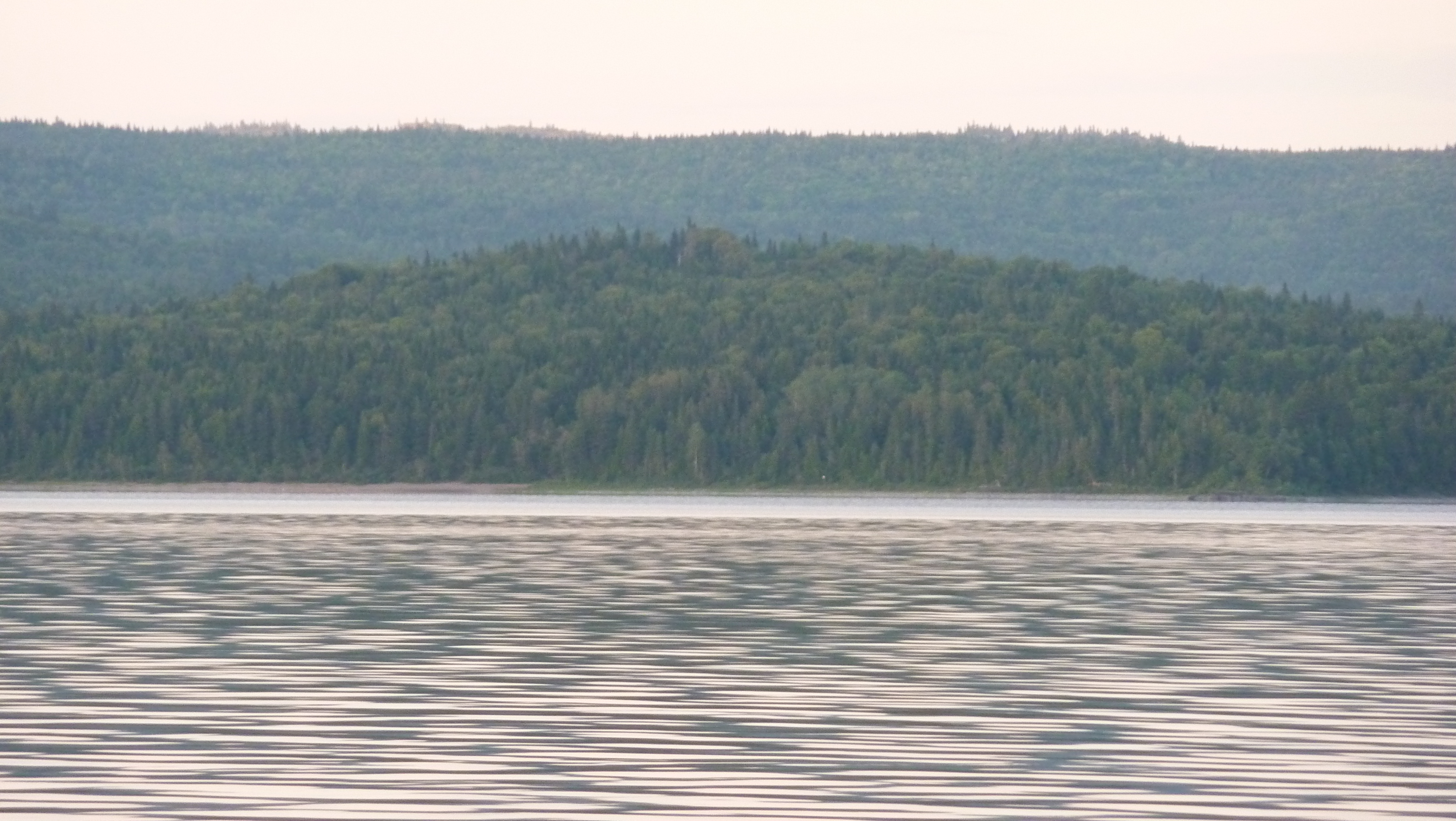
- North shore of Lake Matapedia

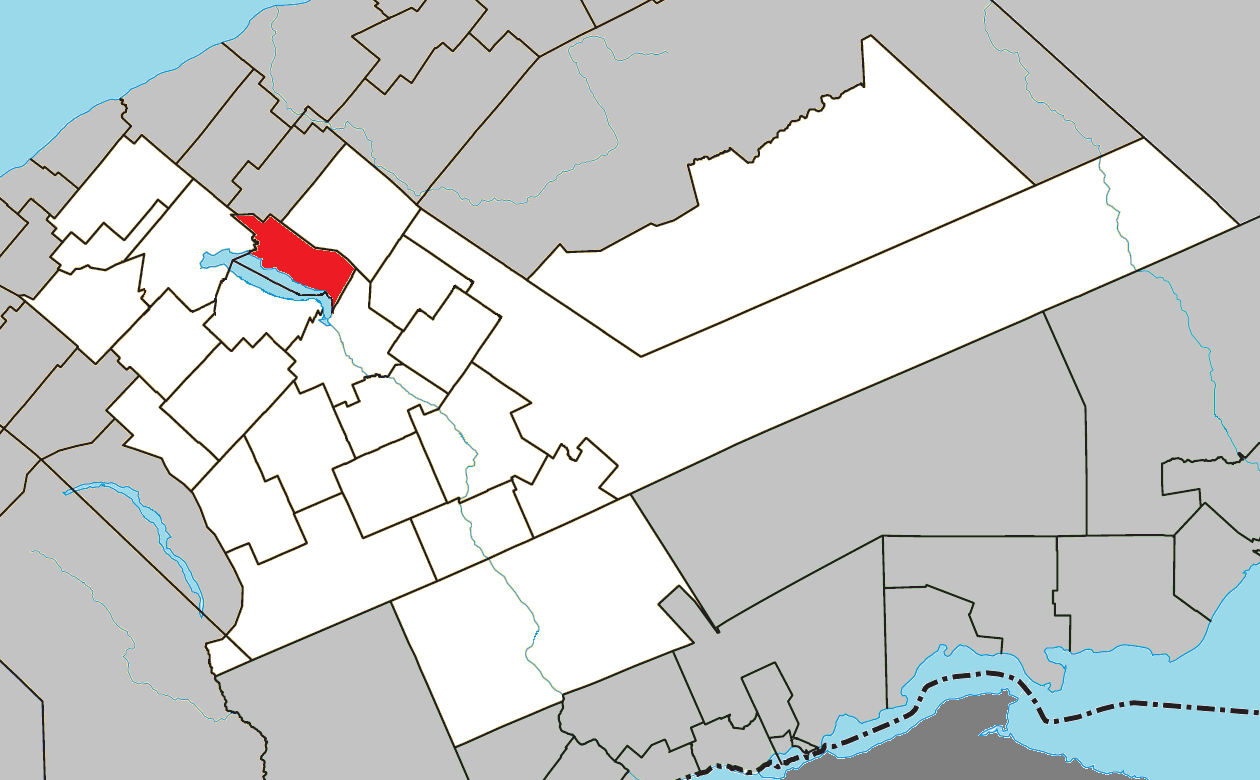
- Location within La Matapédia RCM

- Location in eastern Quebec
- Coordinates: 48°33′N 67°34′W
- Country: Canada
- Province: Quebec
- Region: Bas-Saint-Laurent
- RCM: La Matapédia
- Constituted: unspecified

Government
  - Fed. riding: Rimouski-Neigette—Mitis—Matapédia—Les Basques
  - Prov. riding: Matane-Matapédia-Mitis

Area
  - Total: 83.34 km^{2} (32.18 sq mi)
  - Land: 71.01 km^{2} (27.42 sq mi)

Population (2021)
  - Total: 10
  - Density: 0.1/km^{2} (0.26/sq mi)
  - Change 2016-21: ▲100%
  - Dwellings: 18
- Time zone: UTC−05:00 (EST)
  - Summer (DST): UTC−04:00 (EDT)
- Highways: No major routes

Lac-Matapédia (French pronunciation: [lak matapedja]) is an unorganized territory in the Bas-Saint-Laurent region of Quebec, Canada. It is named after and located on the northern shores of Lake Matapedia in the Matapédia Valley.

The territory is entirely within the Seigneurie-du-Lac-Matapédia Regional Park. It is also home to a small protected area, Lac-Matapédia Forest Refuge (304 hectares (750 acres)) that was established in 2008 to protect three populations of the calypso orchid (Calypso bulbosa), a plant designated as threatened or vulnerable in Quebec.

In the first half of the 20th century, the area was logged, which continued until 1964 when the territory was bought by the provincial government. In 1988, forestry operations restarted and recreational development of the territory began to be planned. The agreement for the operation of the regional park was signed in 2001, followed by completion of the management plan in 2003.

== Demographics ==
Historical census populations – Lac-Matapédia

Year	Pop.	±%
1981	0	—
1986	0	0.00%
1991	0	0.00%
1996	4	—
2001	0	−100.0%

Year	Pop.	±%
2006	10	—
2011	5	−50.0%
2016	5	+0.0%
2021	10	+100.0%

Source: Statistics Canada

Private dwellings occupied by usual residents (2021): 8 (total dwellings: 18)

== Gallery ==
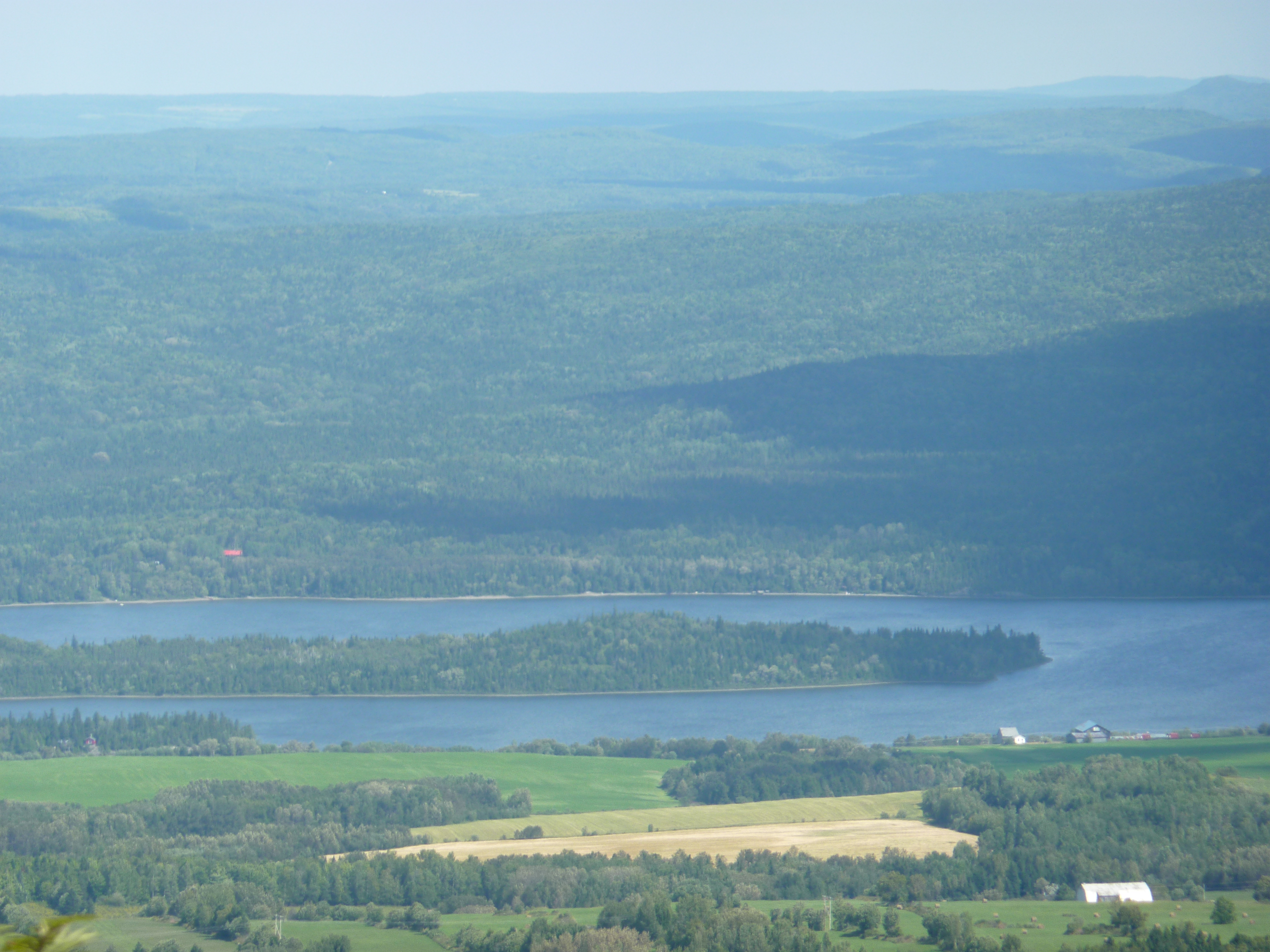
View of the territory from across Lake Matapedia

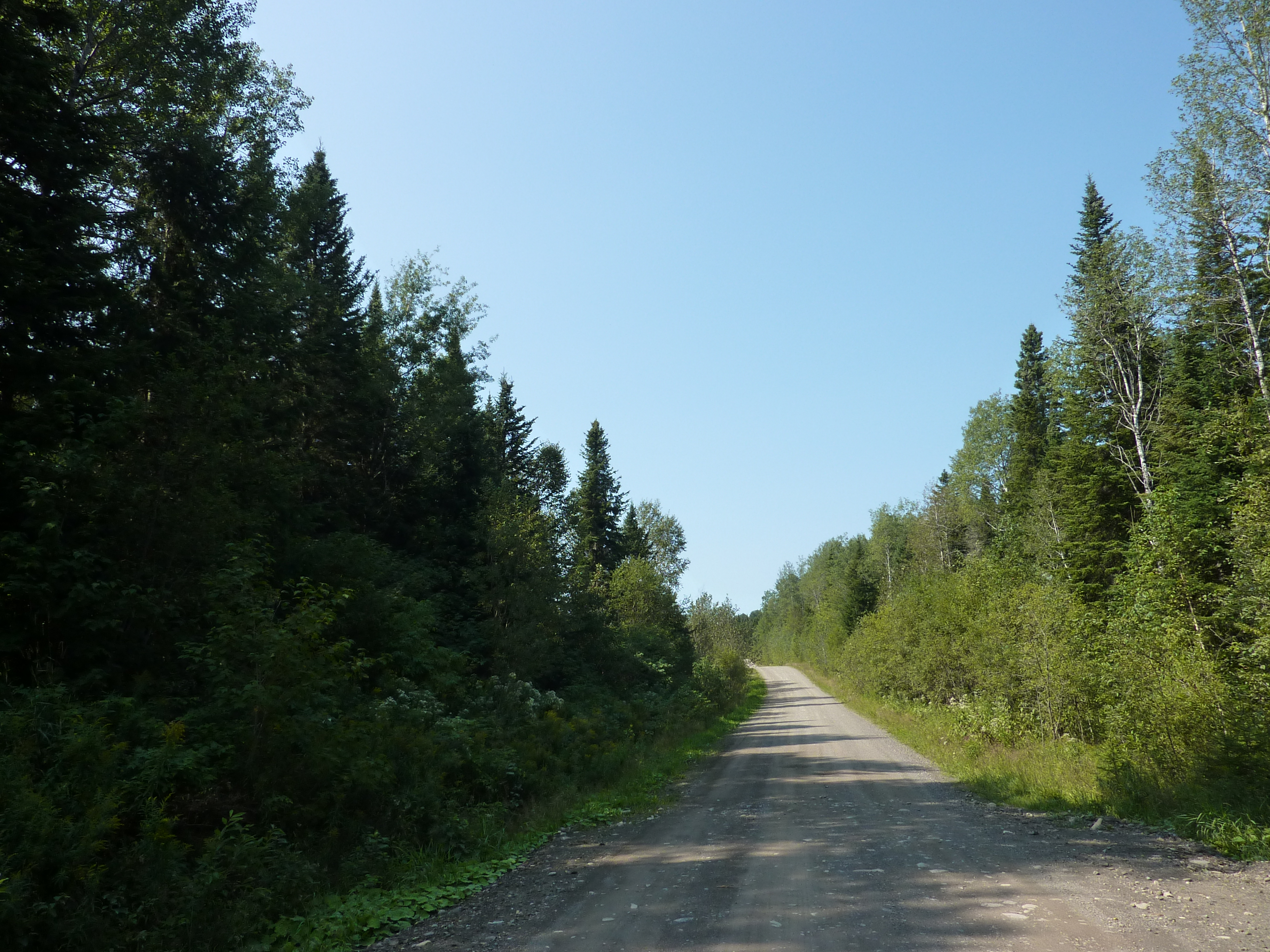
Main road of the territory

== See also ==
- List of unorganized territories in Quebec
