= Sayabec River =

River of Bas-Saint-Laurent, Quebec, Canada

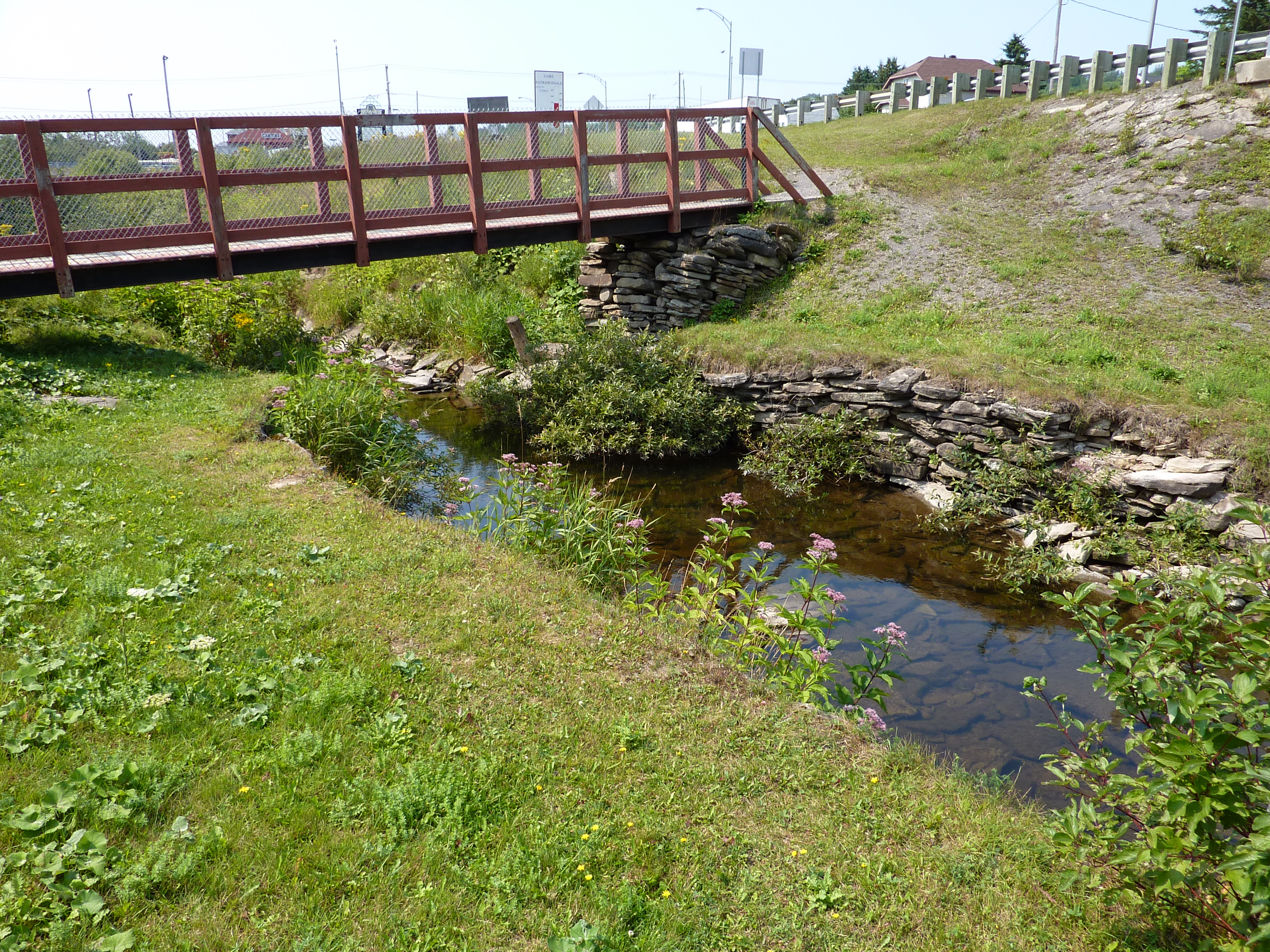
- Sayabec River in the village of Sayabec

- Location within Quebec
- Native name: Rivière Sayabec (French)

Location
- Country: Canada
- Province: Quebec
- Region: Bas-Saint-Laurent
- MRC: La Matapédia Regional County Municipality

The Sayabec River is a fresh stream flowing through the municipality of Sayabec, in the La Matapédia Regional County Municipality (MRC), in the region of Bas-Saint-Laurent.

== Toponymy ==
The toponym “Sayabec River” was formalized on 5 December 1968 at the Commission de toponymie du Québec.

== See also ==
- List of rivers of Quebec
