= Val-Brillant =

- Municipality
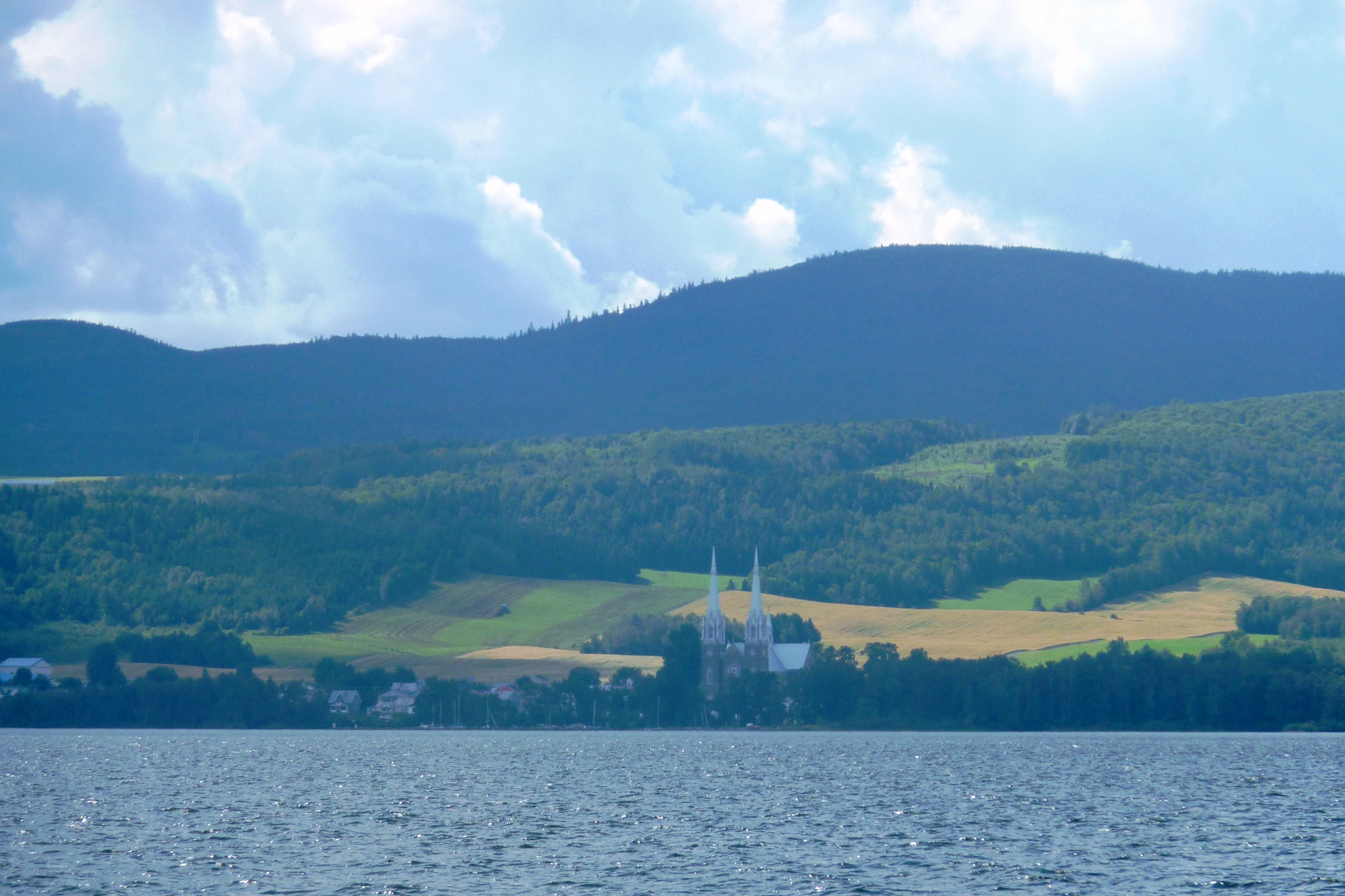

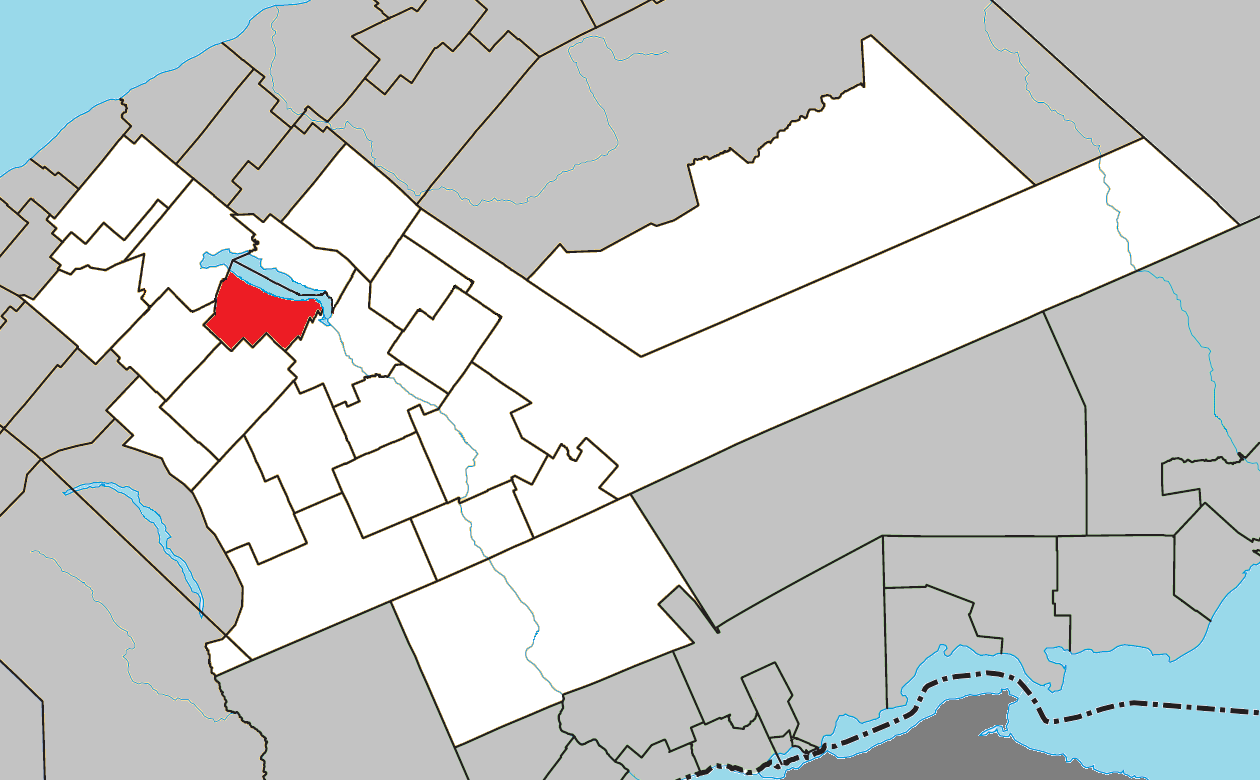
- Location within La Matapédia RCM

- Location in eastern Quebec
- Coordinates: 48°32′N 67°33′W
- Country: Canada
- Province: Quebec
- Region: Bas-Saint-Laurent
- RCM: La Matapédia
- Settled: 1872
- Constituted: December 20, 1986

Government
  - Mayor: Maxime Tremblay
  - Fed. riding: Rimouski-Neigette—Mitis—Matapédia—Les Basques
  - Prov. riding: Matane-Matapédia-Mitis

Area
  - Total: 91.71 km^{2} (35.41 sq mi)
  - Land: 77.90 km^{2} (30.08 sq mi)

Population (2021)
  - Total: 899
  - Density: 11.5/km^{2} (30/sq mi)
  - Change 2016-21: ▼3.0%
  - Dwellings: 504
- Time zone: UTC−5 (EST)
  - Summer (DST): UTC−4 (EDT)
- Postal code(s): G0J 3L0
- Area codes: 418, 581
- Highways: R-132
- Website: municipalites-du-quebec.com/val-brillant/index.php

Val-Brillant (French pronunciation: [val bʁijɑ̃]) is a municipality in eastern Quebec, Canada, at the base of the Gaspé peninsula. On the southern shores of the Lake Matapedia, Val-Brillant is part of the Matapédia Valley.

The place was previously known by many other names: Lac-Matapédia; Brochu or Brouché, followed by Lac-à-Brochu until 1871 (after Pierre Brochu (1795–1871), the first settler in the valley in what is now Sayabec); McGowe (after an engineer working on the railroad); Cedar Hall from 1876 to 1912 (referring to the large hangar built from pieces of cedar that served as a coal shed for the railway); and Saint-Pierre-du-Lac (in honour of Pierre Brillant (1852–1911), missionary in the Matapedia Valley from 1881 to 1889 and parish priest from 1889 to his death).

== History ==
Originally Mi'kmaq territory, the area was granted as a seignory by Louis de Buade de Frontenac to Charles-Nicolas-Joseph D’Amours in 1694. D'Amours died in 1728 and none of his descendants claimed the rights to the seignory. So it remained a remote and undeveloped land until the 19th century. In 1830 construction began on the Kempt Road, a strategic military road between Quebec and the Maritimes, completed in 1833. An inn serving postilions and travellers along the road operated there from 1867 to 1876.

European settlement began in 1872 during the construction of the Intercolonial Railway. Supervisor Engineer Peter Grant built for himself a house that also accommodated the railway employees for many years. In 1876, the railway was completed and on July 1 the first train passed through. In 1881, the post office opened, and two years later, the Mission of Saint-Pierre-du-Lac was established, named in honour of Pierre Brillant. In 1890, the Parish Municipality of Saint-Pierre-du-Lac was founded. By 1898, it had a population of 1600 people.

In 1915, the main population centre separated from the parish municipality and was incorporated as the Village Municipality of Saint-Pierre-du-Lac, but renamed one year later to Val-Brillant.

In 1986, the Village Municipality of Val-Brillant and the Parish Municipality of Saint-Pierre-du-Lac were rejoined in the current Municipality of Val-Brillant.

== Demographics ==
Canada census – Val-Brillant community profile

	2021	2016	2011
Population	899 (-3.0% from 2016)	927 (-2.9% from 2011)	955 (-4.8% from 2006)
Land area	77.90 km^{2} (30.08 sq mi)	78.04 km^{2} (30.13 sq mi)	77.60 km^{2} (29.96 sq mi)
Population density	11.5/km^{2} (30/sq mi)	11.9/km^{2} (31/sq mi)	12.3/km^{2} (32/sq mi)
Median age	47.6 (M: 46.8, F: 48.0)	49.5 (M: 48.5, F: 51.5)	48.7 (M: 47.2, F: 49.8)
Private dwellings	504 (total) 419 (occupied)	497 (total)	501 (total)
Median household income	$66,000	$50,688	$54,478

References: 2021 2016 2011

Historical census populations – Val-Brillant, Quebec

Year	Pop.	±%
1991	1,024	—
1996	1,040	+1.6%
2001	997	−4.1%
2006	1,003	+0.6%

Year	Pop.	±%
2011	955	−4.8%
2016	927	−2.9%
2021	899	−3.0%

Source: Statistics Canada

Mother tongue:

- English as first language: 0%
- French as first language: 99.4%
- English and French as first languages: 0%
- Other as first language: 0.6%

== Government ==
Municipal council:

- Mayor: Jacques Pelletier
- Councillors: Stevens Pelletier, Maxime Tremblay, Geneviève Leblanc, Johanne D'Amours, Richard Turgeon, Denis Couture

List of former mayors:

- Marc-André Turcotte (2001–2005)
- Marc Bélanger (2005–2009)
- Donald Malenfant (2009–2013)
- Jacques Pelletier (2013–present)

== See also ==
- List of municipalities in Quebec
