= Saint-Vianney =

- Municipality
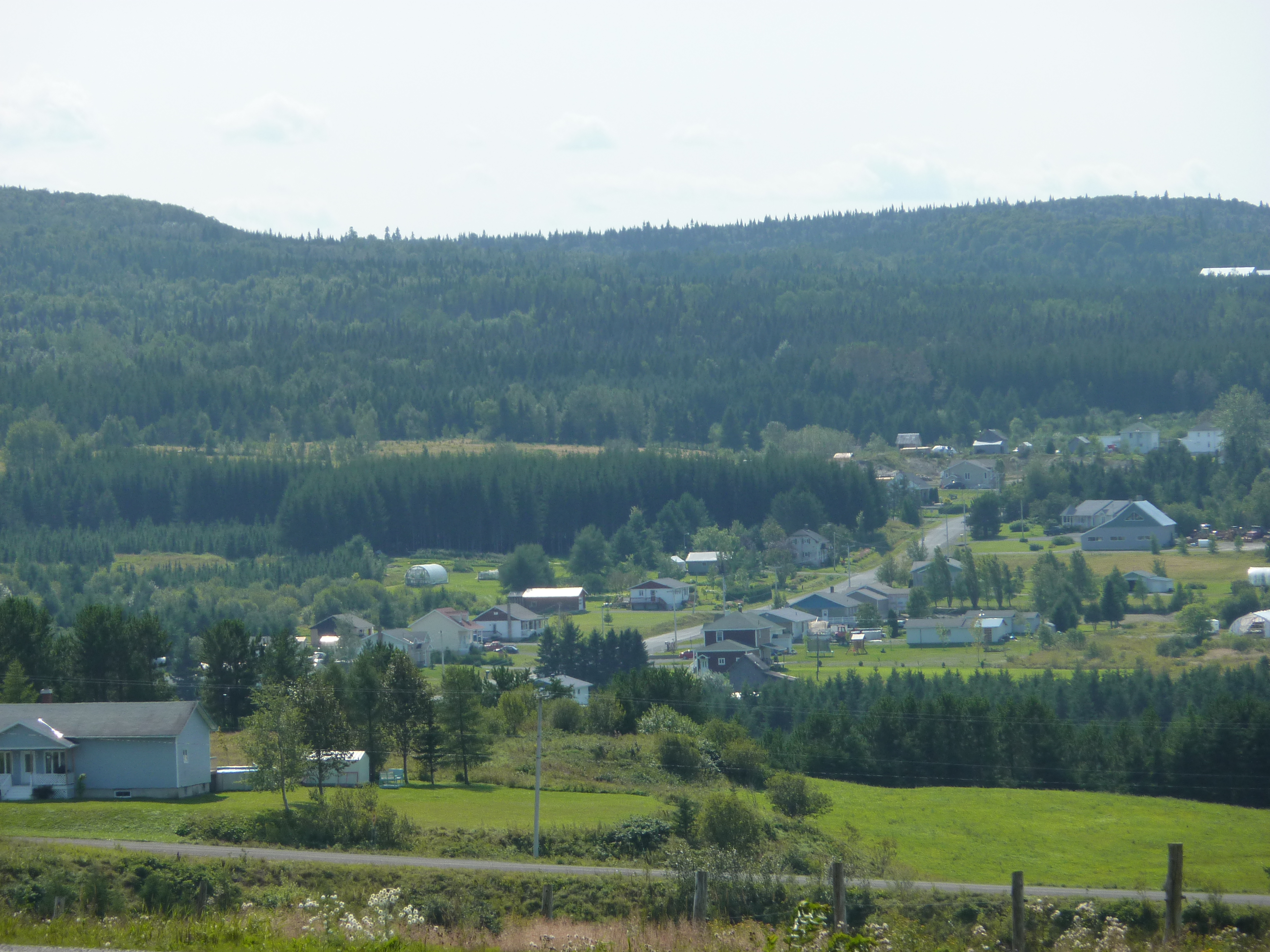

- Coat of arms

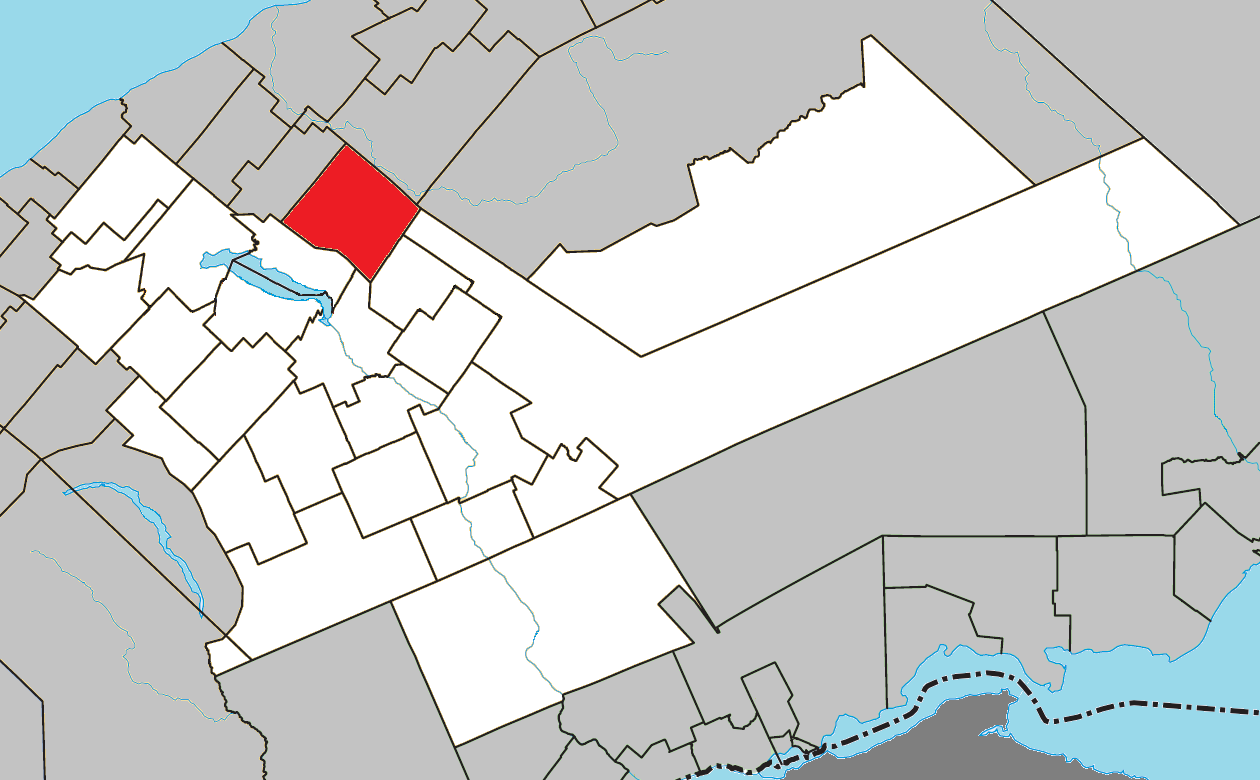
- Location within La Matapédia RCM

- Location in eastern Quebec
- Coordinates: 48°38′N 67°25′W
- Country: Canada
- Province: Quebec
- Region: Bas-Saint-Laurent
- RCM: La Matapédia
- Settled: 1918
- Constituted: August 27, 1926

Government
  - Mayor: Georges Guénard
  - Fed. riding: Rimouski-Neigette—Mitis—Matapédia—Les Basques
  - Prov. riding: Matane-Matapédia-Mitis

Area
  - Total: 146.18 km^{2} (56.44 sq mi)
  - Land: 145.60 km^{2} (56.22 sq mi)

Population (2021)
  - Total: 446
  - Density: 3.1/km^{2} (8.0/sq mi)
  - Change 2016-21: ▲1.1%
  - Dwellings: 245
- Time zone: UTC−5 (EST)
  - Summer (DST): UTC−4 (EDT)
- Postal code(s): G0J 3J0
- Area codes: 418, 581
- Highways: R-195
- Website: www.saint-vianney.net

Saint-Vianney (French pronunciation: [sɛ̃ vjanɛ]) is a municipality in the Canadian province of Quebec, located in La Matapédia Regional Council Municipality. It was known as Saint-Jean-Baptiste-Vianney until 1988.

== History ==
The first settlers arrived in 1918. In 1920, several Franco-American families settled in the territory. The Langis mission was founded in 1921. Its name recalls that of the geographic township of Langis of which Saint-Vianney is a part, named in honor of Louis-Jacques Langis who was parish priest of L'Isle-Verte and canon in the cathedral of Rimouski. The post office was opened on April 12, 1922. The first chapel was inaugurated on December 24, 1922. The municipality was officially founded on August 27, 1926, under the name Saint-Jean-Baptise-Vianney. The first mayor, Oscar Poulin, was elected on October 20, 1926. In 1988, Saint-Jean-Baptiste-Vianney changed its name to the current Saint-Vianney.

== Demographics ==
Canada census – Saint-Vianney community profile

	2021	2016	2011
Population	446 (+1.1% from 2016)	441 (-7.5% from 2011)	477 (-2.5% from 2006)
Land area	145.60 km^{2} (56.22 sq mi)	145.99 km^{2} (56.37 sq mi)	146.01 km^{2} (56.37 sq mi)
Population density	3.1/km^{2} (8.0/sq mi)	3/km^{2} (7.8/sq mi)	3.3/km^{2} (8.5/sq mi)
Median age	52.4 (M: 49.2, F: 54)	51.2 (M: 47.2, F: 54.6)	48.3 (M: 49.2, F: 47.5)
Private dwellings	245 (total) 212 (occupied)	239 (total)	218 (total)
Median household income	$49,600	$40,192	$32,950

References: 2021 2016 2011

Historical census populations – Saint-Vianney

Year	Pop.	±%
1931	877	—
1941	922	+5.1%
1951	848	−8.0%
1956	903	+6.5%
1961	973	+7.8%
1966	797	−18.1%
1971	652	−18.2%
1976	623	−4.4%
1981	681	+9.3%

Year	Pop.	±%
1986	663	−2.6%
1991	608	−8.3%
1996	592	−2.6%
2001	525	−11.3%
2006	489	−6.9%
2011	477	−2.5%
2016	441	−7.5%
2021	446	+1.1%

Source: Statistics Canada

Mother tongue (2021):

- English as first language: 0%
- French as first language: 100%
- English and French as first languages: 0%
- Other as first language: 0%

== Government ==
Municipal council:

- Mayor: Georges Guénard
- Councillors: Jean-Pierre Beaupré, Cathy Santerre, Monique Blanchette, Julien Verreault, Guy Plourde, Geneviève Verreault

List of former mayors:

- Omer Poulin (1926–1928)
- Delphis Beaupré (1928–1933)
- Euclide Gagnon (1933–1937)
- John Perreault (1937–1940)
- Rodrigue Beaudoin (1940–1942, 1949–1952)
- Luc Allaire (1942–1943)
- Aimé Lapointe (1943–1946)
- Charles Pépin (1946–1949)
- Eddy St-Laurent (1952–1954)
- Aimé Blanchette (1954–1956)
- Noël Charest (1956–1961, 1966–1971)
- Joseph Maximilien Alundin Barbeau (1961–1966)
- Noël Hamel (1971–1981)
- Bertrand Charette (1981–1983)
- Roger Jean (1983–1993)
- Roger Blanchette (1993–2001)
- Georges Guénard (2001–present)

== See also ==
- List of municipalities in Quebec
