= Ristigouche-Sud-Est =

- Municipality
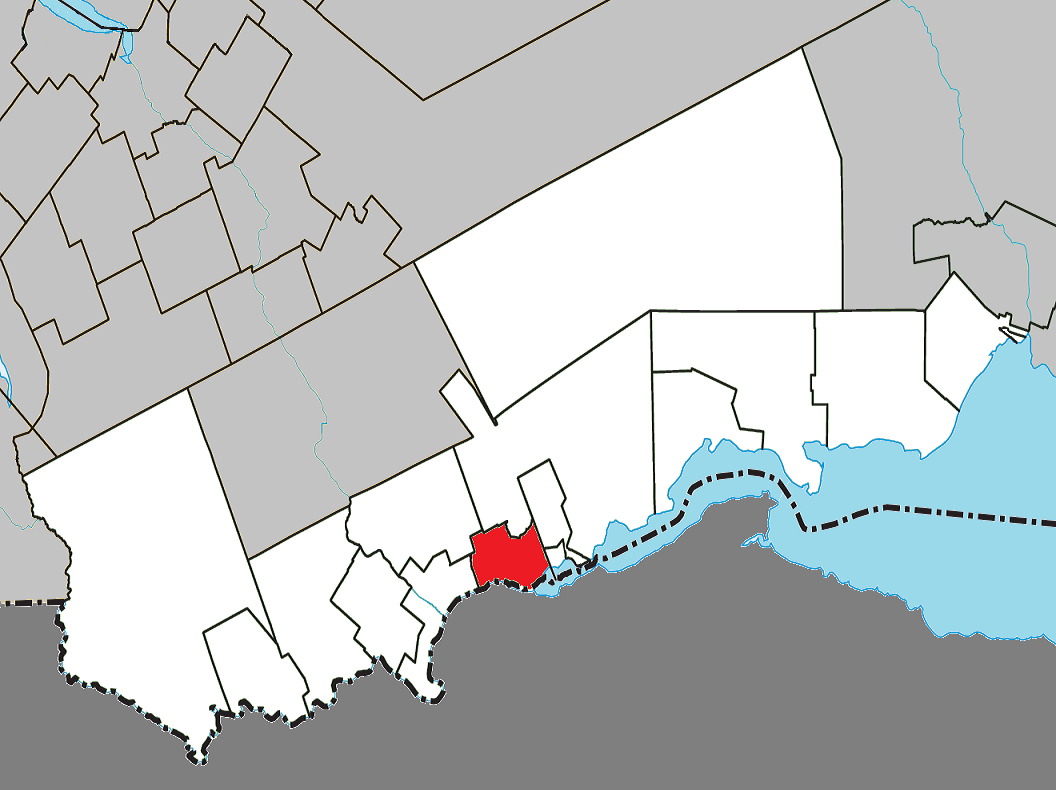
- Location within Avignon RCM

- Location in eastern Quebec
- Coordinates: 48°03′N 66°52′W
- Country: Canada
- Province: Quebec
- Region: Gaspésie– Îles-de-la-Madeleine
- RCM: Avignon
- Constituted: June 30, 1906

Government
  - Mayor: David Ferguson
  - Federal riding: Gaspésie—Les Îles-de-la-Madeleine—Listuguj
  - Prov. riding: Bonaventure

Area
  - Total: 53.81 km^{2} (20.78 sq mi)
  - Land: 51.76 km^{2} (19.98 sq mi)

Population (2021)
  - Total: 170
  - Density: 3.3/km^{2} (8.5/sq mi)
  - Pop (2016-21): ▼0.6%
  - Dwellings: 95
- Time zone: UTC−5 (EST)
  - Summer (DST): UTC−4 (EDT)
- Postal code(s): G0J 1V0
- Area codes: 418 and 581
- Highways: R-132
- Website: ristigouche.ca

Ristigouche-Sud-Est (French pronunciation: [ʁistiɡuʃ syd ɛst]; or Ristigouche-Partie-Sud-Est until February 2024) is a municipality in Quebec, Canada, near the head of the Baie de Chaleur. It is a rural municipality without population centres, situated along the CN Railway line which hosts the VIA Rail Ocean (train) route; the nearest VIA station is Matapedia.

== History ==
At the beginning of the 19th century, the voyage between Quebec and Saint John passed the Temiscouata Portage and via the Saint John River valley. After the War of 1812, it was decided to develop a new maritime route which was to be located away from the border. The Matapedia River valley was selected, and the route would be named Kempt Road, for General Sir James Kempt, then Governor-General of British North America. Construction started in 1830, under the supervision of William MacDonald, Frederic Fournier and Major Wolfe, but the route remained difficult and government decided to abandon it in 1857. A new path between Causapscal and the Restigouche was adopted in 1862, and in 1868 the Intercolonial Railway project that was to transform the British North American Colonies into Canada selected the Matapedia River road to be its route. On 1 July 1876, the Sainte-Flavie-Campbellton section was opened.

The township municipality was formed in 1907 when it separated from the Township Municipality of Ristigouche (now Saint-André-de-Restigouche).

On 17 April 1983, the 480 ha (4.8 km^{2}) Ristigouche Ecological Reserve was formed by the Quebec government.

In March 2013, the municipality was served notice of pursuit by the resource extractor Gastem for $1.5 million because the municipality sought to protect its drinking water source from fracking, by imposing an exclusion zone of 2 km around water wells. Gastem later ceded its exploration permits to Pétrolia. now a subsidiary of the French multinational oil producer Maurel et Prom, The municipality had amassed $146,000 in its charitable legal defence fund as of March 2015. Gastem offered an amicable resolution at that time for that cost. Ultimately, a judge of the Superior Court of Quebec ruled in the township's favour in 2017.

In February 2024, the township changed status to became a regular municipality and took the current name of Ristigouche-Sud-Est.

== Demographics ==
In the 2021 Census of Population conducted by Statistics Canada, Ristigouche-Sud-Est had a population of 170 living in 81 of its 95 total private dwellings, a change of −0.6% from its 2016 population of 171. With a land area of 51.76 km^{2} (19.98 sq mi), it had a population density of 3.3/km^{2} (8.5/sq mi) in 2021.

Canada census – Ristigouche-Sud-Est community profile

	2021	2016	2011
Population	170 (-0.6% from 2016)	171 (2.4% from 2011)	167 (-3.5% from 2006)
Land area	51.76 km^{2} (19.98 sq mi)	51.70 km^{2} (19.96 sq mi)	51.27 km^{2} (19.80 sq mi)
Population density	3.3/km^{2} (8.5/sq mi)	3.3/km^{2} (8.5/sq mi)	3.3/km^{2} (8.5/sq mi)
Median age	50.8 (M: 51.6, F: 50.0)	56.5 (M: 57.2, F: 56.2)	52.2 (M: 52.0, F: 52.8)
Private dwellings	95 (total) 81 (occupied)	91 (total)	91 (total)
Median household income	$.N/A	$.N/A	$.N/A

Notes: Income data for this area has been suppressed for data quality or confidentiality reasons.
References: 2021 2016 2011

Historical Census Data - Ristigouche-Sud-Est, Quebec

Year	Pop.	±%
1911	285	—
1921	357	+25.3%
1931	312	−12.6%
1941	371	+18.9%
1951	288	−22.4%
1956	271	−5.9%
1961	170	−37.3%

Year	Pop.	±%
1966	159	−6.5%
1971	145	−8.8%
1976	194	+33.8%
1981	155	−20.1%
1986	145	−6.5%
1991	154	+6.2%
1996	155	+0.6%

Year	Pop.	±%
2001	165	+6.5%
2006	173	+4.8%
2011	167	−3.5%
2016	171	+2.4%
2021	170	−0.6%

Source: Statistics Canada

=== Language ===
Canada Census Mother Tongue - Ristigouche-Sud-Est, Quebec
Census	Total	French			English			French & English			Other		
Year	Responses	Count	Trend	Pop %	Count	Trend	Pop %	Count	Trend	Pop %	Count	Trend	Pop %
2021	170	130	0.0%	76.5%	35	▼12.5%	20.6%	5	▲ n/a%	2.9%	0	▼100.0%	0.0%
2016	175	130	▲4.0%	74.3%	40	▲14.3%	22.9%	0	▼100.0%	0.0%	5	▲ n/a%	2.9%
2011	165	125	▼7.4%	75.8%	35	▲16.7%	21.2%	5	▼50.0%	3.0%	0	0.0%	0.0%
2006	170	135	▲8.0%	79.4%	30	▼14.3%	17.6%	10	▲ n/a%	5.9%	0	0.0%	0.0%
2001	165	125	▲47.1%	75.8%	35	▼30.0%	21.2%	0	0.0%	0.0%	0	0.0%	0.0%
1996	140	85	n/a	60.7%	50	n/a	35.7%	0	n/a	0.0%	0	n/a	0.0%

== Government ==
Municipal council (as of 2024):

- Mayor: David Ferguson
- Councillors: Daniel Charest, Lucien Leblanc, Francis Levesque, Marie-Ève Nadeau, Sabrina Landry-Court, Mélanie Côté

== See also ==
- List of anglophone communities in Quebec
- List of municipalities in Quebec
