= Assemetquagan River =

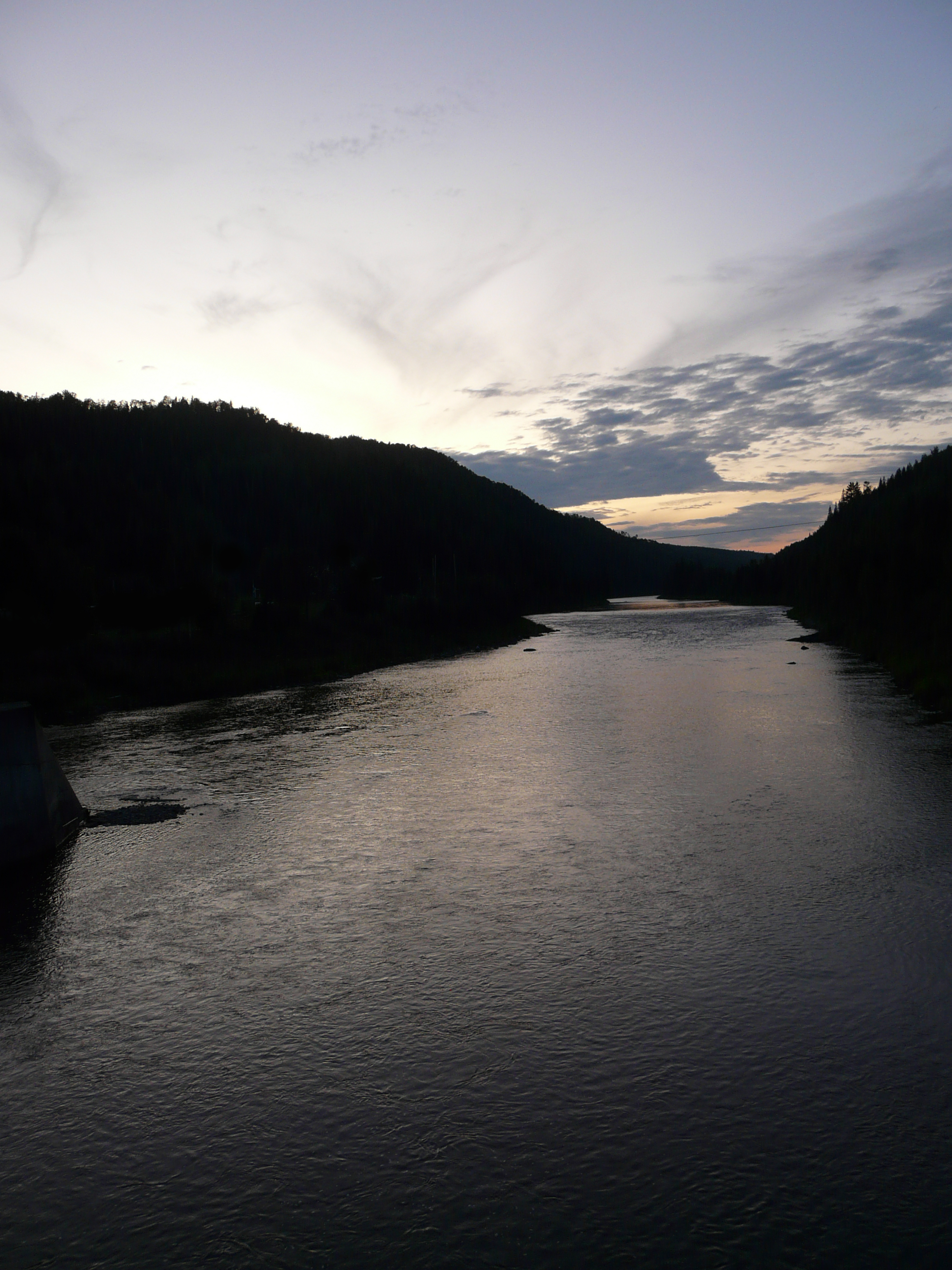
- Native name: Rivière Matapédia (French)

Location
- Country: Canada
- Province: Quebec

Physical characteristics
- Mouth
  - location: Matapedia River
  - coordinates: 48°04′45″N 67°05′52″W
- Length: 50 km (31 mi)

Basin features
- Tributaries
  - left: (from confluence) Saint-Étienne Brook, Purvis Brook, East Assemetquagan River
  - right: (from confluence) Falls brook, Doiron brook, Huit Milles brook, Creux brook, Castor brook, Lavoie brook, McDavid brook, Pratt canyon, West Assemetquagan River

The Assemetquagan River is a freshwater river in the Matapedia Valley, in Quebec, in Canada. Its water source lies within the Notre Dame Mountains, while it ends by flowing into the Matapedia River 20 kilometres (12 mi) North by Northwest of Matapédia, Quebec.

. This river runs through the regional county municipalities (RCM):

- Avignon Regional County Municipality (in administrative region Gaspésie-Îles-de-la-Madeleine): unorganized territory of New River: Fauvel (township); and municipality of Saint-André, New Brunswick in Restigouche County;
- La Matapedia Regional County Municipality (in administrative region of Bas-Saint-Laurent): unorganized territory of Routhierville, Quebec: Assemetquagan (township).

The Assemetquagan river rises in the section of Chic-Choc Mountains (part of the Notre Dame Mountains) and flows into the Matapedia River in 20 kilometres (12 mi) of Matapedia, Quebec. The river is part of the tourist region of Gaspésie in the tourist sub-region of Matapedia Valley.

== Geography ==
The Assemetquagan River originates in mountainous areas in Fauvel (township), at the confluence of East Assemetquagan River and West Assemetquagan River, which drain northern mountains in the Zec Casault.

This confluence of two tributaries is located at:

- 1.4 kilometres (0.87 mi) Southeast of the boundary of La Verendrye (township);
- 38.8 kilometres (24.1 mi) Northeast of the confluence of Assemetquagan River;
- 42.8 kilometres (26.6 mi) Northeast of the confluence of the Matapedia River;
- 39.4 kilometres (24.5 mi) North of the bridge over the Restigouche River linking the city of Campbellton (in New Brunswick) and the village of Pointe-à-la-Croix (in Quebec).

Almost all over the Assemetquagan River is the southern boundary of the Zec Casault, except the last segment of 4.6 kilometres (2.9 mi) from the confluence.

From its source, the Assemetquagan flows on 55.4 kilometres (34.4 mi), as follow segments:

Higher Courses of the river(segment of 26.0 kilometres (16.2 mi))

- 8.1 kilometres (5.0 mi) Southwest in the Fauvel (township), winding through a deep valley up to McDavid stream (from the West);
- 4.0 kilometres (2.5 mi) Southwest, winding up to Lavoie stream (from the Northwest);
- 2.9 kilometres (1.8 mi) South up to Purvis Creek (from the East);
- 7.1 kilometres (4.4 mi) Southwest, winding up to the limit of Assemetquagan (township);
- 0.3 kilometres (0.19 mi) Southward in Assemetquagan (township) up to a stream (from the Northwest);
- 7.5 kilometres (4.7 mi) Westward, forming a detour to the South, up to Beaver Creek (from the Northwest)

Lower river course(segment of 2 kilometres (1.2 mi))

- 1.7 kilometres (1.1 mi) South, up to the forest road bridge;
- 6.5 kilometres (4.0 mi) Southwest, winding up to Hollow Creek (from the North);
- 5.8 kilometres (3.6 mi) South, winding at the start of segment, up to Saint-Étienne Brook (from the East);
- 6.2 kilometres (3.9 mi) South, then East, collecting the waters of Eight Miles Creek, up to a Doiron stream (from the North);
- 4.6 kilometres (2.9 mi) Southwest, up to the limit of Zec Casault;
- 3.2 kilometres (2.0 mi) South, up to boundary of the Restigouche (township);
- 1.4 kilometres (0.87 mi) Southwest, passing under a covered bridge, up to the confluence of the river.

The confluence of the river is located:

- 1.9 kilometres (1.2 mi) upstream of the confluence of the Mill River (Matapedia River) (from the West);
- 15.7 kilometres (9.8 mi) Northeast of the confluence of the Matapedia River;
- 32.5 kilometres (20.2 mi) North of the bridge over the Restigouche River to link the city of Campbellton (in New Brunswick) and the village of Pointe-à-la-Croix (in Quebec).

== Etymology ==
The river takes its name from the Mi'kmaq language and roughly translates as "sudden waterway on a curve."

The toponym "Assemetquagan River" was officialized on December 5, 1968 by Commission de toponymie du Québec.

== See also ==
- Restigouche River
- Matapédia River, un cours d'eau
- East Assemetquagan River, un cours d'eau
- West Assemetquagan River, un cours d'eau
- Saint-André-de-Restigouche, Quebec, a municipality
- Hydrography of Matapédia Valley
- Matapédia Valley
- Bas-Saint-Laurent, an administrative region
- Gaspésie
