= Saint-André-de-Restigouche =

- Municipality
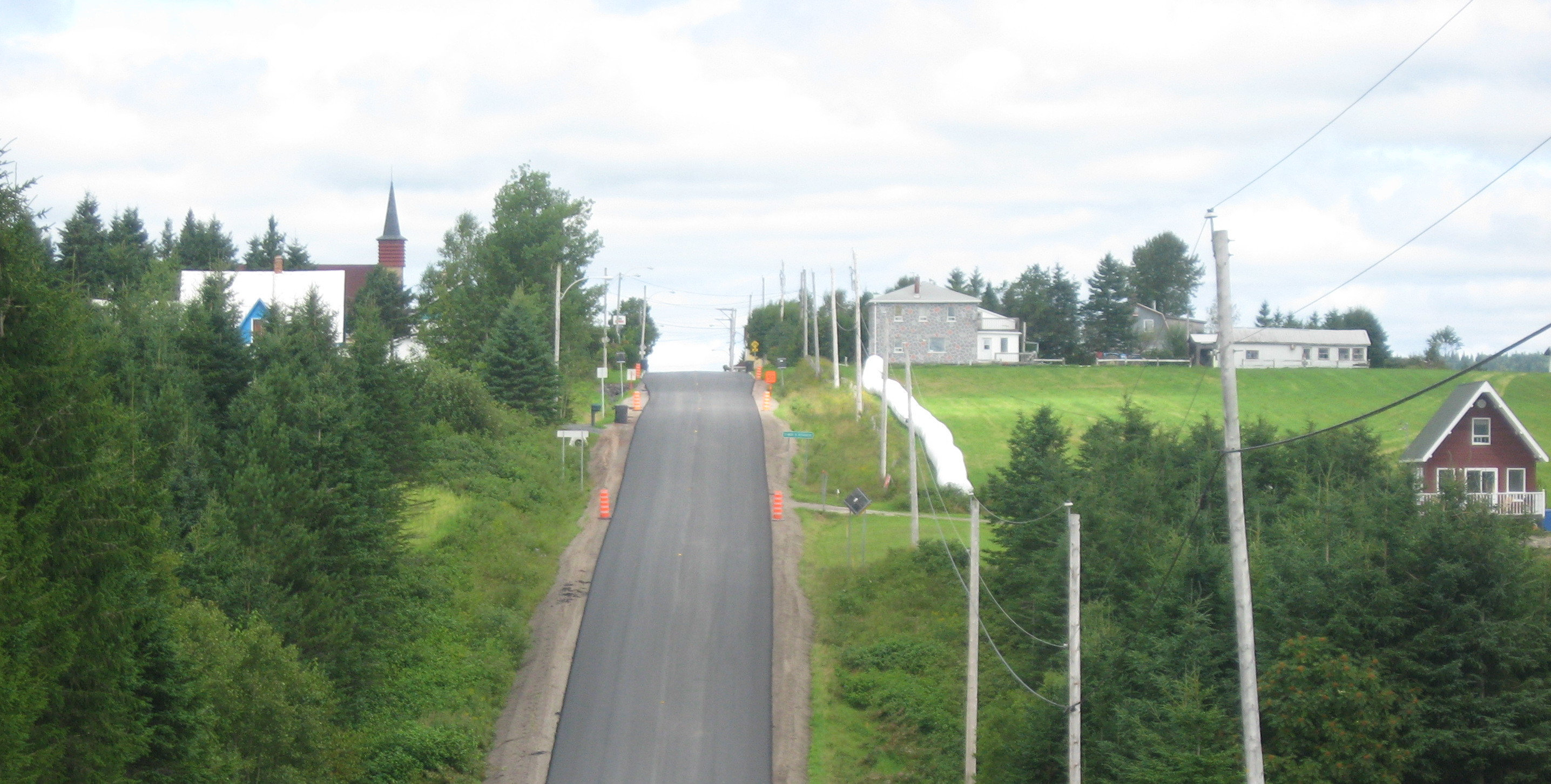
- Motto: Ardeur, tenacité, dynamisme
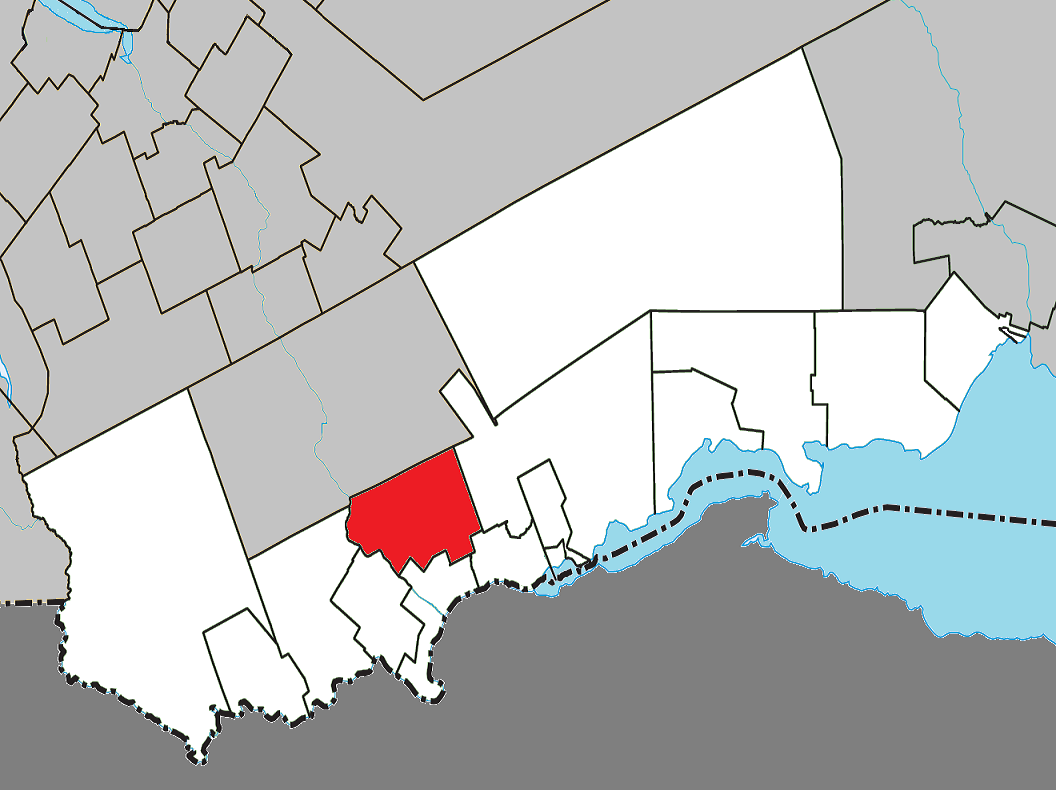
- Location within Avignon RCM

- Location in eastern Quebec
- Coordinates: 48°04′N 66°57′W
- Country: Canada
- Province: Quebec
- Region: Gaspésie– Îles-de-la-Madeleine
- RCM: Avignon
- Constituted: July 1, 1855

Government
  - Mayor: Doris Deschênes
  - Federal riding: Gaspésie—Les Îles-de-la-Madeleine—Listuguj
  - Prov. riding: Bonaventure

Area
  - Total: 144.14 km^{2} (55.65 sq mi)
  - Land: 143.37 km^{2} (55.36 sq mi)

Population (2021)
  - Total: 154
  - Density: 1.1/km^{2} (2.8/sq mi)
  - Pop 2016-2021: ▼4.3%
  - Dwellings: 92
- Time zone: UTC−5 (EST)
  - Summer (DST): UTC−4 (EDT)
- Postal code(s): G0J 2G0
- Area codes: 418 and 581
- Highways: R-132
- Website: www.matapedia lesplateaux.com

Saint-André-de-Restigouche (French pronunciation: [sɛ̃t‿ɑ̃dʁe də ʁɛstiɡuʃ]) is a municipality in Quebec, Canada.

Its economy is mostly dependent on agriculture, as well as forestry. The International Appalachian Trail traverses the municipality.

== History ==
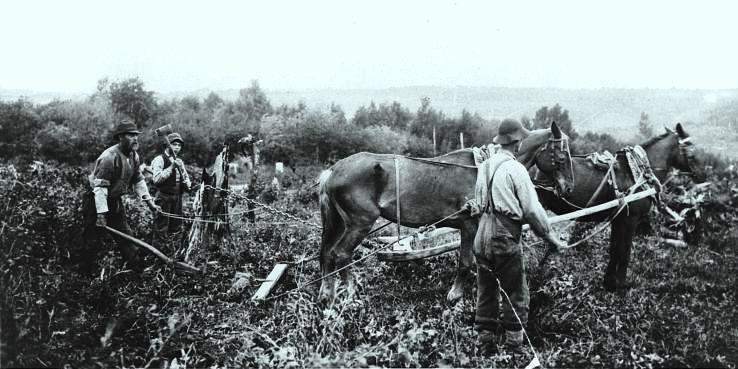
Horses pulling tree stumps in Saint-André ca. 1870

In 1760, the site was the scene of the last battle between the English and French, which resulted in the destruction of the settlement and the displacement of its population to the east. It was repopulated by Acadians and French Canadians in the 19th century.

In 1842, the geographic township of Ristigouche was formed, named after the Restigouche River (Ristigouche in French) on which it bordered. In 1855, it was incorporated as the Township Municipality of Ristigouche. In 1908, the Parish of Saint-André was established, named in honour of André-Albert Blais (1842-1919), bishop of Rimouski from 1891 to 1919.

In 1907, the township lost the south-eastern portion of its territory when it separated to form the Township Municipality of Ristigouche-Partie-Sud-Est.

In 1989, the township changed its name and status to Municipality of Saint-André-de-Restigouche, choosing to adopt the parish name to avoid confusion with other places.

== Geography ==
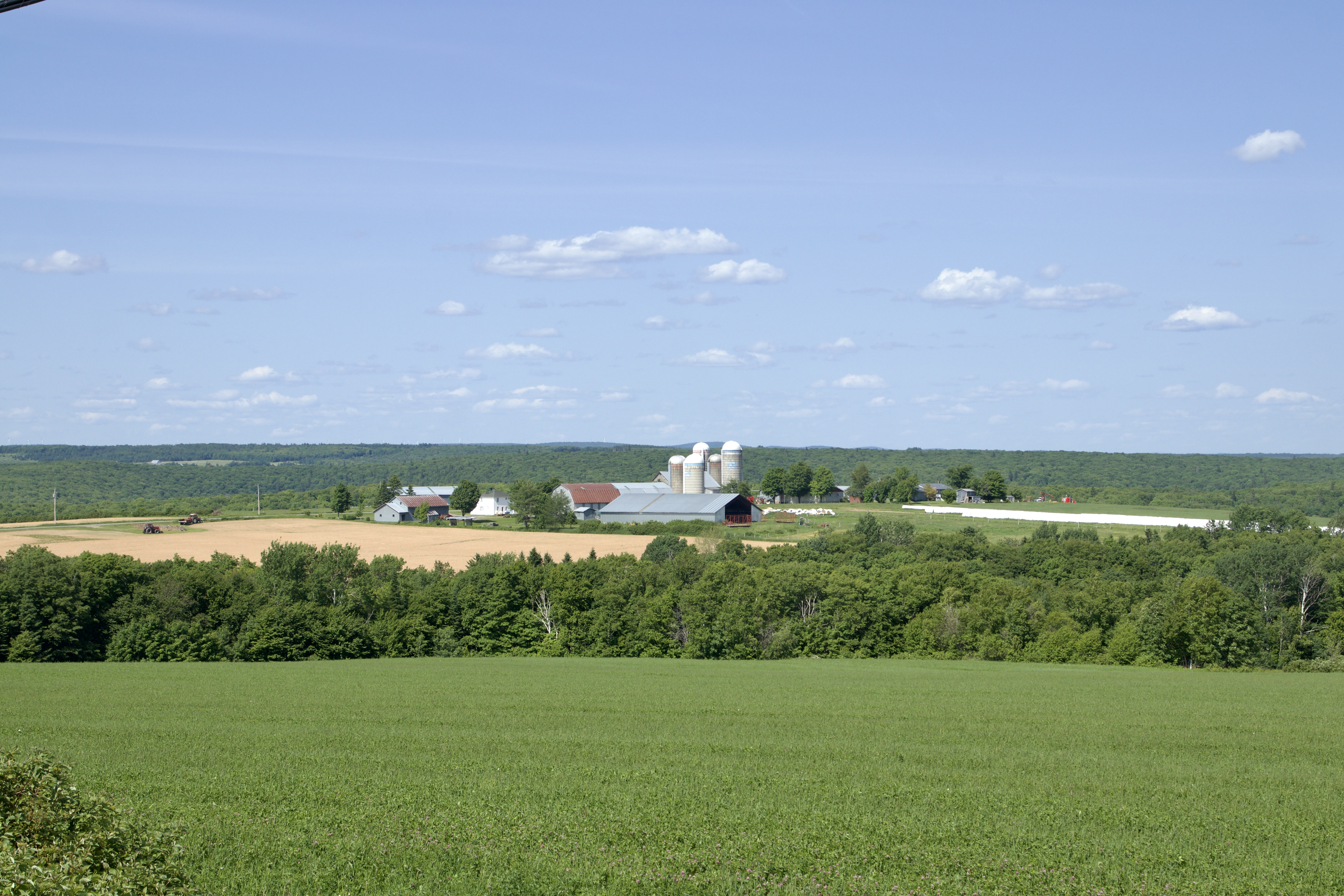
Rural farm landscape

The municipality is bounded to the west by the Matapedia River. The confluence of the Assemetquagan River with the Matapédia River is located at the northwest end of the municipality.

=== Hamlets ===
In addition to the hamlet of Saint-André-de-Restigouche proper, the municipality is made up of two other hamlets that act as neighborhoods within the municipality of Saint-André-de-Restgouche:

- Millstream
- Saint-Victor-de-Bonaventure

== Demographics ==
=== Population ===
Canada census – Saint-André-de-Restigouche community profile

	2021	2016	2011
Population	154 (-4.3% from 2016)	161 (+2.5% from 2011)	157 (-18.2% from 2006)
Land area	143.37 km^{2} (55.36 sq mi)	144.54 km^{2} (55.81 sq mi)	143.96 km^{2} (55.58 sq mi)
Population density	1.1/km^{2} (2.8/sq mi)	1.1/km^{2} (2.8/sq mi)	1.1/km^{2} (2.8/sq mi)
Median age	58.4 (M: 55.2, F: 59.2)	55.6 (M: 56.2, F: 55.2)	49.9 (M: 48.5, F: 50.4)
Private dwellings	92 (total) 72 (occupied)	95 (total)	87 (total)
Median household income	$.N/A	$.N/A	$.N/A

Notes: Income data for this area has been suppressed for data quality or confidentiality reasons.
References: 2021 2016 2011

Historical Census Data - Saint-André-de-Restigouche, Quebec

Year	Pop.	±%
1861	521	—
1871	575	+10.4%
1881	339	−41.0%
1896	579	+70.8%
1901	922	+59.2%
1911	428	−53.6%
1921	489	+14.3%
1931	551	+12.7%

Year	Pop.	±%
1941	753	+36.7%
1951	872	+15.8%
1956	832	−4.6%
1961	794	−4.6%
1966	569	−28.3%
1971	464	−18.5%
1976	330	−28.9%
1981	253	−23.3%

Year	Pop.	±%
1986	213	−15.8%
1991	227	+6.6%
1996	220	−3.1%
2001	218	−0.9%
2006	192	−11.9%
2011	157	−18.2%
2016	161	+2.5%
2021	154	−4.3%

Source: Statistics Canada

=== Language ===
Canada Census Mother Tongue - Saint-André-de-Restigouche, Quebec
Census	Total	French			English			French & English			Other		
Year	Responses	Count	Trend	Pop %	Count	Trend	Pop %	Count	Trend	Pop %	Count	Trend	Pop %
2021	155	140	▲3.7%	90.3%	10	▼60.0%	6.5%	0	0.0%	0.0%	0	0.0%	0.0%
2016	160	135	▼6.9%	84.4%	25	▲150.0%	15.6%	0	0.0%	0.0%	0	0.0%	0.0%
2011	155	145	▼3.3%	93.5%	10	▼66.7%	6.5%	0	0.0%	0.0%	0	▼100.0%	0.0%
2006	190	150	▼23.1%	78.9%	30	▲20.0%	15.8%	0	0.0%	0.0%	10	▲ n/a%	5.3%
2001	215	195	▼2.5%	90.7%	25	▲25.0%	11.6%	0	0.0%	0.0%	0	0.0%	0.0%
1996	220	200	n/a	90.9%	20	n/a	9.1%	0	n/a	0.0%	0	n/a	0.0%

== See also ==
- List of municipalities in Quebec
