= 22nd Battalion (French Canadian), CEF =

Canadian unit in the First World War

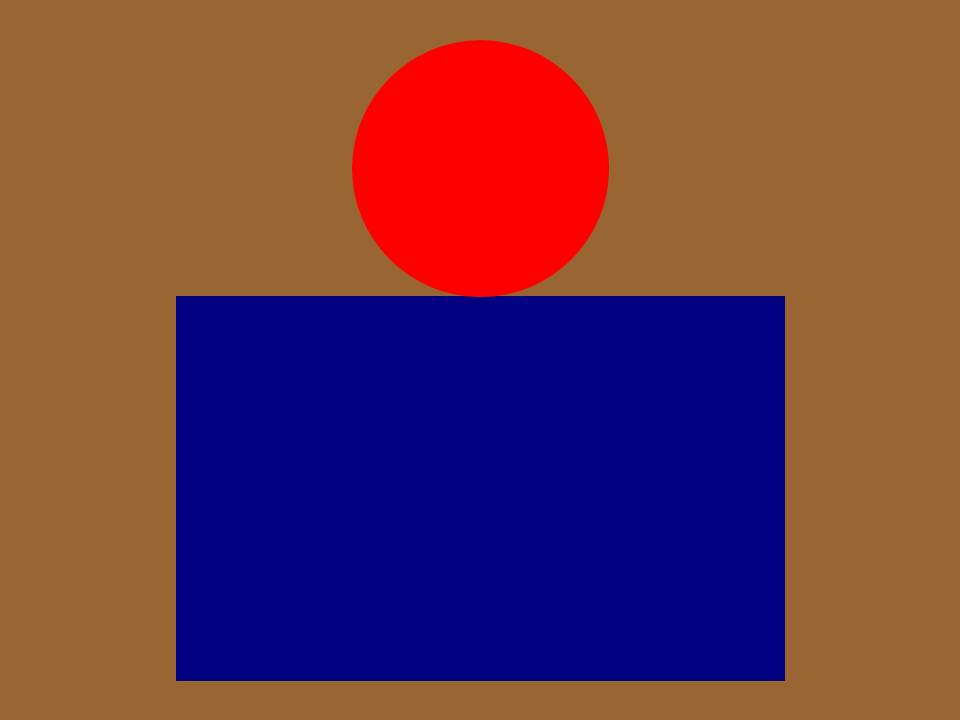
- The distinguishing patch of the 22nd Battalion (French Canadian), CEF.
- Active: 1914-1920
- Country: Canada
- Branch: Canadian Expeditionary Force
- Role: Infantry
- Size: battalion
- Engagements: First World War

The 22nd Battalion (French Canadian), CEF, was an infantry battalion of the Canadian Expeditionary Force in the Great War.

== History ==
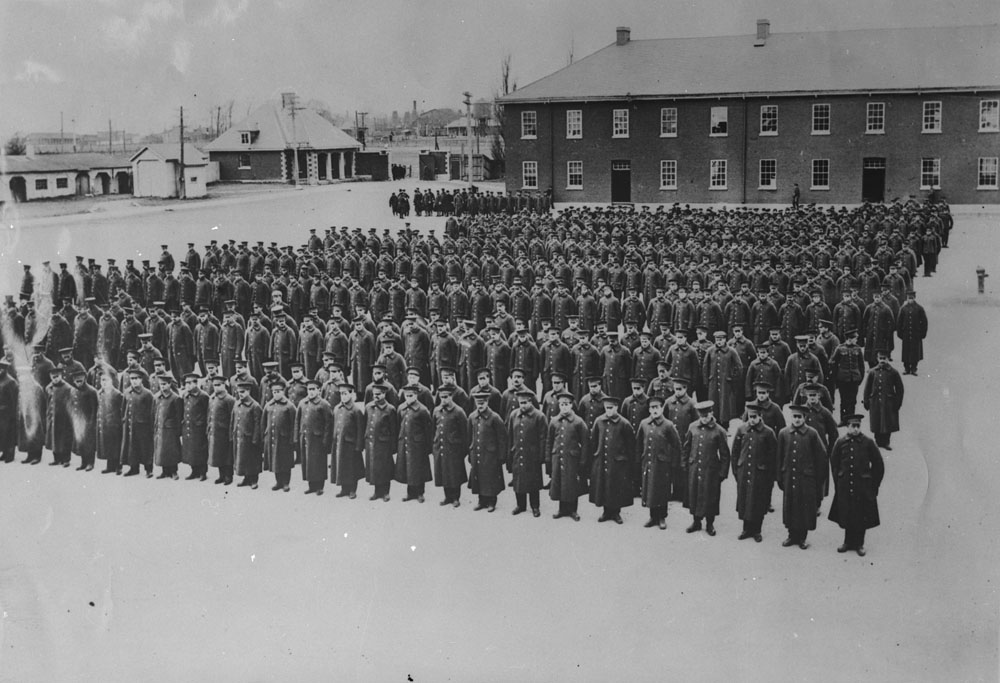
22nd Battalion Canadian Expeditionary Force on parade at St Jean, Quebec in 1915

The battalion was authorized on 7 November 1914 and embarked for Great Britain on 20 May 1915. It disembarked in France on 15 September 1915, where it fought as part of the 5th Infantry Brigade, 2nd Canadian Division in France and Flanders until the end of the war. The battalion was disbanded on 15 September 1920.

The 22nd Battalion recruited in Quebec and was mobilized at Saint-Jean-sur-Richelieu, Quebec.

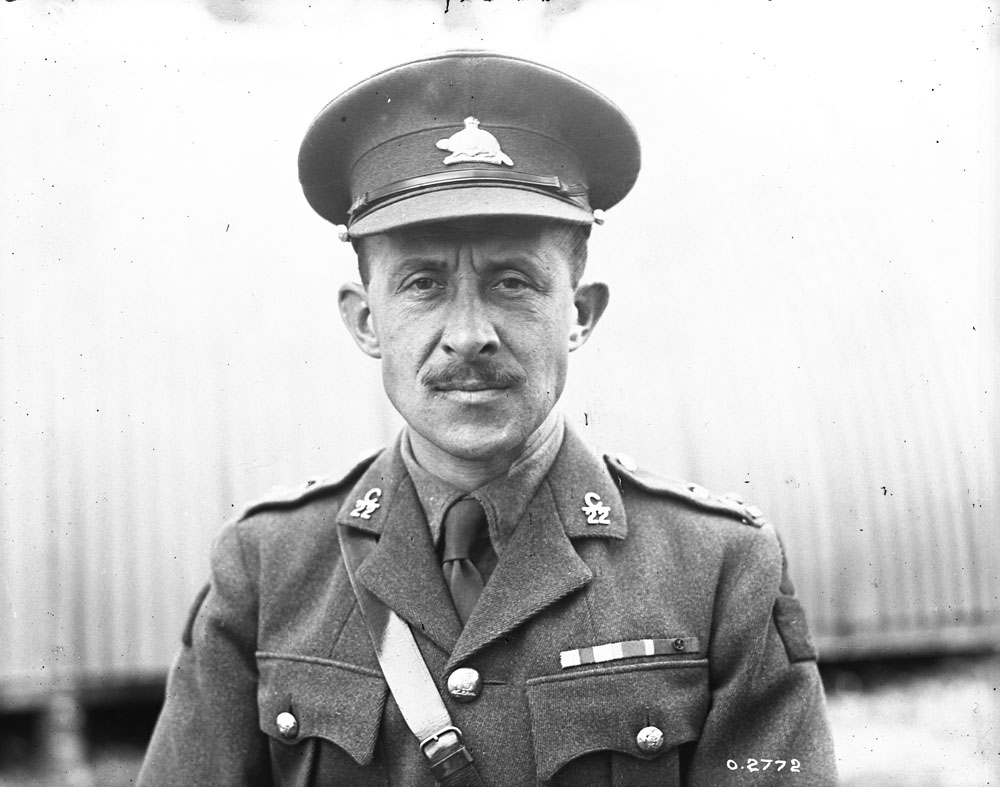
Lieutenant-Colonel Thomas-Louis Tremblay, Officer Commanding, 22nd (French Canadian) Battalion, Canadian Expeditionary Force, June 1918

The 22nd Battalion had six officers commanding:

- Col. F.M. Gaudet, 20 May 1915 – 25 January 1916
- Lt.-Col. T.L. Tremblay, DSO, 25 January 1916 – 25 September 1916
- Lt.-Col. A.E. Dubuc, DSO, 24 October 1916 – 5 February 1917
- Lt.-Col. T.L. Tremblay, CMG, DSO, 15 February 1917 – 8 August 1918
- Lt.-Col. A.E. Dubuc, DSO, 9 August 1918 – 27 August 1918
- Maj. G.P. Vanier, MC, 27 August 1918 – 28 August 1918
- Maj. G.E.A. Dupuis, MC, 28 August 1918 – 10 September 1918
- Lt.Col. J.R.H. DesRosiers, 10 September 1918 - demobilization

Two members of the 22nd Battalion were awarded the Victoria Cross: Corporal Joseph Kaeble was posthumously awarded the Victoria Cross for his actions on 8 June 1918 at Neuville-Vitasse, France, and Lieutenant Jean Brillant was posthumously awarded the Victoria Cross for his actions on 8 and 9 August 1918 east of Méharicourt, France, during the Battle of Amiens.

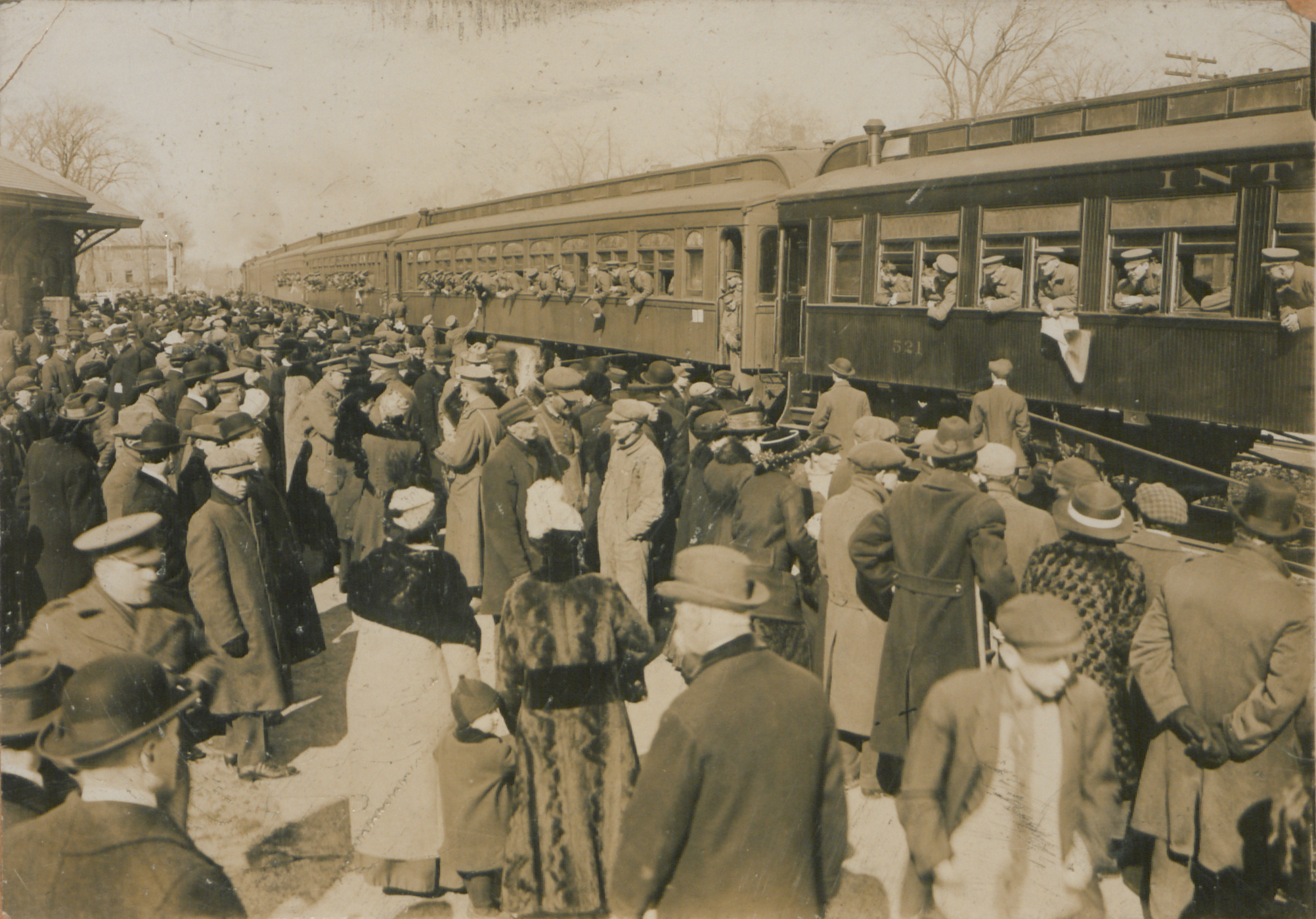
The farewell (HS85-10-30885)

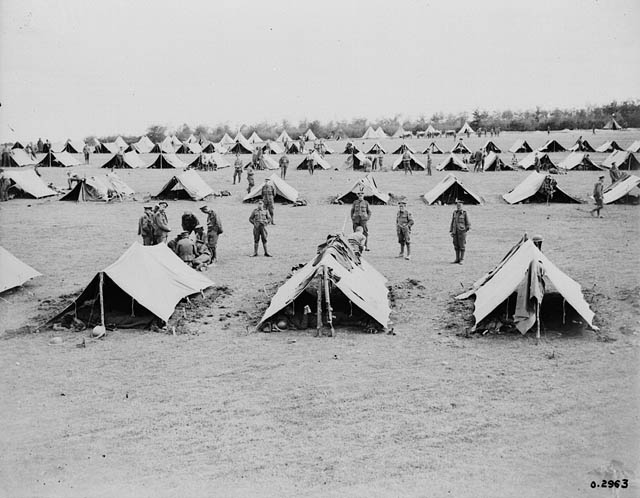
22nd Battalion bivouacked behind the line during the Battle of Amiens

== Perpetuation ==
The battalion is perpetuated by the Royal 22e Régiment.

== Battle honours ==
The 22nd Battalion was awarded the following battle honours:

- MOUNT SORREL
- SOMME, 1916, '18
- FLERS-COURCELETTE
- Thiepval
- Ancre Heights
- ARRAS, 1917, '18
- Vimy, 1917
- Arleux
- Scarpe, 1917, '18
- HILL 70
- Ypres 1917
- Passchendaele
- AMIENS
- HINDENBURG LINE
- Canal du Nord
- Cambrai, 1918
- PURSUIT TO MONS
- FRANCE AND FLANDERS, 1915-18

== See also ==
- List of infantry battalions in the Canadian Expeditionary Force

== Sources ==
- Canadian Expeditionary Force 1914-1919 by Col. G.W.L. Nicholson, CD, Queen's Printer, Ottawa, Ontario, 1962
