= Lac-au-Saumon, Quebec =

Lac-au-Saumon
- Municipality

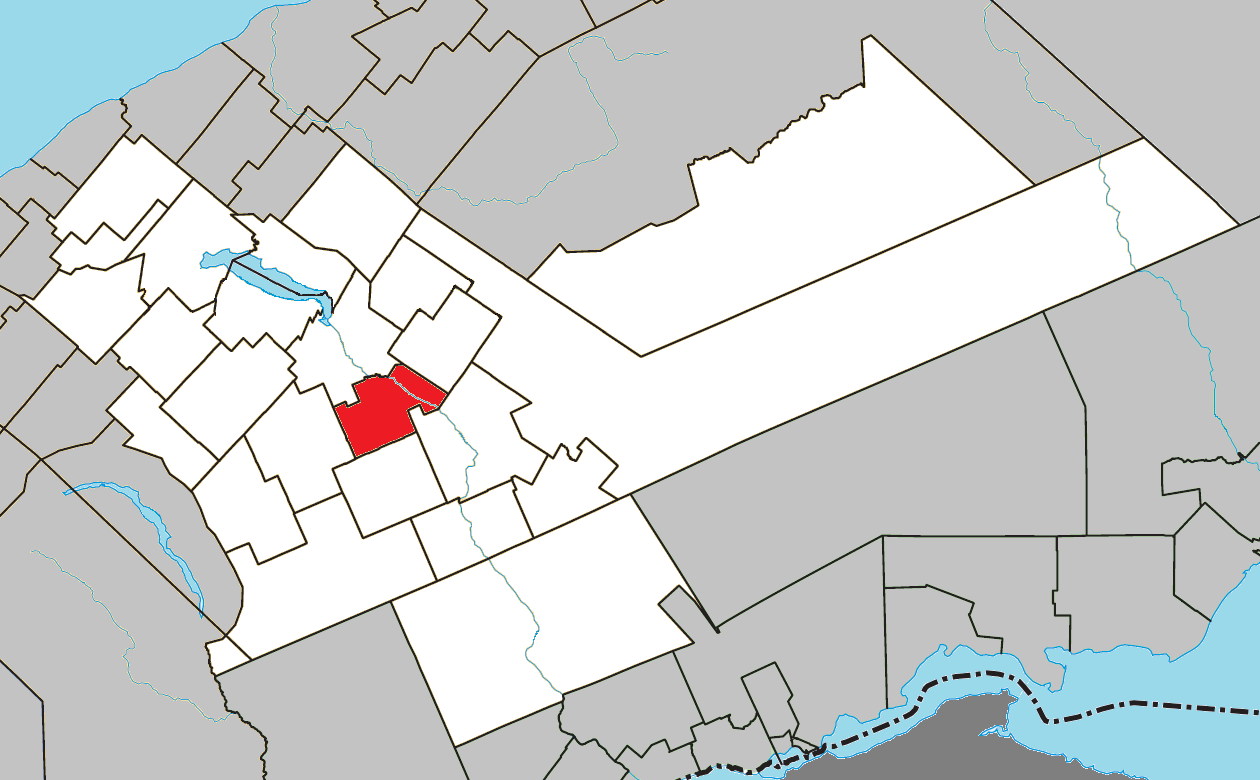
- Location within La Matapédia RCM

- Location in eastern Quebec
- Coordinates: 48°25′N 67°21′W
- Country: Canada
- Province: Quebec
- Region: Bas-Saint-Laurent
- RCM: La Matapédia
- Settled: 1896
- Constituted: December 17, 1997

Government
  - Mayor: Chantal Gagné
  - Fed. riding: Rimouski-Neigette—Mitis—Matapédia—Les Basques
  - Prov. riding: Matane-Matapédia-Mitis

Area
  - Total: 85.04 km^{2} (32.83 sq mi)
  - Land: 81.05 km^{2} (31.29 sq mi)

Population (2021)
  - Total: 1,488
  - Density: 18.4/km^{2} (48/sq mi)
  - Change 2016-21: ▲2.6%
  - Dwellings: 646
- Demonym: Saumonois
- Time zone: UTC−5 (EST)
  - Summer (DST): UTC−4 (EDT)
- Postal code(s): G0J 1M0
- Area codes: 418, 581
- Highways: R-132
- Website: municipalites-du-quebec.ca/lac-au-saumon/

Lac-au-Saumon (French pronunciation: [lak o somɔ̃]) is a municipality in the Canadian province of Quebec, located in La Matapédia Regional Council Municipality in the Matapédia Valley.

The municipality had a population of 1,488 as of the 2021 Canadian census.

The village is located on the shores of the eponymous Lac au Saumon (French for "Salmon Lake") that is an enlargement of the Matapédia River. It was known as a spawning ground for salmon, but major pollution from mills made this a thing of the past.

== History ==
The area opened up to colonization in 1863, and the Mission of Saint-Edmond-du-Lac-au-Saumon was founded in 1876. But it was not until 1896 that real settlement began with the arrival of a group of Acadians from the Magdalen Islands. The following year the Lac-au-Saumon post office opened.

In 1904, the Municipality of Saint-Edmond was incorporated when it separated from the Parish Municipality of Saint-Benoît-Joseph-Labre (now Amqui). The following year, the Village Municipality of Lac-au-Saumon was established.

On December 17, 1997, the Village Municipality of Lac-au-Saumon and the Municipality of Saint-Edmond were amalgamated to form the new Municipality of Lac-au-Saumon.

== Geography ==
Lac-au-Saumon is located approximately 10 kilometres (6.2 mi) between Amqui and Causapscal, the two main towns of La Matapédia, on Route 132 which is the main communication axis of Bas-Saint-Laurent and Gaspésie. The latter passes on the north side of the lake although the bulk of the village is located to the south. North of the lake, we find the Notre Dame Mountains which are part of the Chic-Choc Mountains.

== Demographics ==
Canada census – Lac-au-Saumon community profile

	2021	2016	2011
Population	1,488 (+2.6% from 2016)	1,450 (-0.2% from 2011)	1,453 (-2.8% from 2006)
Land area	81.05 km^{2} (31.29 sq mi)	81.08 km^{2} (31.31 sq mi)	82.24 km^{2} (31.75 sq mi)
Population density	18.4/km^{2} (48/sq mi)	17.9/km^{2} (46/sq mi)	17.7/km^{2} (46/sq mi)
Median age	53.2 (M: 51.6, F: 54.8)	51.3 (M: 48.6, F: 53)	48.5 (M: 46.1, F: 50.4)
Private dwellings	646 (total) 607 (occupied)	598 (total)	565 (total)
Median household income	$65,000	$56,107	$43,079

References: 2021 2016 2011

Historical census populations – Lac-au-Saumon

Year	Pop.	±%
1911	1,171	—
1921	1,354	+15.6%
1931	1,779	+31.4%
1941	1,703	−4.3%
1951	1,622	−4.8%
1956	1,681	+3.6%
1961	1,548	−7.9%

Year	Pop.	±%
1966	1,393	−10.0%
1971	1,314	−5.7%
1976	1,309	−0.4%
1981	1,332	+1.8%
1986	1,330	−0.2%
1991	1,310	−1.5%
1996	1,314	+0.3%

Year	Pop.	±%
2001	1,539	+17.1%
2006	1,495	−2.9%
2011	1,453	−2.8%
2016	1,450	−0.2%
2021	1,488	+2.6%

Population counts are not adjusted for boundary changes or merger.
Source: Statistics Canada

Canada Census data before 2001 (pre-merger):

- Combined population in 1996: 1,553 (+0.06% from 1991)
  - Lac-au-Saumon (village): 1,314 (+0.3% from 1991)
  - Saint-Edmond (municipality): 239 (-1.2% from 1991)
- Combined population in 1991: 1,552
  - Lac-au-Saumon (village): 1,310
  - Saint-Edmond (municipality): 242

== Economy ==
Lac-au-Saumon's economic development is linked to agriculture and forestry, particularly wood processing.

== Sports ==
Lac-au-Saumon currently host two softball teams from the local league.

== Government ==
Municipal council:

- Mayor: Chantal Gagné
- Councillors: Gérald Ruel, Karine Dostie, Marie-Noëlle Ouellet, Michael Côté, Alain Fradette, Valérie Simard

Mayors of the Municipality of Lac-au-Saumon (following the merger with Saint-Edmond):

- Jean-Claude Dumoulin 1997–1998
- Aurélien Beaulieu 1998–2005
- Jean-Claude Dumoulin 2005–2009
- Michel Chevarie 2009–2017
- Gérard Grenier 2017-2025
- Chantal Gagné 2025-

Mayors of the former Village Municipality of Lac-au-Saumon:

- Joseph Gaudreau 1905–1909
- Hector Fournier 1909–1910
- Zénon Routhier 1910–1912
- J.-A. Burton 1912–1913
- Alphonse Landry 1913–1915
- M.-E. Castonguay 1915–1917
- P.-A. St-Laurent 1917–1921
- Ernest Deschênes 1921–1928
- Ferdinand Paradis 1928–1933
- Léo Marmen 1933–1937
- Ludger Leblanc 1937–1945
- Charles Lavoie 1945–1947
- Florian Drouin 1947–1949
- Ferdinand Dupont 1949–1960
- Adrien Ferlatte 1960–1963
- Joseph-Marie St-Amand 1963–1965
- Alphonse Richard 1965–1967
- Ghislain Roy 1967–1973
- Guy Garon 1973–1976
- Joseph O. Bérubé 1976–1978
- Alphonse Richard 1978–1982
- Jean-Guy Gagnon 1982–1983
- Roland Poitras 1983–1987
- Daniel Lamarre 1987–1993
- Jean-Claude Dumoulin 1993–1997

== See also ==
- List of municipalities in Quebec
