= Causapscal River =

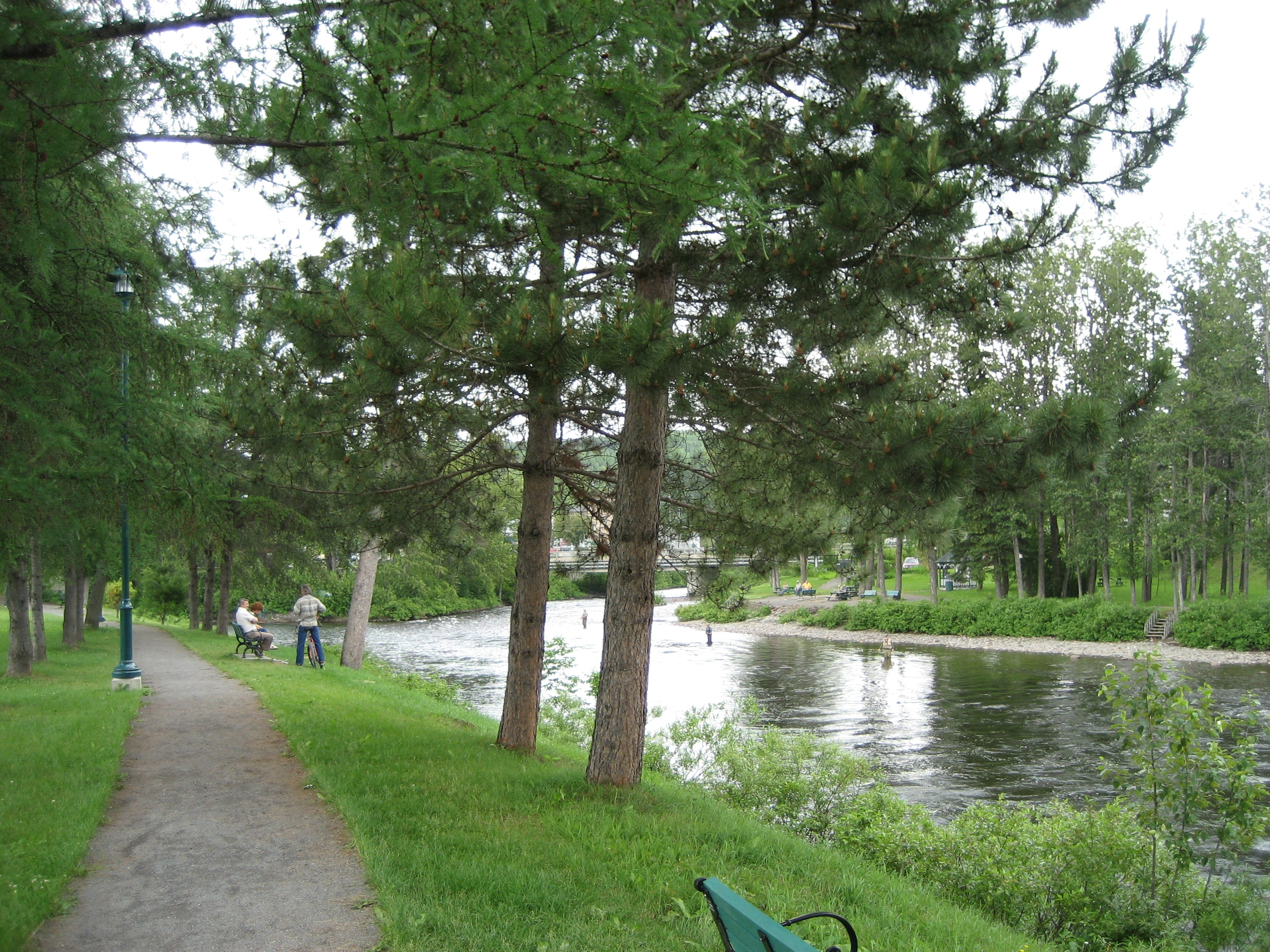
- Salmon fishers at Les Fourches stream pool at the junction of the Matapedia and Causapscal Rivers

Physical characteristics
- Mouth
  - location: Matapedia River
  - coordinates: 48°21′12″N 67°13′22″W
- Length: 60.9 km (37.8 mi)

The Causapscal River (/koʊzɑːpskæl/; French: [kozapskal]) is a waterway of 61.0 kilometres (37.9 mi) located in the Matapedia Valley, in La Matapédia Regional County Municipality, in administrative regions of Bas-Saint-Laurent and Gaspésie-Îles-de-la-Madeleine, in Quebec, Canada. It is a tributary to the Matapedia River; where these two meet is called Les Fourches stream pool.

The Causapscal River flows through the following townships successively:

- La Vérendrye (township), in the unorganized territory of Lac-Casault;
- Lagrange (township), in the unorganized territory of Ruisseau-des-Mineurs;
- Casault (township), in the unorganized territory of Lac-Casault;
- Blais (township), in the municipality of Saint-Tharcisius;
- Casault (township), in the unorganized territory of Lac-Casault;
- Lepage (township), in the municipality of Saint-Alexandre-des-Lacs;
- Casupscull (township), in the city of Causapscal.

This river of the Matapédia Valley empties into the east bank of the Matapédia River, in the city of Causapscal, at the level of "Les Fourches" salmon pool.

== Geography ==
The Causapscal River rises in the Dunière Wildlife Sanctuary, bordering the cantons of Catalonia (township) and La Verendrye (township). This source is located in the Chic-Choc Mountains (part of the Notre Dame Mountains).

This source is located in the La Verendrye (township):

- 3.5 kilometres (2.2 mi) southeast of the south boundary of the Lagrange (township);
- 32.4 kilometres (20.1 mi) northwest of the confluence of the "Causapscal River";
- 57.5 kilometres (35.7 mi) north of the confluence of the Matapedia River;
- 52.5 kilometres (32.6 mi) north of the bridge over the Restigouche River, linking the city of Campbellton (in New Brunswick) and the village of Pointe-à-la-Croix (in Quebec).

From its source, the course of the Causapscal River flows 73.4 kilometres (45.6 mi) divided into the following segments:

Upper courses of the river (segment of 43.6 kilometres (27.1 mi))

- 0.4 kilometres (0.25 mi) south in Lavérendrye (township), up to the southern boundary of the Zec Casault;
- 5.9 kilometres (3.7 mi) west up to Lévesque stream (from the southwest);
- 3.4 kilometres (2.1 mi) northwest up to the boundary of the Lagrange (township);
- 5.2 kilometres (3.2 mi) northwest in the Lagrange (township), up to Bacon Creek (from the east);
- 10.6 kilometres (6.6 mi) northwest, crossing a swamp in the end zone segment, up to the outlet of Lake North (from the north);
- 5.5 kilometres (3.4 mi) west, crossing a marsh area at the start of the segment, up to the outlet of Lake Lavoie (from the north);
- 2.4 kilometres (1.5 mi) southwest up to the confluence of the South Causapscal River (from the southeast);
- 0.7 kilometres (0.43 mi) southwest up to the limit of Casault (township);
- 4.0 kilometres (2.5 mi) west in the Casault (township), collecting the waters of Gun Creek, up to the boundary of Blais (township);
- 5.2 kilometres (3.2 mi) southwest in Blais (township), collecting the waters of Pelletier stream and the discharge of Lake Bergeron, up to Casault River, which is the discharge (from the southwest) of Lake Casault (length: 1.1 kilometres (0.68 mi); height: 344 metres (1,129 ft)) and Lake Causapscal (length: 1.8 kilometres (1.1 mi); height: 344 metres (1,129 ft)). Note: These two lakes are separated by a narrow strip of land.

Lower course of the river (segment of 29.8 kilometres (18.5 mi))

- 8.0 kilometres (5.0 mi) south, forming a detour to the west, up to the Marais Creek;
- 1.4 kilometres (0.87 mi) southwest up to the limit of Casault (township);
- 7.4 kilometres (4.6 mi) to the southwest in the unorganized territory of Lac-Casault (Casault (ownship)), up to the limit of Saint-Alexandre-des-Lacs;
- 1.5 kilometres (0.93 mi) south in Saint-Alexandre-des-Lacs, up to the La Verendrye stream (from the east);
- 1.9 kilometres (1.2 mi) southward up to the boundary of the city of Causapscal;
- 3.0 kilometres (1.9 mi) south in the city of Causapscal, up to the Four Miles stream (from the east);
- 6.6 kilometres (4.1 mi) southwest, in a deep valley, passing south of the pumping station of the city, then under the bridge of Saint-Jacques Street in the heart of the city of Causapscal and ends a hundred meters further west on the east bank of the Matapedia River.

This confluence is located:

- 8.3 kilometres (5.2 mi) southeast of the mouth of Salmon Lake which is crossed through by Matapedia River;
- 49.4 kilometres (30.7 mi) northwest of the confluence of the Matapedia River;
- 114.4 kilometres (71.1 mi) northwest of the bridge crossing over the Restigouche River linking the city of Campbellton (in New Brunswick) and the village of Pointe-à-la-Croix (in Quebec).

== Fish and wildlife ==
The Causapscal River is famous for salmon sport fishing by wading and/or by canoe. The river has 31 kilometres (19 mi) open to fishing, divided into 25 salmon pools in two fishing quota sectors.

The Causapscal River contains large Atlantic salmon specimens that can weigh up to 55 pounds (25 kg). According to GRRMP, between 450 and 600 salmon go up the river annually. The river is divided in two sectors for fishing quotas. The first contains 11 pools and extends 11 kilometres (6.8 mi). The second sector contains 14 pools and extends 20 kilometres (12 mi). There can be four poles each day in each sector. Access rights are drawn.

Salmon pools	Municipality
Sector 1
2nd Mille	Causapscal
3rd Mille	Causapscal
4th Mille	Causapscal
Bas Jumeau (Lower Twin)	Causapscal
Jumeau	Causapscal
Des Aulnes	Causapscal
Du Vieux Camp	Causapscal
De la Grande Grève	Causapscal
De l'Île du 7e Mille	Causapscal
Du Pont du Huit-Mille	Causapscal
De l'Île du 7e Mille	Causapscal
Sector 2
De la Dernière Chance (From Last Chance)	Causapscal
Du Grand Remous	Causapscal
Neese	Causapscal
Potvin	Lac-Casault
Florence	Lac-Casault
Castonguay	Lac-Casault
Du 11e Mille	Lac-Casault
Du Bateau	Lac-Casault
Des Chutes	Lac-Casault
White Horse	Lac-Casault
Du Pont des Falls	Lac-Casault
Du Camp Draveurs	Lac-Casault
Bas Martel	Lac-Casault
Martel	Lac-Casault

== Toponymy ==
The term Causapscal is related to a dozen toponyms in the Matapedia Valley.

The toponym "Causapscal River" was officialized on December 5, 1968 by Commission de toponymie du Québec (Quebec Place Names Board).

== See also ==
Media related to Category:Causapscal, River at Wikimedia Commons

=== Related articles ===
- Causapscal Lake
- Causapscal, a city
- Matapedia Valley
- La Matapédia Regional County Municipality(MRC)
- Bas-Saint-Laurent, administrative region
- South Causapscal River
- Casault River

=== External links ===
- (in French) La Corporation de Gestion des Rivières Matapédia et Patapédia (CGRMP)
- (in French) Conseil du Bassin versant de la rivière Matapédia
- (in French) Saumon Québec - Rivière Causapscal

Catégorie:Cours d'eau du Bas-Saint-Laurent
