= Jean Brillant =

Canadian recipient of the Victoria Cross

Jean Baptiste Arthur Brillant VC MC
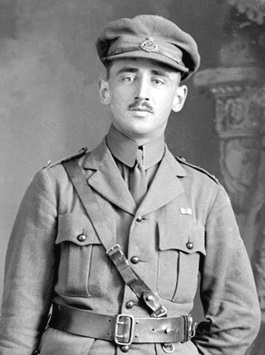
- Born: 15 March 1890; Assemetquagan, (Routhierville), Quebec
- Died: 10 August 1918 (aged 28); Meharicourt, France
- Burial place: Villers-Bretonneux Military Cemetery, Fouilloy
- Military career
- Allegiance: Canada
- Branch: Canadian Expeditionary Force
- Service years: 1916–1918
- Rank: Lieutenant
- Units: 22nd Battalion, CEF
- Conflicts: First World War: Battle of Amiens †
- Awards: Victoria Cross; Military Cross

Jean Baptiste Arthur Brillant VC MC (15 March 1890 – 10 August 1918) was a Canadian recipient of the Victoria Cross, the highest and most prestigious award for gallantry in the face of the enemy that can be awarded to British and Commonwealth forces.

== Background ==
Brillant was born on 15 March 1890 in Assemetquagan, Routhierville, Quebec, the son of Joseph Brillant, a railway maintenance worker, and Rose-de-Lima Raiche.

Brillant studied at the College of Saint Joseph in Memramcook, New Brunswick, and then at the Séminaire de Rimouski in 1904–1905. He later worked as a telegraph operator for a railway.

== World War I ==
Brillant volunteered for service with the 89th (Temiscouata and Rimouski) Regiment (from 1920 the Fusiliers du S^{t}-Laurent) and held the rank of lieutenant. In 1916, eager to join the Canadian Expeditionary Force, he declared 13 years' service with this unit. On 20 March 1916 Brillant left his job as a telegrapher. After about six months’ training in Valcartier, he embarked for England with the 189th on 27 September 1916; on disembarking at Liverpool on 6 October, he was assigned to the 69th Infantry Battalion. He left for France on 27 October and joined the 22e Battalion (Canadien Francais) at Bully-Grenay.

During the night of 27/28 May 1918, in the vicinity of Boiry-Becquerelle, Brillant was called to lead a group of volunteers to help silence an outpost defended by about 50 men. Troops charged the enemy position, cut through the barbed wire protecting it, and took it. He was injured in the attack, yet captured enemy soldiers who had "valuable information". Remaining in action that day despite his wounds, Brillant would be awarded the Military Cross on 16 September 1918.

He was awarded the VC for his actions on 8/9 August east of Meharicourt, France the first and second days of the Battle of Amiens. He died the next day on 10 August 1918.

=== VC citation ===
For most conspicuous bravery and outstanding devotion to duty when in charge of a company which he led in attack during two days with absolute fearlessness and extraordinary ability and initiative, the extent of the advance being twelve miles. On the first day of operations shortly after the attack had begun, his company's left flank was held up by an enemy machine gun. Lt. Brillant rushed and captured the machine-gun, personally killing two of the enemy crew. Whilst doing this, he was wounded but refused to leave his command. Later on the same day, his company was held up by heavy machine-gun fire. He reconnoitred the ground personally, organised a party of two platoons and rushed straight for the machine-gun nest. Here 150 enemy and fifteen machine-guns were captured. Lt. Brillant personally killing five of the enemy, and being wounded a second time. He had this wound dressed immediately, and again refused to leave his company. Subsequently this gallant officer detected a field gun firing on his men over open sights. He immediately organised and led a "rushing" party towards the gun. After progressing about 600 yards, he was again seriously wounded. In spite of this third wound, he continued to advance for some 200 yards more, when he fell unconscious from exhaustion and loss of blood. Lt. Brillant's wonderful example throughout the day inspired his men with an enthusiasm and dash which largely contributed towards the success of the operations.

— The London Gazette (No. 30922), 27 September 1918

== Grave ==
Brillant is buried at Villers-Bretonneux Military Cemetery, Fouilloy, France located 15 km (9 miles) east of Amiens. (Plot VIa, Row B, Grave 20). His gravestone bears the inscription:

FILS DE JOSEPH BRILLANT
ENROLE VOLONTAIREMENT A RIMOUSKI, PROVINCE DE QUEBEC
TOMBE GLORIEUSEMENT SUR LE SOL DE SES AIEUX
BON SANG NE PEUT MENTIR

which (roughly) translates to:

SON OF JOSEPH BRILLANT
VOLUNTARILY ENLISTED IN RIMOUSKI, PROVINCE OF QUEBEC
FELL GLORIOUSLY ON THE SOIL OF HIS FOREFATHERS
GOOD BLOOD DOES NOT LIE (a French expression meaning that he bore the positive traits of his ancestors)

His medals are held at the Royal 22^{e} Regiment Museum in Quebec City.

A monument to Jean Brillant was erected in 1970 in Montreal, located in the park which also bears his name.
