= Lac au Saumon (Matapédia) =

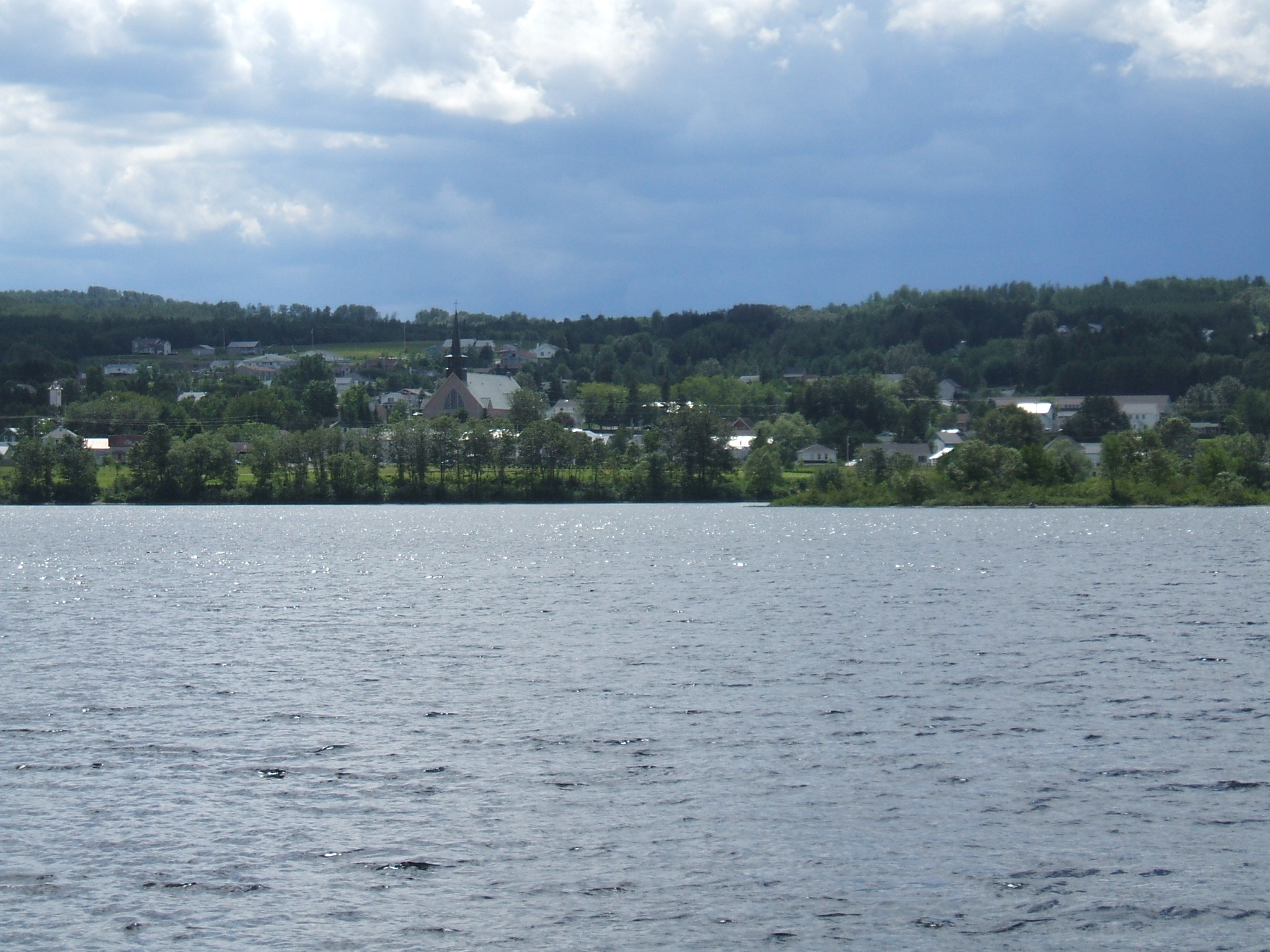

- Location within Quebec
- Location: Bas-Saint-Laurent, Quebec, Canada
- Coordinates: 48°25′12″N 67°19′47″W
- Type: Freshwater lake
- River sources: Matapédia River
- Surface elevation: 500 m (1,600 ft)

Lac au Saumon (Salmon Lake) is a fresh water body located in the Matapédia Valley. It is situated in La Matapédia Regional County Municipality in the Bas-Saint-Laurent region of Quebec, Canada.
