= Thomas-Louis Tremblay =

Canadian army officer (1886–1951)

Brigadier-General Thomas-Louis Tremblay CB, CMG, DSO, ED
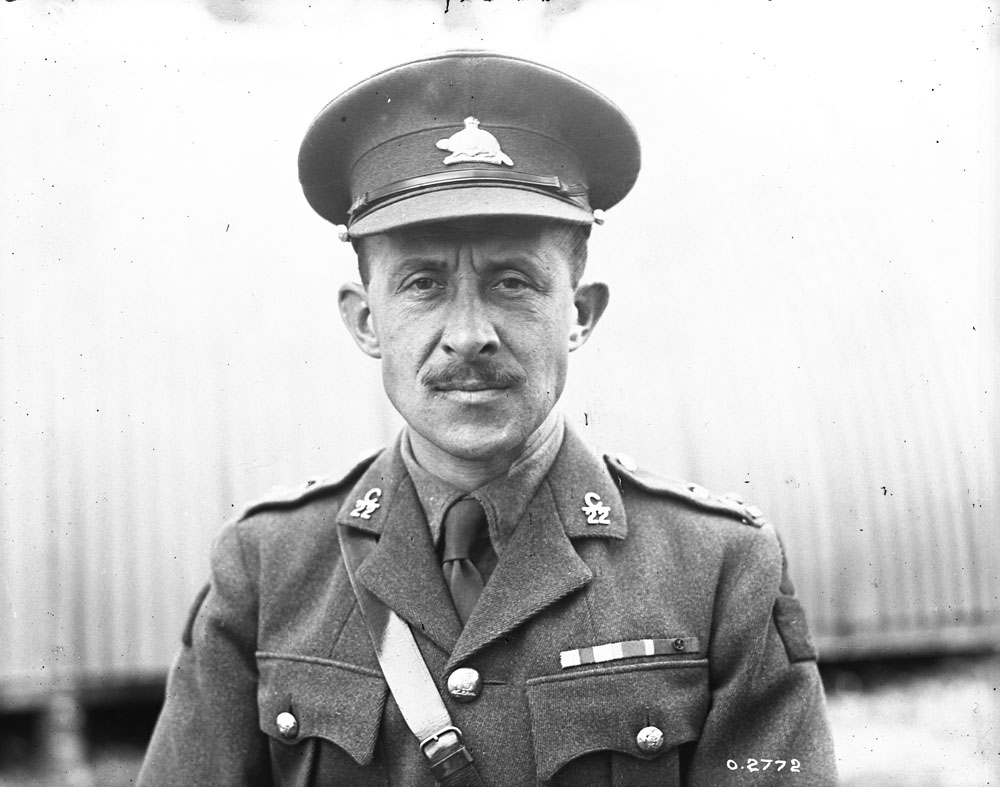
- Born: May 16, 1886 Chicoutimi, Quebec, Canada
- Died: March 28, 1951 (aged 64)
- Commands: 22nd Battalion (French Canadian), CEF; 5th Canadian Infantry Brigade
- Alma mater: Royal Military College of Canada

Brigadier-General Thomas-Louis Tremblay, CB, CMG, DSO, ED (May 16, 1886 – March 28, 1951) was a Canadian Army officer and engineer. One of the Army's few senior French-Canadian senior officers, Tremblay held field commands during the First World War and posts at home during the Second World War.

== Early life and career ==
Born in Chicoutimi, the son of a sea captain, Tremblay grew up in Quebec City. Attracted to military life, he served in a militia artillery unit, before enrolling in the Royal Military College in 1904, one of only 19 French Canadians who attended the college between 1900 and 1914. He graduated in 1907 with an engineering diploma, the “Best Man at all Arms” award and the Lt.-Col. Ernest F. Wurtele Gymnastic Shield.

After graduating from the college, Tremblay worked as an engineer for National Transcontinental Railway and as a surveyor for the Quebec provincial government. He also served in the 18th Saguenay Regiment.

== First World War ==
At the outbreak of the First World War, Tremblay first served in the 1st Canadian Divisional Ammunition Column in an administrative capacity. In 1915, Tremblay joined the Canadian Expeditionary Force as a major in the 22nd Battalion (French Canadian), CEF, the only entirely French-speaking battalion in the CEF. Serving as second-in-command to Colonel Frédéric-Mondelet Gaudet, Tremblay assumed command of the 22nd in 1916 and was promoted to lieutenant-colonel.

In September 1916, Tremblay led the 22nd in the Battle of Flers–Courcelette, where it distinguished itself. Tremblay then relinquished command to receive medical treatment for a pre-existing condition in England. On resuming command in 1917, he found a unit beset by disciplinary problems, but managed to re-establish discipline. He led the 22nd at the Battle of Vimy Ridge, the Battle of Hill 70, the Battle of Passchendaele, and the Battle of Amiens. In 1918, Tremblay was appointed as commanding officer of the 5th Canadian Infantry Brigade, holding the command until 1919.

For his services, Tremblay was appointed a CB, a CMG, and a DSO, and was mentioned in despatches. He was also appointed an Officer of the French Legion of Honour.

== Subsequent life and career ==
After the war, Tremblay returned to civilian life and became chief engineer and manager of the Port of Quebec. He became honorary colonel of the Royal 22e Régiment, the successor of the 22nd Battalion, in 1931.

In 1940, he was once again offered command of the 5th Canadian Infantry Brigade, but declined. He instead served as Inspector General for Eastern Canada from 1942 until his resignation in 1946. He also served as Assistant Deputy Director with the National Selection Service.
