= Zec Casault =

- Location within Quebec
- Location: La Matapédia, Avignon Regional County Municipality
- Coordinates: 48°18′00″N 66°53′00″W
- Area: 838 km^{2} (324 sq mi)
- Established: 2007
- Governing body: Corporation d'exploitation des ressources fauniques Vallée-de-la-Matapédia

The zec Casault is a "zone d'exploitation contrôlée" (controlled harvesting zone) (ZEC), in La Matapedia Regional County Municipality and d'Avignon Regional County Municipality, Quebec, Canada. The ZEC is located even in administrative regions of the Bas-Saint-Laurent and Gaspésie-Îles-de-la-Madeleine.

The territory of hunting and recreative fishing of 838 km2 is managed by the "Corporation d'exploitation des ressources fauniques Vallée-de-la-Matapédia" (Corporation operating Wildlife Vallée-de-la-Matapedia). The administrative offices are located in ZEC Causapscal.

== Toponymy ==
The name of the ZEC comes from the Cassault Township Casault, which itself was named in honor of Louis-Napoléon Casault who was a member of Montmagny in the legislature of the Province of Canada from 1854 to 1857 and MP in Bellechasse to the House of Commons of Canada from 1867 to 1870.

== History ==
ZEC Casault was established in 1978, following the abolition of private clubs. ZEC had 809 members in 2006.

== Geography ==
Zec Casault has an area of 838 km2 located in the administrative regions of Bas-Saint-Laurent and Gaspésie-Îles-de-la-Madeleine; and La Matapedia Regional County Municipality and Avignon Regional County Municipality. Its territory is included in the municipality of Saint-Alexandre-des-Lacs and non-organized Lac-Casault of Rivière-Nouvelle by Ruisseau-des-Mineurs and Routhierville.

Zec shares its boundaries with Matane Wildlife Reserve and by Dunière Wildlife Reserve in the north and the Wildlife Reserve Rivers-Matapedia-Patapédia west.

== Wildlife ==
ZEC Casault authorizes hunting small animal such as the Hare, the ruffed grouse and coyote. In terms of big animal, Zec houses the moose, deer and black bear. For its part, the most popular fishing is that of the brook trout.

== See also ==
- Lac-Casault, territoire non-organisé
- Matapedia Valley
- Avignon Regional County Municipality
- Bas-Saint-Laurent, administrative region
- Gaspésie-Îles-de-la-Madeleine
- Zone d'exploitation contrôlée (Controlled Harvesting Zone) (ZEC)
