= Causapscal =

- City

- Coat of arms

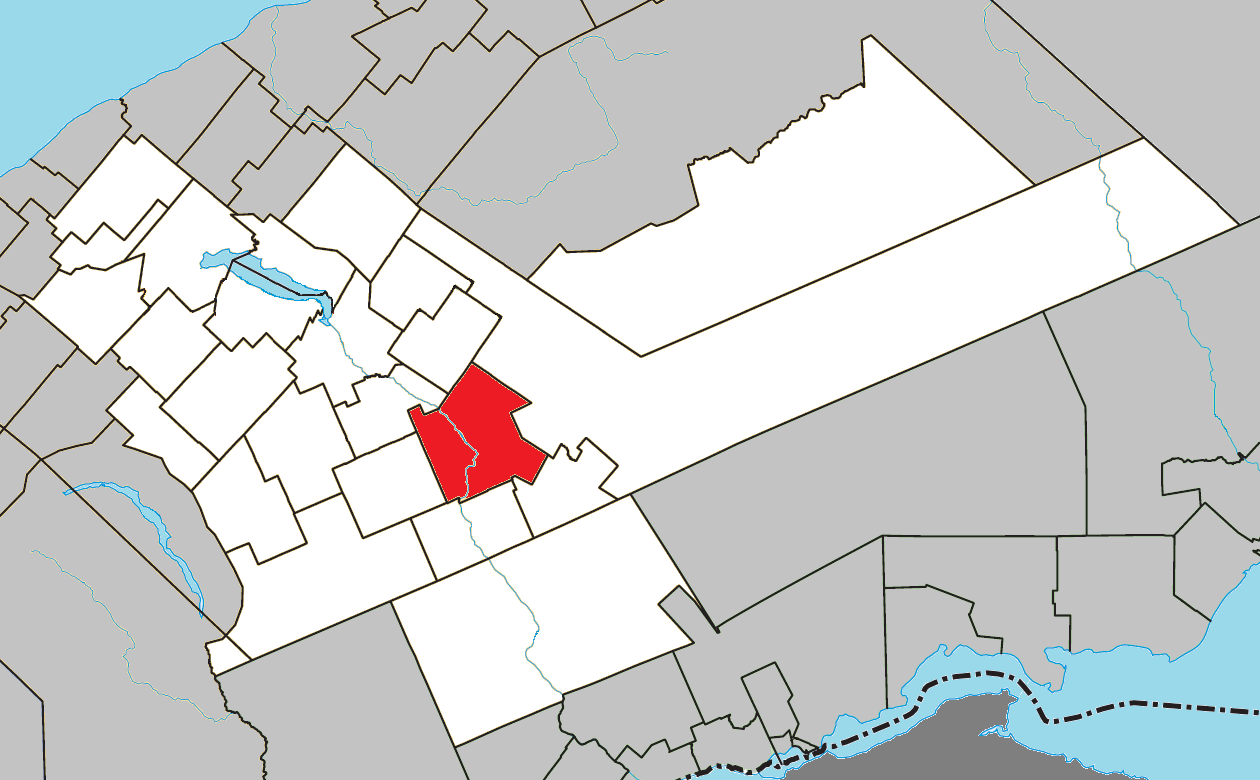
- Location within La Matapédia RCM

- Location in eastern Quebec
- Coordinates: 48°22′N 67°14′W
- Country: Canada
- Province: Quebec
- Region: Bas-Saint-Laurent
- RCM: La Matapédia
- Constituted: December 31, 1997

Government
  - Mayor: Odile Roy
  - Fed. riding: Rimouski-Neigette—Mitis—Matapédia—Les Basques
  - Prov. riding: Matane-Matapédia-Mitis

Area
  - Total: 162.34 km^{2} (62.68 sq mi)
  - Land: 161.61 km^{2} (62.40 sq mi)

Population (2021)
  - Total: 2,147
  - Density: 13.3/km^{2} (34/sq mi)
  - Change 2016-21: ▼6.8%
  - Dwellings: 1,140
- Time zone: UTC−5 (EST)
  - Summer (DST): UTC−4 (EDT)
- Postal code(s): G0J 1J0
- Area codes: 418 and 581
- Highways: R-132
- Website: www.causapscal.net

Causapscal (/koʊˈzɑːpskæl/; French: [kozapskal]) is a city in the Canadian province of Quebec, located in La Matapédia Regional County Municipality. It is located at the confluence of the Matapédia and Causapscal Rivers, along Quebec Route 132, approximately halfway between Mont-Joli and Campbellton, New Brunswick. It is served by the Causapscal railway station (the town can be reached by Via Rail on the named train The Ocean, between Montreal and Halifax) and the Causapscal Airport.

The city's name is taken from the geographic township of Casupscull (proclaimed in 1864), which in turn is derived from the Mi'kmaq word Goesôpsiag (or Gesapsgel, Gesôpsgigel), meaning "stony bottom", "swift water", or "rocky point", likely referring to the rocky river bed of the Causapscal River.

== History ==
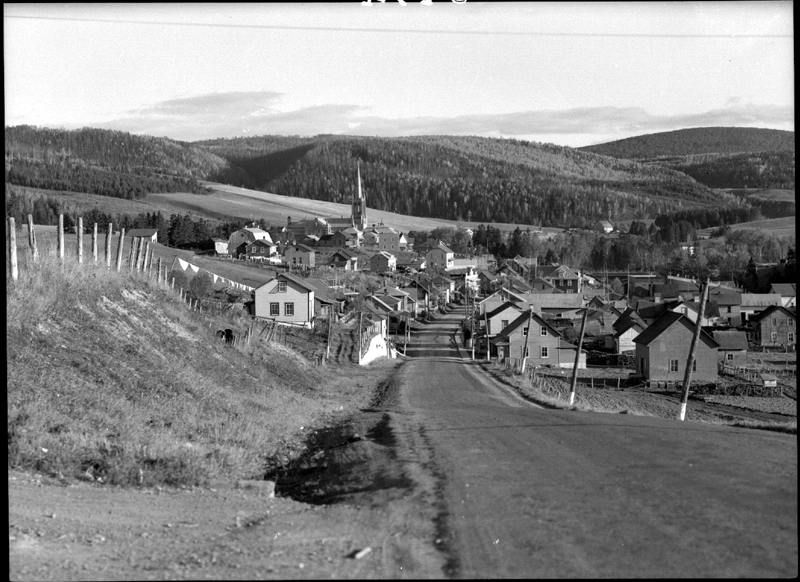
Village of Causapscal, 1940

Development of the place followed the construction of the Intercolonial Railway in the 1860s. In 1870, the Parish of Saint-Jacques-le-Majeur was established, and the following year, the post office opened.

In 1897, the Parish Municipality of Saint-Jacques-le-Majeur-de-Causapscal was incorporated, named after the parish and the geographic township. In 1928, the village itself separated from the parish municipality and was incorporated as the Village Municipality of Causapscal. In 1957, the parish municipality lost more territory when the Municipality of Sainte-Marguerite was formed. In 1965, Causapscal gained ville (city/town) status.

On December 31, 1997, the Parish Municipality of Saint-Jacques-le-Majeur-de-Causapscal was amalgamated into the City of Causapscal.

== Geography ==
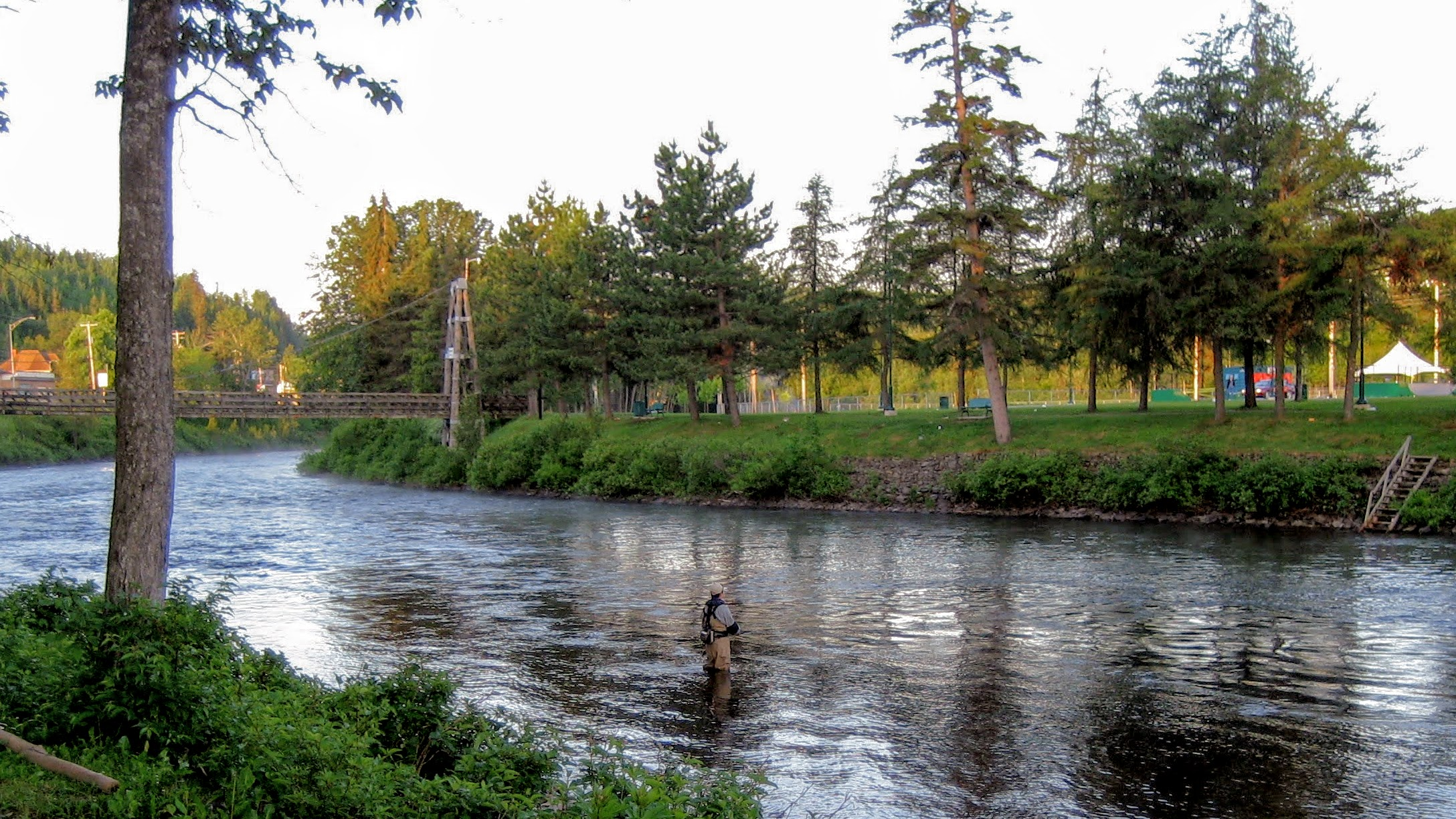
Matapedia River at Causapscal

Causapscal is located in the Matapédia Valley at the confluence of the Matapédia and Causapscal Rivers.

=== Climate ===
Climate data for Causapscal (1991−2020 normals, extremes 1913–present)
Month	Jan	Feb	Mar	Apr	May	Jun	Jul	Aug	Sep	Oct	Nov	Dec	Year
Record high °C (°F)	12.5 (54.5)	14.5 (58.1)	24.0 (75.2)	29.4 (84.9)	34.3 (93.7)	36.0 (96.8)	35.6 (96.1)	34.4 (93.9)	32.8 (91.0)	27.0 (80.6)	23.0 (73.4)	14.0 (57.2)	36.0 (96.8)
Mean daily maximum °C (°F)	−8.2 (17.2)	−6.2 (20.8)	−0.1 (31.8)	7.1 (44.8)	15.7 (60.3)	21.2 (70.2)	23.8 (74.8)	22.9 (73.2)	17.9 (64.2)	10.2 (50.4)	2.5 (36.5)	−4.2 (24.4)	8.6 (47.5)
Daily mean °C (°F)	−13.9 (7.0)	−12.6 (9.3)	−6.4 (20.5)	1.8 (35.2)	8.9 (48.0)	14.4 (57.9)	17.2 (63.0)	16.1 (61.0)	11.7 (53.1)	5.4 (41.7)	−1.1 (30.0)	−9.0 (15.8)	2.7 (36.9)
Mean daily minimum °C (°F)	−19.2 (−2.6)	−18.4 (−1.1)	−12.0 (10.4)	−3.9 (25.0)	2.1 (35.8)	7.4 (45.3)	11.1 (52.0)	9.8 (49.6)	5.4 (41.7)	0.6 (33.1)	−5.0 (23.0)	−13.0 (8.6)	−2.9 (26.8)
Record low °C (°F)	−44.5 (−48.1)	−41.7 (−43.1)	−38.0 (−36.4)	−28.0 (−18.4)	−12.8 (9.0)	−6.0 (21.2)	−0.6 (30.9)	−3.0 (26.6)	−7.8 (18.0)	−14.0 (6.8)	−27.2 (−17.0)	−40.0 (−40.0)	−44.5 (−48.1)
Average precipitation mm (inches)	68.1 (2.68)	59.6 (2.35)	60.7 (2.39)	60.8 (2.39)	86.2 (3.39)	93.9 (3.70)	125.2 (4.93)	92.3 (3.63)	92.7 (3.65)	90.8 (3.57)	95.9 (3.78)	76.8 (3.02)	1,002.9 (39.48)
Average rainfall mm (inches)	12.0 (0.47)	4.5 (0.18)	16.3 (0.64)	44.3 (1.74)	84.8 (3.34)	93.9 (3.70)	125.2 (4.93)	92.3 (3.63)	92.7 (3.65)	87.0 (3.43)	59.5 (2.34)	21.4 (0.84)	733.8 (28.89)
Average snowfall cm (inches)	56.1 (22.1)	55.1 (21.7)	44.5 (17.5)	16.7 (6.6)	1.4 (0.6)	0.0 (0.0)	0.0 (0.0)	0.0 (0.0)	0.0 (0.0)	3.8 (1.5)	36.5 (14.4)	55.4 (21.8)	269.4 (106.1)
Average precipitation days (≥ 0.2 mm)	15.2	13.2	13.2	12.6	16.0	15.3	16.6	18.1	18.9	18.2	16.9	16.4	190.7
Average rainy days (≥ 0.2 mm)	1.6	1.4	3.4	10.2	15.8	15.3	16.6	18.1	18.9	17.6	9.4	2.8	131.1
Average snowy days (≥ 0.2 cm)	14.4	12.2	10.8	4.4	0.5	0.0	0.0	0.0	0.0	1.3	9.6	14.8	68.0
Mean monthly sunshine hours	56.0	87.1	125.5	152.8	175.9	201.8	221.8	194.5	144.9	97.1	39.4	24.1	1,520.9
Source: Environment and Climate Change Canada (precipitation/rainfall/snow 1981–2010, sun 1951–1980)

== Demographics ==
In the 2021 Census of Population conducted by Statistics Canada, Causapscal had a population of 2,147 living in 1,061 of its 1,140 total private dwellings, a change of −6.8% from its 2016 population of 2,304. With a land area of 161.61 km^{2} (62.40 sq mi), it had a population density of 13.3/km^{2} (34.4/sq mi) in 2021.

Canada census – Causapscal community profile

	2021	2016	2011
Population	2,147 (-6.8% from 2016)	2,304 (-6.3% from 2011)	2,458 (0.0% from 2006)
Land area	161.61 km^{2} (62.40 sq mi)	161.60 km^{2} (62.39 sq mi)	161.84 km^{2} (62.49 sq mi)
Population density	13.3/km^{2} (34/sq mi)	14.3/km^{2} (37/sq mi)	15.2/km^{2} (39/sq mi)
Median age	54.8 (M: 54.0, F: 55.2)	52.4 (M: 51.4, F: 53.6)	49.5 (M: 49.1, F: 49.9)
Private dwellings	1,140 (total) 1,061 (occupied)	1,162 (total)	1,219 (total)
Median household income	$52,000	$44,032	$37,135

References: 2021 2016 2011

Historical census populations – Causapscal

Year	Pop.	±%
1931	1,390	—
1941	1,545	+11.2%
1951	2,609	+68.9%
1956	2,957	+13.3%
1961	3,463	+17.1%
1966	3,210	−7.3%

Year	Pop.	±%
1971	2,965	−7.6%
1976	2,743	−7.5%
1981	2,501	−8.8%
1986	2,339	−6.5%
1991	2,160	−7.7%
1996	2,080	−3.7%

Year	Pop.	±%
2001	2,634	+26.6%
2006	2,458	−6.7%
2011	2,458	+0.0%
2016	2,304	−6.3%
2021	2,147	−6.8%

Source: Statistics Canada

Canada Census Mother Tongue - Causapscal, Quebec
Census	Total	French			English			French & English			Other		
Year	Responses	Count	Trend	Pop %	Count	Trend	Pop %	Count	Trend	Pop %	Count	Trend	Pop %
2021	2,145	2,105	▼7.3%	98.1%	10	▼60.0%	0.5%	25	▲400.0%	1.2%	5	0.0%	0.2%
2016	2,305	2,270	▼6.4%	98.5%	25	▲25.0%	1.1%	5	▲ n/a%	0.2%	5	0.0%	0.2%
2011	2,460	2,425	▲0.4%	98.6%	20	▲100.0%	0.8%	0	0.0%	0.0%	5	▲ n/a%	0.2%
2006	2,425	2,415	▼6.6%	99.6%	10	▲ n/a%	0.4%	0	0.0%	0.0%	0	0.0%	0.0%
2001	2,595	2,590	▲27.6%	99.8%	0	▼100.0%	0.0%	0	0.0%	0.0%	0	0.0%	0.0%
1996	2,055	2,030	n/a	98.8%	15	n/a	0.7%	0	n/a	0.0%	0	n/a	0.0%

== Government ==
Town hall of Causapscal

Municipal council:

- Mayor: Odile Roy
- Councillors: Loiselle Tremblay, Denis Viel, Harold Dancause, Jean-Marie Kabera, Stéphane Thériault, Rodrigue Boulianne

List of former mayors:

- Nérée Guérette (1928–1944, 1945–1947)
- Oscar Bouchard (1944)
- Arthur Rioux (1944–1945)
- Félix Boudreau (1947–1949)
- Aurèle Bouchard (1949–1960)
- Georges Barriault (1960–1964)
- Gérard Laflamme (1964–1974)
- Yvon Desrosiers (1974–1982)
- Ferdinand Didier (1982–1986)
- Jean Marie Abud (1986–1994)
- Raymond Hort (1994–1997)
- Réjean Lagacé (1997)
- Denis Bastien (1997–2001, 2005–2008)
- Jacques Parent (2001–2005)
- Mario Côté (2008–2017)
- André Fournier (2017–2021)
- Réjean (Félix) Lagacé (2021–2023)
- Odile Roy (2023–present)

== Notable people ==
- Suzanne Bergeron (June 23, 1930 – November 19, 1998), painter
- Maurice "Mom" Boucher (born June 21, 1953 - died July 10, 2022), Canadian outlaw biker, former President of the Hells Angels' Montreal chapter.
- Jean-Guy Donat Morissette (born December 16, 1937 - died March 21, 2011), goaltender for the Montreal Canadiens in the 1963–64 season
- Olivier Roy (born July 12, 1991), goaltender in the ICE Hockey League.

== See also ==
- List of cities in Quebec
