= Routhierville =

- Unorganized territory
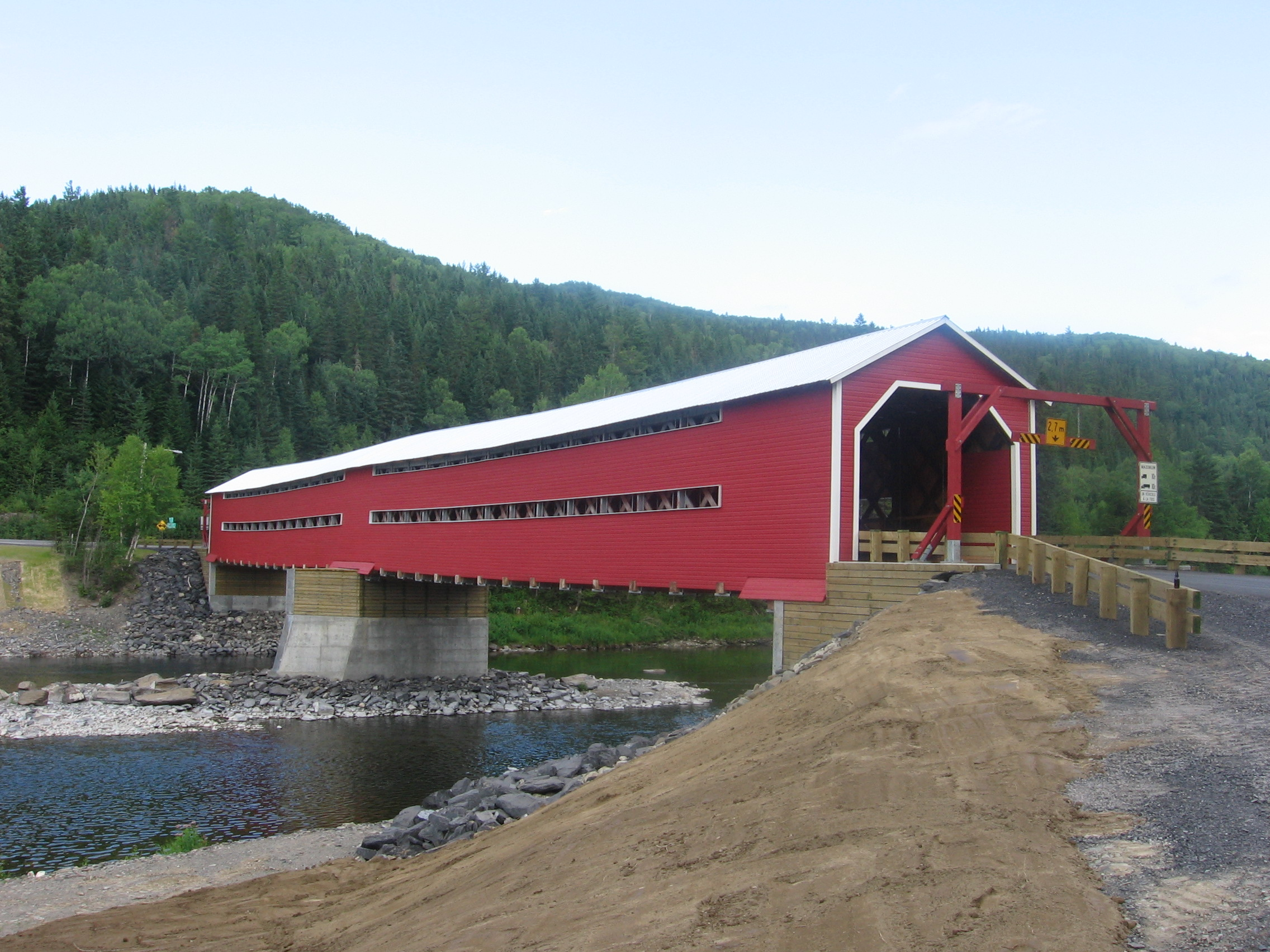

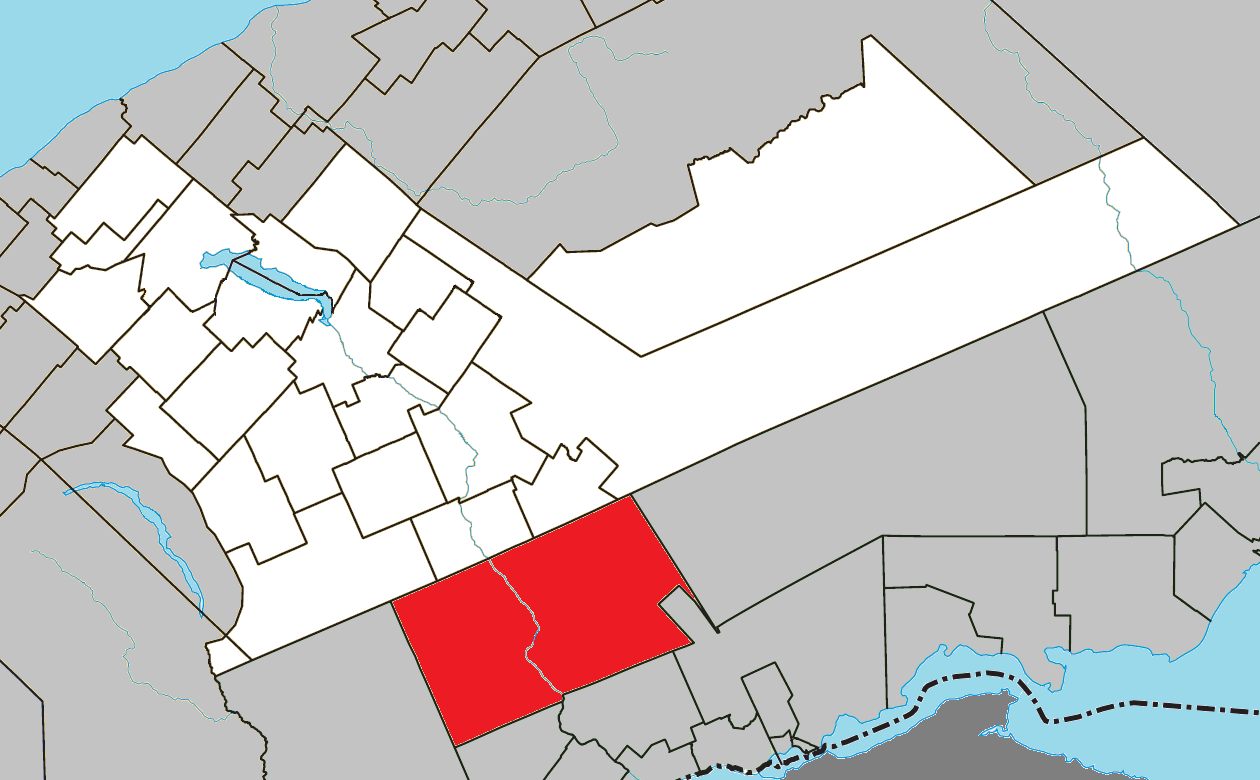
- Location within La Matapédia RCM

- Location in eastern Quebec
- Coordinates: 48°11′N 67°09′W
- Country: Canada
- Province: Quebec
- Region: Bas-Saint-Laurent
- RCM: La Matapédia
- Constituted: unspecified

Government
  - Fed. riding: Rimouski-Neigette—Mitis—Matapédia—Les Basques
  - Prov. riding: Matane-Matapédia-Mitis

Area
  - Total: 630.52 km^{2} (243.45 sq mi)
  - Land: 626.26 km^{2} (241.80 sq mi)

Population (2021)
  - Total: 20
  - Density: 0/km^{2} (0/sq mi)
  - Change 2016-21: ▲11.1%
  - Dwellings: 15
- Time zone: UTC−05:00 (EST)
  - Summer (DST): UTC−04:00 (EDT)
- Postal code FSA: G0J
- Area codes: 418 and 581
- Highways: R-132

Routhierville (French pronunciation: [ʁutjevil]) is an unorganized territory in the Bas-Saint-Laurent region of Quebec, Canada. The territory is bisected by the Matapédia River and Quebec Route 132 that runs parallel to it. There are two hamlets in the territory: the eponymous Routhierville (48°10′57″N 67°08′57″W) and Milnikek (48°08′21″N 67°09′11″W).

The community of Routhierville is located on the west bank of the Matapédia River along the Canadian National Railway that was originally constructed as the Intercolonial Railway in the 1860s, while its train station was built in 1878. The community used to be called Assametquagan, meaning "appearing at the detour," but was renamed after station master Alphonse Routhier (1875–1958).

The community of Routhierville is accessible from Route 132 with a covered bridge over the Matapédia River, built in 1931 to replace a ferry. This 78.5-metre-long (258 ft) and 6.3-metre-wide (21 ft) bridge was classified as a historic monument on October 1, 2009, and rebuilt in 2011.

== Demographics ==
Historical census populations – Routhierville

Year	Pop.	±%
1981	75	—
1986	64	−14.7%
1991	40	−37.5%
1996	24	−40.0%
2001	25	+4.2%

Year	Pop.	±%
2006	5	−80.0%
2011	15	+200.0%
2016	18	+20.0%
2021	20	+11.1%

Source: Statistics Canada

Private dwellings occupied by usual residents (2021): 11 (total dwellings: 15)

== Notable people ==
- Jean Brillant - Routhierville born recipient of the Victoria Cross for actions during the Battle of Amiens during the First World War

== See also ==
- List of unorganized territories in Quebec
