= Matapedia River =

Matapedia River French: Rivière Matapédia
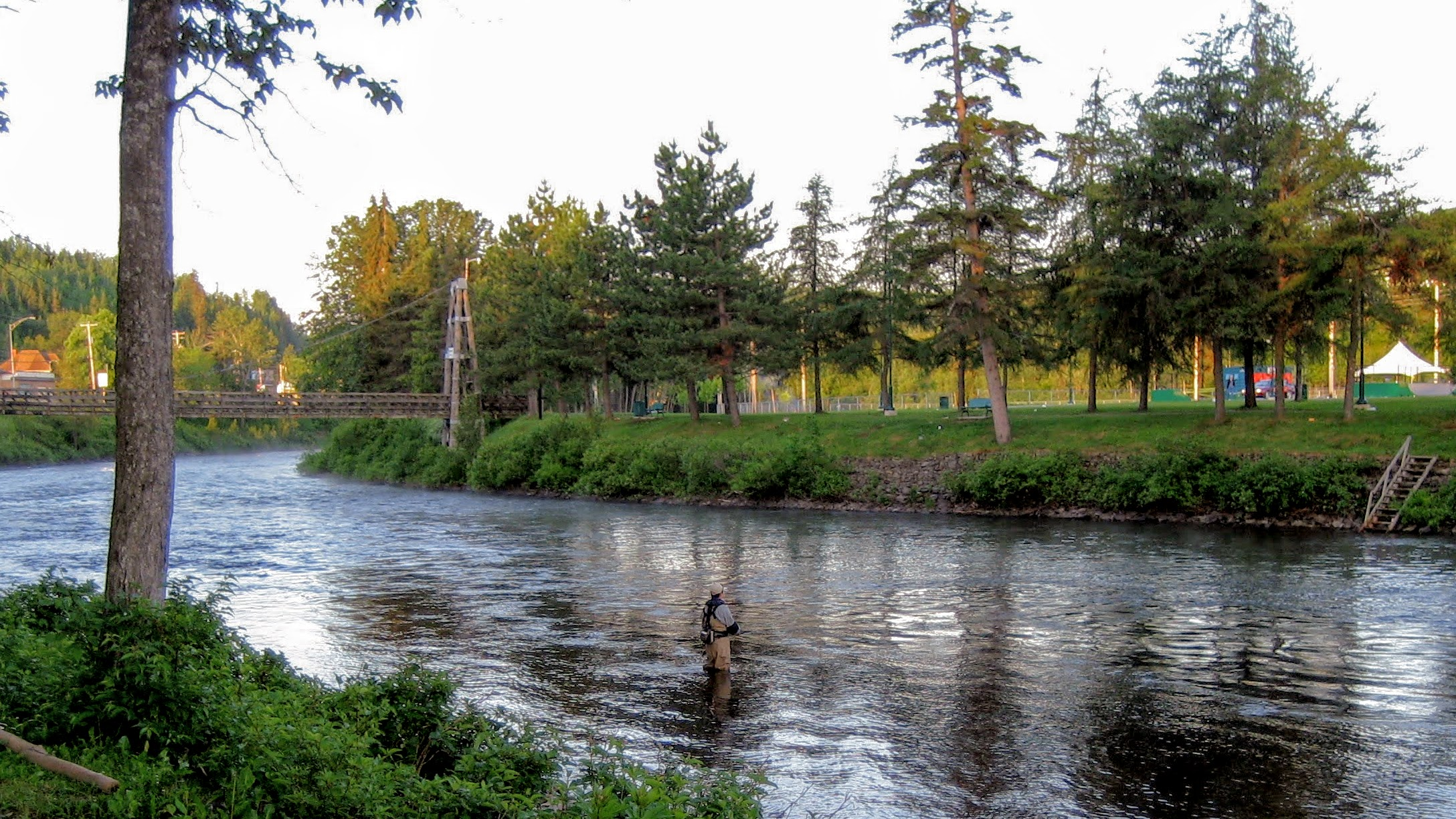
- Salmon fishing on the Matapedia River at "La fosse Les Fourches" (Forks pits)

Location
- Country: Canada
- Province: Quebec

Physical characteristics
- Source
  - location: Matapedia Lake, Quebec
  - coordinates: 48°29′32″N 67°26′57″W
  - elevation: 158 kilometres (98 mi)
- Mouth
  - location: Restigouche River, Quebec
  - coordinates: 47°58′17″N 66°56′32″W
  - elevation: 8 metres (26 ft)
- Length: 112.7 km (70.0 mi)
- Basin size: 3,834 kilometres (2,382.34 mi)

Basin features
- Tributaries
  - left: (from confluence) Lagacé brook, Oilmour brook, Kaine brook, Clark brook, Assemetquagan River, Gerrer brook, ruisseau de la Montagne (Mountain brook), McCormick brook, Fraser brook, Lajoie brook, Laville brook, Causapscal River, Boudreau brook, Pearson brook, Sableux brook.
  - right: (from confluence) Indian brook, Saint-Alexis brook, Robitaille brook, rivière du Moulin (Matapédia River), Milnikek River, Doyle brook, rivière Matalie, ruisseau de l'Aqueduc, ruisseau des Sauvages, rivière Humqui, Tobégote River, Saint-Pierre River, Sayabec River.

The Matapedia River (French: Rivière Matapédia, pronounced [ʁivjɛʁ matapedja]) is a river in the Matapedia Valley in the province of Quebec, Canada. It runs on 65 kilometres (40 mi) from Matapedia Lake down to the village of Matapédia where it empties into the left bank of Restigouche River on the provincial border of New Brunswick.

This freshwater course forms a natural border between the administrative regions of Bas-Saint-Laurent and Gaspésie-Îles-de-la-Madeleine. The river is a North South divide in the Notre Dame Mountains that characterize the relief of the Gaspé Peninsula. The Matapedia River basin drains an area of about 3,900 kilometres (2,423.35 mi). Matapedia River is often called the Salmon Capital .

From the South side of Matapedia Lake and going to the South, the route 132 along the river goes on its entire length by the East bank.

The Canadian National Railway passes South of Matapedia Lake continues on the West bank of the river in Causapscal where the bridge at South of the village made the railway cross on the East bank. The track then continues South on 8.5 kilometres (5.3 mi); then passes again in the West Bank via the railway bridge located at 1.1 kilometres (0.68 mi) North of the confluence of the creek Doyle. The railway then rest on the West bank up to the railway bridge at the confluence of the Rivière du Moulin (Matapedia River). From there, the last railway segment passes through the Eastern shore, up to the confluence of the Matapedia River.

== Course ==
Matapedia Lake becomes Matapedia River at Amqui, where it is a meander river for a distance of approximately 15 kilometres (9 mi). It widens into an elongated lake 1 kilometre wide and 7 kilometres (4 mi) long at Lac-au-Saumon before narrowing back to a river below the dam in the village of Causapscal. There, it joins with a major tributary, the Causapscal River, forming a pool that is renowned for its Atlantic salmon. From there, the river continues on until the New Brunswick border, where it empties into the Restigouche River.

The Lake Matapedia (length: 22.0 kilometres (13.7 mi); height: 158 metres (518 ft)) is the head of water of the Matapedia River. This water plan 38 kilometres (23.61 mi) is located in the municipality Matapedia Lake, in Notre Dame Mountains. Its mouth is located in the Southeast to the height of a covered bridge.

The mouth of the Lake Matapedia is located at:

- 87.0 kilometres (54.1 mi) Northwest from the confluence of the Matapedia River;
- 39.7 kilometres (24.7 mi) Southeast of South Coastal Gulf of Saint Lawrence;
- 42.8 kilometres (26.6 mi) South of the bridge route 132 that spans on the Matane River.

From the mouth of the Matapedia Lake, Matapedia River flows over 87.7 kilometres (54.5 mi) as follow:

Higher Courses of the river(segment of 28.5 kilometres (17.7 mi))

- 3.9 kilometres (2.4 mi) to the Southeast, up to the bridge of the city of Amqui of route 195;
- 8.1 kilometres (5.0 mi) to the Southeast, up to the highway bridge;
- 1.6 kilometres (0.99 mi) to the Southeast, with a detour to the Northeast to the Northwest shore of Salmon Lake (Matapédia);
- 5.0 kilometres (3.1 mi) to the Southeast, crossing the Salmon Lake (Matapédia) on its full length;
- 9.9 kilometres (6.2 mi) to the Southeast, to the confluence of the Causapscal River (from the Northeast) which is located on the South side of the village of Causapscal.

Lower course of the river (segment of 59.2 kilometres (36.8 mi))

- 6.3 kilometres (3.9 mi) to the South, up to the highway bridge;
- 6.8 kilometres (4.2 mi) to the South, up to the highway bridge from the village of Sainte-Florence;
- 3.8 kilometres (2.4 mi) Southward up to the boundary of the Assemetquagan (township);
- 8.1 kilometres (5.0 mi) to the south in Assemetquagan (township), up to the highway bridge from the village of Routhierville;
- 6.8 kilometres (4.2 mi) Southward, up to the confluence of the Milnikek River (from the West);
- 7.8 kilometres (4.8 mi) to the Southeast, up to the limit of the Restigouche (township) (East side of the Matapedia River);
- 0.7 kilometres (0.43 mi) to the South, up to the confluence of the Assemetquagan River and the boundary of the Matapedia (township);
- 1.9 kilometres (1.2 mi) to the South, up to the confluence of the Rivière du Moulin (Matapedia River) (from the West);
- 6.3 kilometres (3.9 mi) to the Southeast, up to the confluence of the Clark Creek (from the North);
- 2.2 kilometres (1.4 mi) to the Southeast, up to the bridge of the village of Saint-Alexis-de-Matapédia;
- 8.5 kilometres (5.3 mi) to the Southeast, up to the confluence of the river

The confluence of the Matapedia River flows on the north bank of the Restigouche River. This confluence is located at:

- 19.0 kilometres (11.8 mi) West of the bridge in Campbellton, New Brunswick, at the confluence of the Restigouche River;
- 8.6 kilometres (5.3 mi) Northeast of the confluence of the Patapédia River.

== Etymology ==
Its name may derive from the Mi'kmaq word matapegiag, meaning "river junction", from the parts mata (junction) and pegiag (river), referring to the Matapédia River that crosses the town just before its confluence with the Restigouche River. Another source from the late nineteenth century indicates that the Mi'kmaq named the area Magabegeak which means "roughly flowing". It has also been spelled many different ways over time such as Matapediach, Madapeguia, Matapeguia, Matapediac, Matakpediack, Madapeguia, Metapedia, or Matapediac.

== History ==
During the river's most productive and fertile years (generally considered to be between 1890 and 1960), it was a destination for the wealthy and famous from around the world, including Prince Leopold, Duke of Albany and Princess Louise, Duchess of Argyll, American presidents Nixon and Carter, British royalty, and numerous Hollywood stars.

== Economy ==
The Matapedia is a world-renowned Atlantic salmon fishing river and was given the title "The Fishing Capital of the World" due to the abundance of large, healthy, bright salmon. The Atlantic salmon is mainly a fly fishing only, "catch and release" species; and salmon fishing in this area is highly regulated by the Province of Quebec, with special daily permits and licenses required. It is recommended to inquire in the village of Matapedia for information on permits and guides. Public waters are available to anglers in the upper portions of the river. Limited-access salmon fishing, generally with outfitters or guides to the most productive salmon pools is made available to the public via a special annual lottery. There are still many private fishing camps on the banks of the lower river, such as Cold Springs, Glen Emma, Runnymeade Lodge, Restigouche Salmon Club and the Tobique, most of them owned by businessmen and large corporations.

== Municipalities on watercourse ==
Matapédia River crosses the territory of these Quebec municipalities:

- Amqui (taking his source in Matapédia Lake)
- Lac-au-Saumon (where the river crosses lac au Saumon (Matapédia))
- Causapscal
- Sainte-Florence
- Routhierville
- Saint-Alexis-de-Matapédia
- Matapédia (where the river empties in Restigouche River)

== List of salmon pools ==
The river exceeded its target for salmon management in 2018, and in July 2018 the Ministry of Forests, Wildlife and Parks announced that in August anglers could keep their catch of one large salmon 63 centimetres (25 in) or longer in the Gros Mécatina, Napetipi, Saint-Paul, Vieux Fort and Matapedia rivers.

From downstream to upstream, from the Restigouche River to Lac au Saumon (Matapédia).

Area 1:

- Lower Lawlor: also called simply Lawlor. His name has existed since at least 1978 and is in honour of Jack Lawlor and his family who lived before the pit.
- Du Pont
- Delaney: this name which is existing at least since 1982, is in honour of the Delaney family which includes Jim Delaney, who was a guard at Restigouche Salmon Fishing Club.
- The Islands: this name is existing since at least 1982 because the salmon pit is located in the middle of three islands.
- Duncan Hole: This name is used since at least 1978. The English term Hole means that the pit has a significant depth.
- Haley's: Haley also called in French. This name has been used since at least 1982 and is in honor of the Haley family.
- Lawlor's Rock: Rock literally Lawlor. His name is from the time of Bard fishing camp in the years 1940 and is in honor of the family of Jack Lawlor who lived on the Matapedia River.
- Cheuter's
- Pot Hole: this name existed since at least 1982. The English term jar means that the pit is small.
- Ryan's: Ryan is a French patronym. This name has been used since at least 1978 and is due to the fact that the pit is located just upstream of the Ryan Creek.
- Home
- Railroad: literally rail, this existing name exist since at least 1978 due to the presence of a railway bridge over the river at this point.
- Lower Alexander
- Indian Brook
- Gilmour Creek
- Ted's Rock
- Prentise
- Lyons
- Mann's
- Gulch
- Habersham
- McKiel's
- Clark's Brook
- Home Pool
- Bowl
- Three Islands: also known in French "Les Trois Iles". This name existed since at least 1978 and is due to the fact that the pit is in the middle of three islands.
- Jim's Rock
- Millstream
- Station
- Foot of Island
- Lower Fraser
- Home Fraser Pool
- Upper Fraser
- Mirror
- Glover's Rock
- Gates of Hell
- Rock Angus
- Assemetquagan
- Railroad

Area 2:

- Falls
- Richard
- The Rocky
- Low Murdock
- Murdock
- Whælock
- Johreon
- Stephenson
- Glen Emma
- Home
- Kennedy
- Pass Island
- Milnikek
- De l'Orme
- Source
- Shed Lower
- Bogan
- The Shed
- Hugis
- Low McNeil's
- McNeil's
- Edgar

Area 3:

- Brown's
- The Dog Island
- Covered Bridge
- At Omer
- Alice
- Fraser
- Caswell
- Rock French
- Cullen
- Rock Lepage
- Nameless
- Low Water
- At Salmon
- Monnick
- Beautiful shoreline
- Pont-Beaurivage
- Florence
- Low Adams
- Upper Adams
- The page
- Pont du Chemin de Fer
- Stream Lajoie
- Grosse Roche
- Low Matalik
- Matalik
- Heppel
- Wyer's
- Blais
- Pont-Laforce
- Douglas
- Bend the Devil
- Wainwright
- Peter's
- On-the-Pierre-à-Luc
- Elbow Alac
- Station
- Home
- Forks

Area 4:

- Princess Louise
- Sir Allan
- Alice
- Simgerly
- Three Islands
- Barrage
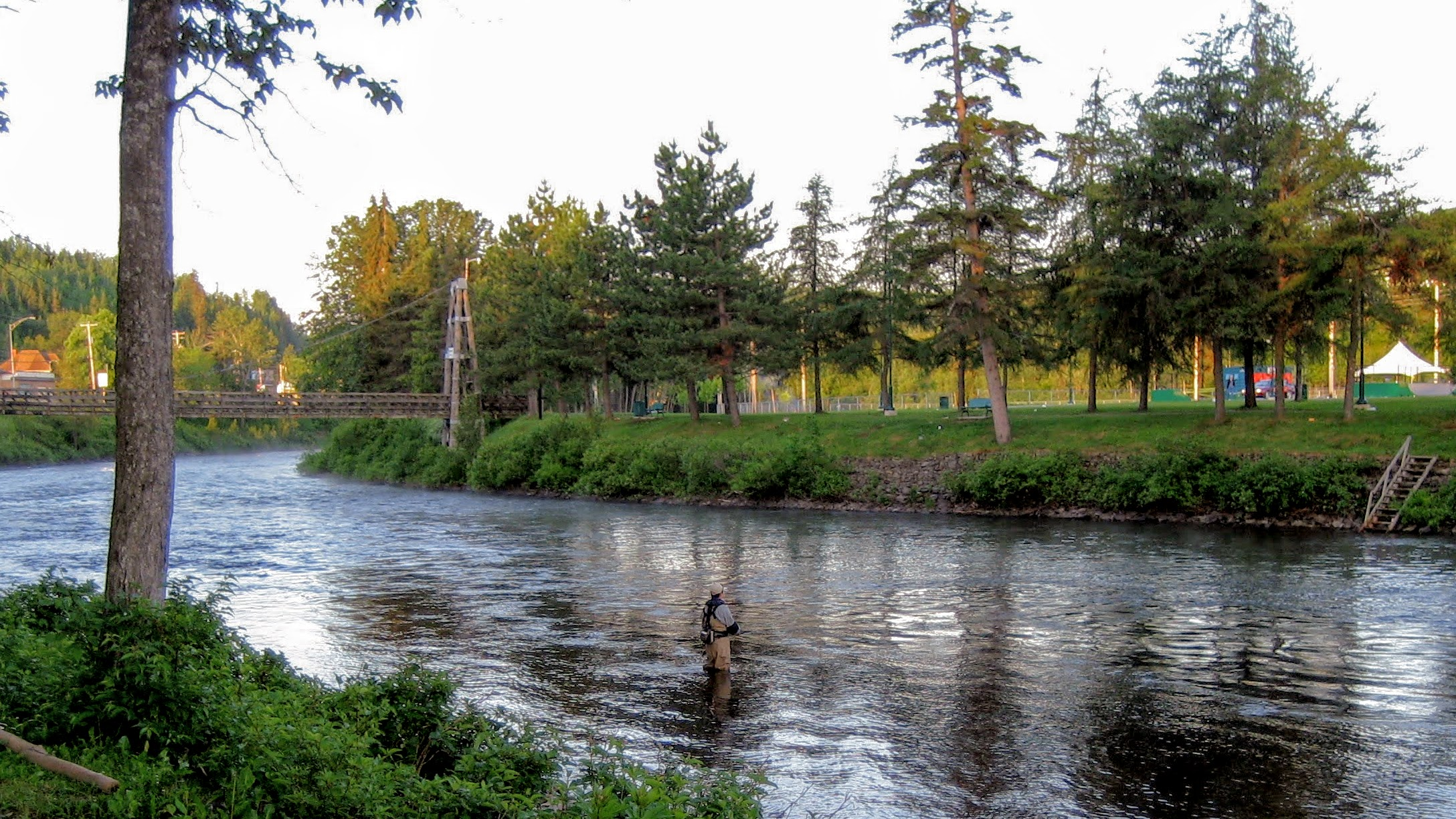
Salmon Fisherman

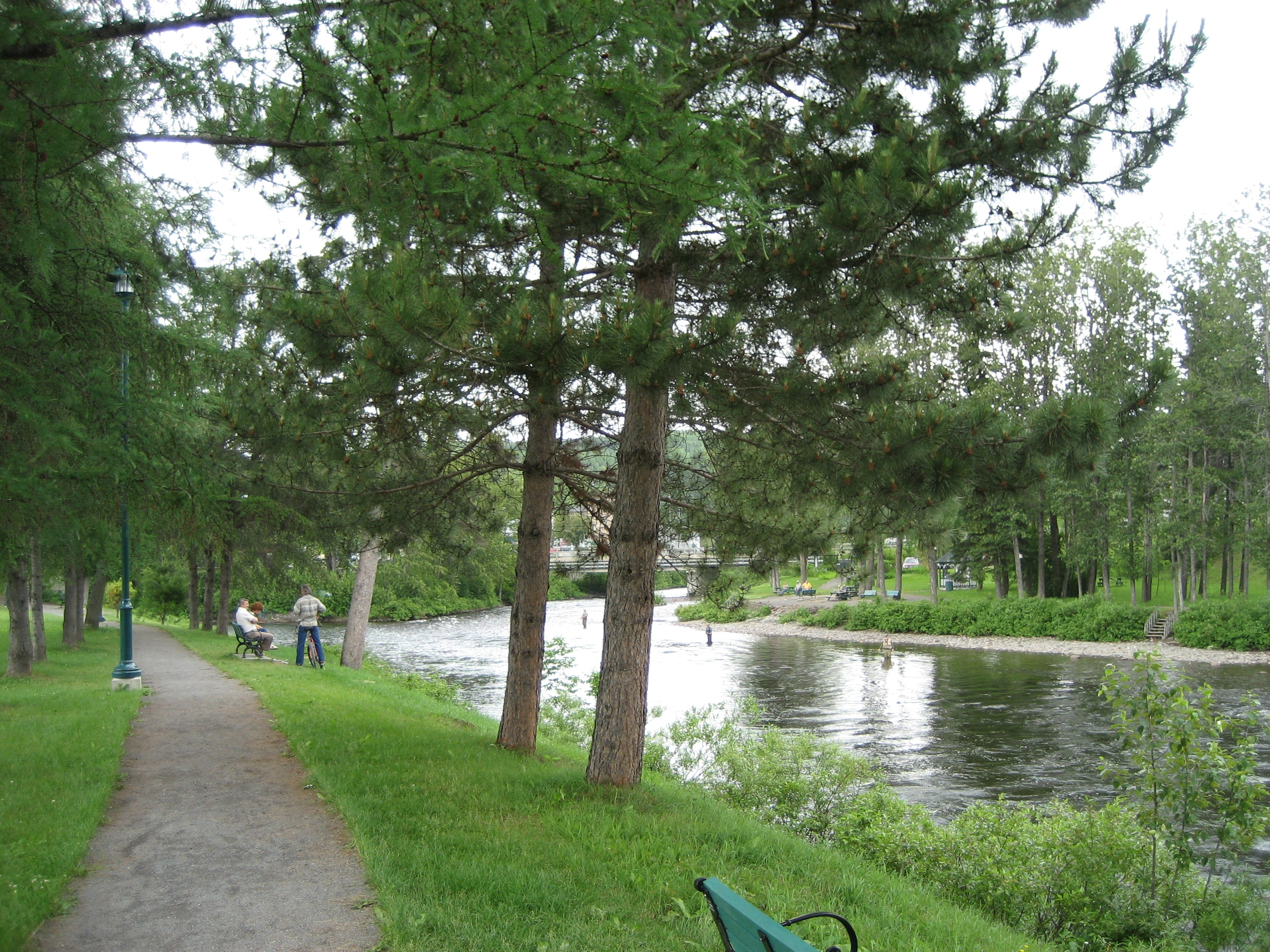
Salmon Fishermen on the pit "The Forks" (Les Fourches)

== In popular culture ==
The river provided the name and inspiration for the title track of the album Matapédia by Quebec singer-songwriters Kate and Anna McGarrigle.

== See also ==
- Sableuse River, a watercourse
- List of rivers of Quebec
