= Méharicourt =

- Commune
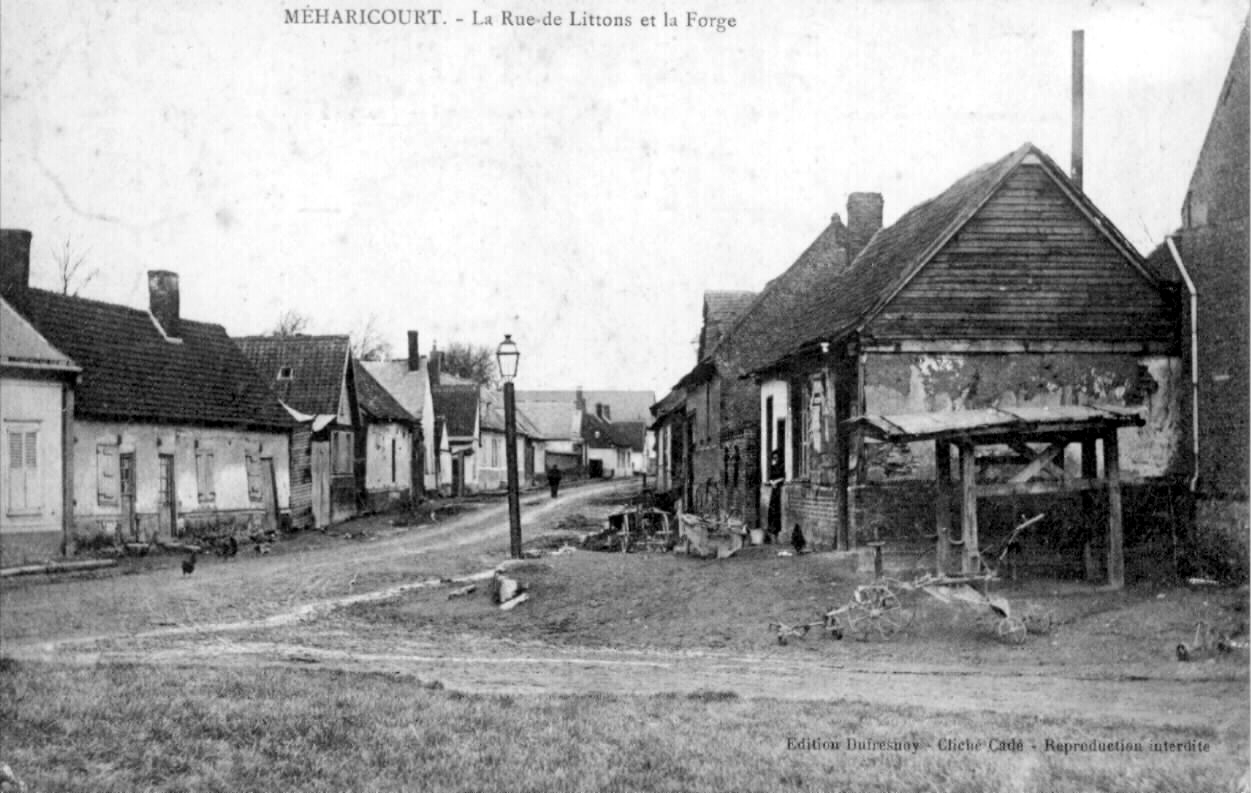
- A 1905 view of Méharicourt
- Location of Méharicourt
- Location within France Location within Hauts-de-France
- Coordinates: 49°47′58″N 2°43′58″E
- Country: France
- Region: Hauts-de-France
- Department: Somme
- Arrondissement: Péronne
- Canton: Moreuil
- Intercommunality: CC Terre de Picardie

Government
  - Mayor (2020–2026): Claire Fournet
- Area^{1}: 7.01 km^{2} (2.71 sq mi)
- Elevation: 82 m (269 ft)
- Highest elevation: 94 m (308 ft)
- Lowest elevation: 78 m (256 ft)
- Population (2023): 546
  - Density: 77.9/km^{2} (202/sq mi)
- Time zone: UTC+01:00 (CET)
  - Summer (DST): UTC+02:00 (CEST)
- INSEE/Postal code: 80524 /80170
- ^{1} French Land Register data, which excludes lakes, ponds, glaciers > 1 km^{2} (0.386 sq mi or 247 acres) and river estuaries.

Méharicourt (French pronunciation: [meaʁikuʁ]) is a commune in the Somme department in Hauts-de-France in northern France.

== Geography ==
The commune is situated on the D39 and D131 crossroads, 40 kilometres (25 mi) southeast of Amiens, in a small depression of a plateau, the start of the valley of the river Luce.

== History ==
The village name has evolved over the centuries, from "Mahéricourt" in 1135, through "Maharicourt", "Méhatincourt" and "Méharicours en Sangter". Some Roman remains, of coffins, have been found in the area. There was possibly a small camp there. As with much of the region, it suffered during the Hundred Years War and again during the Wars of Religion.

Méharicourt was a place of pilgrimage to the martyrs Saint Candide and Saint Flamidien. Their relics were carried from Rome in 1688 and presented to St. Martin's church by the Count of Tincourt.

By 1899, Méharicourt had three steam-powered factories employing 500 people, making linen products, socks, stockings and hunting jackets.

The linen industry provided prosperity throughout the 18th and 19th centuries and the village became chef-lieu, a title it lost to Rosières in later years. During the 19th century, the village was invaded by Cossacks in 1814–1815. In 1840, the streets were repaired and the church restored, by a grant of 3000 francs and the labour of the local unemployed. The bell-tower, built in 1607, was reconstructed in 1842 A school for girls and a refuge were built in 1863. The Second World War saw a German airfield built next to the village, with building materials taken from the town hall of Rosières.

== Population ==
Historical population
Year	Pop.	±% p.a.
1968	429	—
1975	485	+1.77%
1982	512	+0.78%
1990	480	−0.80%
1999	538	+1.28%
2007	596	+1.29%
2012	568	−0.96%
2017	589	+0.73%
2023	546	−1.26%
Source: INSEE

== See also ==
- Communes of the Somme department
