= Rivière-du-Loup–Témiscouata–Les Basques =

Provincial electoral district in Quebec, Canada

Coordinates: 47.64°N 68.86°W

Quebec electoral district

Provincial electoral district
- Legislature: National Assembly of Quebec
MNA
Ariane Boyer
Parti Québécois
- District created: 2011
- First contested: 2012
- Last contested: 2026

Demographics
- Population (2011): 64,120
- Electors (2012): 50,769
- Area (km²): 7,395.0
- Pop. density (per km²): 8.7
- Census division(s): Les Basques (all), Rivière-du-Loup (all), Témiscouata (all)
- Census subdivision(s): Auclair, Biencourt, Cacouna, Dégelis, Lac-des-Aigles, Lejeune, L'Isle-Verte, Notre-Dame-des-Neiges, Notre-Dame-des-Sept-Douleurs, Notre-Dame-du-Portage, Packington, Pohénégamook, Rivière-Bleue, Rivière-du-Loup, Saint-Antonin, Saint-Arsène, Saint-Athanase, Saint-Clément, Saint-Cyprien, Saint-Éloi, Saint-Elzéar-de-Témiscouata, Saint-Épiphane, Saint-Eusèbe, Sainte-Françoise, Saint-François-Xavier-de-Viger, Saint-Honoré-de-Témiscouata, Saint-Hubert-de-Rivière-du-Loup, Saint-Jean-de-Dieu, Saint-Jean-de-la-Lande, Saint-Juste-du-Lac, Saint-Louis-du-Ha! Ha!, Saint-Marc-du-Lac-Long, Saint-Mathieu-de-Rioux, Saint-Médard, Saint-Michel-du-Squatec, Saint-Modeste, Saint-Paul-de-la-Croix, Saint-Pierre-de-Lamy, Sainte-Rita, Saint-Simon-de-Rimouski, Témiscouata-sur-le-Lac, Trois-Pistoles; Cacouna (Indian reserve), Kataskomiq; Lac-Boisbouscache

Rivière-du-Loup–Témiscouata–Les Basques (formerly Rivière-du-Loup–Témiscouata) is a provincial electoral district in Quebec, Canada, that elects members to the National Assembly of Quebec. It is located in the Bas-Saint-Laurent region. It notably includes the municipalities of Rivière-du-Loup, Témiscouata-sur-le-Lac, Saint-Antonin, Trois-Pistoles, Dégelis, Pohénégamook, Cacouna, Saint-Jean-de-Dieu, Saint-Hubert-de-Rivière-du-Loup, and L'Isle-Verte.

It was created for the 2012 election from all of the former Rivière-du-Loup electoral district and part of the former Kamouraska-Témiscouata electoral districts; it also took Lac-des-Aigles and Biencourt from the Rimouski electoral district. Effectively, the entire territory of the Témiscouata Regional County Municipality was added to the former Rivière-du-Loup electoral district.

== Members of National Assembly ==
Legislature	Years	Member	Party
Riding created from Rivière-du-Loup, Kamouraska-Témiscouata and Rimouski
40th	2012–2014	Jean D'Amour	Liberal
41st	2014–2018	Jean D'Amour	Liberal
42nd	2018–2020	Denis Tardif	Coalition Avenir Québec
42nd	2020–2021	Denis Tardif	Independent
42nd	2021–2022	Denis Tardif	Coalition Avenir Québec
43rd	2022–2026	Amélie Dionne	Coalition Avenir Québec
Rivière-du-Loup–Témiscouata–Les Basques
44th	2026–Present	Ariane Boyer	Parti Québécois

== Election results ==
2026 Quebec general election
** Preliminary results — Not yet official **
Party	Candidate	Votes	%	±%
Parti Québécois	Ariane Boyer	12,745	35.29	
Conservative	Louise Moreault	8,306	23.00	
Coalition Avenir Québec	Amélie Dionne	7,110	19.69	
Liberal	Karine Malenfant	5,189	14.37	
Québec solidaire	Pierre-Erik Isabelle	2,434	6.74	
Climat Québec	Carole Sierpien	330	0.91	
Total valid votes				
Total rejected ballots				
Turnout			70.23	
Electors on the lists			–	–
Parti Québécois gain from Coalition Avenir Québec		Swing		+20.43
Source: Élections Québec

2022 Quebec general election: Rivière-du-Loup-Témiscouata
Party	Candidate	Votes	%	±%
Coalition Avenir Québec	Amélie Dionne	18,183	52.06	+12.88
Parti Québécois	Félix Rioux	6,141	17.58	+2.33
Québec solidaire	Myriam Lapointe-Gagnon	5,102	14.61	+3.58
Conservative	Louise Moreault	3,937	11.27	+10.18
Liberal	Louis Bellemare	1,388	3.97	–29.49
Climat Québec	Carole Sierpien	174	0.50	New
Total valid votes		34,925	98.95	
Total rejected ballots		369	1.05	–0.62
Turnout		35,294	68.89	–0.52
Electors on the lists		51,230		
Coalition Avenir Québec hold		Swing		+5.28
Source: Élections Québec

2018 Quebec general election: Rivière-du-Loup-Témiscouata
Party	Candidate	Votes	%	±%
Coalition Avenir Québec	Denis Tardif	13,439	39.18	+22.62
Liberal	Jean D'Amour	11,477	33.46	-18.23
Parti Québécois	Vincent Couture	5,230	15.25	-8.70
Québec solidaire	Goulimine Sylvie Cadôret	3,783	11.03	+4.94
Conservative	Martin Perron	373	1.09	–
Total valid votes		34,302	98.33	
Total rejected ballots		583	1.67	
Turnout		34,885	69.41	-0.59
Eligible voters		50,261		
Coalition Avenir Québec gain from Liberal		Swing		+20.43
Source(s) "Rapport des résultats officiels du scrutin". Élections Québec.

2014 Quebec general election: Rivière-du-Loup–Témiscouata
Party	Candidate	Votes	%	±%
Liberal	Jean D'Amour	18,086	51.69	+10.78
Parti Québécois	Michel Lagacé	8,378	23.95	-10.42
Coalition Avenir Québec	Charles Roy	5,794	16.56	-2.00
Québec solidaire	Louis Gagnon	2,129	6.09	+3.11
Parti des sans Parti	Frank Malenfant	354	1.01	+0.65*
Option nationale	Étienne Massé	245	0.70	-0.39
Total valid votes		34,986	98.61	–
Total rejected ballots		494	1.39	–
Turnout		35,480	70.00	-4.56
Electors on the lists		50,688	–	–
* Result compared to Coalition pour la constituante

2012 Quebec general election: Rivière-du-Loup–Témiscouata
Party	Candidate	Votes	%	±%
Liberal	Jean D'Amour	15,317	40.91	-4.12
Parti Québécois	Michel Lagacé	12,870	34.37	-2.03
Coalition Avenir Québec	Gaétan Lavoie	6,949	18.56	+2.59
Québec solidaire	Stacy Larouche	1,116	2.98	+1.93
Green	Nadia Pelletier	647	1.73	+0.74
Option nationale	Jonathan St-Pierre	410	1.09	–
Coalition pour la constituante	Sylvain Potvin	135	0.36	–
Total valid votes		37,444	98.86	–
Total rejected ballots		430	1.14	–
Turnout		37,874	74.56	
Electors on the lists		50,795	–	–
^ Change is from redistributed results. CAQ change is from ADQ.
Liberal hold		Swing		-1.04

== See also ==
- List of Quebec provincial electoral districts
- Canadian provincial electoral districts
