= Quebec Route 191 =

Highway in Quebec, Canada

Route 191

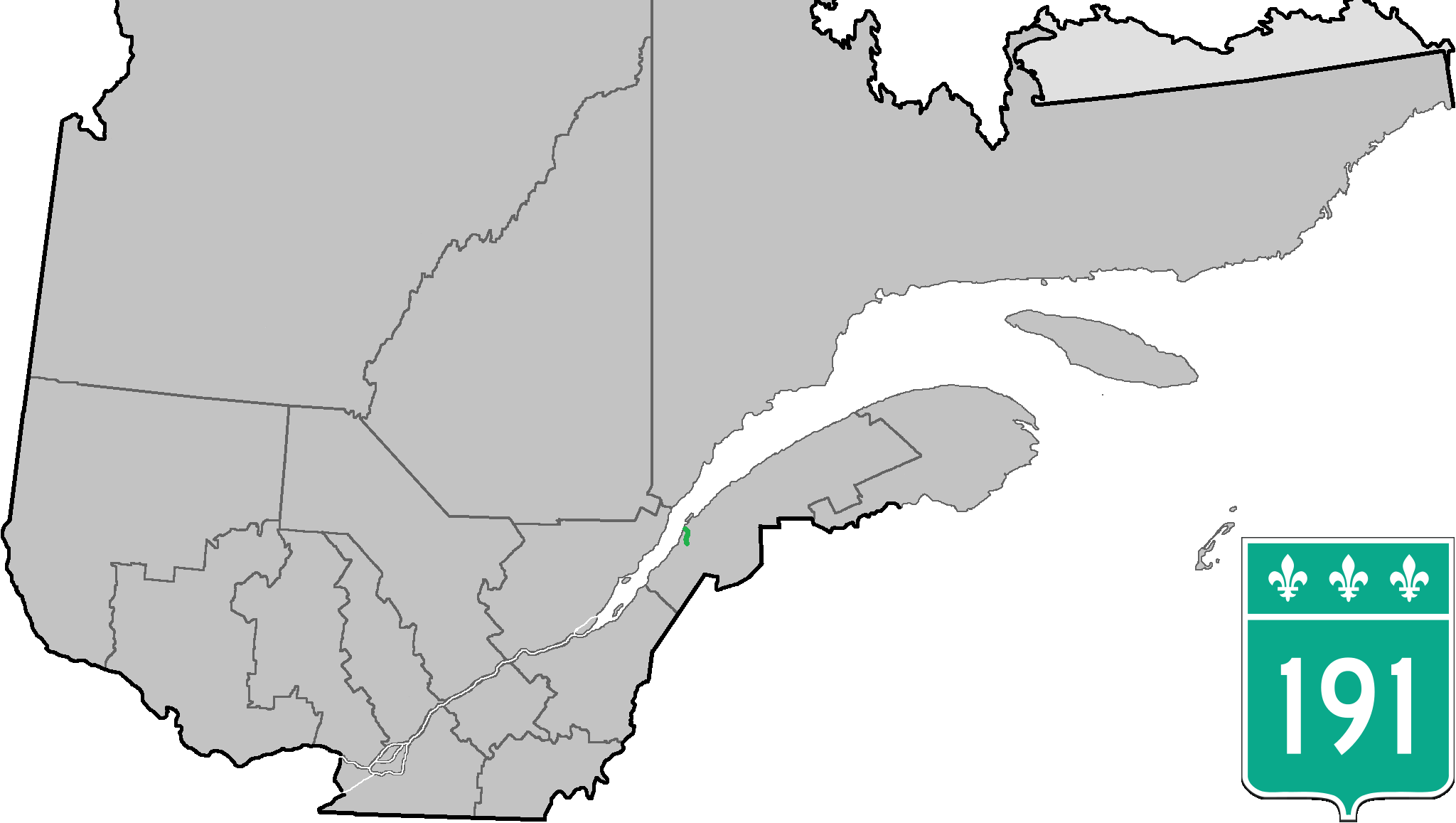

Route information
- Length: 15.3 km (9.5 mi)
- Existed: 2009–present

Major junctions
- South end: A-85 (TCH) in Rivière-du-Loup
- R-291 near Rivière-du-Loup
- North end: A-20 in Cacouna

Location
- Country: Canada
- Province: Quebec
- Major cities: Cacouna, Rivière-du-Loup

Highway system
- Quebec provincial highways; Autoroutes; List; Former
← R-175	→ R-195

Quebec Route 191 is a provincial highway in the Canadian province of Quebec. This route provides a link connecting Quebec Autoroute 20 and Quebec Autoroute 85 from Rivière-du-Loup and Cacouna and a direct link for areas east of Rivière-du-Loup towards the southern part of the Bas-Saint-Laurent region, New Brunswick and Maine.

== Towns along Route 191 ==
- Rivière-du-Loup
- Cacouna

== Major intersections ==
The entire route is in Rivière-du-Loup RCM.

Location	km	mi	Destinations	Notes
Rivière-du-Loup	0.0	0.0	A-85 (TCH) to A-20 west – Nouveau-Brunswick, Québec	R-191 southern terminus; A-85 exit 93
Rivière-du-Loup	1.0	0.62	Rue Témiscouata – Rivière-du-Loup (Centre-Ville)	
Rivière-du-Loup	7.0	4.3	R-291 north – Rivière-du-Loup (Centre-Ville)	South end of R-291 concurrency
Cacouna	11.8	7.3	R-291 south – Saint-Arsène	North end of R-291 concurrency
Cacouna	13.3	8.3	A-20 – Rivière-du-Loup, Rimouski	R-191 northern terminus; A-20 exit 514
Cacouna	15.3	9.5	R-132 – Rivière-du-Loup, Rimouski	
1.000 mi = 1.609 km; 1.000 km = 0.621 mi: Closed/former; Concurrency terminus
