= Léon Dion =

Canadian political scientist (1922–1997)

Léon Dion OC OQ
- Born: 9 October 1922; Saint-Arsène, Quebec, Canada
- Died: 20 August 1997 (aged 74); Sillery, Quebec, Canada
- Spouse: Denyse Kormann
- Children: Stéphane Dion
- Awards: Order of Canada; National Order of Quebec

Léon Dion OC OQ (9 October 1922 – 20 August 1997) was a Canadian political scientist.

Dion was born in Saint-Arsène, Rivière-du-Loup Regional County Municipality. He co-founded the department of political science at Université Laval with Gérard Bergeron and Maurice Tremblay in 1954.

He is the father of former federal foreign affairs minister and former Liberal leader Stéphane Dion.

== Honours ==
- 1965 - Prize of the Académie française, Les groupes et le pouvoir politique aux États-Unis (Groups and power in the United States)
- 1970 - Member of the Royal Society of Canada
- 1971 - Doctorat honoris causa of laws from Queen's University
- 1972 - Member of the Académie des sciences morales et politiques
- 1977 - Prix Léon-Gérin
- 1983 - Prix Arthur-Buies, given during the Salon du livre à Rimouski
- 1985 - Prix Esdras-Minville
- 1986 - Médaille Gloire de l'Escolle
- 1990 - Prix Marcel-Vincent
- 1990 - Officer of the National Order of Quebec
- 1993 - Governor General's Award finalist
- 1996 - Officer of the Order of Canada
