= Cacouna =

- Municipality
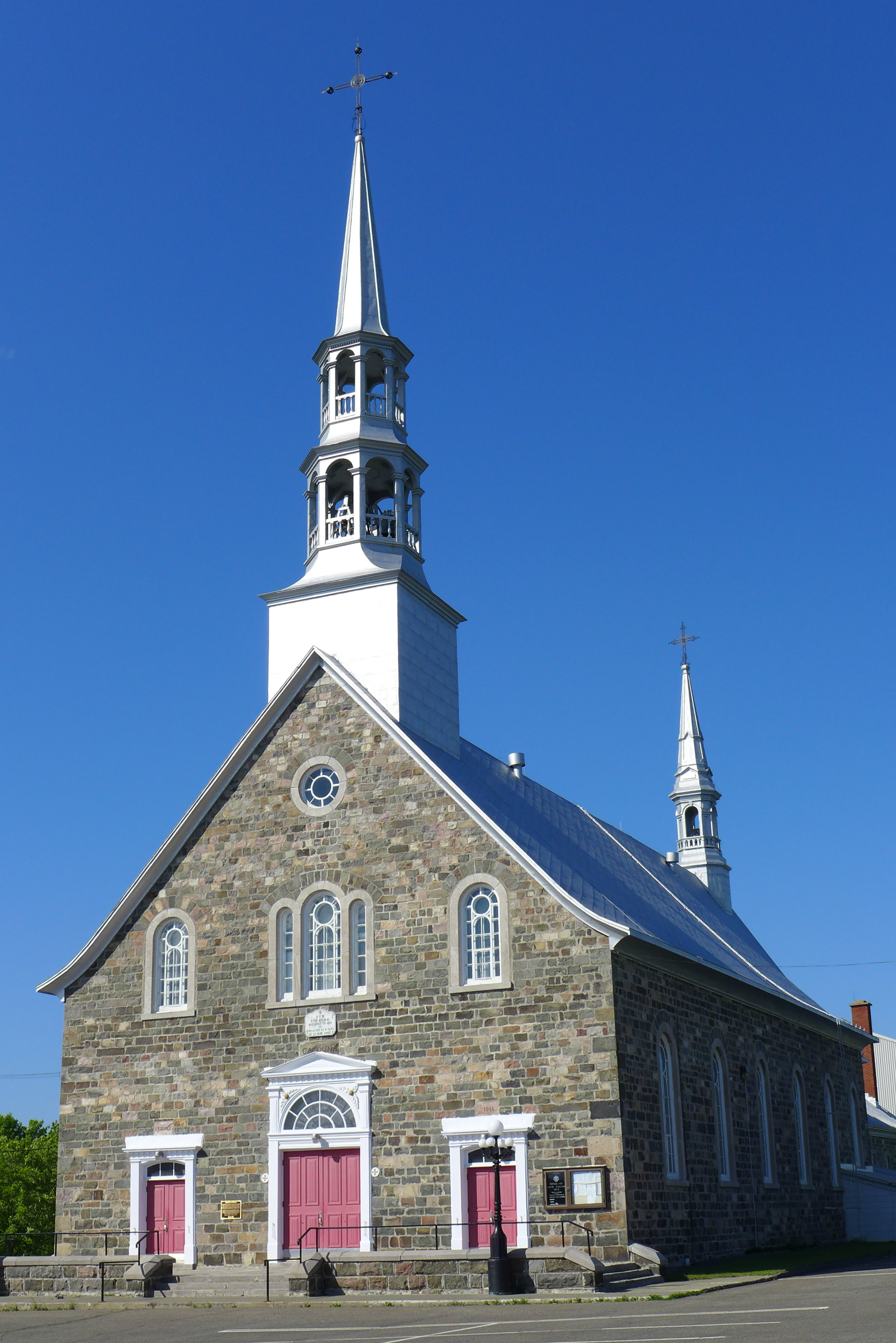
- Church of Cacouna

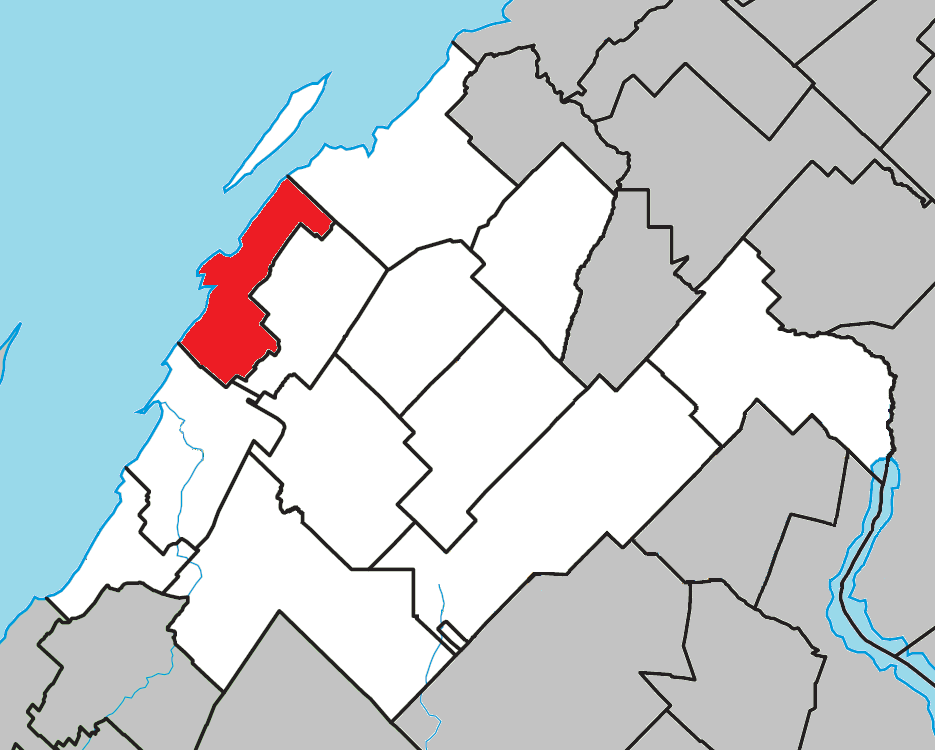
- Location within Rivière-du-Loup RCM

- Location in eastern Quebec
- Coordinates: 47°55′N 69°30′W
- Country: Canada
- Province: Quebec
- Region: Bas-Saint-Laurent
- RCM: Rivière-du-Loup
- Constituted: March 22, 2006

Government
  - Mayor: Suzanne Rhéaume
  - Federal riding: Côte-du-Sud—Rivière-du-Loup—Kataskomiq—Témiscouata
  - Prov. riding: Rivière-du-Loup–Témiscouata–Les Basques

Area
  - Total: 173.70 km^{2} (67.07 sq mi)
  - Land: 62.75 km^{2} (24.23 sq mi)

Population (2021)
  - Total: 1,848
  - Density: 29.4/km^{2} (76/sq mi)
  - Pop 2016–2021: ▲2.5%
  - Dwellings: 954
- Time zone: UTC−5 (EST)
  - Summer (DST): UTC−4 (EDT)
- Postal code(s): G0L 1G0
- Area codes: 418 and 581
- Highways A-20: R-132; R-191; R-291
- Website: www.cacouna.ca

Cacouna (French pronunciation: [kakuna]) is a municipality in the Rivière-du-Loup Regional County Municipality within the Bas-Saint-Laurent region of Quebec, Canada. It is located on the south shore of the Saint Lawrence River along Route 132.

The municipality of Cacouna was created in March 2006 through the amalgamation of the municipality of Saint-Georges-de-Cacouna and the parish of Saint-Georges-de-Cacouna.

With a population of 1,900, Cacouna is noted for the quality and unique architectural heritage of its buildings and for the richness and diversity of its agricultural life. The deep water port of Gros-Cacouna is a vital asset in the region's future development. Cacouna is a member of the association The Most Beautiful Villages in Quebec.

'Cacouna' is also the name of an Indian reserve of the Quebec Wolastoqiyik Nation, more specifically Wolastoqiyik Wahsipekuk (Viger) First Nation, located in the administrative region of Bas-Saint-Laurent.

Many see in the name 'Cacouna' Cree words, kakwa or kakoua, meaning porcupine or dwelling or dwelling place of porcupine. The actual location of Cacouna, however, puts this interpretation in doubt as the Cree have never visited this region. The Innu could have given the area its name during one of their crossings of the Saint Lawrence River in the past, as the word kaku also means porcupine in their language. More likely, though, the name could have come from the Wolastoqey word kakona. The name 'Saint George' was retained by Bishop Plessis in 1809 at the request of Malcolm Fraser, lord of Murray Bay (La Malbaie) from 1733 to 1815. Saint George, an officer martyred in Palestine in 303 AD, is a patron of the English people and his battle against the dragon has been represented multiple times in art.

== History ==
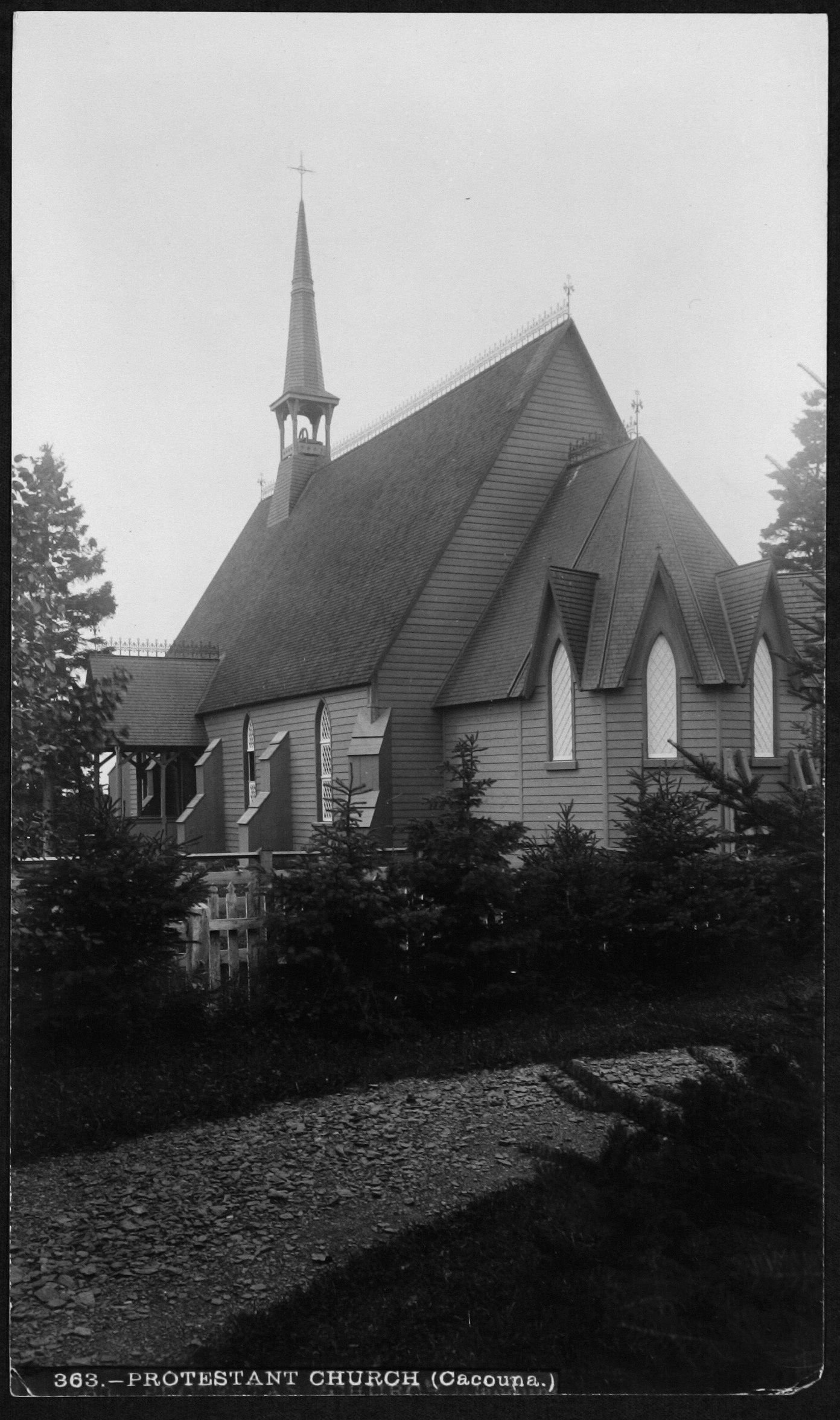
Cacouna Church ca. 1900

The land had been occupied since 1721, by a number of families. After the deportation of Acadians from Quebec in 1758, several Acadians established residence on the land, living as squatters.

At the end of the 19th and beginning of the 20th centuries, with the construction of the railway to Rivière-du-Loup and the Maritime provinces, several wealthy Anglophone families from Montreal and Toronto built luxury villas in Cacouna, some of which still stand today. In the summer, the village was as a site of beachgoing, celebration and relaxation for these vacationers, providing employment to villagers working in the service industry. The vacationers began to slowly leave Cacouna during the Great Depression. Shipowner and banker Sir Montagu Allan had Château Montrose, his summer home, built at Cacouna in 1900. In 1941 Château Montrose was sold to the Order of Friars Minor Capuchin.

Cacouna is also the birthplace of Mario Dumont, former leader of the Action démocratique du Québec.

== Geography ==
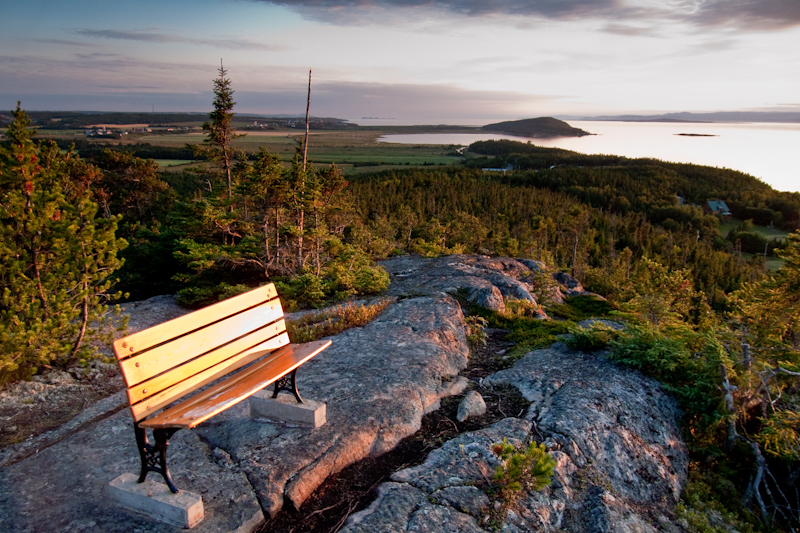
View of the Saint Lawrence river estuary

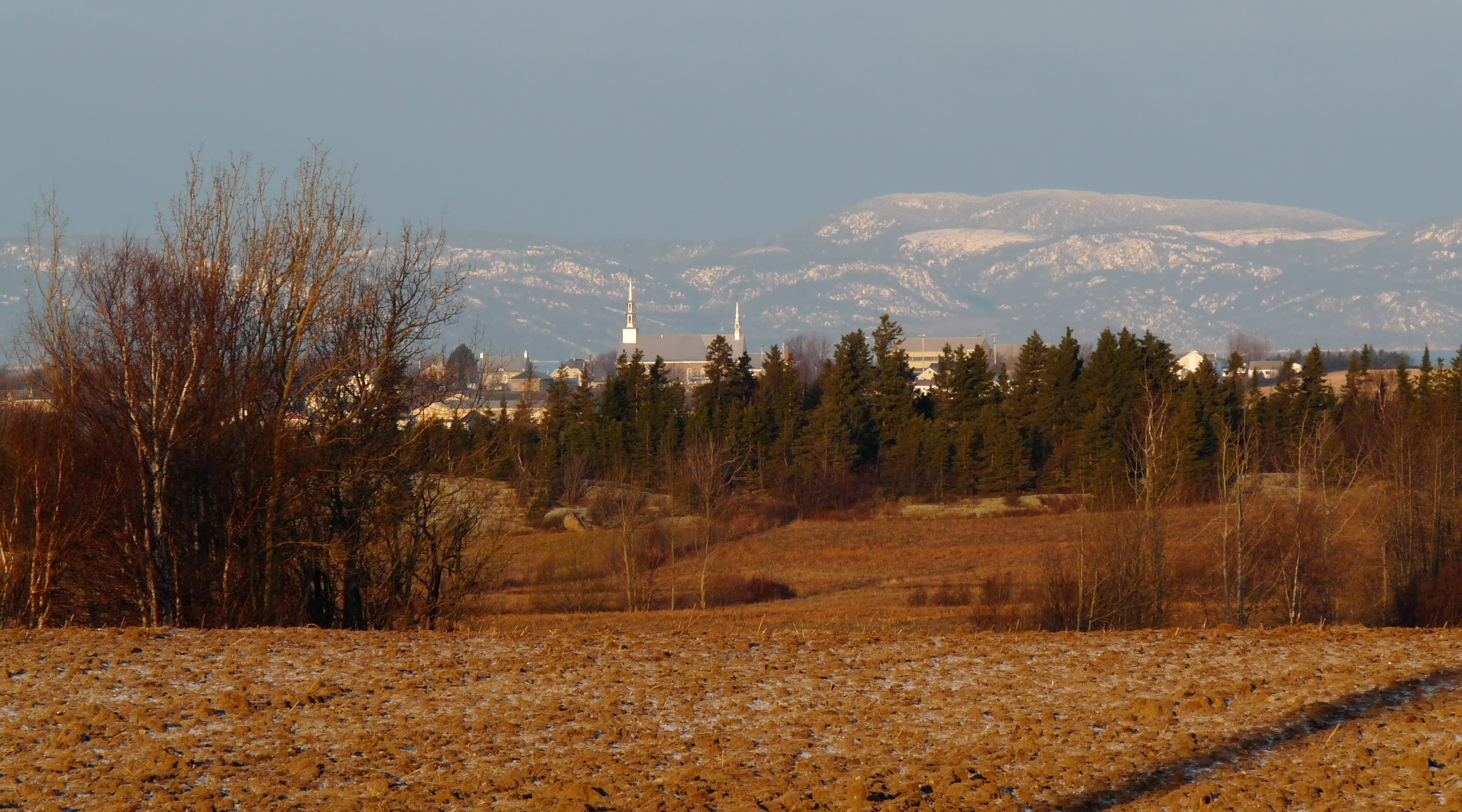
Cacouna and the Charlevois mountains in the background seen from Saint-Arsene

A large part of the banks of the Saint Lawrence river in the eastern half of the village is bordered by public land, managed by the Canadian Wildlife Service. The property is divided into two parts:

- The Gros-Cacouna marsh is an ornithological site that covers nearly 200 hectares (490 acres) including a portion of the peninsula near the Gros-Cacouna harbour. Almost 4 km (2.5 mi) of trails allow visitors to discover many species of birds in their natural habitat, most notably waterfowl, such as the black guillemot, double-crested cormorant, greater snow goose, common eider, American black duck and Barrow's goldeneye and shorebirds, such as the black-bellied plover, semipalmated plover, short-billed dowitcher, yellow rail along with Le Conte's sparrow and American white pelican among the many other species.
- The Baie de l'Isle-Verte National Wildlife Area covers the majority of the land between the path at Rivière-des-Vases and the Saint Lawrence river estuary. The Regional County Municipality of Rivière-du-Loup also manages the public land bordering the estuary. There are trails and lookouts on hills overlooking the Saint Lawrence River that allow for a panoramic view of the region.

== Demographics ==
In the 2021 Census of Population conducted by Statistics Canada, Cacouna had a population of 1,848 living in 855 of its 954 total private dwellings, a change of 2.5% from its 2016 population of 1,803. With a land area of 62.75 km^{2} (24.23 sq mi), it had a population density of 29.5/km^{2} (76.3/sq mi) in 2021.

== Economy ==
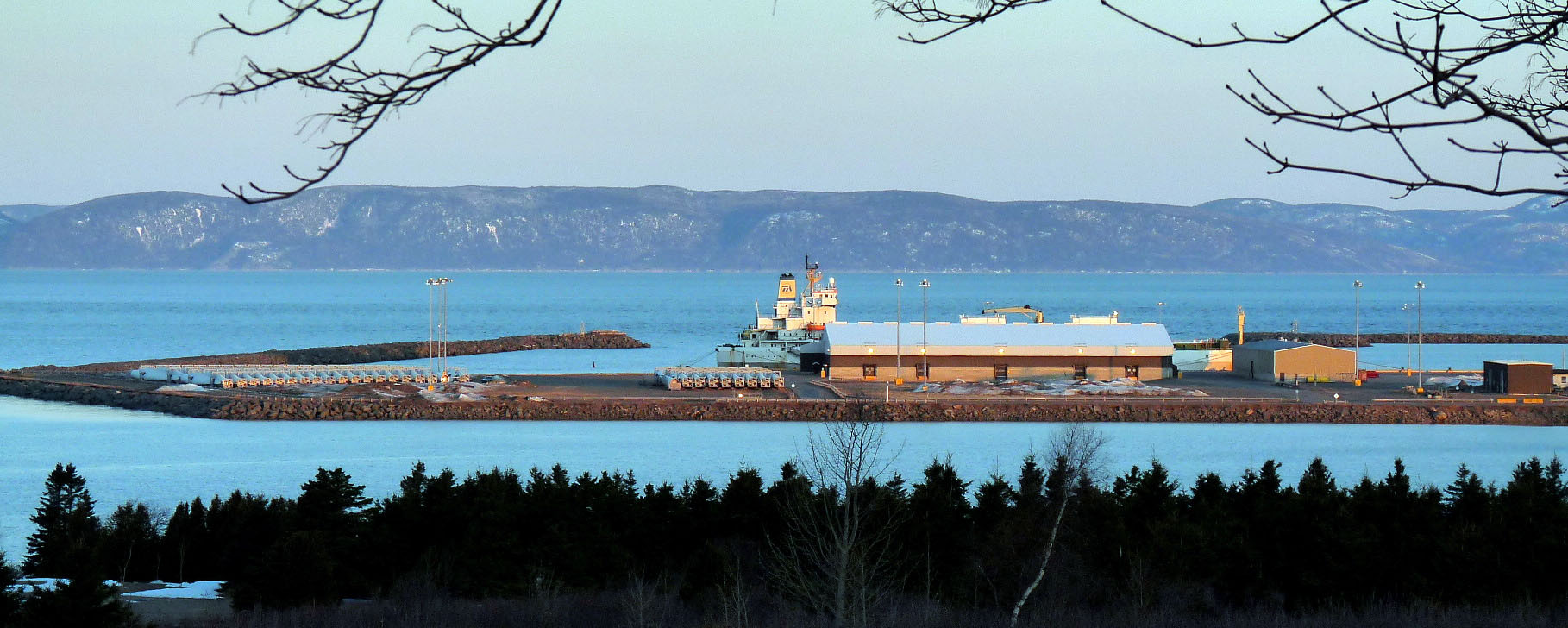
Port of Gros-Cacouna

The port of Gros Cacouna is a deep-water seaport with a water depth of 10.2 metres (33 ft). It was inaugurated in 1981, after a wait of over 25 years due to regional proceedings.

The quantity of raw material transhipped in the port has decreased significantly over the last ten years. In 1995, the port was mostly used to export 290,000 tonnes of forest and pulp and paper products. Yet, only 20,000 tons of these products were loaded in 2005. They were partially replaced by cement (100,000 tonnes in 2005) exported to the Great Lakes region in the United States.

The port is also used to unload cement imported from Brazil (50,000 tons in 2005), road salt from the Magdalen Islands and various metal products.

Since 2005, several wind turbine parts have also been transhipped in the port.

=== Cacouna Energy ===
A controversial project of building a methane terminal in the port of Gros Cacouna was announced on September 1, 2004. The project was proposed by Cacouna Energy, a consortium of TransCanada Pipelines and Petro-Canada. According to the proposed scenario, liquefied natural gas would be imported from Russia to Gros-Cacouna, where it would be regasified and then distributed on the North-American market via a new gas pipeline.

A joint review panel composed of the Bureau d'audiences publiques sur l'environnement and the Canadian Environmental Assessment Agency submitted its report on November 1, 2006. The panel concluded that the project would be unlikely to have significant environmental impacts as long as the panel's recommendations were followed and that mitigation measures were implanted.

In 2008, the proponent announced that it would delay its methane terminal project indefinitely until the supply conditions of liquefied natural gas improved in the worldwide market.

=== Energy East proposal ===
On November 10, 2014, it was revealed by The Globe and Mail that the terminus of the proposed petroleum pipeline called 'Energy East' would be located in Cacouna. TransCanada's target market for the goods is TotalEnergies, a French petroleum refiner which is part-owned by the Desmarais family, who have interests in the oil sands of Alberta. The oil would transit from the north shore of the St. Lawrence River at the Quebec Bridge, to reach the south shore at Levis, Quebec. The economics of trans-oceanic shipment is the chief reason for this new port installation.

== See also ==
- Cacouna Indian Reserve No. 22
