= Quebec Autoroute 85 =

Highway in Quebec

Autoroute 85
- Route Transcanadienne
- Autoroute Claude-Béchard
- A-85 highlighted in red

Route information
- Maintained by Transports Québec
- Length: 100 km (62 mi)
- Existed: 2002–present

Major junctions
- South end: Route 2 (TCH) near Moulin-Morneault, NB
- R-232 in Témiscouata-sur-le-Lac; Rue Fraserville, Rivière-du-Loup
- North end: A-20 (TCH) in Notre-Dame-du-Portage

Location
- Country: Canada
- Province: Quebec
- Major cities: Rivière-du-Loup, Témiscouata-sur-le-Lac, Saint-Antonin, Dégelis, Saint-Louis-du-Ha! Ha!

Highway system
- Trans-Canada Highway; Quebec provincial highways; Autoroutes; List; Former
| ← A-73 | → R-101 |

Autoroute 85 is a Quebec Autoroute and the route of the Trans-Canada Highway in the province's Bas-Saint-Laurent region, also known as Autoroute Claude-Béchard. Running for approximately 100 kilometres (62 mi) between Rivière-du-Loup (at a junction with Autoroute 20) and a junction with New Brunswick Route 2 at the Quebec–New Brunswick border, A-85 is the only controlled access highway link between the Maritime Provinces and the rest of the country.

Previously signed as Route 185, the highway was designed as A-85 in 2005 following extensive upgrading. Prior to the upgrade, Route 185 had been called one of the deadliest highways in Canada. The government of Quebec completed the final section of the upgrade in October 2026.

== Route description ==
A-85 begins at the Quebec-New Brunswick border as the continuation of New Brunswick Route 2 and the Trans-Canada Highway. In 2010, the Quebec government announced that A-85 would be named for Claude Béchard, a longtime Member of the National Assembly from Bas-Saint-Laurent.

From the New Brunswick border, A-85 briefly parallels the main runway of the Edmundston Airport, which straddles the interprovincial border. The freeway travels in a northwesterly direction, following the course of the Madawaska River. The autoroute passes Dégelis to the west with exits at km 12, km 14, and km 15. Briefly skirting the south shore of Lake Témiscouata, A-85 passes through Témiscouata-sur-le-Lac, with exits at km 29, km 37, and km 40, providing access to Lac-Témiscouata National Park. Past Saint-Louis-du-Ha! Ha! (km 50).

A-85 nears Saint-Honoré-de-Témiscouata, 3 kilometres south of its junction with Route 291 (itself at km 60), then proceeds through the Appalachian Hills, by either following its predecessor's alignment or following a new routing, leaving the former Route 185 as a local road serving residents and businesses in the area. Exit 93 provides access to Route 191 which bypasses Rivière-du-Loup to the south and provides the most direct route (and an effective go-around transit route for commercial heavy vehicle traffic) for motorists bound for Rimouski, Mont-Joli, and Gaspésie via eastbound A-20. After one last exit at Fraserville Road (km 96), the A-85 merges with westbound A-20 at the St. Lawrence River. Westbound A-20 assumes the Trans-Canada Highway designation, continuing on to Quebec City and Montreal, then to Toronto, London, and Windsor via A-20 and Ontario Highway 401, or to Ottawa via the A-40 and Ontario Highway 417, then to Winnipeg, Manitoba via Highway 17 and PTH-1.

== History ==
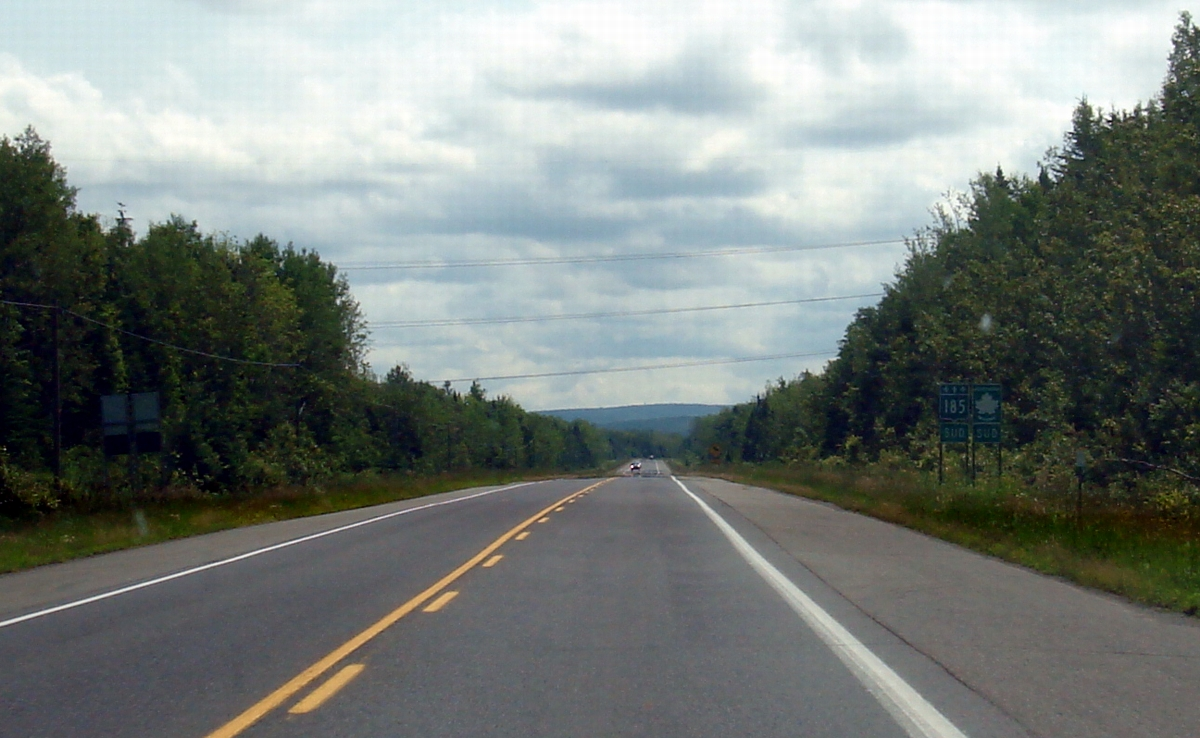
Then-Route 185 southbound, south of Rivière-du-Loup, in 2006

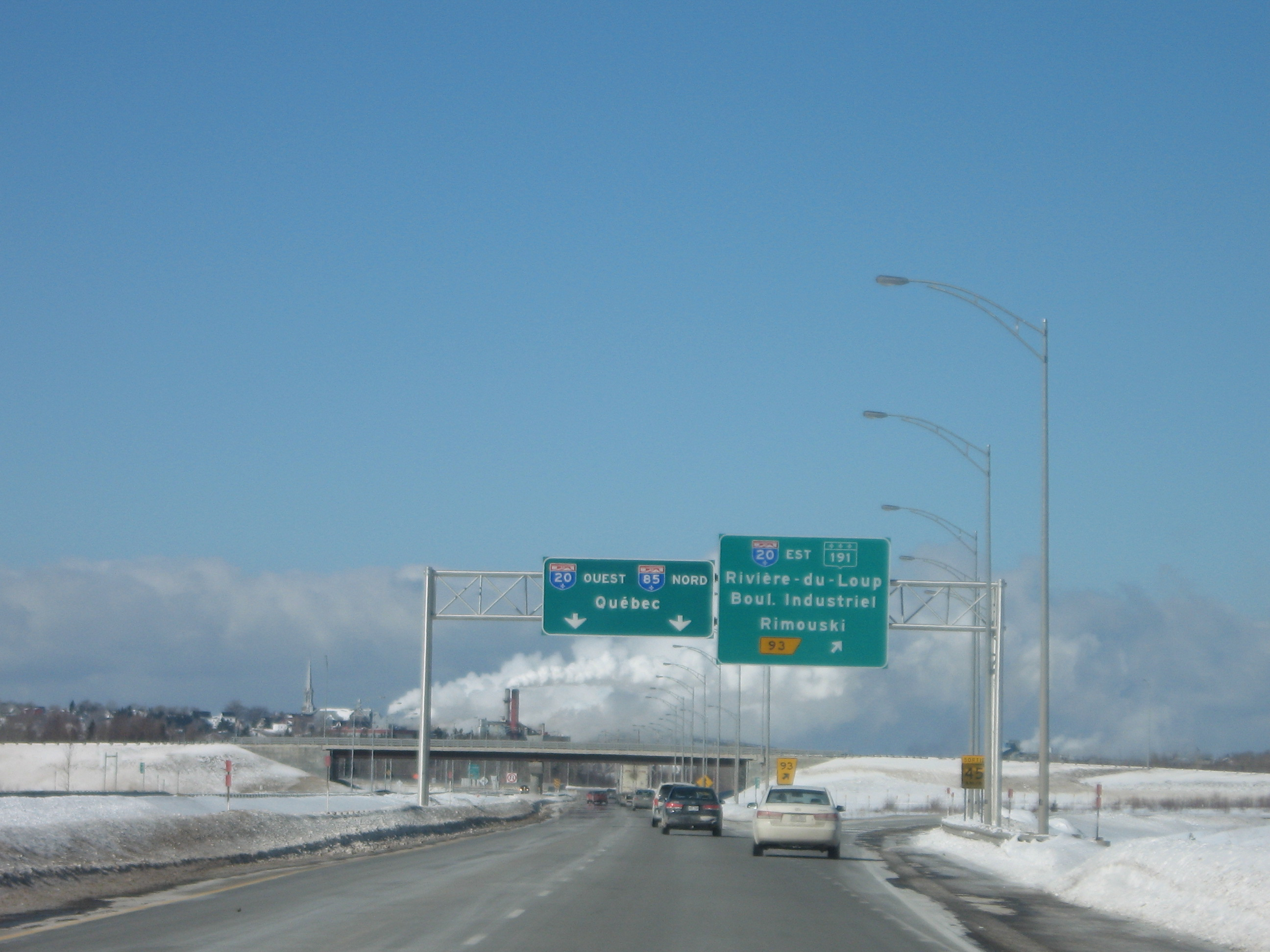
A-85 in Rivière-du-Loup looking north towards the Saint Lawrence River, in 2008

Previously, the highway was signed as Route 185, a two-lane highway with passing lanes. Often cited as one of the most dangerous highways in Canada, it was upgraded to autoroute standards as a four-lane, fully controlled-access highway and assuming the A-85 designation. This upgrade closed the last gap in a continuous freeway section of the Trans-Canada between Renfrew, Ontario, and Lower South River, Nova Scotia, a length of over 1,500 kilometres (930 mi), and for an even longer interprovincial freeway route between Windsor, Ontario, and Halifax, Nova Scotia, via Toronto and Montreal, a length of about 2,150 kilometres (1,340 mi), roughly playing the same role that the old Route 2 (which Route 185 was formerly part of) played before its renumbering into several roads in the early 1970s. The upgrade of Route 185 to A-85 was completed in October 2026 through federal and provincial funding over a period of about 25 years.

The first section of A-85 that was built stretched from km 94 in Rivière-du-Loup to A-20 at km 100. This section opened in 1972 as Route 185.

In 2002, a bypass of Notre-Dame-du-Lac was built, then in 2004, a bypass of Dégelis was constructed.

In 2005, the initial segment saw an extension south to km 88 in Saint-Antonin. The freeway was officially signed as A-85 from km 88 to km 100 in anticipation of the conversion of Route 185.

In 2009, bypasses of Cabano and Saint-Louis-du-Ha! Ha! opened, and in 2011, those bypasses were connected.

In 2013, the bypass of Dégelis was extended both ways, with the new freeway stretching from km 8 to km 22. It would be extended further south and tied into New Brunswick Route 2 in 2014.

Also in 2014, the Notre-Dame-du-Lac and Cabano bypasses were connected, and then in 2015, the freeway was extended to km 48.

In 2021 and 2022, the initial segment saw further extension south, with the new freeway stretching from km 76 to km 100. Another separate segment was constructed between km 56 and km 62. By October 2024, the section between km 62 and 76 was completed and opened. The entire freeway was connected on October 23, 2026. As of April 28, 2025, the last of the at-grade intersections (at Rue Principale) was permanently closed.

== Exit list ==
| RCM | Location | km | mi | Exit | Destinations | Notes |
|---|---|---|---|---|---|---|
| Témiscouata | Dégelis | 0.0 | 0.0 | – | Route 2 (TCH) east – Edmundston, Fredericton | Continuation into New Brunswick; Trans-Canada Highway continues east |
| Témiscouata | Dégelis | 0.75 | 0.47 | 1 | Avenue de la Madawaska | Southbound access is from New Brunswick Route 2 |
| Témiscouata | Dégelis | 7.2 | 4.5 | 7 | Traverse Johnny-Griffin | |
| Témiscouata | Dégelis | 12.4 | 7.7 | 12 | Rue Industrielle / Avenue du Longeron | Southbound exit and entrance |
| Témiscouata | Dégelis | 13.5 | 8.4 | 12 | R-295 (7^{e} Rue) / Rue Industrielle – Dégelis, Saint-Jean-de-la-Lande, Saint-Juste-du-Lac | Northbound exit and entrance |
| Témiscouata | Dégelis | 14.4 | 8.9 | 14 | R-295 (7^{e} Rue) – Dégelis, Saint-Jean-de-la-Lande, Saint-Juste-du-Lac | No northbound exit |
| Témiscouata | Dégelis | 15.4 | 9.6 | 14 | Avenue Principale – Packington | Northbound exit and entrance |
| Témiscouata | Témiscouata-sur-le-Lac | 24.5 | 15.2 | 24 | Chemin du Lac, Packington | Access via Route Saint Benoit |
| Témiscouata | Témiscouata-sur-le-Lac | 28.2– 28.9 | 17.5– 18.0 | 29 | Rue de l'Église / Rue Commerciale – Saint-Eusèbe, Notre-Dame-du-Lac | |
| Témiscouata | Témiscouata-sur-le-Lac | 29.6 | 18.4 | 30 | Rue Commerciale | Northbound exit and entrance |
| Témiscouata | Témiscouata-sur-le-Lac | 32.5 | 20.2 | 33 | Montée du Détour | |
| Témiscouata | Témiscouata-sur-le-Lac | 37.2 | 23.1 | 37 | R-232 west (Rue Cascades) – Rivière-Bleue, Pohénégamook | South end of R-232 concurrency |
| Témiscouata | Témiscouata-sur-le-Lac | 39.9 | 24.8 | 40 | R-232 east (Rue Commerciale) – Saint-Michel-du-Squatec, Rimouski | North end of R-232 concurrency |
| Témiscouata | Saint-Louis-du-Ha! Ha! | 47.5 | 29.5 | 47 | Saint-Louis-du-Ha! Ha!, Saint-Elzéar-de-Témiscouata | Access via Rue Raymond |
| Témiscouata | Saint-Honoré-de-Témiscouata | 56 | 35 | 56 | Rue Principale | Northbound exit and southbound entrance; Part of Phase III extension |
| Témiscouata | Saint-Honoré-de-Témiscouata | 60 | 37 | 60 | R-291 north – Saint-Honoré-de-Témiscouata, Saint-Pierre-de-Lamy, Saint-Hubert-de-Rivière-du-Loup | Part of Phase III extension |
| Témiscouata | Saint-Honoré-de-Témiscouata | 66 | 41 | 66 | Chemin Couturier | Southbound exit and northbound entrance; Part of Phase III extension |
| Rivière-du-Loup | Saint-Hubert-de-Rivière-du-Loup | 71 | 44 | 71 | Kataskomiq / Saint-Hubert-de-Rivière-du-Loup / Saint-Cyprien | Part of Phase III extension |
| Rivière-du-Loup | Saint-Antonin | 85 | 53 | 85 | Chemin de Rivière-Verte | Part of Phase III extension |
| Rivière-du-Loup | Saint-Antonin | 89.2 | 55.4 | 89 | Rue Principale – Saint-Antonin | |
| Rivière-du-Loup | Saint-Antonin | 90.4 | 56.2 | 90 | 1^{er} Rang – Saint-Modeste, Saint-Antonin | Southbound exit and northbound entrance |
| Rivière-du-Loup | Rivière-du-Loup | 93.4 | 58.0 | 93 | R-191 (Boulevard Industriel) to A-20 east – Rivière-du-Loup, Rimouski | |
| Rivière-du-Loup | Rivière-du-Loup | 96.0 | 59.7 | 96 | Chemin Fraserville – Rivière-du-Loup | |
| Rivière-du-Loup | Rivière-du-Loup | 97.6 | 60.6 | Fraserville Rest Stop (Northbound) | | |
| Rivière-du-Loup | Notre-Dame-du-Portage | 99.9 | 62.1 | 100 | A-20 (TCH) west – Québec | Eastbound exit, westbound entrance; exit 499 on A-20; Trans-Canada Highway follows A-20 west |
1.000 mi = 1.609 km; 1.000 km = 0.621 mi: Concurrency terminus; Incomplete access; Route transition

Trans-Canada Highway
| Previous route Autoroute 20 | Autoroute 85 | Next route NB Route 2 |
