= Denis Tardif =

Canadian politician

Member of the National Assembly of Quebec for Rivière-du-Loup–Témiscouata
- In office October 1, 2018 – August 28, 2022
- Preceded by: Jean D'Amour
- Succeeded by: Amélie Dionne

Personal details
- Party: Coalition Avenir Québec (2018–2020; 2021–present)
- Other political affiliations: Conservative (federal); Independent (2020–2021)
- Occupation: Political organizer

Denis Tardif is a Canadian politician, who was elected to the National Assembly of Quebec in the 2018 provincial election. He represents the electoral district of Rivière-du-Loup–Témiscouata as a member of the Coalition Avenir Québec.

Tardif previous worked as a regional organizer for the Conservative Party of Canada and served as a municipal councillor in Rivière-du-Loup between 2005 and 2011.

On December 17, 2020, he was removed from the CAQ caucus, following the release of a video showing him in a large private gathering, maskless and not socially distancing amid the COVID-19 pandemic in Quebec. He was reinstated into the caucus on April 12, 2021.
