= Saint-Antonin, Quebec =

Saint-Antonin
- City
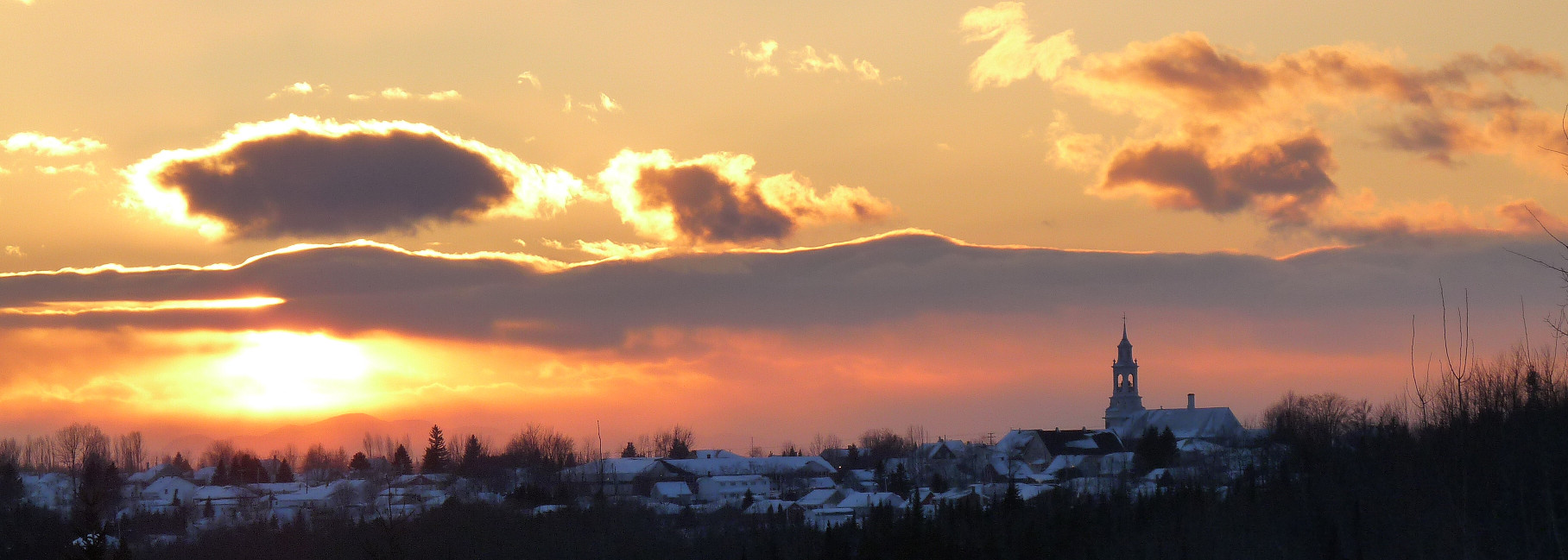
- Saint-Antonin seen from 3e Rang

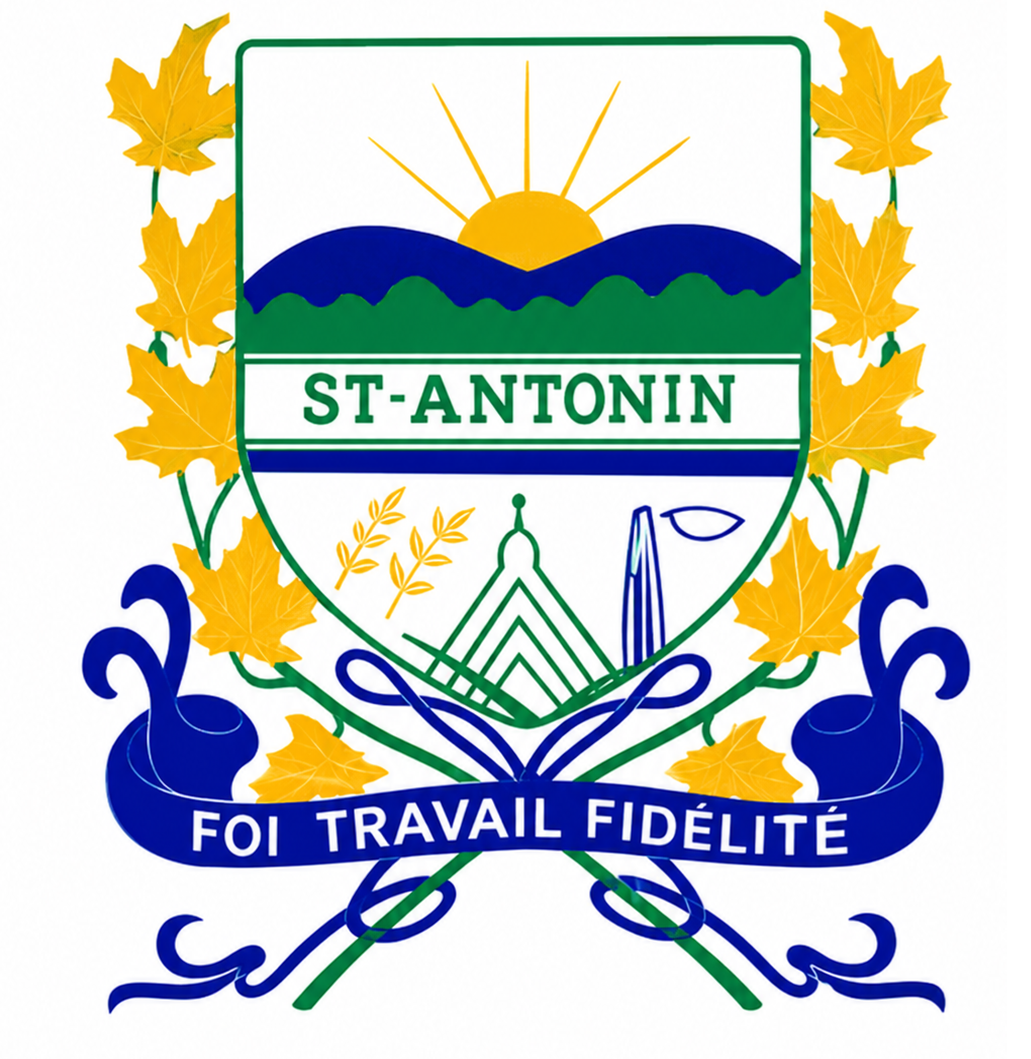
- Coat of arms

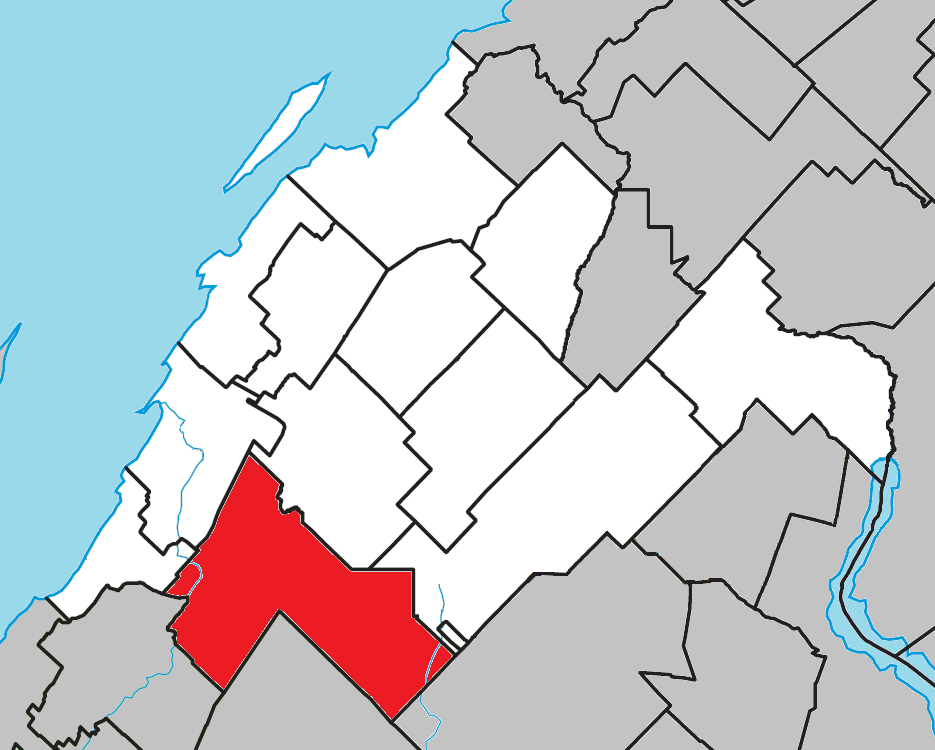
- Location within Rivière-du-Loup RCM

- Location in eastern Quebec
- Coordinates: 47°46′N 69°29′W
- Country: Canada
- Province: Quebec
- Region: Bas-Saint-Laurent
- RCM: Rivière-du-Loup
- Constituted: August 30, 1856
- Named for: Louis-Antonin Proulx

Government
  - Mayor: Denis Fortin
  - Federal riding: Côte-du-Sud—Rivière-du-Loup—Kataskomiq—Témiscouata
  - Prov. riding: Rivière-du-Loup–Témiscouata–Les Basques

Area
  - Total: 175.10 km^{2} (67.61 sq mi)
  - Land: 175.93 km^{2} (67.93 sq mi)
- There is an apparent contradiction between two authoritative sources

Population (2021)
  - Total: 4,338
  - Density: 24.7/km^{2} (64/sq mi)
  - Pop 2016-2021: ▲7.1%
  - Dwellings: 1,990
- Time zone: UTC−5 (EST)
  - Summer (DST): UTC−4 (EDT)
- Postal code(s): G0L 2J0
- Area codes: 418 and 581
- Highways A-85 (TCH): R-185 (TCH)
- Website: www.municipalite.saint-antonin.qc.ca

Saint-Antonin (French pronunciation: [sɛ̃t‿ɑ̃tɔnɛ̃]) is a city in the Bas-Saint-Laurent region of Quebec, Canada, a few kilometres south of the city of Rivière-du-Loup, in Rivière-du-Loup Regional County Municipality. The municipality is named after Louis-Antonin or Antoine Proulx (1810-1896), priest of Fraserville (Rivière-du-Loup) and was founded in 1856.

On November 1, 2014, Saint-Antonin was changed from a parish municipality to a (regular) municipality.

On December 4, 2021, Saint-Antonin was changed again, being upgraded to a ville (town).

== Demographics ==
Population trend:

- Population in 2021: 4,338 (2016 to 2021 population change: 7.1%)
- Population in 2016: 4,049
- Population in 2011: 4,027
- Population in 2006: 3,780
- Population in 2001: 3,395
- Population in 1996: 3,368
- Population in 1991: 3,268
- Population in 1986: 3,160
- Population in 1981: 3,075
- Population in 1976: 2,586
- Population in 1971: 2,243
- Population in 1966: 2,132
- Population in 1961: 1,983
- Population in 1956: 1,834
- Population in 1951: 1,632
- Population in 1941: 1,530
- Population in 1931: 1,409
- Population in 1921: 1,222
- Population in 1911: 1,271
- Population in 1901: 1,186
- Population in 1891: 1,079
- Population in 1881: 1,234
- Population in 1871: 1,185
- Population in 1861: 891

Private dwellings occupied by usual residents: 1,889 (total dwellings: 1,990)

Mother tongue:

- English as first language: 0.3%
- French as first language: 99.1%
- English and French as first language: 0.3%
- Other as first language: 0.2%

== Education ==
Centre de services scolaire de Kamouraska - Rivière-du-Loup operates francophone public schools:

- École Lanouette

The Eastern Shores School Board operates anglophone public schools:

- Metis Beach School in Métis-sur-Mer

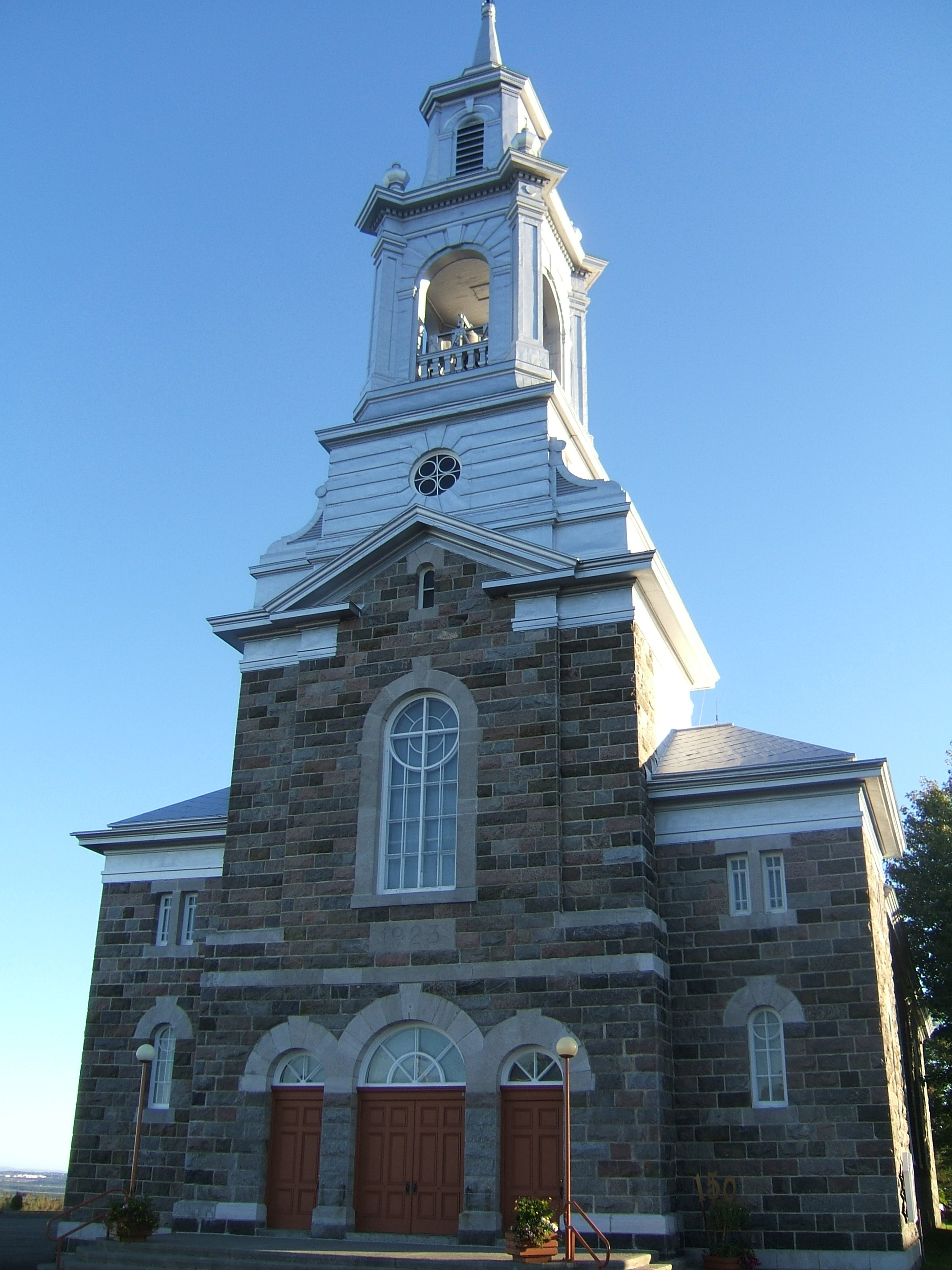
Saint Antonin Church
