= Saint-Hubert-de-Rivière-du-Loup =

- Municipality
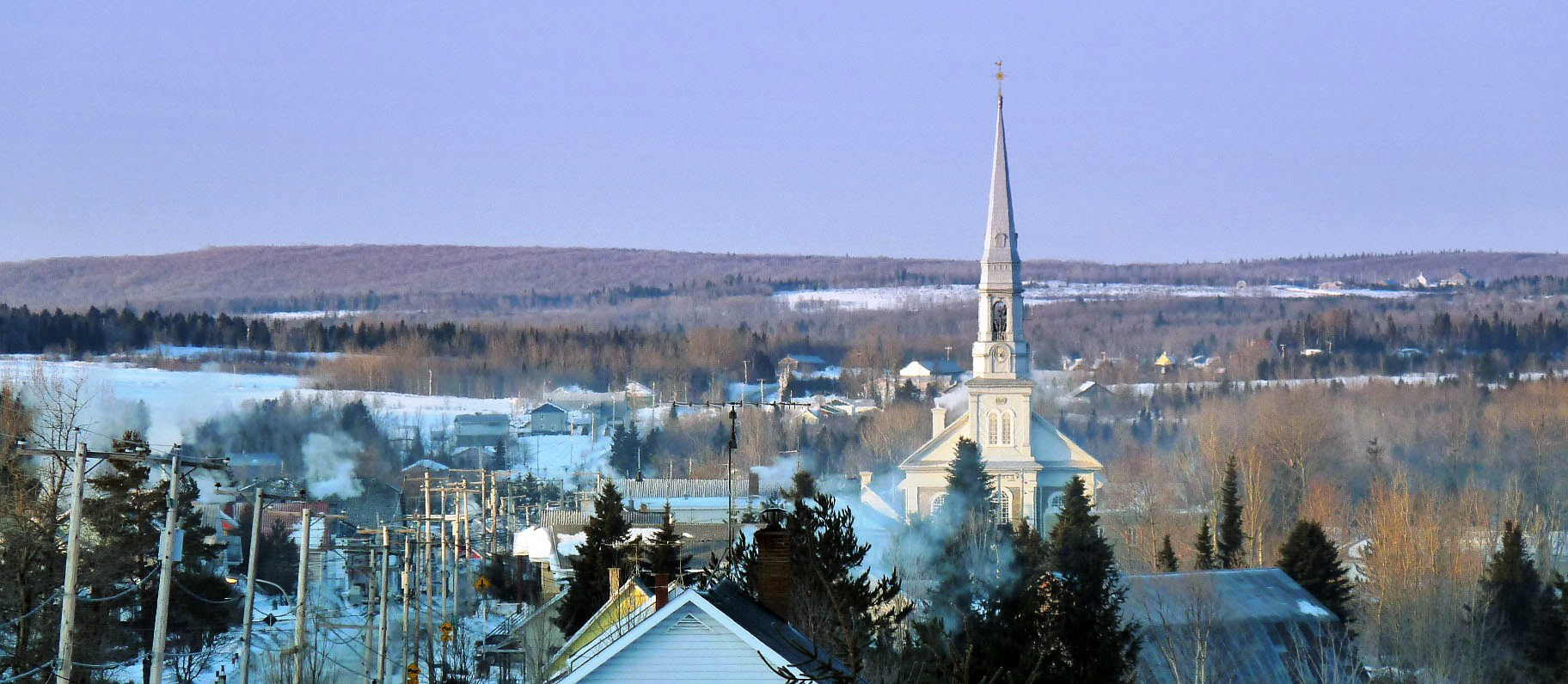
- Westward view from Chemin Taché

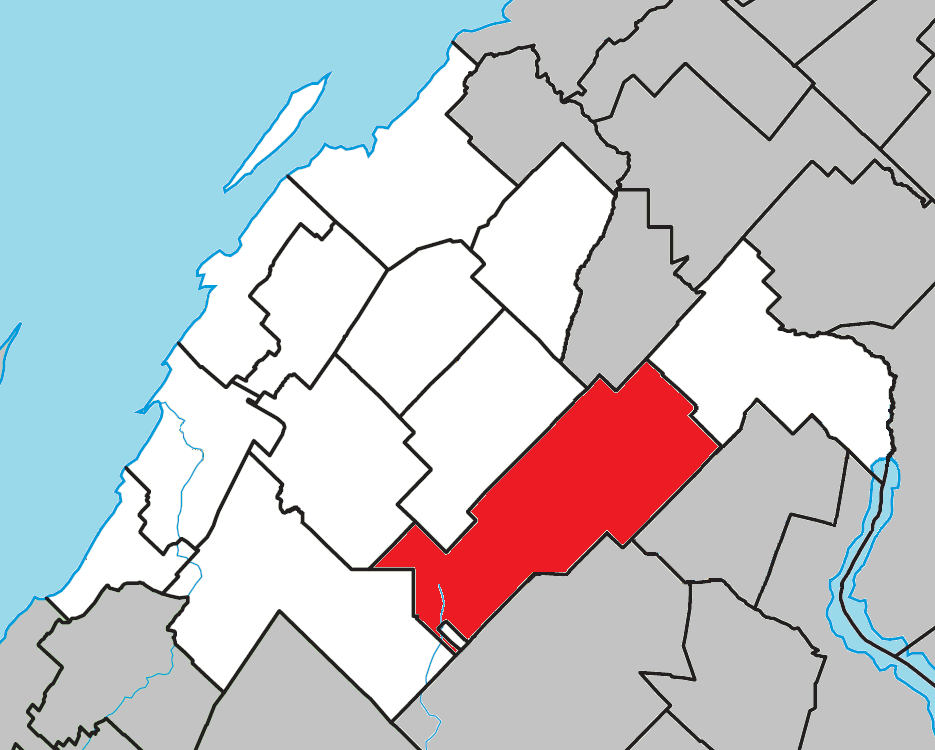
- Location within Rivière-du-Loup RCM

- Location in eastern Quebec
- Coordinates: 47°49′N 69°09′W
- Country: Canada
- Province: Quebec
- Region: Bas-Saint-Laurent
- RCM: Rivière-du-Loup
- Constituted: January 4, 1894
- Named for: Hubertus and Rivière-du-Loup

Government
  - Mayor: Josée Ouellet
  - Federal riding: Côte-du-Sud—Rivière-du-Loup—Kataskomiq—Témiscouata
  - Prov. riding: Rivière-du-Loup–Témiscouata–Les Basques

Area
  - Total: 198.60 km^{2} (76.68 sq mi)
  - Land: 192.20 km^{2} (74.21 sq mi)

Population (2021)
  - Total: 1,412
  - Density: 7.3/km^{2} (19/sq mi)
  - Pop 2016-2021: ▲10.4%
  - Dwellings: 1,019
- Time zone: UTC−5 (EST)
  - Summer (DST): UTC−4 (EDT)
- Postal code(s): G0L 3L0
- Area codes: 418 and 581
- Highways: R-291
- Website: www.municipalite.saint-hubert-de-riviere-du-loup.qc.ca

Saint-Hubert-de-Rivière-du-Loup (French pronunciation: [sɛ̃t‿ybɛʁ də ʁivjɛʁ dy lu]) is a municipality in Quebec, Canada, in the administrative region of Bas-Saint-Laurent and the regional county municipality of Rivière-du-Loup.

== Geography ==
Located in the Notre Dame Mountains, the municipality is dotted with several large lakes, including Grande-Fourche, Saint-Hubert and Saint-François, which attract many holidaymakers. Several watercourses in the Trois Pistoles River watershed flow through the municipality. From Lac de la Grande Fourche in the centre, the Sénescoupé River flows northeast. The Toupiké River crosses the southwest to the northeast. The Petite Fourche River crosses the south-west to its confluence with the Toupiké River. The Plate River crosses the south-east tip towards the north-east. The Mariakèche River makes a brief incursion into the north-west.

Saint-Hubert-de-Rivière-du-Loup is crossed by Route 291.

== Demographics ==
In the 2021 Census of Population conducted by Statistics Canada, Saint-Hubert-de-Rivière-du-Loup had a population of 1,412 living in 646 of its 1,019 total private dwellings, a change of 10.4% from its 2016 population of 1,279. With a land area of 192.20 km^{2} (74.21 sq mi), it had a population density of 7.3/km^{2} (19.0/sq mi) in 2021.

== Notable people ==
- Leo Kerouac, father of author and poet Jack Kerouac

== See also ==
- List of municipalities in Quebec
