= Saint-Honoré-de-Témiscouata =

- Municipality
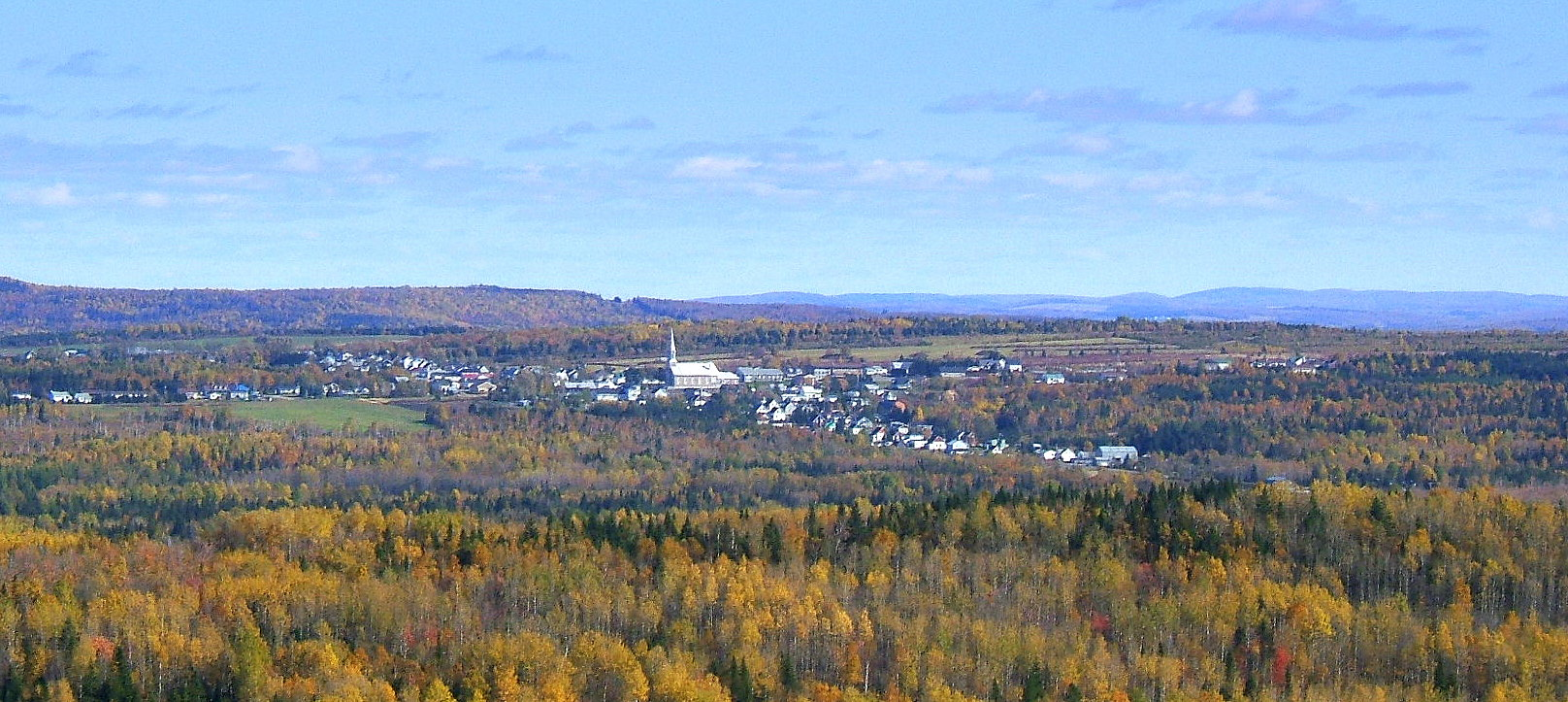

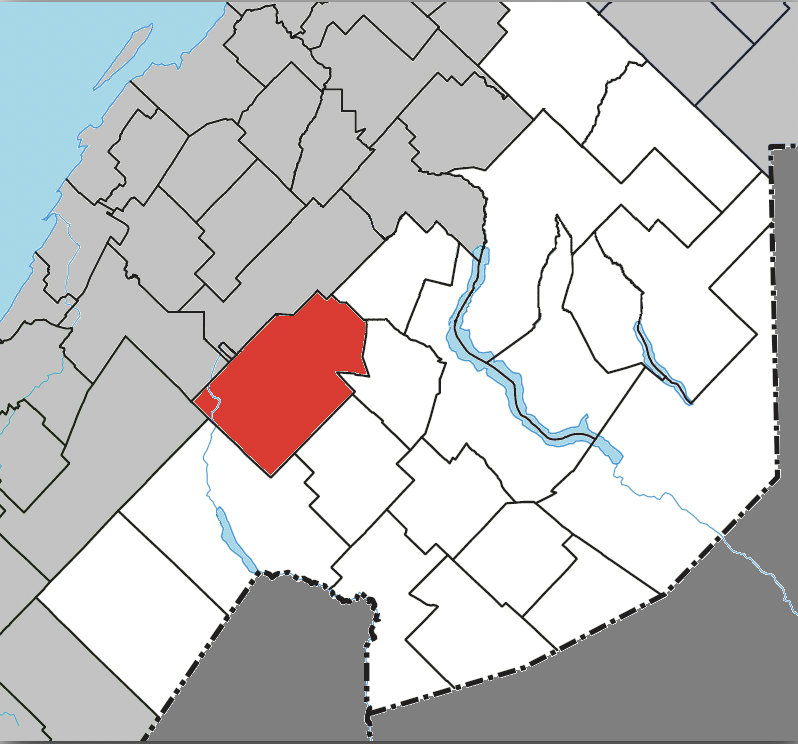
- Location within Témiscouata RCM

- Location in eastern Quebec
- Coordinates: 47°42′N 69°08′W
- Country: Canada
- Province: Quebec
- Region: Bas-Saint-Laurent
- RCM: Témiscouata
- Constituted: January 1, 1881

Government
  - Mayor: Richard F. Dubé
  - Federal riding: Côte-du-Sud—Rivière-du-Loup—Kataskomiq—Témiscouata
  - Prov. riding: Rivière-du-Loup–Témiscouata–Les Basques

Area
  - Total: 262.10 km^{2} (101.20 sq mi)
  - Land: 262.97 km^{2} (101.53 sq mi)
- There is an apparent contradiction between two authoritative sources

Population (2021)
  - Total: 763
  - Density: 2.9/km^{2} (7.5/sq mi)
  - Pop 2016-2021: ▲3.0%
  - Dwellings: 356
- Time zone: UTC−5 (EST)
  - Summer (DST): UTC−4 (EDT)
- Postal code(s): G0L 3K0
- Area codes: 418 and 581
- Highways A-85 (TCH): R-185 (TCH); R-291
- Website: www.sainthonore detemiscouata.ca

Saint-Honoré-de-Témiscouata (French pronunciation: [sɛ̃t‿ɔnɔʁe də temiskwata]; Canada 2021 Census population 763) is a municipality in the region of Bas-Saint-Laurent, Quebec, Canada.

== Demographics ==
=== Population ===
Population trend:

| Census | Population | Change (%) |
|---|---|---|
| 2021 | 763 | ▲3.0% |
| 2016 | 741 | ▼5.0% |
| 2011 | 780 | ▼3.3% |
| 2006 | 807 | ▲0.4% |
| 2001 | 804 | ▼4.1% |
| 1996 | 838 | ▼0.6% |
| 1991 | 843 | ▼9.2% |
| 1986 | 928 | ▼4.1% |
| 1981 | 968 | ▼5.2% |
| 1976 | 1,021 | ▼11.1% |
| 1971 | 1,148 | ▼9.2% |
| 1966 | 1,264 | ▼22.7% |
| 1961 | 1,635 | ▼2.6% |
| 1956 | 1,678 | ▲1.0% |
| 1951 | 1,662 | ▲19.5% |
| 1941 | 1,391 | ▲36.2% |
| 1931 | 1,021 | ▼18.8% |
| 1921 | 1,257 | ▲30.8% |
| 1911 | 961 | ▲112.1% |
| 1901 | 453 | ▲45.2% |
| 1891 | 312 | N/A |

=== Language ===
Mother tongue (2021)

| Language | Population | Pct (%) |
|---|---|---|
| French only | 750 | 98.7% |
| English only | 10 | 1.3% |
| Other languages | 0 | 0.0% |

== Notable people ==
François-Xavier Ross was assigned to the municipality for a period.

== See also ==
- List of municipalities in Quebec
