= L'Isle-Verte =

- Municipality
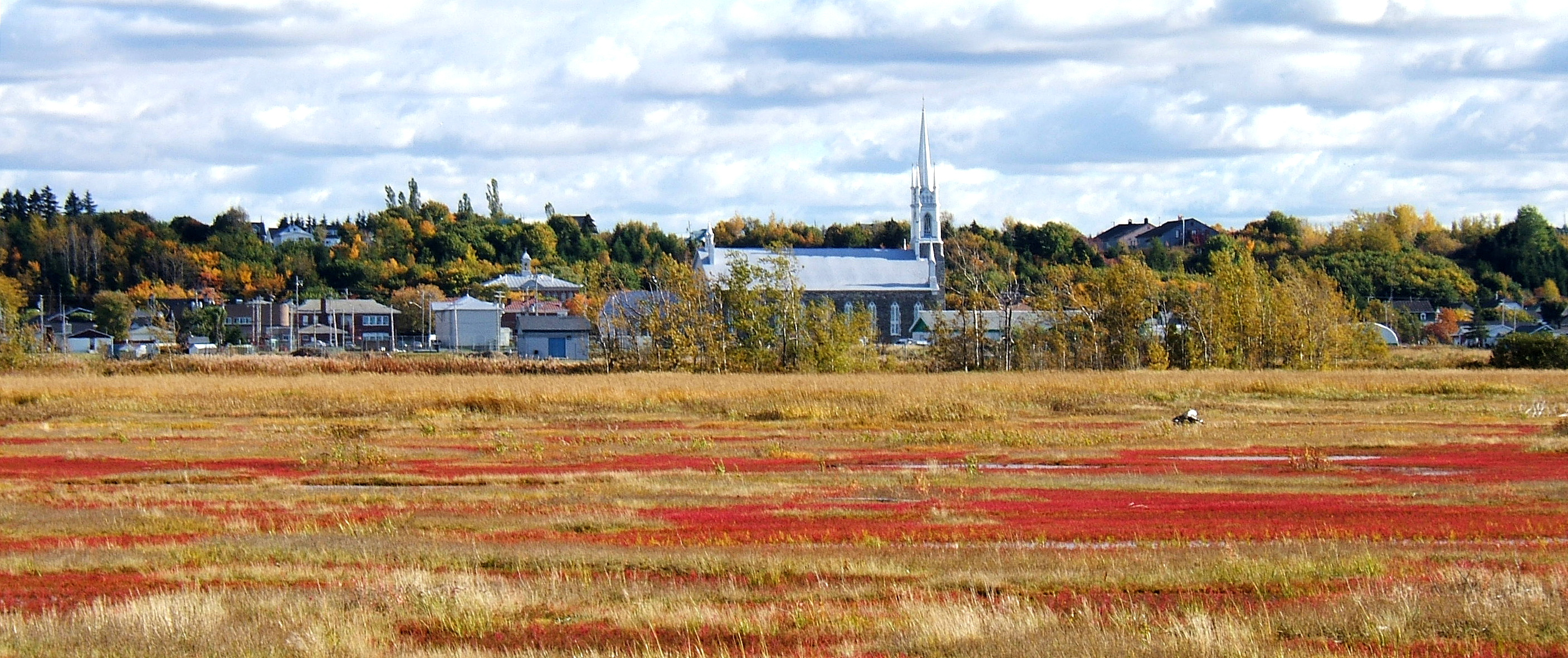
- L'Isle-Verte as seen from the Saint-Lawrence River

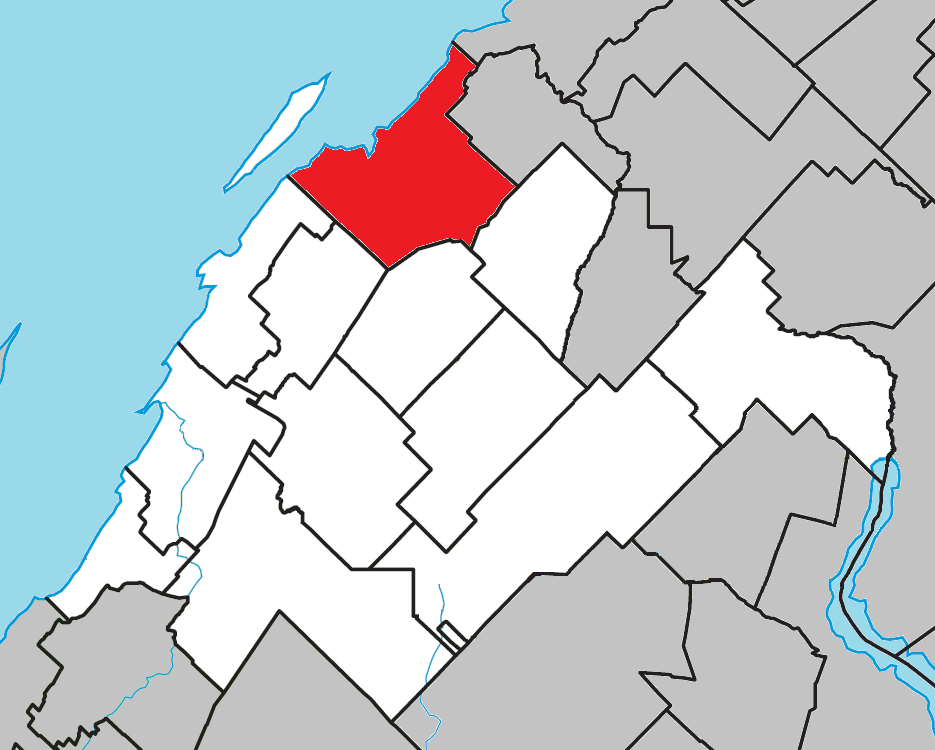
- Location within Rivière-du-Loup RCM.

- Location in eastern Quebec.
- Coordinates: 48°01′N 69°20′W
- Country: Canada
- Province: Quebec
- Region: Bas-Saint-Laurent
- RCM: Rivière-du-Loup
- Constituted: February 9, 2000

Government
  - Mayor: Monic Vézina
  - Federal riding: Côte-du-Sud—Rivière-du-Loup—Kataskomiq—Témiscouata
  - Prov. riding: Rivière-du-Loup–Témiscouata–Les Basques

Area
  - Total: 222.00 km^{2} (85.71 sq mi)
  - Land: 119.15 km^{2} (46.00 sq mi)

Population (2021)
  - Total: 1,356
  - Density: 11.4/km^{2} (30/sq mi)
  - Pop 2016-2021: ▲4.8%
  - Dwellings: 697
- Time zone: UTC−5 (EST)
  - Summer (DST): UTC−4 (EDT)
- Postal code(s): G0L 1K0
- Area code: 418
- Highways A-20: R-132
- Website: www.municipalite. lisle-verte.qc.ca

L'Isle-Verte (French pronunciation: [lil vɛʁt]) is a small municipality located along the south shore of the Saint Lawrence River, in the Rivière-du-Loup Regional County Municipality of the Bas-Saint-Laurent region, Quebec, Canada. The name of the village refers to Île Verte (French for "Green Island"), a nearby island that is not within its municipal boundaries. Village and island are joined by a seasonal ferry.

It is known for its lamb, fed in a salted marsh, a luxury product in Quebec. Its marshes along the Saint Lawrence River are a protected bird sanctuary part of the Baie de l'Isle-Verte Ramsar wetland.

On January 23, 2014, a major fire destroyed the Résidence du Havre, a home for the elderly, killing thirty-two residents.

== Demographics ==
Population trend:

- Population in 2021: 1,356 (2016 to 2021 population change: 4.8%)
- Population in 2016: 1,294 (2011 to 2016 population change: -11.9%)
- Population in 2011: 1,469 (2006 to 2011 population change: 0.3%)
- Population in 2006: 1,464
- Population in 2001: 1,519

Private dwellings occupied by usual residents: 643 (total dwellings: 697)

Languages:

- English as first language: 0.7%
- French as first language: 97.8%
- English and French as first language: 0.4%
- Other as first language: 0.7%

La Rivière Verte (Green river) that crosses the municipality

== Notable people ==
- Charles Borromée Rouleau was born in L'Isle-Verte in 1840.

== See also ==
- List of municipalities in Quebec
