= L'âne de Carpizan =

Trans satirical quebec novel

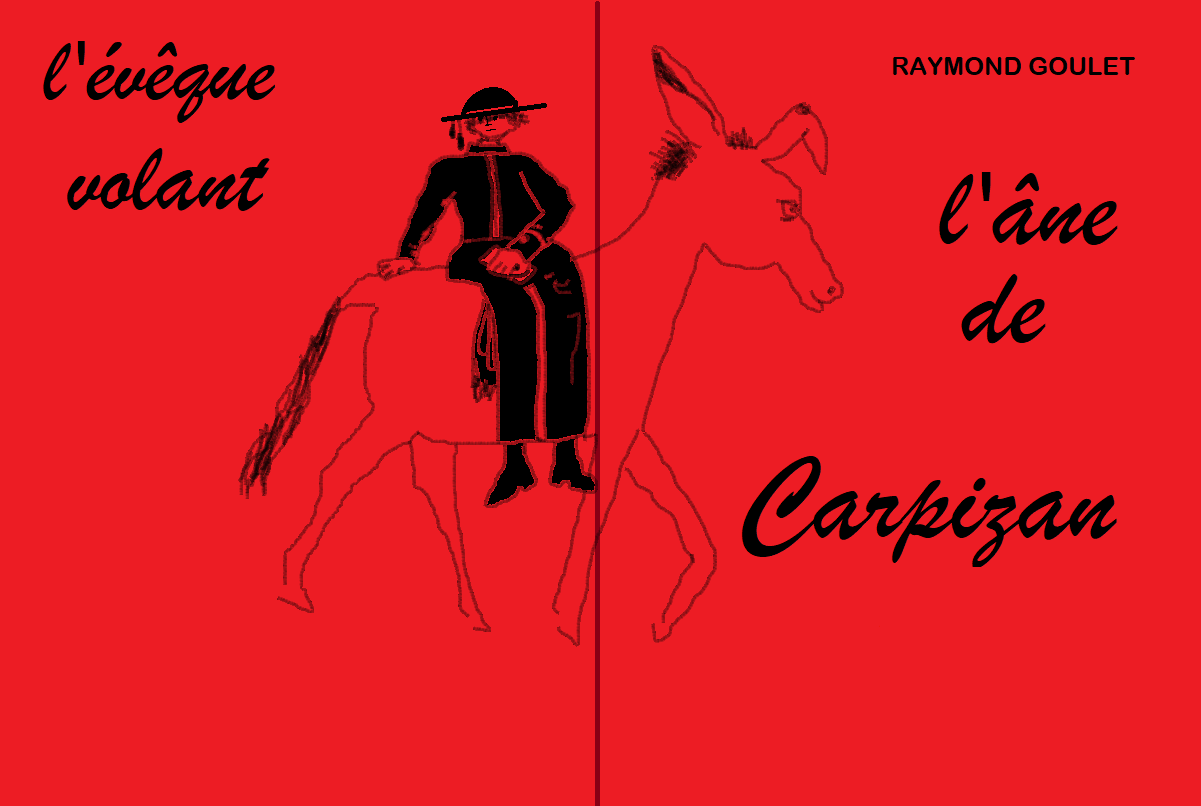
- Recreation of the original book cover using MSPaint
- Author: Raymond Goulet
- Original title: L'âne de Carpizan ou l'évêque volant
- Language: French
- Subject: Anticlericalism, trans identity
- Genre: Novel, satire
- Publication date: 1957
- Publication place: Quebec
- ISBN: 978-2-924039-21-2

L'âne de Carpizan is a satirical novel from Quebec written by louperivian writer Raymond Goulet, dancer and dance professor, autopublished in 1957. and re-edited by Moult Éditions in 2019.

When published, the book was described as being the most irreverencious quebec novel, and later as a punch, an anticlerical charge, an ubuesque crazy and surrealist pamphlet

It is the first known novel written in Quebec in which the narratives revolves around trans identity.

== Publication ==
The Éditions du Cadenas credited on the original edition never existed, it was rather a reference to the Padlock Law. As of 1957, the work was self-published and distributed directly by its author, who abandoned this effort for it was too difficult to deal with.

== Reception ==
Upon its publishing in 1957, L'âne de Carpizan initially wasn't received by the critics who didn't notice it. Its parution was however confirmed in a single publicity claim published in Le Devoir in november 1957.

Its first important mention can be found in a Photo-journal article published ten years later, in 1967. The journalist Roch Poisson relates Adrien Thério's words, announcing the parution of an anthology dedicated to comedy in French Canadian literature.

In the end, excepting Therio's anthology, his desire to eventually republish it, some publicity claims and interviews with the author, the novel's reception was limited to its mention in bibliographic works.

In the fourth tome of the Dictionnaire des oeuvres littéraires du Québec (1982), the book is described as a wacky tale and a disappointing surprise.
