= Ariane Boyer =

Canadian politician

Ariane Boyer MNA

Member of the National Assembly for Rivière-du-Loup–Témiscouata–Les Basques
- Incumbent
- Assumed office October 5, 2026
- Preceded by: Amélie Dionne

Personal details
- Party: Parti Québécois

Ariane Boyer is a Canadian politician who is a candidate for the National Assembly of Quebec for Rivière-du-Loup–Témiscouata–Les Basques in the 2026 Quebec general election as a member of the Parti Québécois.

Boyer was a journalist for CIMT-DT and CFER-DT.

== Electoral record ==
2026 Quebec general election: Rivière-du-Loup–Témiscouata–Les Basques
** Preliminary results — Not yet official **
Party	Candidate	Votes	%	±%
Parti Québécois	Ariane Boyer	12,745	35.29	
Conservative	Louise Moreault	8,306	23.00	
Coalition Avenir Québec	Amélie Dionne	7,110	19.69	
Liberal	Karine Malenfant	5,189	14.37	
Québec solidaire	Pierre-Erik Isabelle	2,434	6.74	
Climat Québec	Carole Sierpien	330	0.91	
Total valid votes				
Total rejected ballots				
Turnout			70.23	
Electors on the lists			–	–
Parti Québécois gain from Coalition Avenir Québec		Swing		+20.43
Source: Élections Québec
