= Saint-Arsène =

- Parish municipality
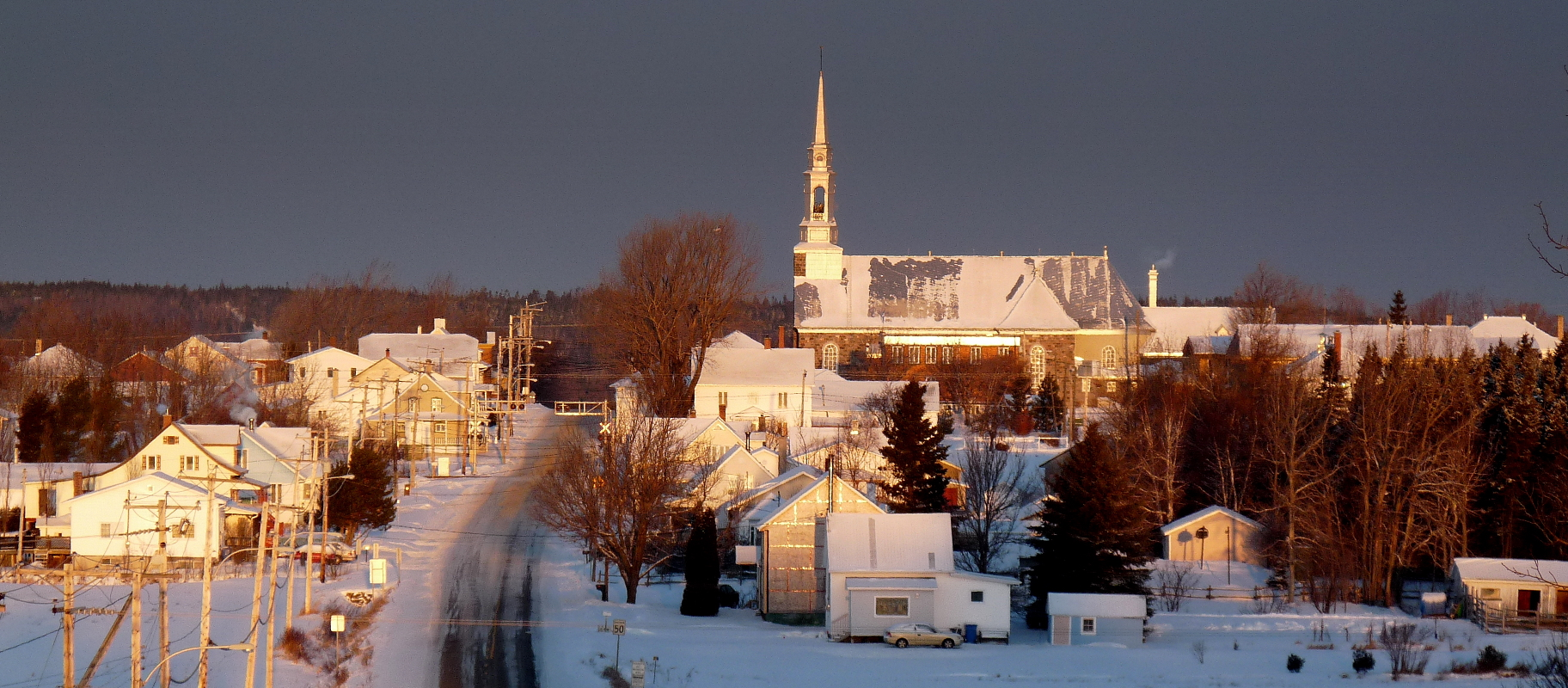

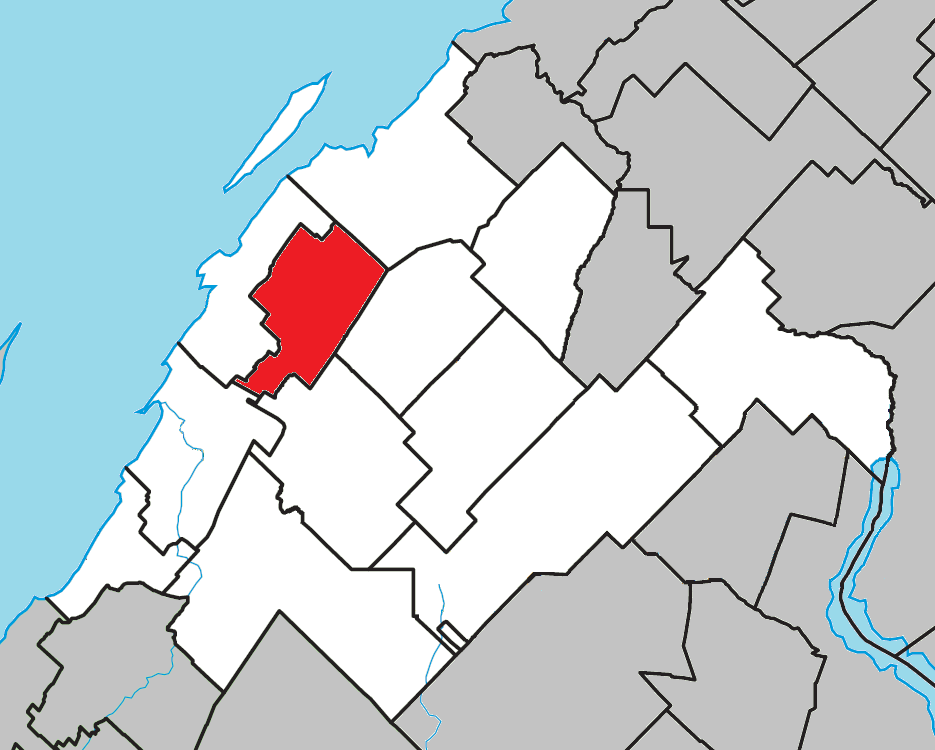
- Location within Rivière-du-Loup RCM

- Location in eastern Quebec
- Coordinates: 47°55′N 69°26′W
- Country: Canada
- Province: Quebec
- Region: Bas-Saint-Laurent
- RCM: Rivière-du-Loup
- Constituted: July 1, 1855

Government
  - Mayor: Mario Lebel
  - Federal riding: Côte-du-Sud—Rivière-du-Loup—Kataskomiq—Témiscouata
  - Prov. riding: Rivière-du-Loup–Témiscouata–Les Basques

Area
  - Total: 70.40 km^{2} (27.18 sq mi)
  - Land: 70.81 km^{2} (27.34 sq mi)
- There is an apparent contradiction between two authoritative sources

Population (2021)
  - Total: 1,245
  - Density: 17.6/km^{2} (46/sq mi)
  - Pop 2016-2021: ▲1.2%
  - Dwellings: 479
- Time zone: UTC−5 (EST)
  - Summer (DST): UTC−4 (EDT)
- Postal code(s): G0L 2K0
- Area codes: 418 and 581
- Highways A-20 (TCH): R-291
- Website: www.municipalite.saint-arsene.qc.ca

Saint-Arsène (French pronunciation: [sɛ̃t‿aʁsɛn]) is a parish municipality in Quebec, Canada.

== Demographics ==
In the 2021 Census of Population conducted by Statistics Canada, Saint-Arsène had a population of 1,245 living in 468 of its 479 total private dwellings, a change of 1.2% from its 2016 population of 1,230. With a land area of 70.81 km^{2} (27.34 sq mi), it had a population density of 17.6/km^{2} (45.5/sq mi) in 2021.

== See also ==
- List of parish municipalities in Quebec
