= Rivière-du-Loup Regional County Municipality =

Rivière-du-Loup
- Regional county municipality
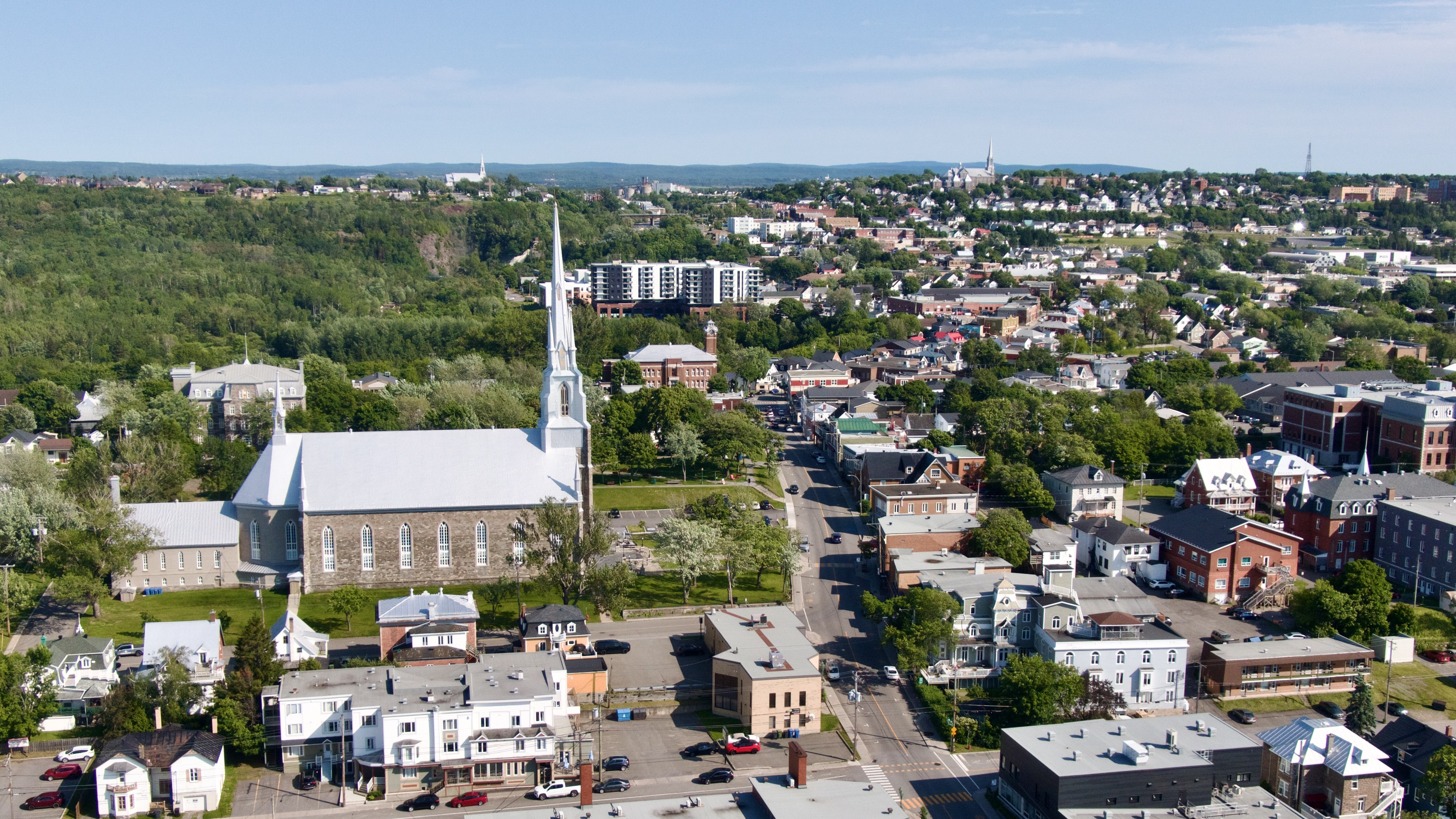
- Downtown Rivière-du-Loup

- Coordinates: 47°54′N 69°20′W
- Country: Canada
- Province: Quebec
- Region: Bas-Saint-Laurent
- Effective: January 1, 1982
- County seat: Rivière-du-Loup

Government
  - Type: Prefecture
  - Prefect: Michel Lagacé

Area
  - Total: 1,768.20 km^{2} (682.71 sq mi)
  - Land: 1,277.15 km^{2} (493.11 sq mi)

Population (2016)
  - Total: 33,958
  - Density: 26.6/km^{2} (69/sq mi)
  - Change 2011-2016: ▼1.2%
  - Dwellings: 17,019
- Time zone: UTC−5 (EST)
  - Summer (DST): UTC−4 (EDT)
- Area codes: 418 and 581
- Website: www.riviereduloup.ca

Rivière-du-Loup (French pronunciation: [ʁivjɛʁ dy lu]) is a regional county municipality in the Bas-Saint-Laurent region of Quebec, Canada. Its most important city is Rivière-du-Loup, which contains more than half of the population.

Major industries include pulp and paper, other wood products, peat products, mineral products and textiles.

The name comes from the French, "River of the Wolf".

== Subdivisions ==
There are 13 subdivisions and one native reserve within the RCM:

Cities & Towns (2)

- Rivière-du-Loup
- Saint-Antonin

Municipalities (9)

- Cacouna
- L'Isle-Verte
- Notre-Dame-du-Portage
- Saint-Cyprien
- Saint-Épiphane
- Saint-François-Xavier-de-Viger
- Saint-Hubert-de-Rivière-du-Loup
- Saint-Modeste
- Saint-Paul-de-la-Croix

Parishes (2)

- Notre-Dame-des-Sept-Douleurs
- Saint-Arsène

Native Reserves (1)
(not associated with RCM)

- Kataskomiq

== Transportation ==
=== Access Routes ===
Highways and numbered routes that run through the municipality, including external routes that start or finish at the county border:

- Autoroutes
  - A-20 (TCH)
  - A-85 (TCH)
- Principal Highways
  - R-132
  - R-185 (TCH)
  - R-191
- Secondary Highways
  - R-232
  - R-291
  - R-293
- External Routes
  - None

== See also ==
- List of regional county municipalities and equivalent territories in Quebec
