= Rivière-du-Loup =

- City
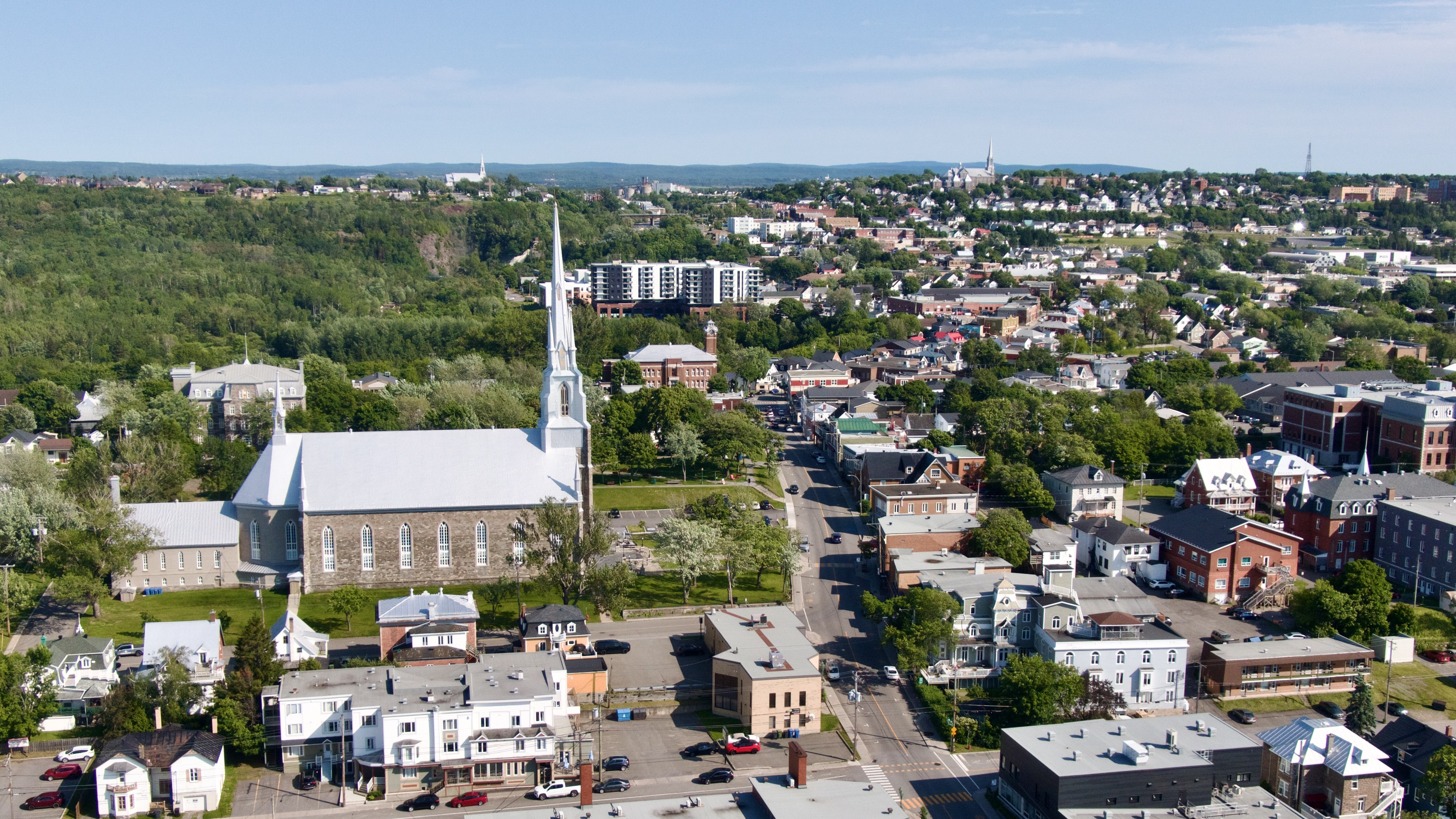
- Downtown Rivière-du-Loup

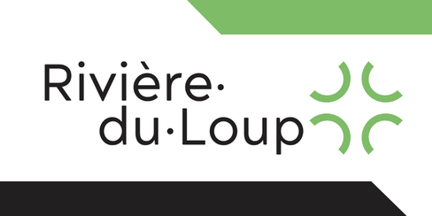
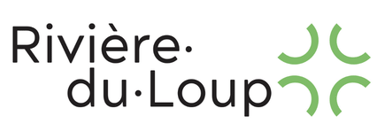
- Flag Seal

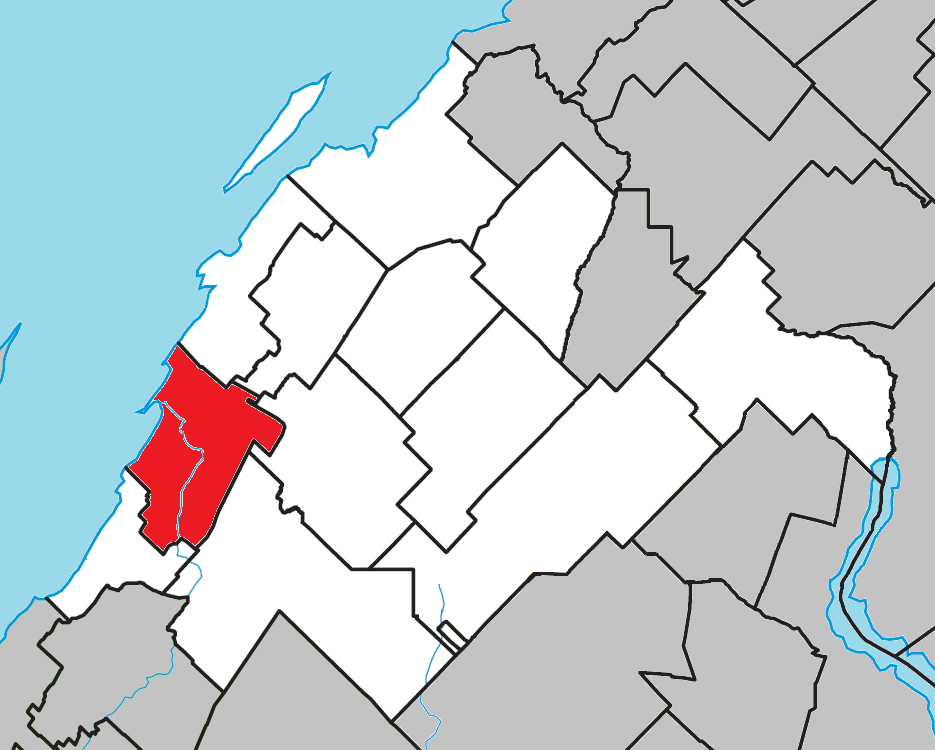
- Location within Rivière-du-Loup RCM

- Location in eastern Quebec
- Coordinates: 47°50′N 69°32′W
- Country: Canada
- Province: Quebec
- Region: Bas-Saint-Laurent
- RCM: Rivière-du-Loup
- Settled: 1850 as Fraserville
- Constituted: December 30, 1998

Government
  - Mayor: Mario Bastille
  - MP: Bernard Généreux (C)
  - MNA: Ariane Boyer (Q)

Area
  - City: 138.40 km^{2} (53.44 sq mi)
  - Land: 83.74 km^{2} (32.33 sq mi)
  - Urban: 20.17 km^{2} (7.79 sq mi)
  - Metro: 543.02 km^{2} (209.66 sq mi)

Population (2021)
  - City: 20,118
  - Density: 240.2/km^{2} (622/sq mi)
  - Urban: 19,081
  - Urban density: 945.8/km^{2} (2,450/sq mi)
  - Metro: 30,025
  - Metro density: 55.3/km^{2} (143/sq mi)
  - Pop 2016-2021: ▲3.1%
  - Dwellings: 10,045
- Time zone: UTC−5 (EST)
  - Summer (DST): UTC−4 (EDT)
- Postal code(s): G5R
- Area codes: 418 and 581
- Highways A-20 (TCH) A-85 (TCH): R-132; R-191; R-291
- Website: villerdl.ca

Rivière-du-Loup (French pronunciation: [ʁivjɛʁ dy lu]; 2021 population 20,118) is a small city on the south shore of the Saint Lawrence River in Quebec. The city is the seat for the Rivière-du-Loup Regional County Municipality and the judicial district of Kamouraska. It is one of the largest cities in Bas-Saint-Laurent.

== History ==
The city was named after the nearby river, whose name means Wolf's River in French. This name may have come from a native tribe known as "Les Loups" ("The Wolves") or from the many seals, known in French as loup-marin (sea wolves), once found at the river's mouth.

Rivière-du-Loup was established in 1673 as the seigneurie of Sieur Charles-Aubert de la Chesnaye. The community was incorporated as the village of Fraserville, in honour of early Scottish settler Alexander Fraser, in 1850, and became a city in 1910. The city reverted to its original name, Rivière-du-Loup, in 1919.

Between 1850 and 1919, the city saw large increases in its anglophone population. Most of them left the region by the 1950s. Only 1% of the population still speaks English as its first language.

In fall of 1950 Rivière-du-Loup was the site of a nuclear accident. A United States Air Force B-50 was returning a nuclear bomb to the United States. The bomb was released due to engine troubles, and then was destroyed in a non-nuclear detonation before it hit the ground. The explosion scattered nearly 100 pounds (45 kg) of uranium (U-238).

== Demographics ==
In the 2021 Census of Population conducted by Statistics Canada, Rivière-du-Loup had a population of 20,118 living in 9,482 of its 10,045 total private dwellings, a change of 3.1% from its 2016 population of 19,507. With a land area of 83.74 km^{2} (32.33 sq mi), it had a population density of 240.2/km^{2} (622.2/sq mi) in 2021.

Population trend:

- Population in 2021: 20,118 (2016 to 2021 population change: 3.1%)
- Population in 2016: 19,507
- Population in 2011: 19,447
- Population in 2006: 18,586
- Population in 2001: 17,772
- Population in 1996: 14,721
- Population in 1991: 14,017
- Population in 1986: 13,321
- Population in 1981: 13,459
- Population in 1976: 13,103
- Population in 1971: 12,774
- Population in 1966: 11,637
- Population in 1961: 10,835
- Population in 1956: 9,964
- Population in 1951: 9,425
- Population in 1941: 8,713
- Population in 1931: 8,499
- Population in 1921: 7,703
- Population in 1911: 6,774
- Population in 1901: 4,569
- Population in 1891: 4,175
- Population in 1881: 2,291
- Population in 1871: 1,541
- Population in 1861: 1,210
- Population in 1851: 880

== Arts and culture ==
Notable events in the city include the annual Festival Vues dans la tête de... film festival. It is also the birthplace of Raymond Goulet, author of the first Quebec novel showcasing trans themes.

== Infrastructure ==
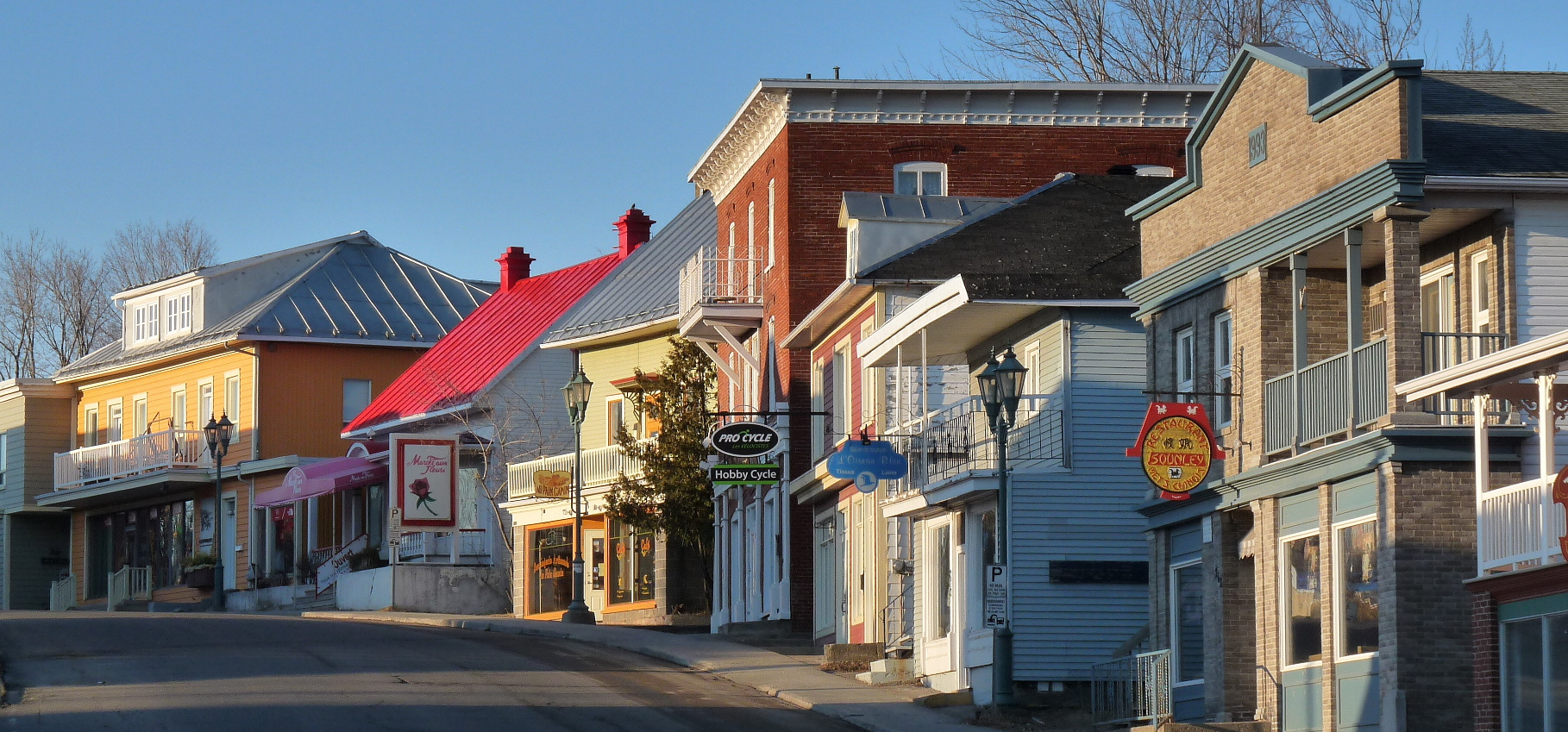
Rue LaFontaine is an important commercial street in Rivière-du-Loup.

Rivière-du-Loup is a traditional stopping point between Quebec City, the Maritimes and the Gaspé Peninsula. The Trans-Canada Highway turns south here, transferring from Autoroute 20 to Autoroute 85 and continuing southwards to Edmundston, New Brunswick.

There is a ferry that crosses the river (fleuve St Laurent) to Saint-Siméon on the north shore.

The city is also served by the Rivière-du-Loup Airport (IATA airport code YRI). The town can also be reached by Via Rail on the train named The Ocean, between Montreal and Halifax.

== Media ==
=== Television ===
Rivière-du-Loup is an unusual television market, as each of its stations has two transmitters in the city. The city's hilly terrain causes residents of the lower, western portions of the city to experience frequent signal dropout. That makes it all but impossible for a television station to serve the entire area with a single transmitter. Accordingly, each station in the city has both a primary transmitter and a "nested" low-power rebroadcaster to serve viewers in the western part of the city who cannot receive the primary signal.

Until August 2021, the city was served by Canada's only triple-stick operation, in which all three of its licensed stations are owned by the same company, Télé Inter-Rives. This would be pared down to a twin-stick following the closedown of CKRT-DT in August 2021.

OTA virtual channel (PSIP)	OTA actual channel	Vidéotron Cable	Call sign	Network	Notes
9.1	9 (VHF)	4	CIMT-DT	TVA	Maintains low-power rebroadcaster on UHF channel 41
29.1	29 (UHF)	5	CFTF-DT	Noovo	Maintains low-power rebroadcaster on VHF channel 11

Defunct station:

OTA virtual channel (PSIP)	OTA actual channel	Vidéotron Cable	Call sign	Network	Notes
7.1	7 (VHF)	10	CKRT-DT	Ici Radio-Canada Télé	Maintained low-power rebroadcaster on VHF channel 13

Rivière-du-Loup is a mandatory market for digital television conversion; Télé Inter-Rives converted all of its transmitters to digital prior to the deadline of August 30, 2011.

Unlike most larger cities in Quebec, Rivière-du-Loup has no local Télé-Québec outlet, though Rimouski's CIVB-DT is available on the Vidéotron system in Rivière-du-Loup. Following the closedown of CKRT-DT, Radio-Canada would be seen on Vidéotron from CJBR-DT Rimouski.

=== Radio ===
- FM 89.5 - CJBR-FM-1, Ici Radio-Canada Première
- FM 90.7 - CBRX-FM-3, Ici Musique
- FM 103.7 - CIEL-FM, AC
- FM 107.1 - CIBM-FM, CHR
- FM 107.9 - CIBM-FM-1 (local CIBM rebroadcaster)
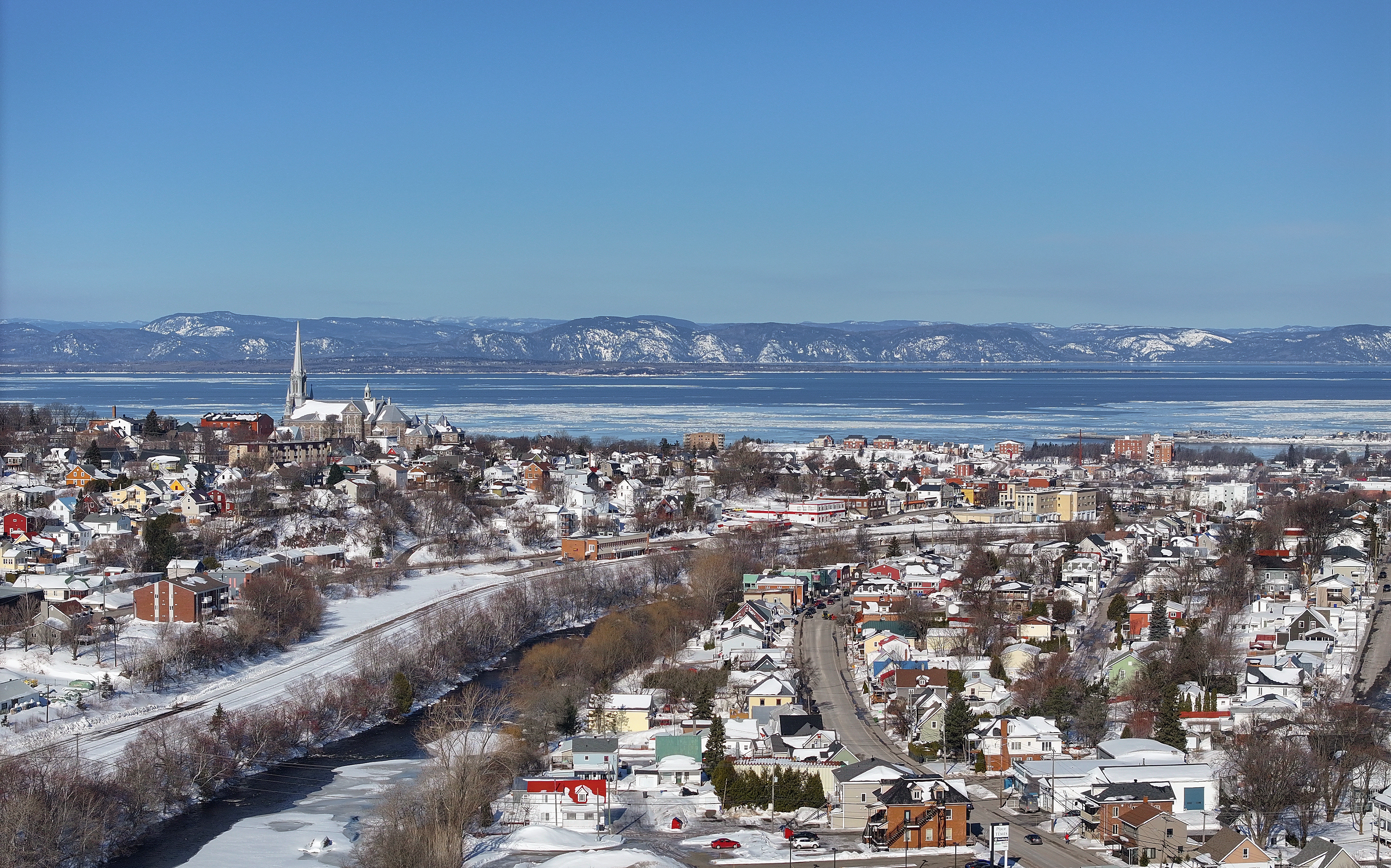
Panorama of Rivière-du-Loup's skyline

== Notable people ==
Sir John A. Macdonald, Canada's first prime minister, had a summer home in Rivière-du-Loup.

People born there include:

- Danielle April, artist
- Joseph Jean Benoit, 31st Canadian Surgeon General
- Leila Beaudoin, professional boxer
- Raymond Goulet, dancer and writer
- Nicolas Dickner, writer
- Dr. John McLoughlin, known as "the father of Oregon"
- Louis-Philippe Picard, member of the House of Commons of Canada
- Maurice Arthur Pope, soldier and diplomat
- Alex Belzile, professional hockey player
- Allan Sirois, professional hockey player
- Alexandre-Antonin Taché, first Archbishop of Saint Boniface

== See also ==
- List of cities in Quebec
- 1950 Rivière-du-Loup B-50 nuclear weapon loss incident where 100 pounds (45 kg) of radioactive uranium-238 was exploded. The radioactive material release was revealed in the 1980s.
