= Quebec Route 291 =

Highway in Quebec, Canada

Route 291

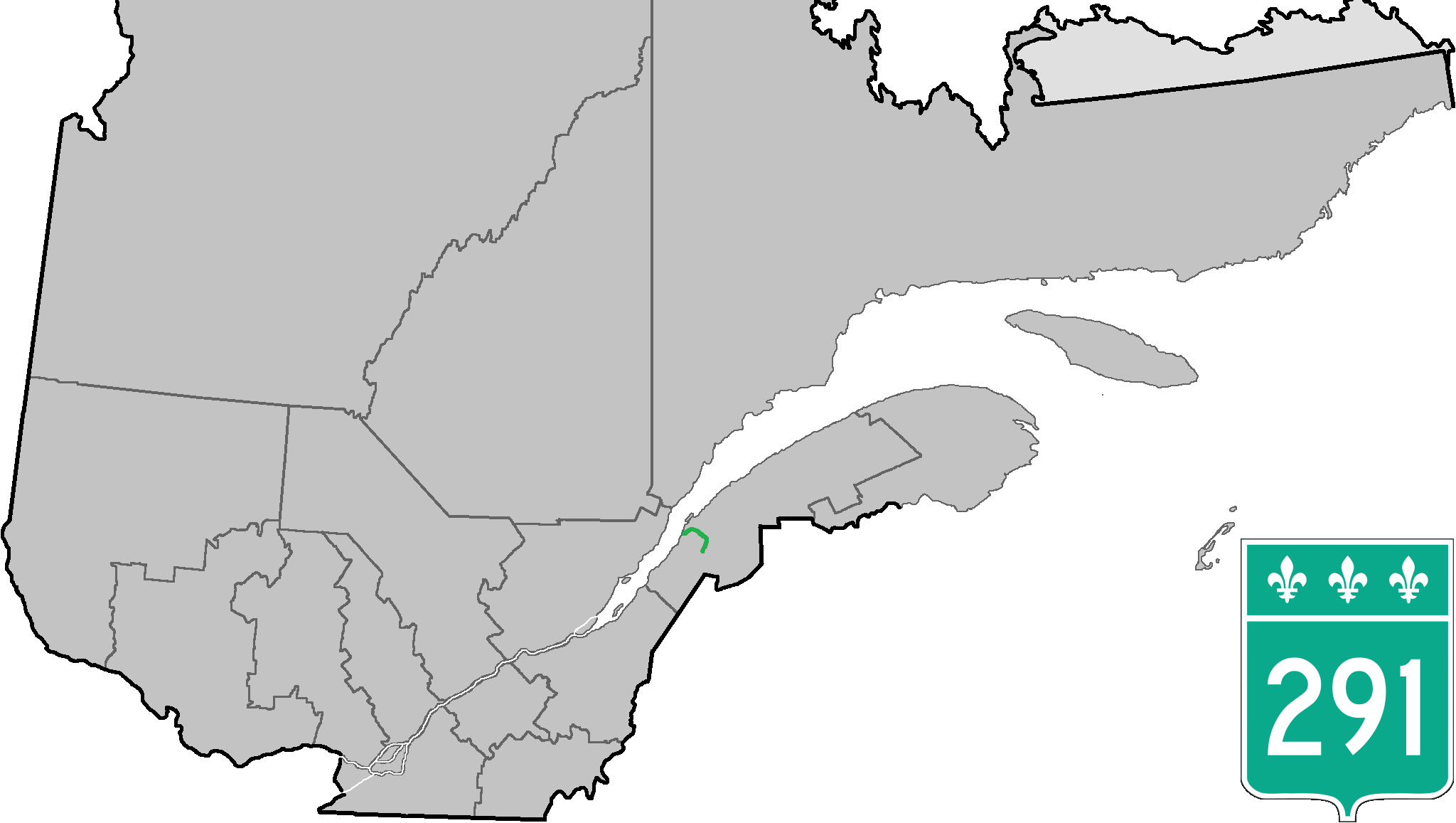

Route information
- Length: 55 km (34 mi)

Major junctions
- North end: rue Lafontaine in Rivière-du-Loup
- None
- South end: A-85 (TCH) in Saint-Honore-de-Temiscouata

Location
- Country: Canada
- Province: Quebec
- Major cities: Rivière-du-Loup

Highway system
- Quebec provincial highways; Autoroutes; List; Former
← R-289	→ R-293

Route 291 is 55 km two-lane north/south highway in Quebec, Canada, which starts in Rivière-du-Loup at the junction of rue Lafontaine and rue Beaubien in Downtown Rivière-du-Loup, and ends in Saint-Honoré-de-Témiscouata at the junction of Autoroute 85.

== Towns along Route 291 ==
- Rivière-du-Loup
- Saint-Arsène
- Saint-Épiphane
- Saint-François-Xavier-de-Viger
- Saint-Honoré-de-Témiscouata
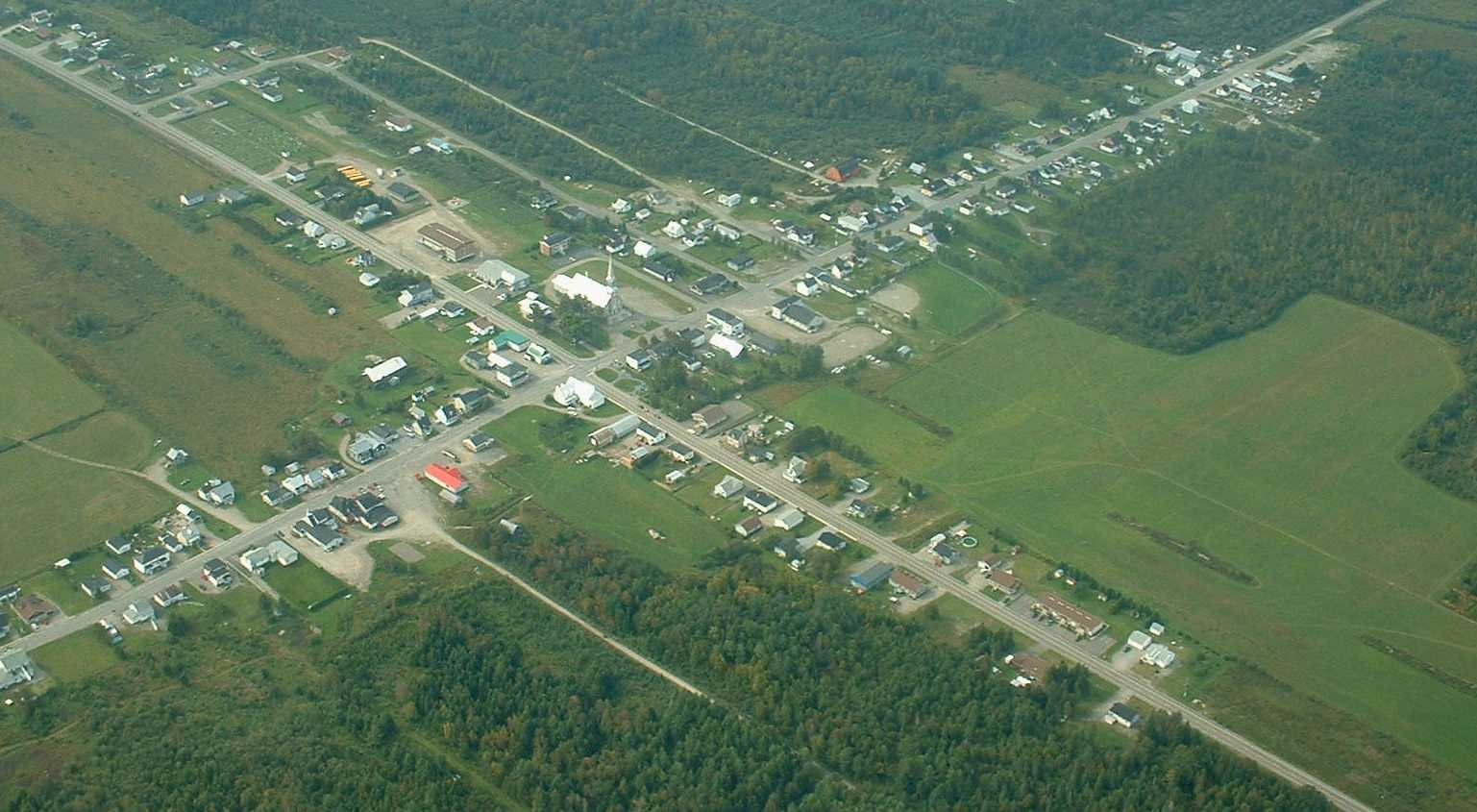
Route 291 crosses Saint-Honoré-de-Témiscouata.

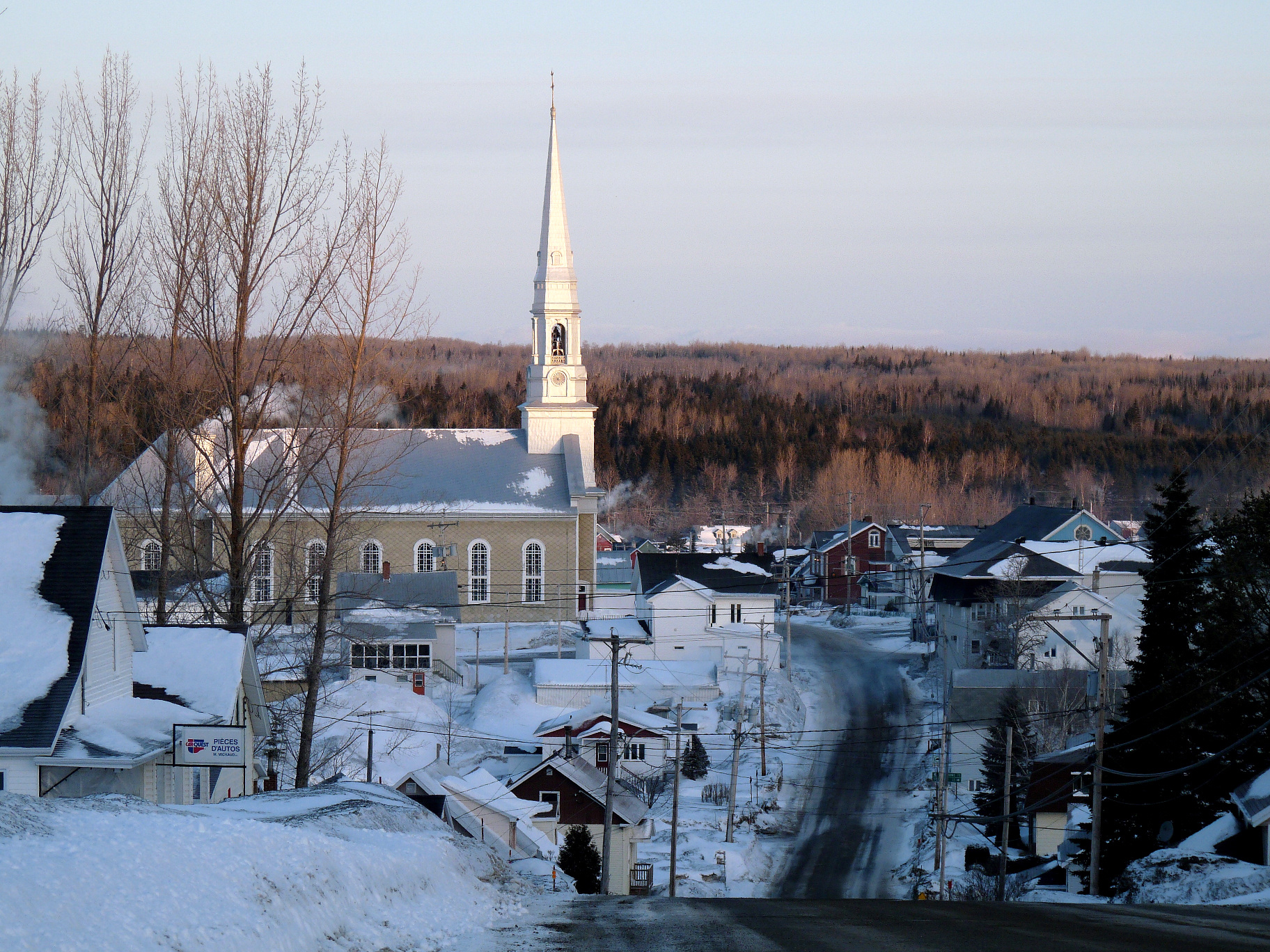
Principale street in Saint-Hubert-de-Rivière-du-Loup village.

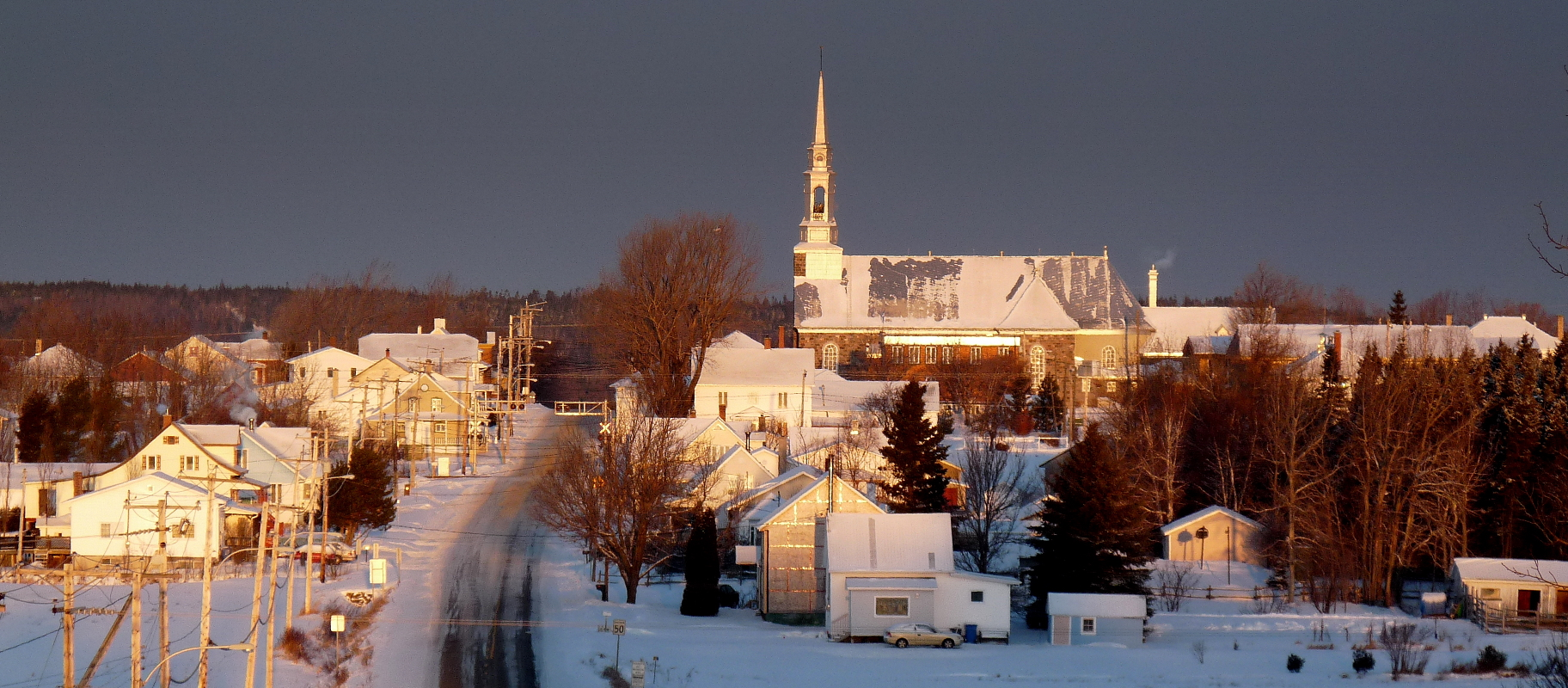
Église street in Saint-Arsène.

== See also ==
- List of Quebec provincial highways
