= Trois Pistoles River =

River in Quebec, Canada

Coordinates: 48°05′48″N 69°12′54″W

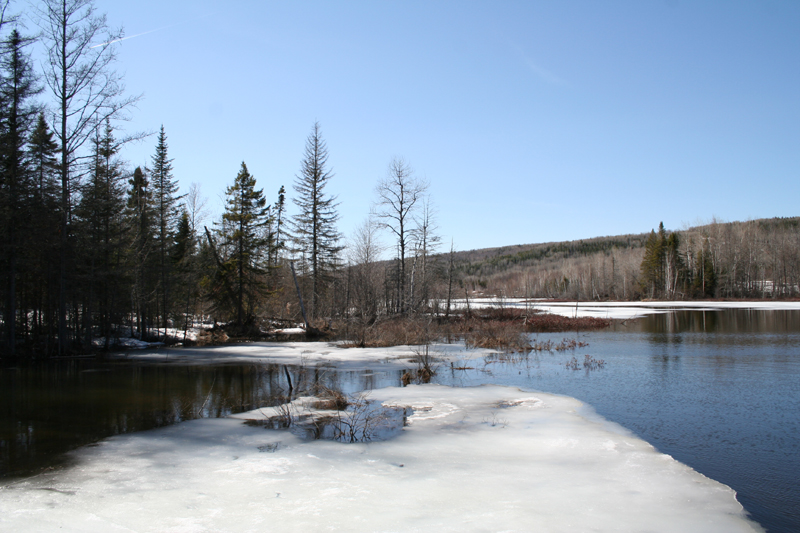

The Trois Pistoles River (French: rivière des Trois Pistoles，pronounced [ʁivjɛʁ de tʁwa pistɔl]) is a river in Quebec that discharges into the St. Lawrence River. It originates in Lac des Trois-Pistoles, flowing westward from Sainte-Rita in Les Basques Regional County Municipality to Saint-Cyprien in Rivière-du-Loup Regional County Municipality, then northwest into Les Basques again at Saint-Jean-de-Dieu and continuing through Saint-Clément, Saint-Éloi, Sainte-Françoise, and Notre-Dame-des-Neiges until reaching the south coast of the St. Lawrence River.

Samuel de Champlain recorded this river as "Rivière des Sauvages" or "Rivière de l'île Verte" in Voyages de la Nouvelle-France, published in 1632.

== See also ==
- List of rivers of Quebec
