= Trois-Pistoles (disambiguation) =

Trois-Pistoles is a city in Quebec, Canada.

Trois-Pistoles or Trois Pistoles may also refer to:

- Trois Pistoles River in Bas-Saint-Laurent, Quebec
- Trois Pistoles station, a train station in the Quebec city
- Trois Pistoles (ale), an ale brewed by Unibroue

== See also ==
- "Three Pistols", a 1991 song by The Tragically Hip
- Pistole
