= Saint-Cyprien, Bas-Saint-Laurent =

Saint-Cyprien
- Municipality
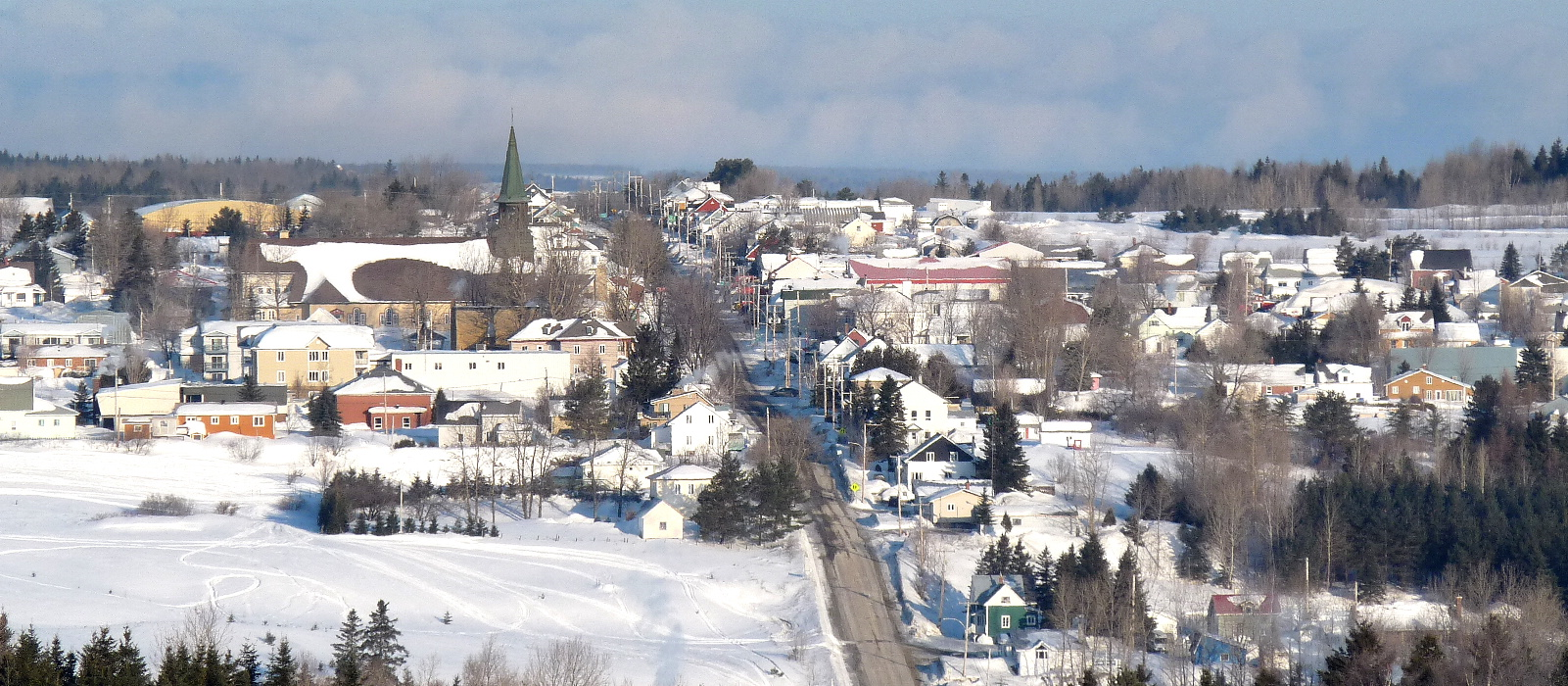
- Saint-Cyprien skyline

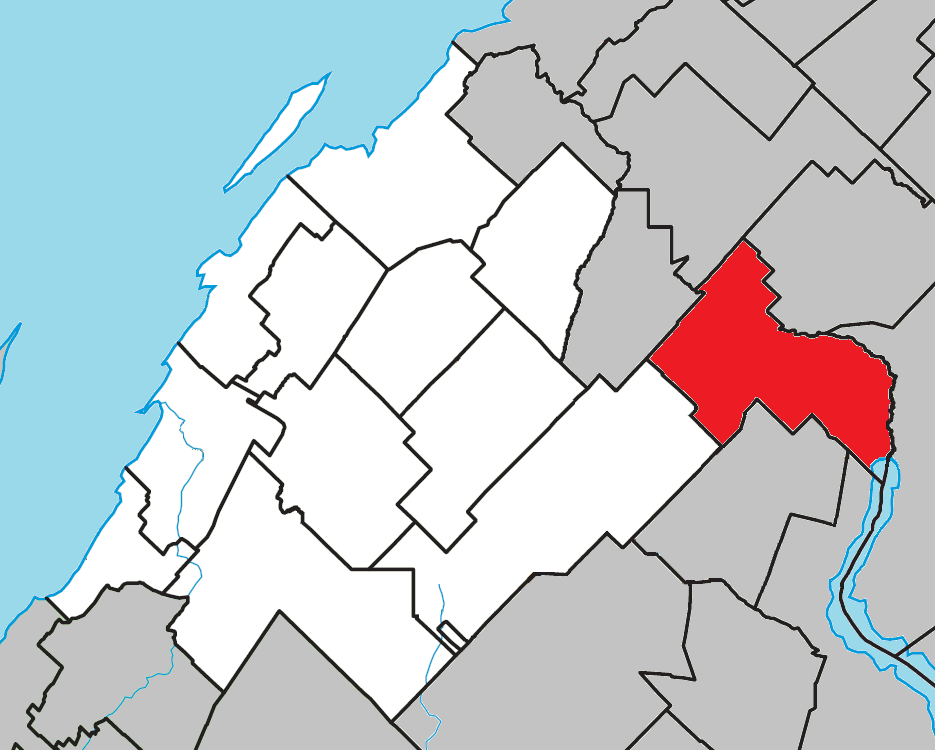
- Location within Rivière-du-Loup RCM

- Location in eastern Quebec
- Coordinates: 47°54′N 69°01′W
- Country: Canada
- Province: Quebec
- Region: Bas-Saint-Laurent
- RCM: Rivière-du-Loup
- Constituted: January 1, 1883

Government
  - Mayor: Michel Lagacé
  - Federal riding: Côte-du-Sud—Rivière-du-Loup—Kataskomiq—Témiscouata
  - Prov. riding: Rivière-du-Loup–Témiscouata–Les Basques

Area
  - Total: 140.00 km^{2} (54.05 sq mi)
  - Land: 138.43 km^{2} (53.45 sq mi)

Population (2021)
  - Total: 1,078
  - Density: 7.8/km^{2} (20/sq mi)
  - Pop 2016-2021: ▲1.1%
  - Dwellings: 502
- Time zone: UTC−5 (EST)
  - Summer (DST): UTC−4 (EDT)
- Postal code(s): G0L 2P0
- Area codes: 418 and 581
- Highways: R-232; R-293
- Website: www.municipalite.saint-cyprien.qc.ca

Saint-Cyprien (French pronunciation: [sɛ̃ sipʁijɛ̃]) is a municipality in Rivière-du-Loup Regional County Municipality in the Bas-Saint-Laurent region of Quebec, Canada.

== History ==
It was from 1862 that the first settlers began to develop this territory; Most of them came from parishes on the southern coast of the Saint Lawrence (Trois-Pistoles, Saint-Éloi, L'Isle-Verte). The municipality was officially created in 1883 under the name of Hocquart by splitting away from the municipality of Saint-Éloi. Two years later, a large section of Hocquart was taken away to create the municipality of Saint-Clément.

The municipality lost its church in January 1954 in a fire which originated in the furnace system. Two years later, the new church built by corvée came into operation. Five years later, in 1959, Hocquart changed its name to become the current municipality of Saint-Cyprien.

== Geography ==
Saint-Cyprien is part of the Bas-Saint-Laurent region in Quebec and located at the southeastern limit of the Rivière-du-Loup RCM.

== Demographics ==
=== Population ===
Canada census – Saint-Cyprien community profile

	2021	2016	2011
Population	1,078 (+1.1% from 2016)	1,066 (-8.3% from 2011)	1,163 (-7.8% from 2006)
Land area	138.43 km^{2} (53.45 sq mi)	138.16 km^{2} (53.34 sq mi)	138.13 km^{2} (53.33 sq mi)
Population density	7.8/km^{2} (20/sq mi)	7.7/km^{2} (20/sq mi)	8.4/km^{2} (22/sq mi)
Median age	47.2 (M: 48.8, F: 46.0)	49.2 (M: 48.4, F: 50.0)	46.0 (M: 45.2, F: 46.8)
Private dwellings	502 (total) 448 (occupied)	479 (total) 425 (occupied)	462 (total)
Median household income	$64,500	$55,616	$54,051

References: 2021 2016 2011

Historical Census Data - Saint-Cyprien, Quebec

Year	Pop.	±%
1891	575	—
1901	607	+5.6%
1911	964	+58.8%
1921	1,167	+21.1%
1931	1,302	+11.6%
1941	1,156	−11.2%
1951	1,454	+25.8%

Year	Pop.	±%
1956	1,372	−5.6%
1961	1,365	−0.5%
1966	1,325	−2.9%
1971	1,284	−3.1%
1976	1,269	−1.2%
1981	1,298	+2.3%
1986	1,270	−2.2%

Year	Pop.	±%
1991	1,238	−2.5%
1996	1,274	+2.9%
2001	1,231	−3.4%
2006	1,262	+2.5%
2011	1,163	−7.8%
2016	1,066	−8.3%
2021	1,078	+1.1%

Source: Statistics Canada

== See also ==
- List of municipalities in Quebec
