= Notre-Dame-des-Neiges =

- Municipality
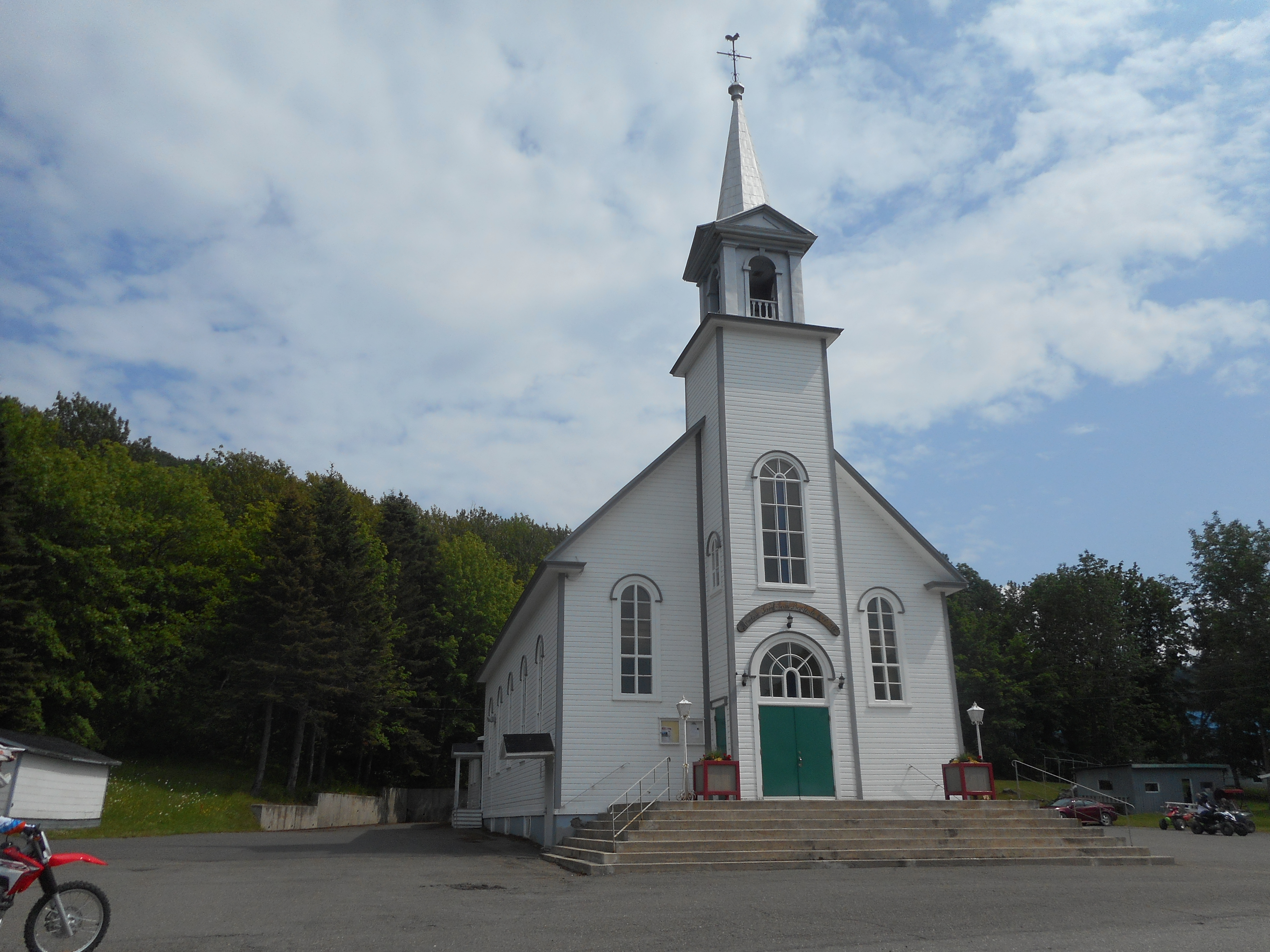
- Saint-Jean-Baptiste Church

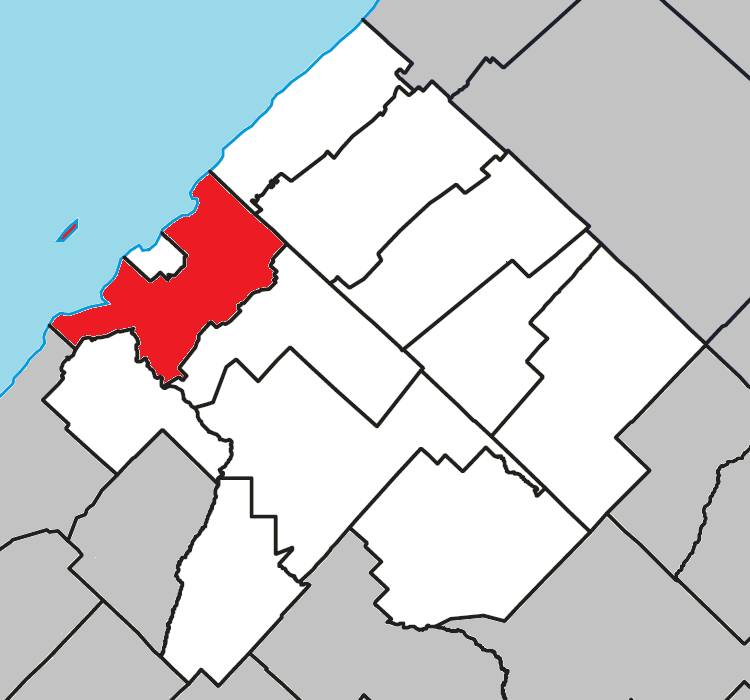
- Location within Les Basques RCM

- Location in eastern Quebec
- Coordinates: 48.0978°N 69.2117°W
- Country: Canada
- Province: Quebec
- Region: Bas-Saint-Laurent
- RCM: Les Basques
- Constituted: July 1, 1855

Government
  - Mayor: Charles Lavoie
  - Federal riding: Rimouski-Neigette—Mitis—Matapédia—Les Basques
  - Prov. riding: Rivière-du-Loup–Témiscouata–Les Basques

Area
  - Total: 93.50 km^{2} (36.10 sq mi)
  - Land: 94.44 km^{2} (36.46 sq mi)
- There is an apparent contradiction between two authoritative sources

Population (2021)
  - Total: 1,194
  - Density: 12.6/km^{2} (33/sq mi)
  - Pop 2016-2021: ▲10%
  - Dwellings: 815
- Time zone: UTC−5 (EST)
  - Summer (DST): UTC−4 (EDT)
- Postal code(s): G0L 4K0 (Rural); G0L 2E0 (Village)
- Area codes: 418 and 581
- Highways: A-20 R-132 R-293
- Website: www.notredame desneiges.qc.ca

Notre-Dame-des-Neiges (French pronunciation: [nɔtʁə dam de nɛʒ]) is a municipality in Quebec, Canada. It encircles the city of Trois-Pistoles and includes the offshore Île aux Basques.

== History ==
Before the creation of the municipality, the whole area was known as Trois-Pistoles. In 1827, the christian parish of Notre-Dame-des-Neiges-des-Trois-Pistoles was canonically established. Eventually, in 1855, the municipality was officially established under the name of ‘Trois-Pistoles’. At the time, the territory of the municipality included nearly half of the current Les Basques RCM.

Over time, Trois-Pistoles lost two important section that became separate municipality. First with the séparation of Bégon in 1865, then again in 1873 with the séparation of Saint-Françoise.

On 29 August 1906, the chirstian mission of La Nativité-de-Saint-Jean-Baptiste was canonically established. It was placed under the patronage of Saint John the Baptist in honour of the Jesuit priest Jean-Baptiste de La Brosse, a former missionary of the parish of Trois-Pistoles. In 1907, a chapel was built. Parish registers have been kept there since 3 October 1908. In 1908, it welcomed its first parish priest, J.-A. Beaulieu. Previously, it had been served by the parish priest of Trois-Pistoles. On 20 May 1911, a parish council was established.

In 1916, the town of Trois-Pistoles was established, by separating the urban section of Trois-Pistoles from the rest of the municipality. Later, the now mostly rural municipality changed its name to Notre-Dame-des-Neiges-des-Trois-Pistoles.

In 1997, Notre-Dame-des-Neiges-des-Trois-Pistoles changed its name to simply, ‘Notre-Dame-des-Neiges’ and changed its status from a parish municipality to a regular municipality.

== Geography ==
Notre-Dame-des-Neiges is located on the southern shore of the St. Lawrence River, 250 km (160 mi) northeast of Quebec City. Important towns near Notre-Dame-des-Neiges are Rivière-du-Loup 45 km to the south-west and Rimouski 60 km to the northeast. Notre-Dame-des-Neiges is located on Route 293 which connects Trois-Pistoles to Route 232 between Trois-Pistoles to the northwest and Saint-Jean-de-Dieu to the southeast. The territory of Notre-Dame-des-Neiges covers an area of 94.44 km2.

The territory of the municipality of Notre-Dame-des-Neiges partially overlooks the St. Lawrence River and almost completely enclaves the city of Trois-Pistoles. It is part of the regional county municipality of Les Basques in the administrative region of Bas-Saint-Laurent and is crossed by the Trois Pistoles river.

== Demographics ==
=== Population ===
Canada census – Notre-Dame-des-Neiges community profile

	2021	2016	2011
Population	1,194 (10.0% from 2016)	1,085 (-3.9% from 2011)	1,129 (-6.6% from 2006)
Land area	94.44 km^{2} (36.46 sq mi)	94.21 km^{2} (36.37 sq mi)	94.22 km^{2} (36.38 sq mi)
Population density	12.6/km^{2} (33/sq mi)	11.5/km^{2} (30/sq mi)	12.0/km^{2} (31/sq mi)
Median age	57.2 (M: 57.2, F: 58.0)	56.9 (M: 56.9, F: 56.9)	53.4 (M: 53.5, F: 53.3)
Private dwellings	815 (total)	778 (total)	789 (total)
Median household income	$62,000	$54,848	$51,684

References: 2021 2016 2011

Historical Census Data - Notre-Dame-des-Neiges, Quebec
Year	Pop.	±%
1861	3,451	—
1871	3,967	+15.0%
1881	2,872	−27.6%
1891	2,495	−13.1%
1901	2,595	+4.0%
1911	3,076	+18.5%
1921	1,801	−41.4%
1931	1,645	−8.7%
1941	1,611	−2.1%
1951	1,659	+3.0%
1956	1,641	−1.1%
1961	1,702	+3.7%
1966	1,363	−19.9%
1971	1,206	−11.5%
1976	1,140	−5.5%
1981	1,206	+5.8%
1986	1,233	+2.2%
1991	1,177	−4.5%
1996	1,318	+12.0%
2001	1,294	−1.8%
2006	1,209	−6.6%
2011	1,129	−6.6%
2016	1,085	−3.9%
2021	1,194	+10.0%

=== Language ===
Canada Census Mother Tongue - Notre-Dame-des-Neiges, Quebec
Census	Total	French			English			French & English			Other		
Year	Responses	Count	Trend	Pop %	Count	Trend	Pop %	Count	Trend	Pop %	Count	Trend	Pop %
2021	1,195	1,180	▲9.3%	98.7%	5	0.0%	0.4%	5	▲ n/a%	0.4%	0	0.0%	0.0%
2016	1,085	1,080	▼4.0%	99.5%	5	0.0%	0.5%	0	0.0%	0.0%	0	0.0%	0.0%
2011	1,130	1,125	▼5.1%	99.6%	5	▼50.0%	0.4%	0	0.0%	0.0%	0	▼100.0%	0.0%
2006	1,205	1,185	▼8.5%	98.3%	10	▲ n/a%	0.8%	0	0.0%	0.0%	10	▲ n/a%	0.8%
2001	1,295	1,295	▼1.1%	100.0%	0	▼100.0%	0.0%	0	0.0%	0.0%	0	0.0%	0.0%
1996	1,320	1,310	n/a	99.2%	10	n/a	0.8%	0	n/a	0.0%	0	n/a	0.0%

== See also ==
- List of municipalities in Quebec
