= Saint-Michel-du-Squatec =

- Municipality
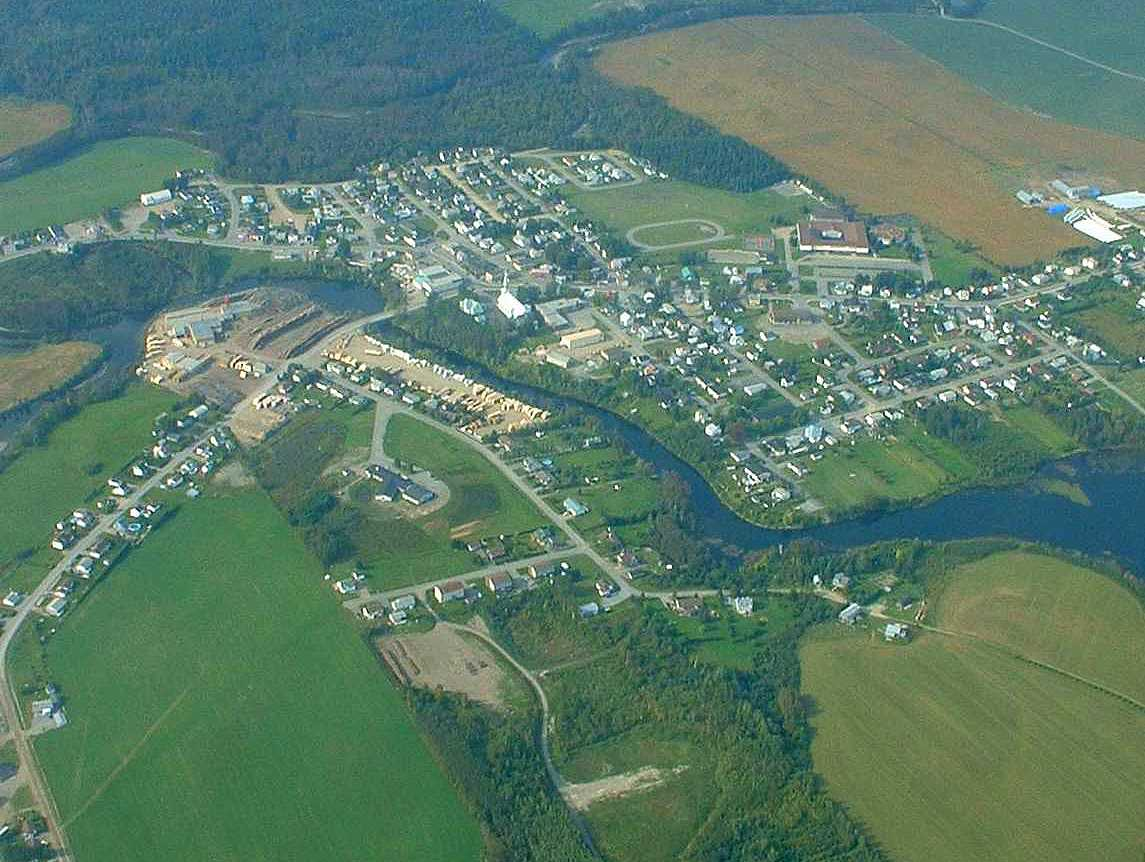

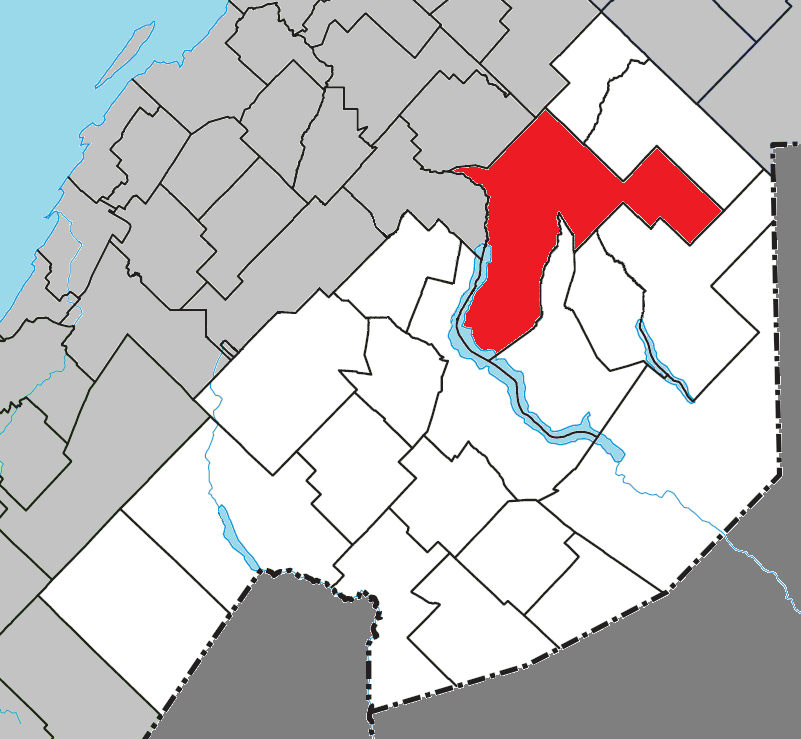
- Location within Témiscouata RCM

- Location in eastern Quebec
- Coordinates: 47.88°N 68.72°W
- Country: Canada
- Province: Quebec
- Region: Bas-Saint-Laurent
- RCM: Témiscouata
- Constituted: April 16, 1928

Government
  - Mayor: Raynald Morin
  - Federal riding: Côte-du-Sud—Rivière-du-Loup—Kataskomiq—Témiscouata
  - Prov. riding: Rivière-du-Loup–Témiscouata–Les Basques

Area
  - Total: 385.40 km^{2} (148.80 sq mi)
  - Land: 361.23 km^{2} (139.47 sq mi)

Population (2021)
  - Total: 1,076
  - Density: 3/km^{2} (7.8/sq mi)
  - Pop 2016-2021: ▼3.3%
  - Dwellings: 576
- Time zone: UTC−5 (EST)
  - Summer (DST): UTC−4 (EDT)
- Postal code(s): G0L 4H0
- Area codes: 418 and 581
- Highways: R-232; R-295; R-296
- Website: www.squatec.qc.ca

Saint-Michel-du-Squatec (French pronunciation: [sɛ̃ miʃɛl dy skwatɛk]) is a municipality in the Canadian province of Quebec, located in the Témiscouata Regional County Municipality in the Bas-Saint-Laurent region. Population is 1,076 as of 2021. The patronage of Saint Michel is said to owe something to one of the pioneers so named. As for the word Squatec, some sources suggest that it is a modification of the form esqoateg, of Mi'kmaq or Wolastoqiyik origin, meaning the source of a river.

The first settlers arrived in the area before 1893. The municipality was created in 1928. On November 1, 2014, Saint-Michel-du-Squatec changed from parish municipality to a (regular) municipality.

== See also ==
- Touladi River
