= Île aux Basques =

Island in Canada

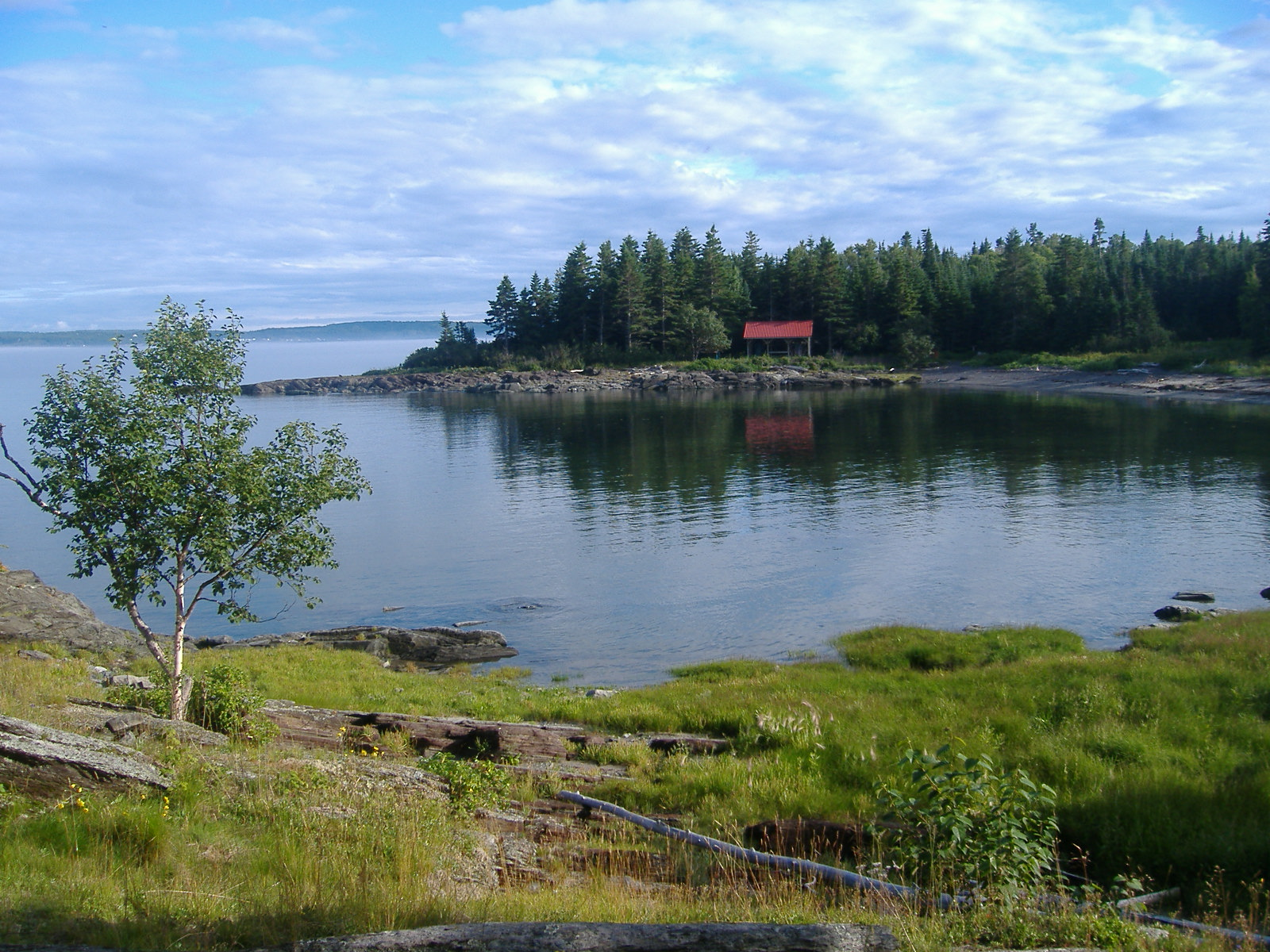
- Interactive map of Île aux Basques

Geography
- Location: Saint Lawrence River
- Coordinates: 48°8′34″N 69°14′58″W
- Area: 0.55 km^{2} (0.21 sq mi)
- Length: 2 km (1.2 mi)
- Width: 0.4 km (0.25 mi)

Administration
- Canada
- Province: Quebec
- Region: Bas-Saint-Laurent
- Regional County Municipality: Les Basques
- Municipality: Notre-Dame-des-Neiges

Île aux Basques is a Canadian island located in the lower estuary of the St. Lawrence River, about 5 kilometres (3.1 mi) north of Trois-Pistoles, in Les Basques Regional County Municipality of the Bas-Saint-Laurent region of Quebec. The island is part of the municipality of Notre-Dame-des-Neiges.

It is, since its acquisition by Société Provancher in 1929, a protected area as a sanctuary for migratory birds. From 1584 until about 1637 it was occupied several times by the Basques, after whom the island takes its name. Both the lack of space in the Basque Country and the abundance of whales in the St. Lawrence River led to the arrival of the Basque fishermen to the island. The Basque Country was divided between the Crown of France and the Crown of Spain since the 1512 Spanish invasion of the Kingdom of Navarre.

A series of wars and invasions led seafarers to explore further inland from the Atlantic Ocean for seals, porpoises and whales. The Basques also practiced trade with the Iroquois and Algonquins, one of the first places where the legacy of these two cultures can be seen. These facts were confirmed by archaeological excavations in the 1990s at various locations on the island.

The island is home to Basque and Indigenous sites, four of which are situated along its southern shore. These four sites, or shore camps, resemble similar sites scattered along the shores of the Gulf of St. Lawrence. Shore camps not only gave fishermen and whalers a chance to replenish their supplies of firewood and fresh water, but they also provided space to dry their catch of fish. Whalers also used shore camps to process whales and render the blubber into oil. Four single-hearth Basque ovens used in this process have been discovered on the island; two of these ovens were found at l'Anse à la Baleine, the third and fourth at l'Anse Qui Pue and l'Anse d'En Bas, respectively. In the oven at la Baleine, archaeologists discovered evidence of charred blubber and combustion, as well as pieces of terra cotta roof tiles and fragments of European crockery. In addition, archaeologists found two glass beads alongside the Basque artifacts at la Baleine; one turquoise-colored and the other white, both matched descriptions of types of beads known to be traded by Europeans to Indigenous peoples. Indigenous pottery shards and other Basque items have also been found at the other archaeological sites spread out along the southern shore, confirming that the Basques and Indigenous peoples frequented these sites at the same time.

The last known documentation of Basque presence on the island was made by Jesuit Paul Lejeune in 1637. Although the exact time the Basques stopped frequenting the island is unknown, the 1664 writings of another Jesuit, Father Henri Nouvel, confirm that the Basque occupation of the island bearing their name was by that time a thing of the past. He observed, "It [the island] goes by the name of the Isle aux Basques, on account of the whaling which the Basques did there in bygone days. I took pleasure in visiting the large ovens they had built to make their oil, about which we can still see the great ribs of Whales they killed."

The island is 2 kilometres (1.2 mi) long and 400 metres (1,300 ft) wide, covering an area of 0.55 square kilometres (0.21 mi^{2}). Its highest point has an elevation of 50 metres (160 ft) in the center of the island. It is located in the physiographic region of the Appalachia, on the south bank of the St. Lawrence opposite the city of Trois-Pistoles, about 250 kilometres (160 mi) east of Quebec City.

Île aux Basques was designated as a National Historic Site of Canada.
