= Les Basques Regional County Municipality =

Les Basques
- Regional county municipality
- Coordinates: 48°06′N 69°04′W
- Country: Canada
- Province: Quebec
- Region: Bas-Saint-Laurent
- Effective: April 1, 1981
- County seat: Trois-Pistoles

Government
  - Type: Prefecture
  - Prefect: Gabriel Belzile

Area
  - Total: 1,130.70 km^{2} (436.57 sq mi)
  - Land: 1,121.82 km^{2} (433.14 sq mi)

Population (2016)
  - Total: 8,694
  - Density: 7.7/km^{2} (20/sq mi)
  - Change 2011-2016: ▼4.9%
  - Dwellings: 5,185
- Time zone: UTC−05:00 (EST)
  - Summer (DST): UTC−04:00 (EDT)
- Area codes: 418 and 581
- Website: www.mrcdesbasques.com

Les Basques (French pronunciation: [le bask], the Basques) is a regional county municipality in the Bas-Saint-Laurent region in eastern Quebec, Canada. It is located on the south bank of the Saint Lawrence River halfway between Rimouski and Rivière-du-Loup.

The county seat is in Trois-Pistoles.

== Subdivisions ==
There are 11 subdivisions within the RCM:

Cities & towns (1)

- Trois-Pistoles

Municipalities (7)

- Notre-Dame-des-Neiges
- Saint-Clément
- Sainte-Rita
- Saint-Jean-de-Dieu
- Saint-Mathieu-de-Rioux
- Saint-Médard
- Saint-Simon-de-Rimouski

Parishes (2)

- Sainte-Françoise
- Saint-Éloi

Unorganized territory (1)

- Lac-Boisbouscache

== Demographics ==
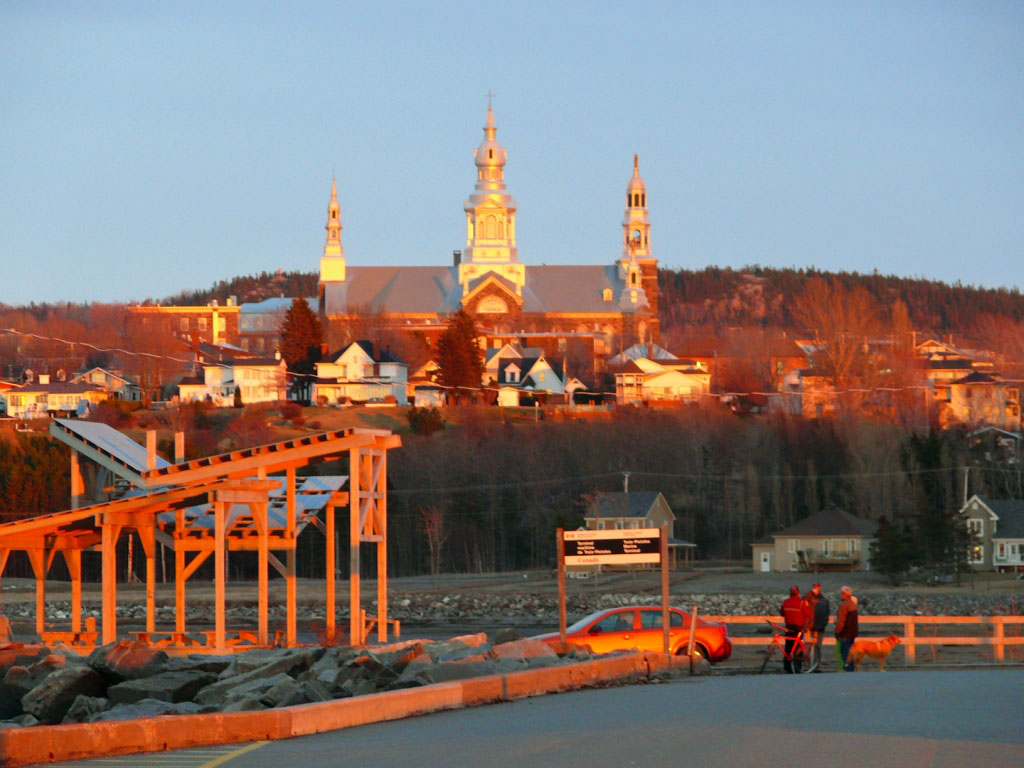
Trois-Pistoles

=== Population ===
Canada census – Les Basques community profile

	2021	2016	2011
Population	8,873 (+2.1% from 2016)	8,694 (-4.9% from 2011)	9,142 (-3.5% from 2006)
Land area	1,120.03 km^{2} (432.45 sq mi)	1,121.82 km^{2} (433.14 sq mi)	1,122.76 km^{2} (433.50 sq mi)
Population density	7.9/km^{2} (20/sq mi)	7.7/km^{2} (20/sq mi)	8.1/km^{2} (21/sq mi)
Median age	56.8 (M: 56.0, F: 57.6)	55.6 (M: 55.1, F: 56.1)	52.6 (M: 51.7, F: 53.5)
Private dwellings	5,182 (total) 4,244 (occupied)	5,185 (total)	5,144 (total)
Median household income	$53,600	$44,809	$42,510

References: 2021 2016 2011

Historical census data - Les Basques Regional County Municipality, Quebec

Year	Pop.	±%
1991	10,325	—
1996	10,204	−1.2%
2001	9,848	−3.5%

Year	Pop.	±%
2006	9,475	−3.8%
2011	9,142	−3.5%
2016	8,694	−4.9%

=== Language ===
Canada Census mother tongue - Les Basques Regional County Municipality, Quebec
Census	Total	French			English			French & English			Other		
Year	Responses	Count	Trend	Pop %	Count	Trend	Pop %	Count	Trend	Pop %	Count	Trend	Pop %
2016	8,580	8,530	▼5.0%	99.42%	30	▼40.0%	0.35%	10	▼50.0%	0.12%	10	▲100%	0.12%
2011	9,055	8,980	▲0.1%	99.17%	50	▲233.3%	0.55%	20	▲ n/a%	0.22%	5	▼96.4%	0.06%
2006	9,125	8,970	▼6.0%	98.30%	15	▼40.0%	0.17%	0	0.0%	0.00%	140	▲1300.0%	1.53%
2001	9,580	9,545	▼2.7%	99.64%	25	▼73.7%	0.26%	0	▼100.0%	0.00%	10	▲ n/a%	0.10%
1996	9,920	9,805	n/a	98.84%	95	n/a	0.96%	20	n/a	0.20%	0	n/a	0.00%

== Transportation ==
=== Access routes ===
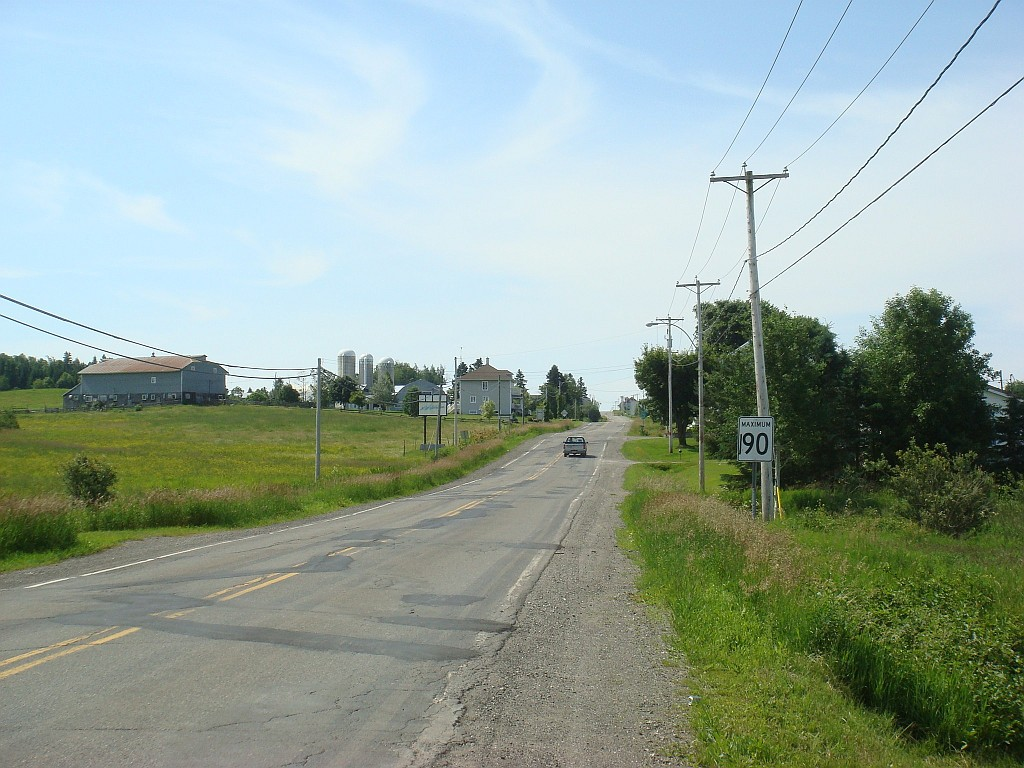
Quebec Route 293 in Saint-Jean-de-Dieu

Highways and numbered routes that run through the municipality, including external routes that start or finish at the county border:

- Autoroutes
  - A-20
- Principal highways
  - R-132
- Secondary highways
  - R-293
  - R-295
  - R-296
- External routes
  - None

== See also ==
- List of regional county municipalities and equivalent territories in Quebec
