= Lac-Boisbouscache =

- Unorganized territory
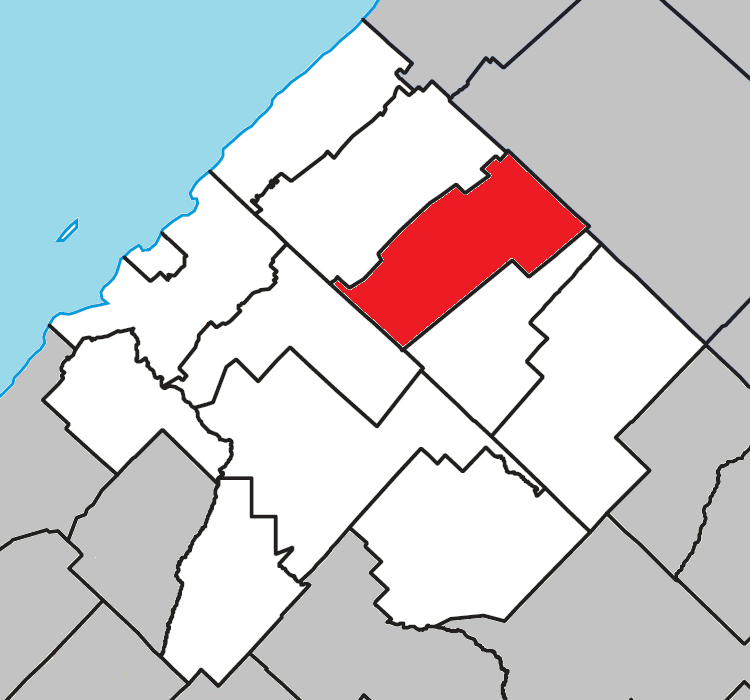
- Location within Les Basques RCM

- Location in eastern Quebec
- Coordinates: 48°08′N 68°50′W
- Country: Canada
- Province: Quebec
- Region: Bas-Saint-Laurent
- RCM: Les Basques

Government
  - Federal riding: Rimouski-Neigette—Mitis—Matapédia—Les Basques
  - Prov. riding: Rivière-du-Loup–Témiscouata–Les Basques

Area
  - Total: 101.80 km^{2} (39.31 sq mi)
  - Land: 99.39 km^{2} (38.37 sq mi)

Population (2011)
  - Total: 0
  - Density: 0/km^{2} (0/sq mi)
  - Pop 2006-2011: 0.0%
  - Dwellings: 17
- Time zone: UTC−5 (EST)
  - Summer (DST): UTC−4 (EDT)
- Highways: No major routes

Lac-Boisbouscache (French pronunciation: [lak bwabuskaʃ]) is an unorganized territory in the Canadian province of Quebec, located in the Les Basques Regional County Municipality.

== Demographics ==
=== Population ===
Historical Census Data - Lac-Boisbouscache, Quebec
Year	Pop.	±%
1991	0	—
1996	0	0.00%
2001	0	0.00%
2006	0	0.00%
2011	0	0.00%

== See also ==
- List of unorganized territories in Quebec
