= Saint-Clément, Quebec =

Saint-Clément
- Municipality
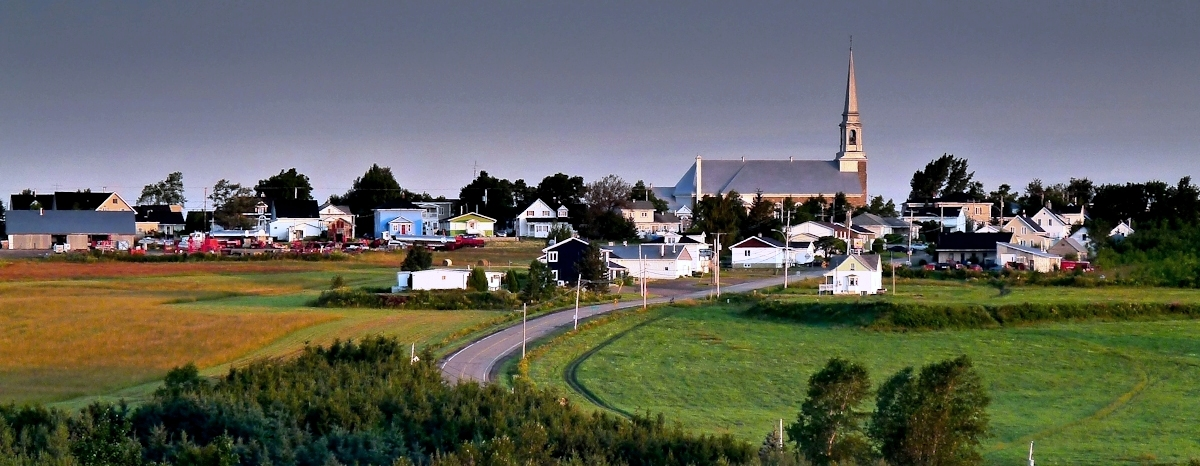

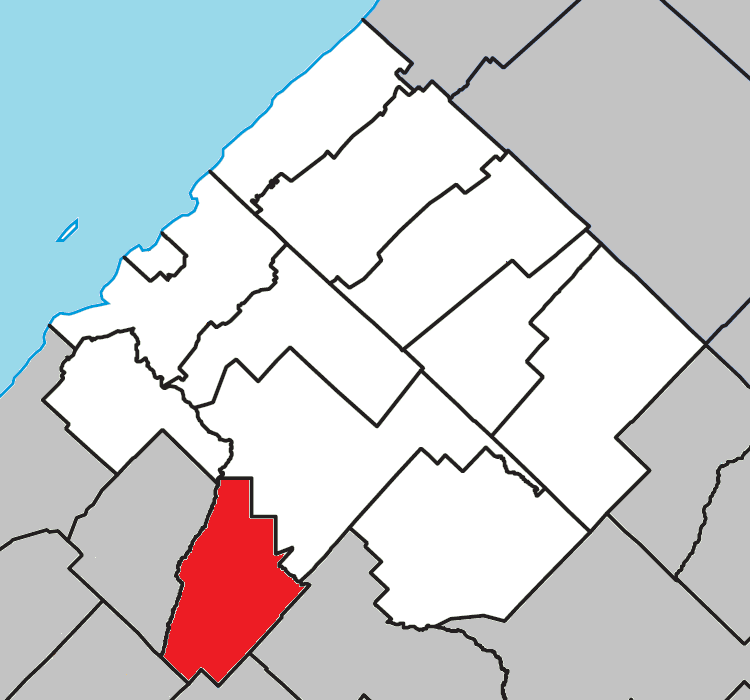
- Location within Les Basques RCM

- Location in eastern Quebec
- Coordinates: 47.92°N 69.1°W
- Country: Canada
- Province: Quebec
- Region: Bas-Saint-Laurent
- RCM: Les Basques
- Constituted: 1 January 1885

Government
  - Mayor: Manon-Josée D'Auteuil
  - Federal riding: Rimouski-Neigette—Mitis—Matapédia—Les Basques
  - Prov. riding: Rivière-du-Loup–Témiscouata–Les Basques

Area
  - Total: 79.90 km^{2} (30.85 sq mi)
  - Land: 86.72 km^{2} (33.48 sq mi)
- There is an apparent contradiction between two authoritative sources

Population (2021)
  - Total: 479
  - Density: 5.5/km^{2} (14/sq mi)
  - Pop 2016-2021: ▲4.1%
  - Dwellings: 231
- Time zone: UTC−5 (EST)
  - Summer (DST): UTC−4 (EDT)
- Postal code(s): G0L 2N0
- Area codes: 418 and 581
- Highways: R-293
- Website: www.st-clement.ca

Saint-Clément (French pronunciation: [sɛ̃ klemɑ̃]) is a municipality in the Canadian province of Quebec, located in Les Basques Regional County Municipality in the Bas-Saint-Laurent region.

== Geography ==
The territory of Saint-Clément is crossed by several rivers, including several rapids. The Trois Pistoles River forms the south-eastern boundary of the municipality, then flows north-west through it. The Mariakèche River crosses the south-west and then delimits the north-east of the municipality up to its confluence with the Trois Pistoles River. The Rivière Sénescoupé crosses the south of the municipality and flows northeast to its confluence with the Trois Pistoles River in the centre-east.

== Demographics ==
=== Population ===
Canada census – Saint-Clément community profile

	2021	2016	2011
Population	479 (+4.1% from 2016)	460 (-7.8% from 2011)	499 (-4.2% from 2006)
Land area	86.72 km^{2} (33.48 sq mi)	86.84 km^{2} (33.53 sq mi)	87.98 km^{2} (33.97 sq mi)
Population density	5.5/km^{2} (14/sq mi)	5.3/km^{2} (14/sq mi)	5.7/km^{2} (15/sq mi)
Median age	45.6 (M: 46, F: 44)	44.5 (M: 45.3, F: 43.0)	43.4 (M: 44.5, F: 42.4)
Private dwellings	215 (total)	231 (total)	235 (total)
Median household income	$56,800	$50,560	$43,675

References: 2021 2016 2011

Historical Census Data - Saint-Clément, Quebec
Year	Pop.	±%
1891	833	—
1901	1,024	+22.9%
1911	1,208	+18.0%
1921	1,234	+2.2%
1931	1,204	−2.4%
1941	1,219	+1.2%
1951	1,217	−0.2%
1956	1,259	+3.5%
1961	1,213	−3.7%
1966	1,018	−16.1%
1971	846	−16.9%
1976	711	−16.0%
1981	657	−7.6%
1986	623	−5.2%
1991	580	−6.9%
1996	566	−2.4%
2001	531	−6.2%
2006	521	−1.9%
2011	499	−4.2%
2016	460	−7.8%
2021	479	+4.1%

=== Language ===
Canada Census Mother Tongue - Saint-Clément, Quebec
Census	Total	French			English			French & English			Other		
Year	Responses	Count	Trend	Pop %	Count	Trend	Pop %	Count	Trend	Pop %	Count	Trend	Pop %
2021	475	465	▲2.2%	97.9%	5	▲ n/a%	1.1%	10	▲100.0%	2.1%	0	0.0%	0.0%
2016	460	455	▼8.1%	98.9%	0	▼100.0%	0.0%	5	▲ n/a%	1.1%	0	0.0%	0.0%
2011	500	495	▼3.9%	99.0%	5	▲ n/a%	1.0%	0	0.0%	0.0%	0	0.0%	0.0%
2006	515	515	▼1.9%	100.0%	0	0.0%	0.0%	0	0.0%	0.0%	0	0.0%	0.0%
2001	525	525	▼12.5%	100.0%	0	0.0%	0.0%	0	0.0%	0.0%	0	0.0%	0.0%
1996	600	600	n/a	100.0%	0	n/a	0.0%	0	n/a	0.0%	0	n/a	0.0%

== Attractions ==
The Sénéscoupé Trail is a linear walking trail that forms part of the Quebec National Trail. Approximately 17 kilometres long, this trail runs alongside the Trois-Pistoles and Sénescoupé rivers. Suitable for beginners to intermediate walkers, the trail offers visitors the chance to discover natural features such as steep cliffs, waterfalls and potholes.
