= Sainte-Rita =

- Municipality
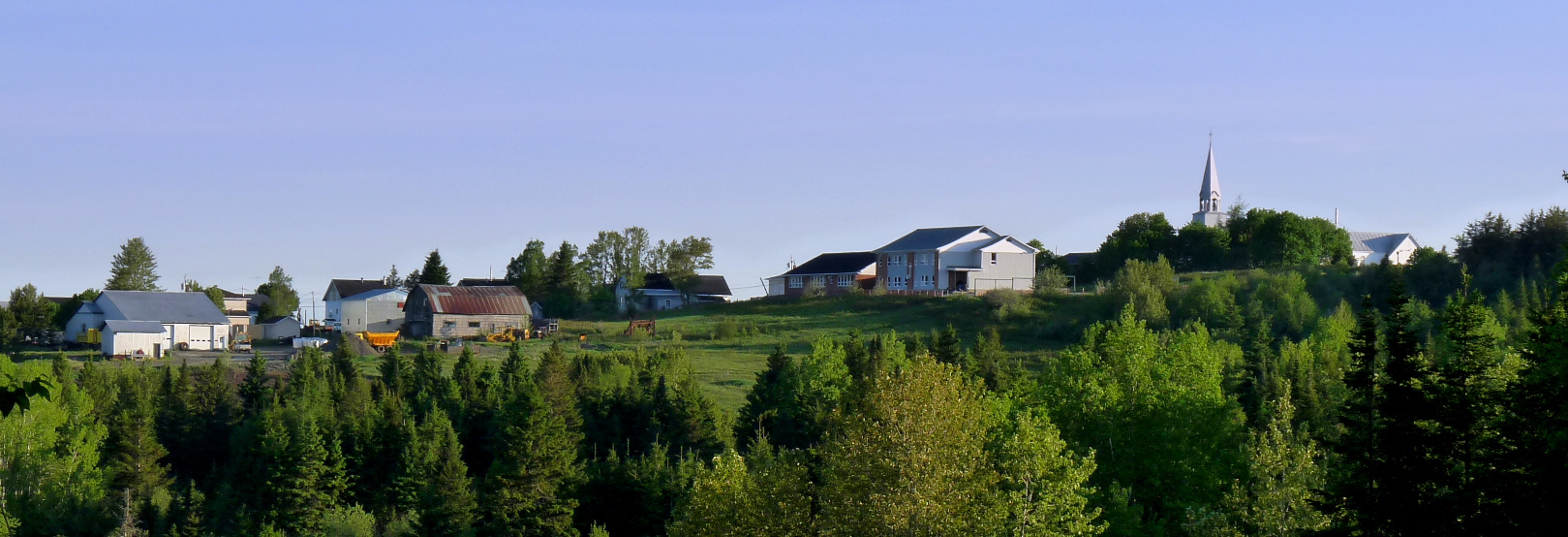
- the village of Sainte-Rita

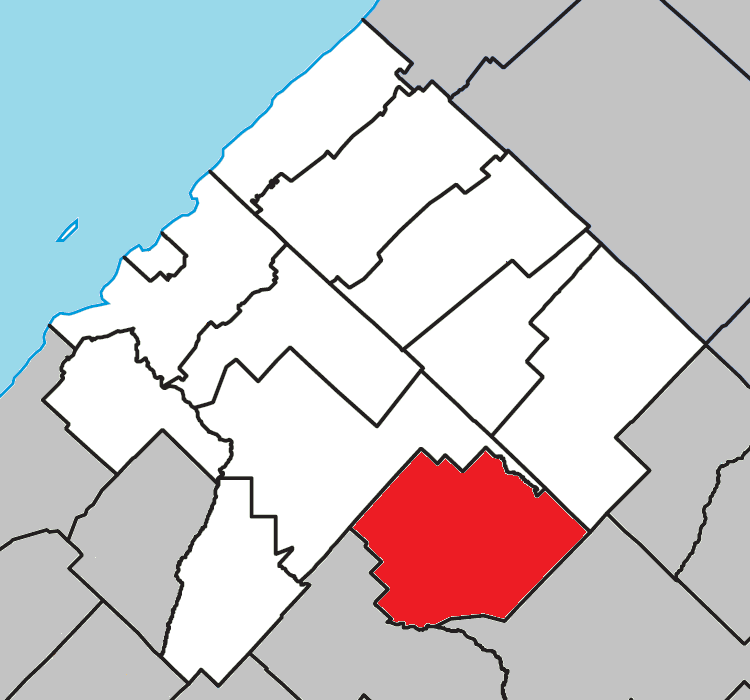
- Location within Les Basques RCM

- Location in eastern Quebec
- Coordinates: 47.95°N 68.9166667°W
- Country: Canada
- Province: Quebec
- Region: Bas-Saint-Laurent
- RCM: Les Basques
- Constituted: January 1, 1948

Government
  - Mayor: Michel Colpron
  - Federal riding: Rimouski-Neigette—Mitis—Matapédia—Les Basques
  - Prov. riding: Rivière-du-Loup–Témiscouata–Les Basques

Area
  - Total: 131.60 km^{2} (50.81 sq mi)
  - Land: 129.52 km^{2} (50.01 sq mi)

Population (2021)
  - Total: 303
  - Density: 2.3/km^{2} (6.0/sq mi)
  - Pop 2016-2021: ▼1.3%
  - Dwellings: 216
- Time zone: UTC−5 (EST)
  - Summer (DST): UTC−4 (EDT)
- Postal code(s): G0L 4G0
- Area codes: 418 and 581
- Highways: R-295
- Website: www.municipalite. sainte-rita.qc.ca

Sainte-Rita (French pronunciation: [sɛ̃t ʁita]) is a municipality in Les Basques Regional County Municipality in Quebec, Canada.

== Demographics ==
In the 2021 Census of Population conducted by Statistics Canada, Sainte-Rita had a population of 303 living in 142 of its 216 total private dwellings, a change of −1.3% from its 2016 population of 307. With a land area of 129.52 km^{2} (50.01 sq mi), it had a population density of 2.3/km^{2} (6.1/sq mi) in 2021.

=== Population ===
Canada census – Sainte-Rita community profile

	2021	2016	2011
Population	303 (-1.3% from 2016)	307 (-1.9% from 2011)	313 (-11.8% from 2006)
Land area	129.52 km^{2} (50.01 sq mi)	129.44 km^{2} (49.98 sq mi)	129.84 km^{2} (50.13 sq mi)
Population density	2.3/km^{2} (6.0/sq mi)	2.4/km^{2} (6.2/sq mi)	2.4/km^{2} (6.2/sq mi)
Median age	54.4 (M: 54, F: 54.4)	51.8 (M: 51.5, F: 51.8)	49.8 (M: 49.4, F: 50.5)
Private dwellings	216 (total)	224 (total)	164 (total)
Median household income	$51,200	$41,024	$37,483

References: 2021 2016 2011

Historical Census Data - Sainte-Rita, Quebec
Year	Pop.	±%
1951	1,027	—
1956	1,076	+4.8%
1961	1,000	−7.1%
1966	947	−5.3%
1971	747	−21.1%
1976	577	−22.8%
1981	516	−10.6%
1986	462	−10.5%
1991	402	−13.0%
1996	387	−3.7%
2001	388	+0.3%
2006	355	−8.5%
2011	313	−11.8%
2016	307	−1.9%
2021	303	−1.3%

=== Language ===
Canada Census Mother Tongue - Sainte-Rita, Quebec
Census	Total	French			English			French & English			Other		
Year	Responses	Count	Trend	Pop %	Count	Trend	Pop %	Count	Trend	Pop %	Count	Trend	Pop %
2021	305	295	▼3.3%	96.7%	0	▼100.0%	0.0%	0	0.0%	0.0%	0	0.0%	0.0%
2016	310	305	▼1.6%	98.4%	5	▲ n/a%	1.6%	0	0.0%	0.0%	0	0.0%	0.0%
2011	310	310	▼11.4%	100.0%	0	0.0%	0.0%	0	0.0%	0.0%	0	0.0%	0.0%
2006	350	350	▼2.8%	100.0%	0	0.0%	0.0%	0	0.0%	0.0%	0	0.0%	0.0%
2001	360	360	▲1.4%	100.0%	0	▼100.0%	0.0%	0	0.0%	0.0%	0	0.0%	0.0%
1996	365	355	n/a	97.3%	10	n/a	2.7%	0	n/a	0.0%	0	n/a	0.0%

== See also ==
- List of municipalities in Quebec
