= Saint-Médard, Quebec =

Saint-Médard
- Municipality

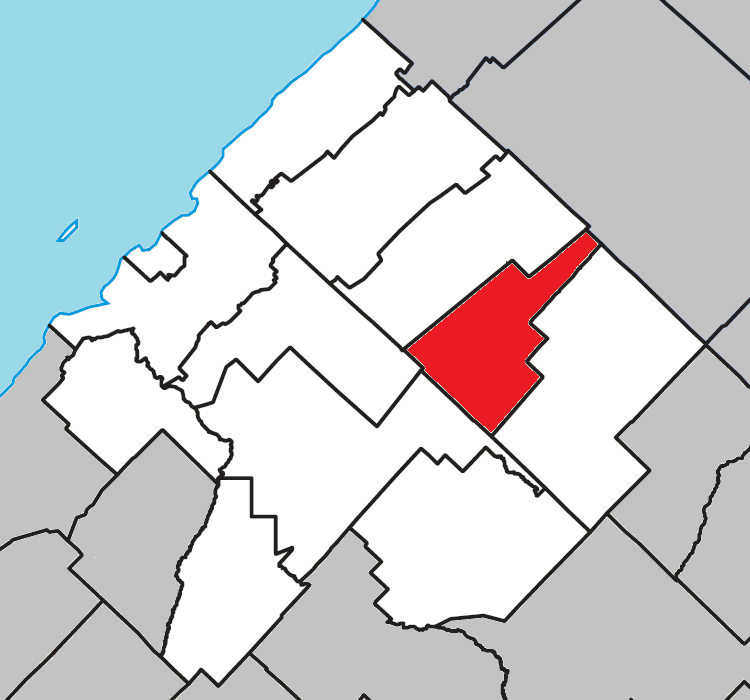
- Location within Les Basques RCM

- Location in eastern Quebec
- Coordinates: 48°02′N 68°54′W
- Country: Canada
- Province: Quebec
- Region: Bas-Saint-Laurent
- RCM: Les Basques
- Constituted: January 1, 1949

Government
  - Mayor: Rodolphe Thériault
  - Federal riding: Rimouski-Neigette—Mitis—Matapédia—Les Basques
  - Prov. riding: Rivière-du-Loup–Témiscouata–Les Basques

Area
  - Total: 74.80 km^{2} (28.88 sq mi)
  - Land: 75.28 km^{2} (29.07 sq mi)
- There is an apparent contradiction between two authoritative sources

Population (2021)
  - Total: 216
  - Density: 2.9/km^{2} (7.5/sq mi)
  - Pop 2016-2011: ▲3.3%
  - Dwellings: 120
- Time zone: UTC−5 (EST)
  - Summer (DST): UTC−4 (EDT)
- Postal code(s): G0L 3V0
- Area codes: 418 and 581
- Highways: R-296
- Website: www.info-basques.com/ stmedard/index.htm

Saint-Médard (French pronunciation: [sɛ̃ medaʁ]) is a municipality in Quebec, Canada.

== Demographics ==
=== Population ===
Canada census – Saint-Médard community profile

	2021	2016	2011
Population	216 (+3.3% from 2016)	209 (-5.9% from 2011)	222 (-11.9% from 2006)
Land area	75.28 km^{2} (29.07 sq mi)	75.28 km^{2} (29.07 sq mi)	75.88 km^{2} (29.30 sq mi)
Population density	2.9/km^{2} (7.5/sq mi)	2.8/km^{2} (7.3/sq mi)	2.9/km^{2} (7.5/sq mi)
Median age	56 (M: 56, F: 56)	57.3 (M: 56.5, F: 58.0)	52.3 (M: 50.8, F: 53.0)
Private dwellings	120 (total)	115 (total)	116 (total)
Median household income	$n/a	$n/a	$n/a

References: 2021 2016 2011

Historical Census Data - Saint-Médard, Quebec
Year	Pop.	±%
1951	606	—
1956	637	+5.1%
1961	661	+3.8%
1966	589	−10.9%
1971	478	−18.8%
1976	398	−16.7%
1981	404	+1.5%
1986	374	−7.4%
1991	321	−14.2%
1996	314	−2.2%
2001	281	−10.5%
2006	252	−10.3%
2011	222	−11.9%
2016	209	−5.9%
2021	216	+3.3%

=== Language ===
Canada Census Mother Tongue - Saint-Médard, Quebec
Census	Total	French			English			French & English			Other		
Year	Responses	Count	Trend	Pop %	Count	Trend	Pop %	Count	Trend	Pop %	Count	Trend	Pop %
2021	215	210	0.0%	97.7%	5	▲ n/a%	2.3%	0	0.0%	0.0%	0	0.0%	0.0%
2016	210	210	▼4.5%	100.0%	0	▼100.0%	0.0%	0	0.0%	0.0%	0	0.0%	0.0%
2011	225	220	▼12.0%	97.8%	5	▲ n/a%	2.2%	0	0.0%	0.0%	0	0.0%	0.0%
2006	250	250	▼12.3%	100.0%	0	0.0%	0.0%	0	0.0%	0.0%	0	0.0%	0.0%
2001	285	285	▼9.5%	100.0%	0	0.0%	0.0%	0	0.0%	0.0%	0	0.0%	0.0%
1996	315	315	n/a	100.0%	0	n/a	0.0%	0	n/a	0.0%	0	n/a	0.0%

== See also ==
- List of municipalities in Quebec
