= Sainte-Françoise, Bas-Saint-Laurent =

Sainte-Françoise
- Parish municipality
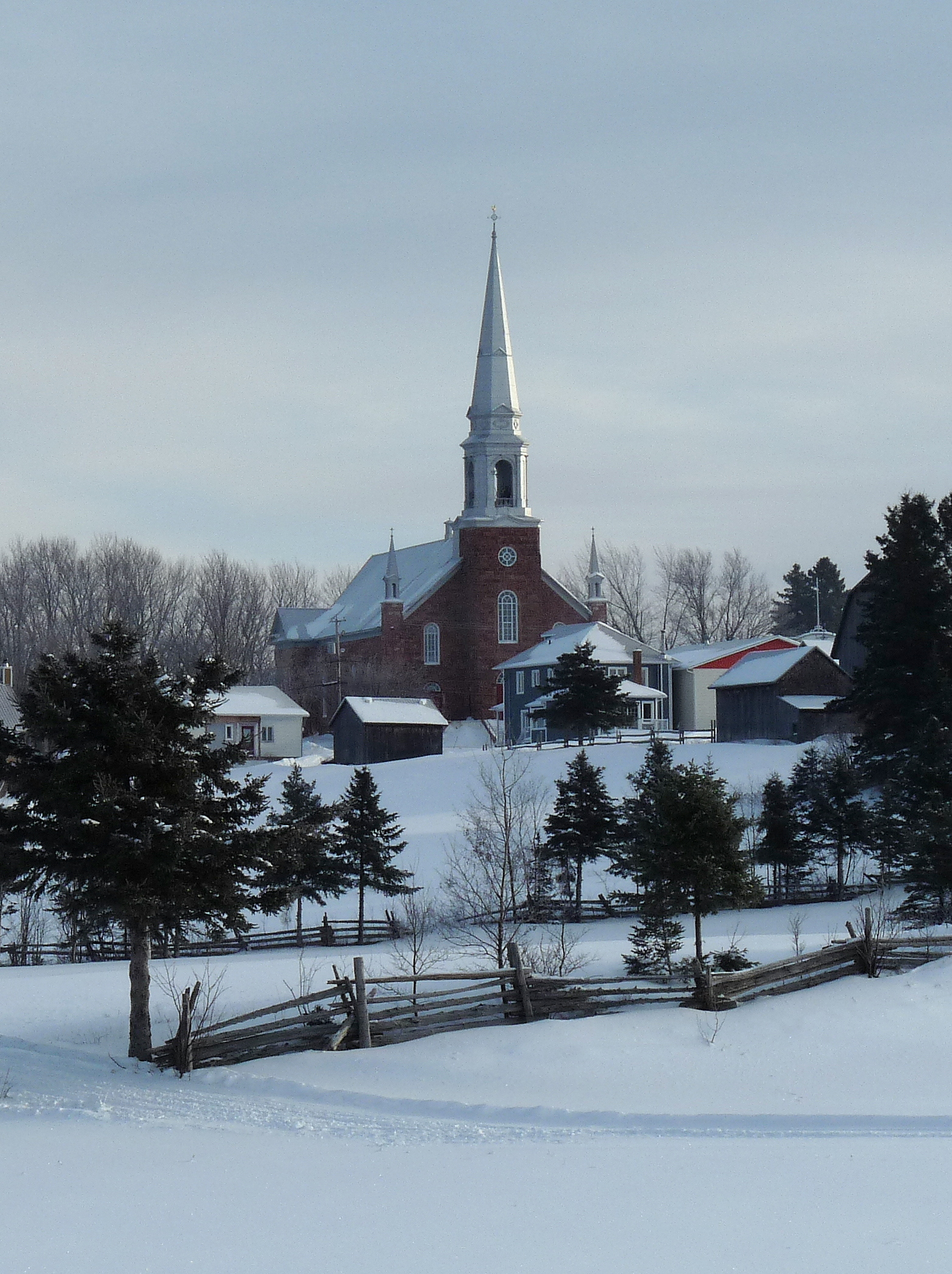

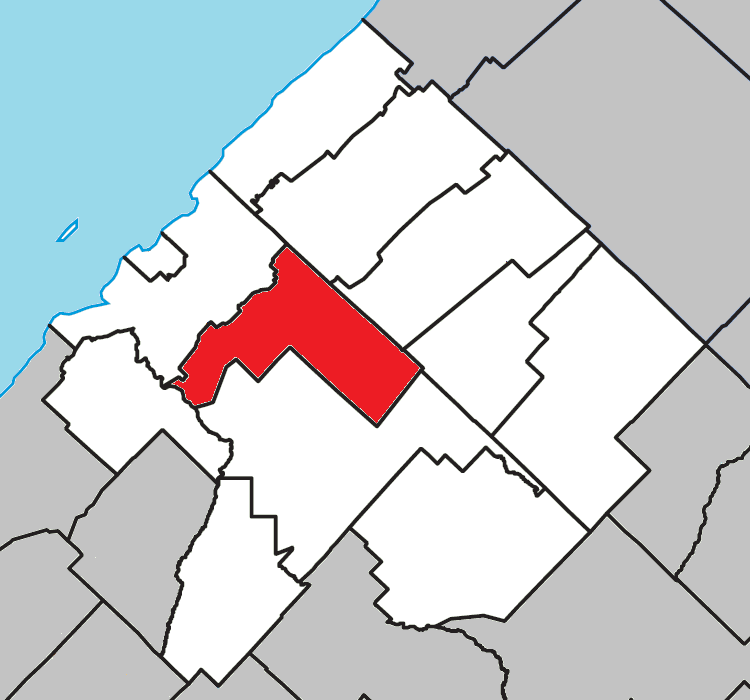
- Location within Les Basques RCM

- Location in eastern Quebec
- Coordinates: 48.095°N 69.0675°W
- Country: Canada
- Province: Quebec
- Region: Bas-Saint-Laurent
- RCM: Les Basques
- Constituted: December 6, 1873

Government
  - Mayor: Simon Lavoie
  - Federal riding: Rimouski-Neigette—Mitis—Matapédia—Les Basques
  - Prov. riding: Rivière-du-Loup–Témiscouata–Les Basques

Area
  - Total: 89.40 km^{2} (34.52 sq mi)
  - Land: 88.83 km^{2} (34.30 sq mi)

Population (2021)
  - Total: 383
  - Density: 4.3/km^{2} (11/sq mi)
  - Pop 2016-2021: ▼0.8%
  - Dwellings: 209
- Time zone: UTC−5 (EST)
  - Summer (DST): UTC−4 (EDT)
- Postal code(s): G0L 3B0
- Area codes: 418 and 581
- Highways: R-293; R-296
- Website: sainte-francoise.org

Sainte-Françoise (French pronunciation: [sɛ̃t fʁɑ̃swaz]) is a parish municipality in the Bas-Saint-Laurent region of Quebec, Canada.

== Demographics ==
Historical Census Data - Sainte-Françoise, Bas-Saint-Laurent, Quebec
Year	Pop.	±%
1881	659	—
1891	704	+6.8%
1901	708	+0.6%
1911	890	+25.7%
1921	1,060	+19.1%
1931	1,074	+1.3%
1941	1,136	+5.8%
1951	1,176	+3.5%
1956	1,236	+5.1%
1961	1,073	−13.2%
1966	934	−13.0%
1971	763	−18.3%
1976	647	−15.2%
1981	601	−7.1%
1986	570	−5.2%
1991	506	−11.2%
1996	467	−7.7%
2001	453	−3.0%
2006	431	−4.9%
2011	399	−7.4%
2016	386	−3.3%
2021	383	−0.8%

In the 2021 Census of Population conducted by Statistics Canada, Sainte-Françoise had a population of 383 living in 192 of its 209 total private dwellings, a change of −0.8% from its 2016 population of 386. With a land area of 88.83 km^{2} (34.30 sq mi), it had a population density of 4.3/km^{2} (11.2/sq mi) in 2021.

Canada census – Sainte-Françoise community profile

	2021	2016	2011
Population	383 (-0.8% from 2016)	386 (-3.3% from 2011)	399 (-7.4% from 2006)
Land area	88.83 km^{2} (34.30 sq mi)	88.88 km^{2} (34.32 sq mi)	88.07 km^{2} (34.00 sq mi)
Population density	4.3/km^{2} (11/sq mi)	4.3/km^{2} (11/sq mi)	4.5/km^{2} (12/sq mi)
Median age	56 (M: 55.6, F: 56)	54.4 (M: 55.4, F: 53.4)	52.6 (M: 53.5, F: 51.6)
Private dwellings	209 (total)	213 (total)	229 (total)
Median household income	$50,000	$43,328	$40,716

References: 2021 2016 2011

Canada Census Mother Tongue - Sainte-Françoise, Bas-Saint-Laurent, Quebec
Census	Total	French			English			French & English			Other		
Year	Responses	Count	Trend	Pop %	Count	Trend	Pop %	Count	Trend	Pop %	Count	Trend	Pop %
2021	385	380	▼1.3%	98.7%	5	0.0%	1.3%	5	▲ n/a%	1.3%	0	0.0%	0.0%
2016	385	385	▼2.5%	100.0%	5	0.0%	1.3%	0	▼100.0%	0.0%	0	0.0%	0.0%
2011	405	395	▼3.7%	97.5%	5	▲ n/a%	1.2%	5	▲ n/a%	1.2%	0	▼100.0%	0.0%
2006	420	410	▼8.9%	97.6%	0	0.0%	0.0%	0	0.0%	0.0%	10	▲ n/a%	2.4%
2001	450	450	▼3.2%	100.0%	0	0.0%	0.0%	0	0.0%	0.0%	0	0.0%	0.0%
1996	465	465	n/a	100.0%	0	n/a	0.0%	0	n/a	0.0%	0	n/a	0.0%

== Government ==
=== Municipal council ===
Municipal council (2026):

- Mayor: Simon Lavoie
- Councillors: Erick Tremblay, Wilson Henley, David Letendre, Véronik Rioux-Pin, André Charbonneau, Kelly-Anne Bouffard

== See also ==
- List of parish municipalities in Quebec
