= Quebec Route 296 =

Highway in Quebec, Canada

Route 296

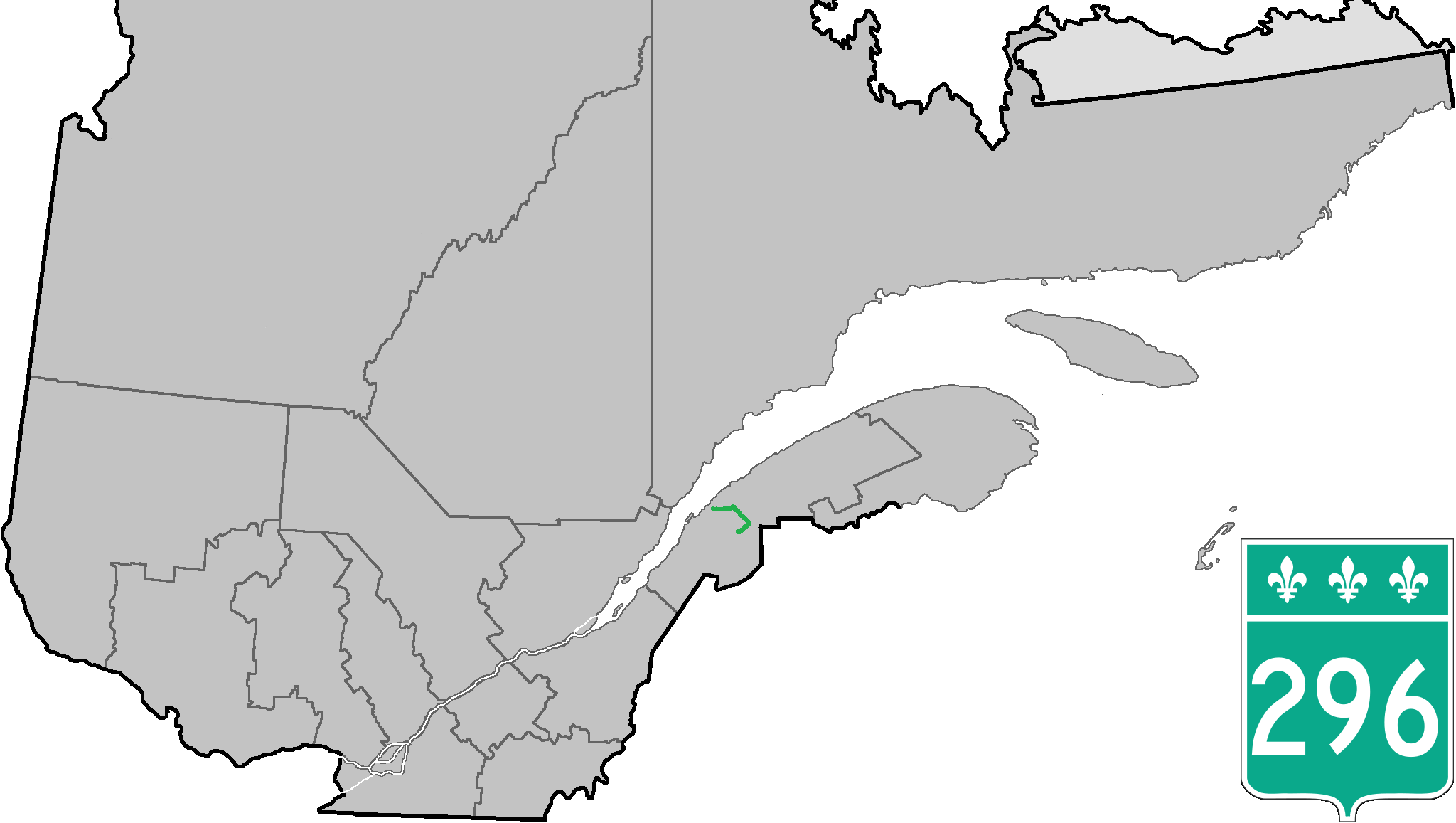

Route information
- Length: 60 km (37 mi)

Major junctions
- West end: R-293 near Sainte-Françoise
- R-232 in Lac-des-Aigles
- East end: R-295 in Saint-Michel-du-Squatec

Location
- Country: Canada
- Province: Quebec
- Major cities: Saint-Michel-du-Squatec, Lac-des-Aigles

Highway system
- Quebec provincial highways; Autoroutes; List; Former
← R-295	→ R-297

Route 296 is 60 km two-lane north/south highway in Quebec, Canada, which starts west of Sainte-Françoise at the junction of Route 293 and ends in Saint-Michel-du-Squatec at the junction of Route 295. Provincial highways with even numbers usually follow the Saint Lawrence River in a somewhat east/west direction, but Route 296 is a north/south highway in most of its length.

== Towns along Route 296 ==
- Saint-Michel-du-Squatec
- Biencourt
- Lac-des-Aigles
- Saint-Médard
- Sainte-Françoise
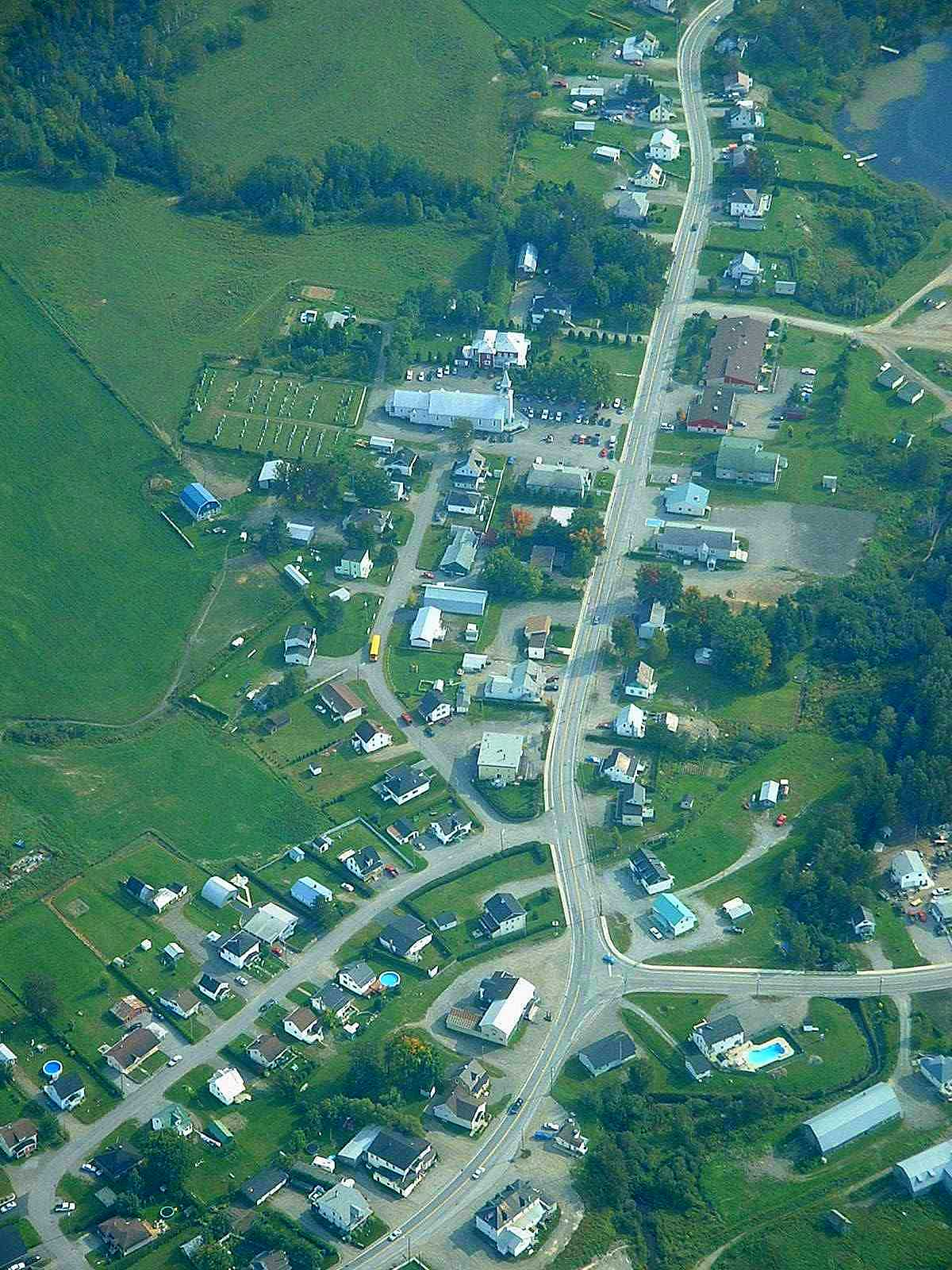
Route 296 shares its itinerary with Route 232 in Lac-des-Aigles.

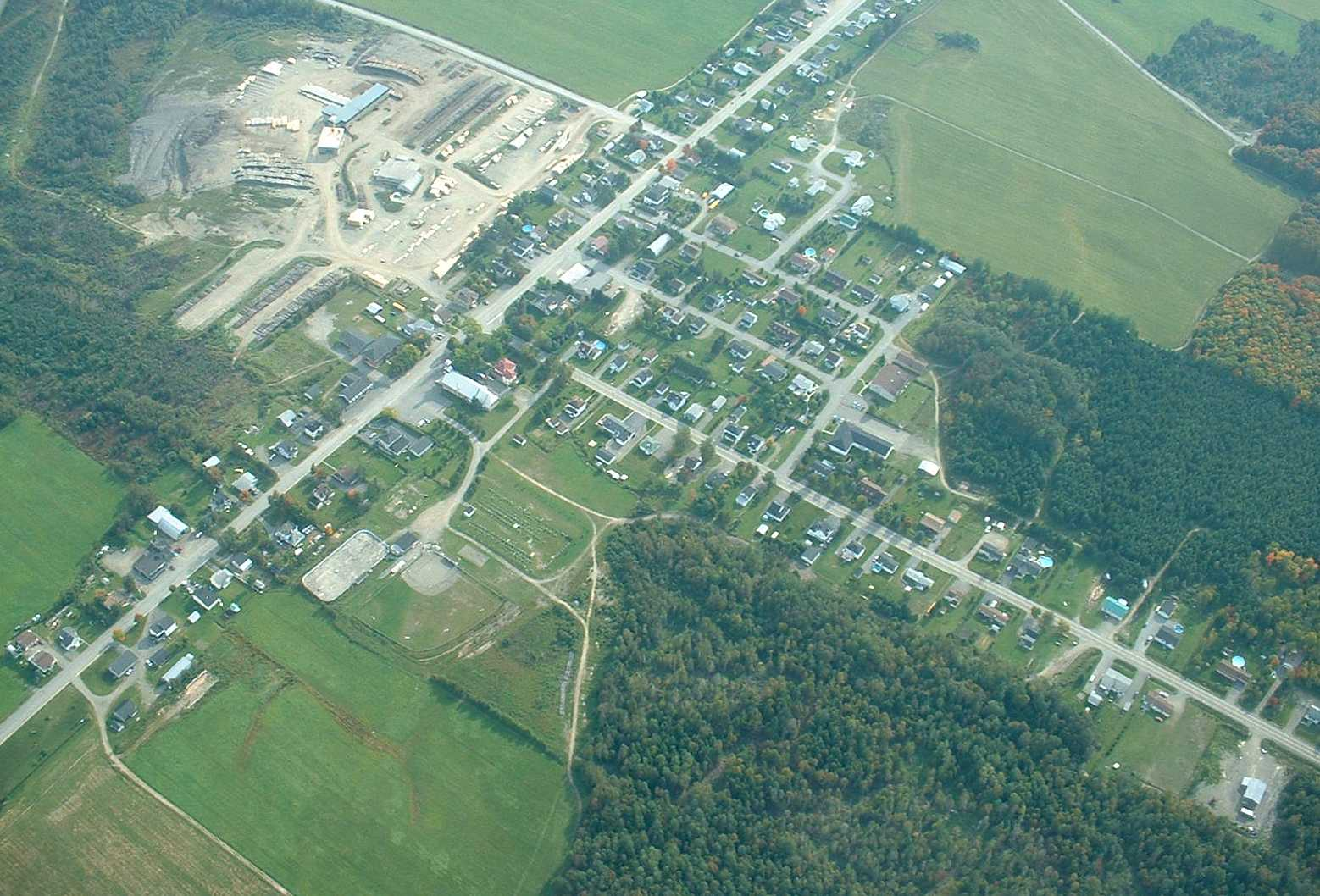
Route 296 bifurcates from Principale street onto Berger street in Biencourt.

== See also ==
- List of Quebec provincial highways
