= Saint-Jean-de-Dieu =

- Municipality
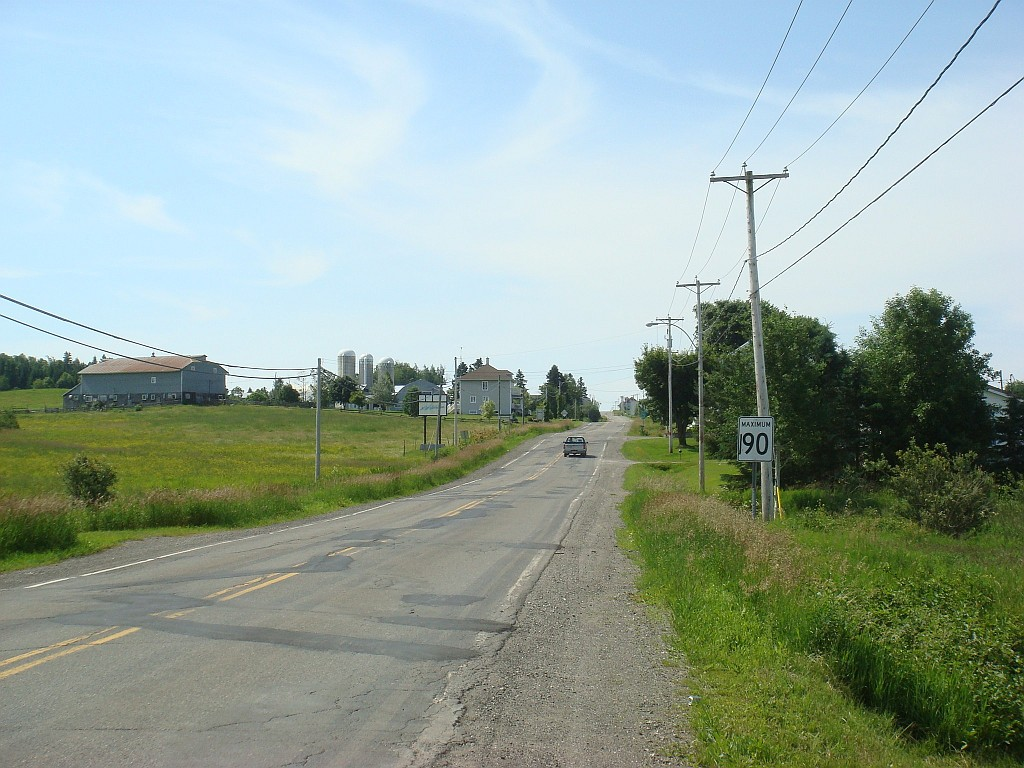

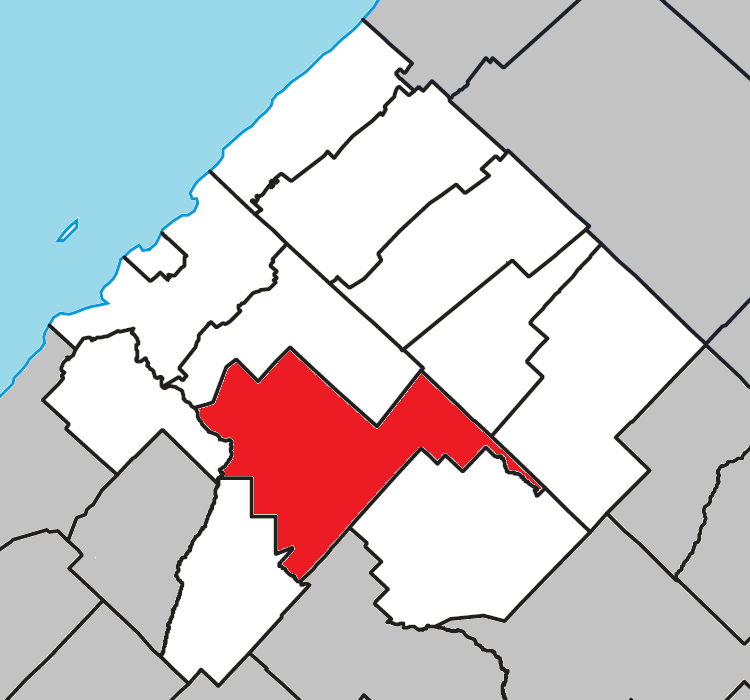
- Location within Les Basques RCM

- Location in eastern Quebec
- Coordinates: 48°N 69.05°W
- Country: Canada
- Province: Quebec
- Region: Bas-Saint-Laurent
- RCM: Les Basques
- Constituted: January 1, 1865

Government
  - Mayor: Stéphane Rioux
  - Federal riding: Rimouski-Neigette—Mitis—Matapédia—Les Basques
  - Prov. riding: Rivière-du-Loup–Témiscouata–Les Basques

Area
  - Total: 151.60 km^{2} (58.53 sq mi)
  - Land: 152.04 km^{2} (58.70 sq mi)

Population (2021)
  - Total: 1,651
  - Density: 10.9/km^{2} (28/sq mi)
  - Pop 2016-2021: ▲3.4%
  - Dwellings: 742
- Time zone: UTC−5 (EST)
  - Summer (DST): UTC−4 (EDT)
- Postal code(s): G0L 3M0
- Area codes: 418 and 581
- Highways: R-293; R-295
- Website: www.saintjeandedieu.ca

Saint-Jean-de-Dieu (French pronunciation: [sɛ̃ ʒɑ̃ də djø]) is a municipality in Quebec, Canada. The municipality had a population of 1,651 in the Canada 2021 Census.

The two main settlements within the municipality are the communities of Saint-Jean-de-Dieu and La Société.

== Demographics ==
Population

Canada census – Saint-Jean-de-Dieu community profile

	2021	2016	2011
Population	1,651 (+3.4% from 2016)	1,596 (-0.6% from 2011)	1,606 (-3.9% from 2006)
Land area	152.04 km^{2} (58.70 sq mi)	152.38 km^{2} (58.83 sq mi)	151.02 km^{2} (58.31 sq mi)
Population density	10.9/km^{2} (28/sq mi)	10.5/km^{2} (27/sq mi)	10.6/km^{2} (27/sq mi)
Median age	52.8 (M: 52, F: 53.2)	51.9 (M: 51.6, F: 52.2)	50.2 (M: 49.8, F: 50.6)
Private dwellings	700 (total)	755 (total)	740 (total)
Median household income	$54,400	$46,976	$39,983

References: 2021 2016 2011

Historical Census Data - Saint-Jean-de-Dieu, Quebec
Year	Pop.	±%
1871	677	—
1881	1,290	+90.5%
1891	1,055	−18.2%
1901	1,357	+28.6%
1911	1,962	+44.6%
1921	2,121	+8.1%
1931	2,501	+17.9%
1941	2,298	−8.1%
1951	2,406	+4.7%
1956	2,663	+10.7%
1961	2,799	+5.1%
1966	2,584	−7.7%
1971	2,262	−12.5%
1976	2,107	−6.9%
1981	2,136	+1.4%
1986	2,063	−3.4%
1991	1,893	−8.2%
1996	1,828	−3.4%
2001	1,768	−3.3%
2006	1,671	−5.5%
2011	1,606	−3.9%
2016	1,596	−0.6%
2021	1,651	+3.4%

Language

Canada Census Mother Tongue - Saint-Jean-de-Dieu, Quebec
Census	Total	French			English			French & English			Other		
Year	Responses	Count	Trend	Pop %	Count	Trend	Pop %	Count	Trend	Pop %	Count	Trend	Pop %
2021	1,640	1,625	▲4.8%	99.1%	5	▲ n/a%	0.3%	5	▲ n/a%	0.3%	10	▲ n/a%	0.6%
2016	1,555	1,550	▼1.3%	99.7%	0	0.0%	0.0%	0	0.0%	0.0%	0	0.0%	0.0%
2011	1,570	1,570	▲0.3%	100.0%	0	0.0%	0.0%	0	0.0%	0.0%	0	▼100.0%	0.0%
2006	1,580	1,565	▼8.5%	99.1%	0	0.0%	0.0%	0	0.0%	0.0%	15	▲ n/a%	1.0%
2001	1,710	1,710	▼0.6%	100.0%	0	▼100.0%	0.0%	0	▼100.0%	0.0%	0	0.0%	0.0%
1996	1,765	1,720	n/a	97.5%	35	n/a	2.0%	10	n/a	0.6%	0	n/a	0.0%

== Notable people ==
- Philippe Gagnon

== See also ==
- List of municipalities in Quebec
