= Quebec Route 232 =

Highway in Quebec, Canada

Coordinates: 47.8279°N 68.6673°W

Route 232

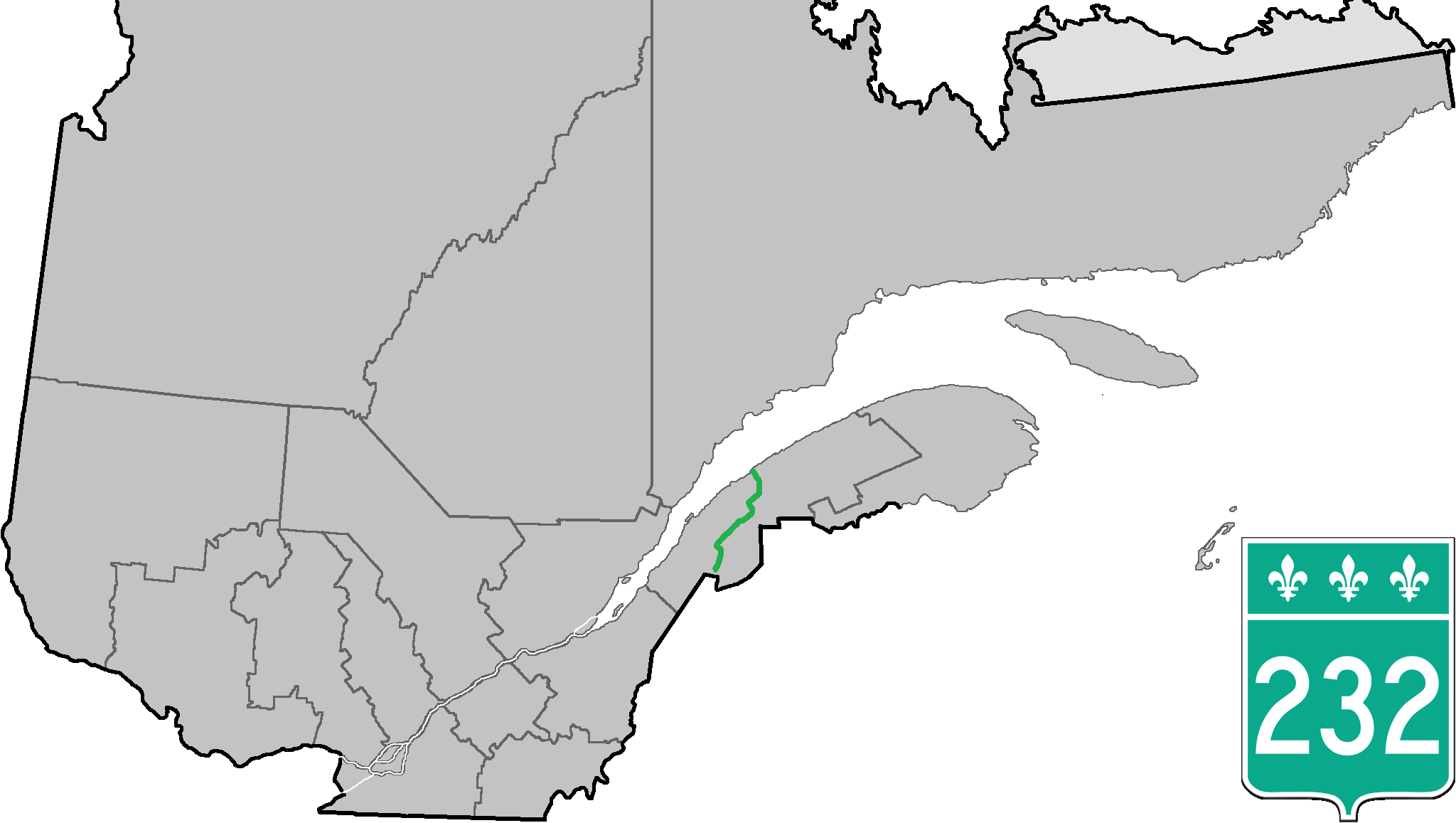

Route information
- Maintained by Transports Québec
- Length: 142.0 km (88.2 mi)

Major junctions
- West end: R-289 in Rivière-Bleue
- A-85 (TCH) in Cabano; R-293 in Cabano; R-295 in Squatec; R-296 in Lac-des-Aigles; R-234 in Saint-Marcellin; A-20 in Rimouski
- East end: R-132 in Rimouski

Location
- Country: Canada
- Province: Quebec
- Major cities: Rimouski, Témiscouata-sur-le-Lac

Highway system
- Quebec provincial highways; Autoroutes; List; Former
← R-231	→ R-233

Route 232 is a two-lane east/west provincial highway on the south shore of the St. Lawrence River in the Bas-Saint-Laurent region of Eastern Quebec, Canada. Its eastern terminus is in Rimouski at the junction of Route 132 and the western terminus is at the junction of Route 289 in Rivière-Bleue. The route temporarily becomes A-85 along a 3 kilometre section through Cabano.

== Municipalities along Route 232 ==
- Rimouski
- Saint-Narcisse-de-Rimouski
- La Trinité-des-Monts
- Esprit-Saint
- Lac-des-Aigles
- Saint-Michel-du-Squatec
- Témiscouata-sur-le-Lac
- Saint-Eusèbe
- Rivière-Bleue
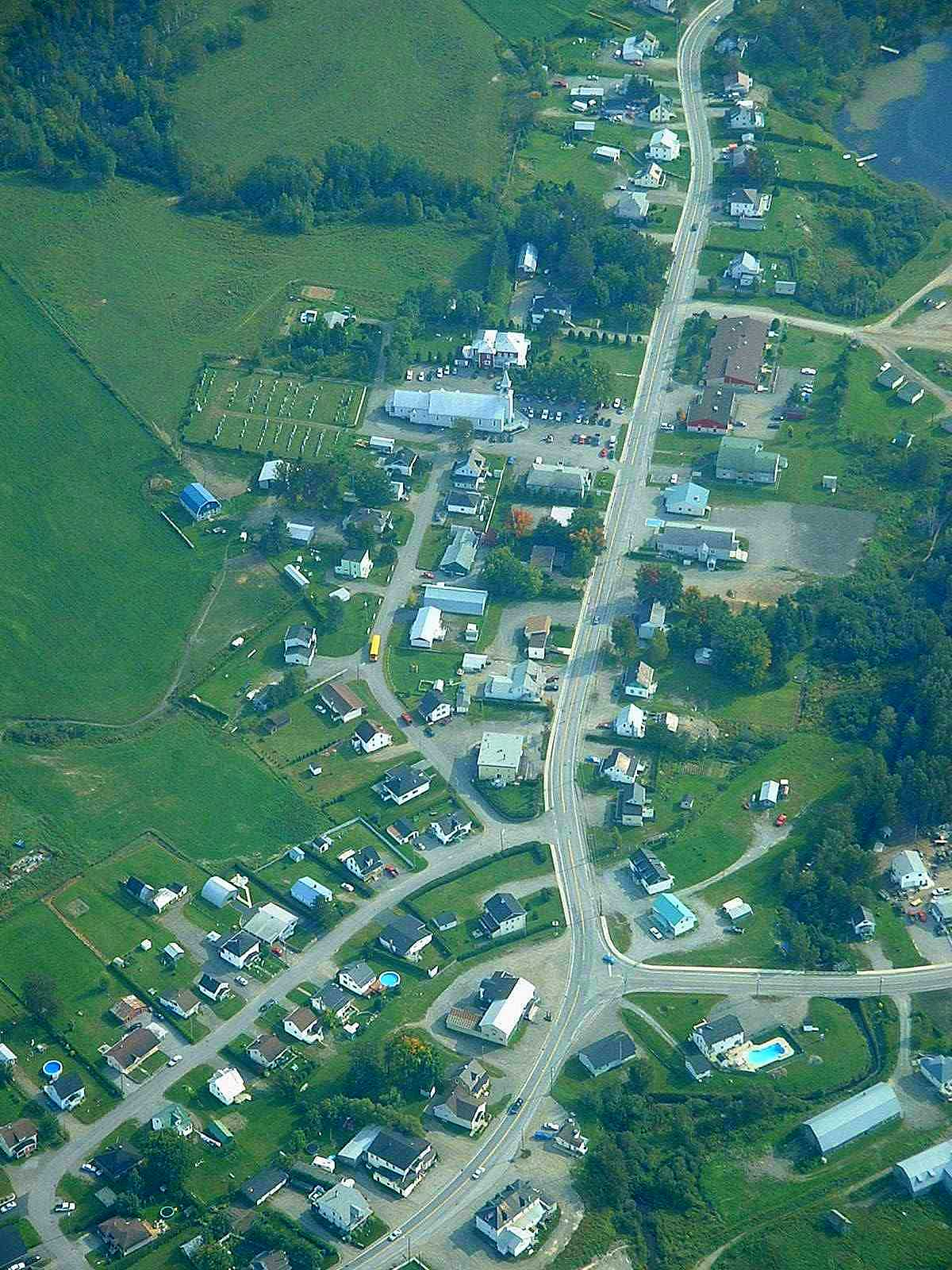
Route 232 runs through Lac-des-Aigles.

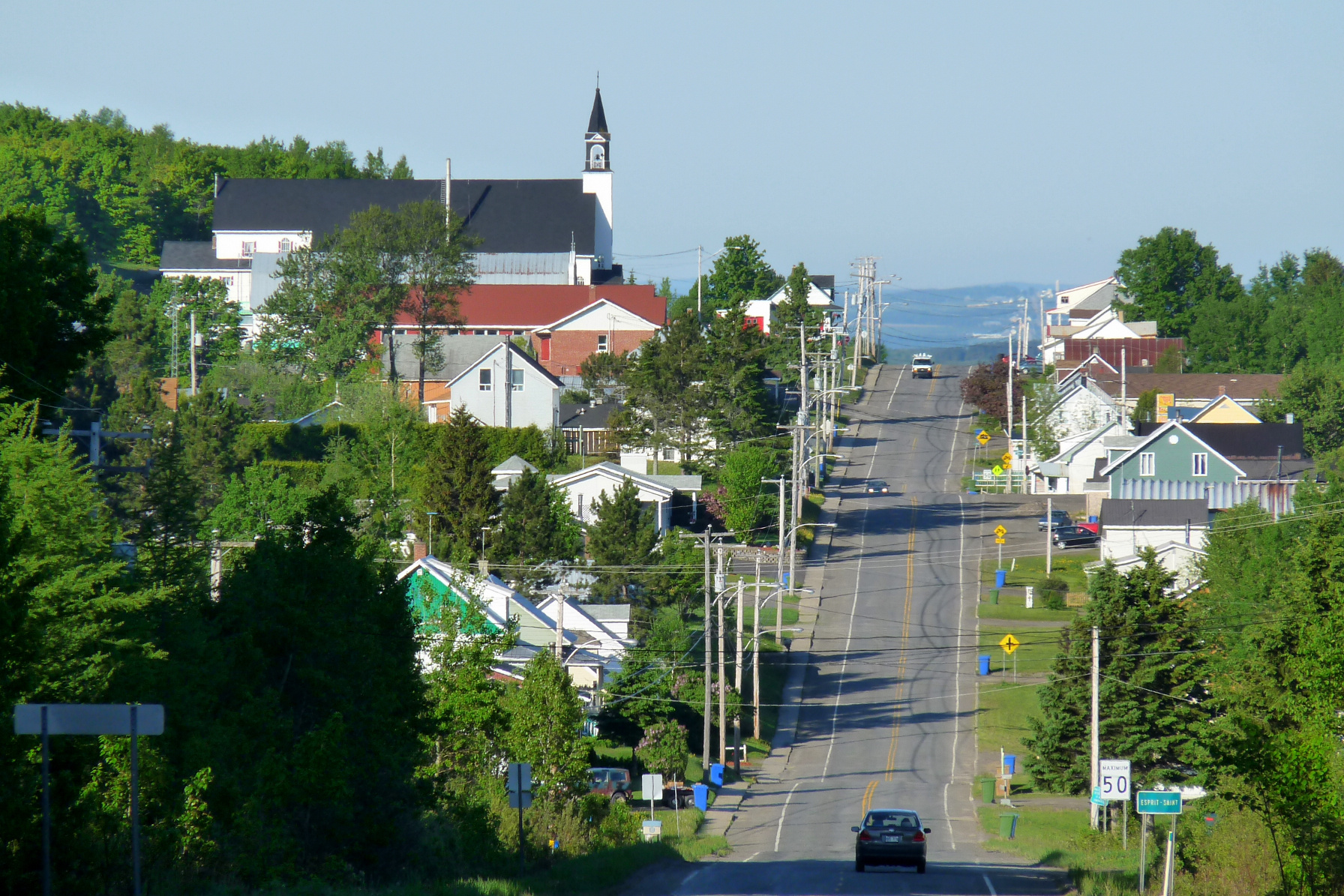
Hilly section between Rimouski and Témiscouata-sur-le-Lac, part of route des Monts-Notre-Dame.

== See also ==
- List of Quebec provincial highways
