= Trois-Pistoles =

- City
- Trois-Pistoles in 2026

- Coat of arms

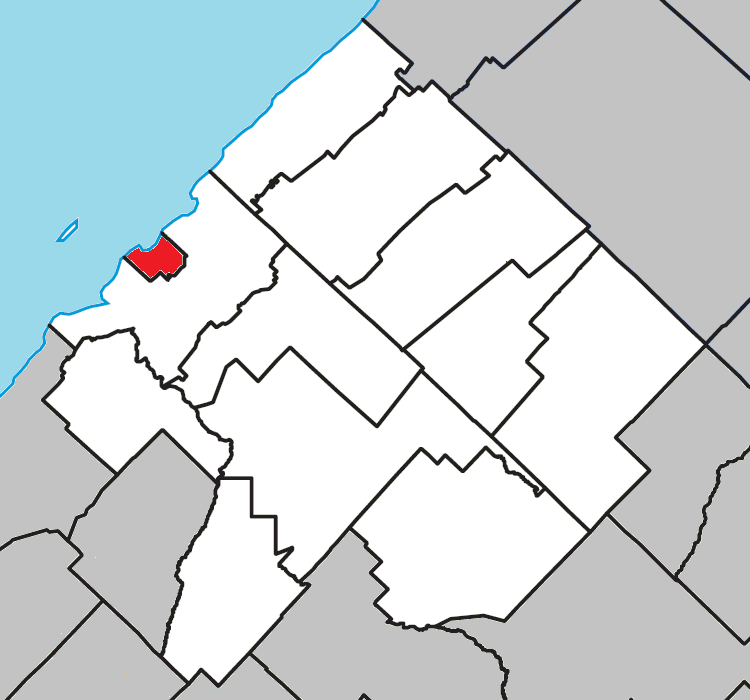
- Location within Les Basques RCM

- Location in eastern Quebec Trois-Pistoles (Canada)
- Coordinates: 48°07′12″N 069°10′48″W
- Country: Canada
- Province: Quebec
- Region: Bas-Saint-Laurent
- RCM: Les Basques
- Constituted: 9 March 1916

Government
  - Mayor: Maurice Vaney
  - Federal riding: Rimouski-Neigette—Mitis—Matapédia—Les Basques
  - Prov. riding: Rivière-du-Loup–Témiscouata–Les Basques

Area
  - City: 9.60 km^{2} (3.71 sq mi)
  - Land: 7.63 km^{2} (2.95 sq mi)
  - Urban: 4.06 km^{2} (1.57 sq mi)

Population (2021)
  - City: 3,115
  - Density: 408.1/km^{2} (1,057/sq mi)
  - Urban: 3,031
  - Urban density: 746.5/km^{2} (1,933/sq mi)
  - Pop 2016–2021: ▼4.0%
  - Dwellings: 1,727
- Time zone: UTC−05:00 (EST)
  - Summer (DST): UTC−04:00 (EDT)
- Postal code(s): G0L 4K0
- Area codes: 418 and 581
- Highways: R-132; R-293
- Website: www.ville-trois-pistoles.ca

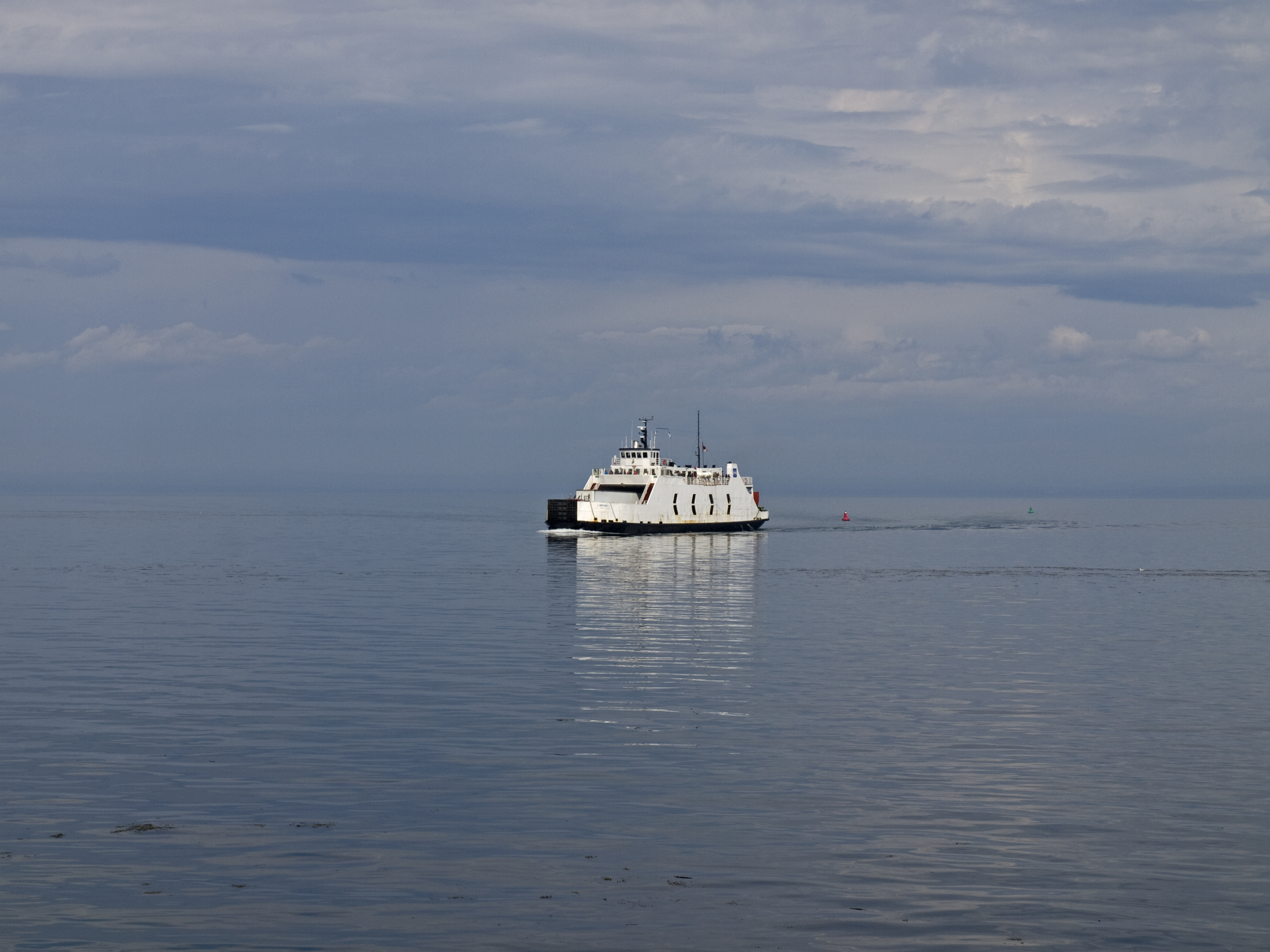
Ferry boat returns to Trois Pistoles from Les Escumins

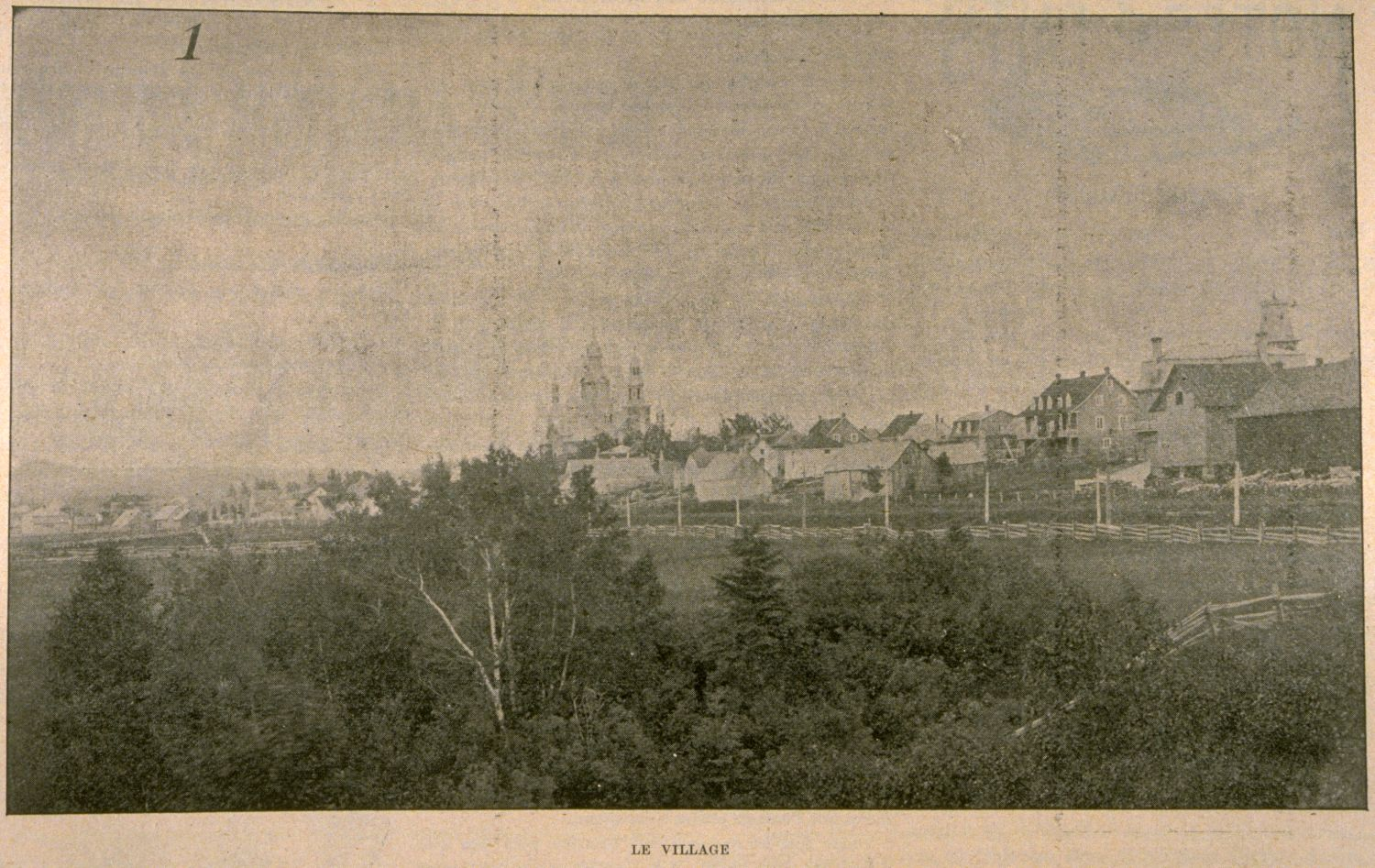
Village of Trois-Pistoles, 1896

Trois-Pistoles (French pronunciation: [tʁwa pistɔl]) is a city in Les Basques Regional County Municipality in the Bas-Saint-Laurent region of Quebec, Canada. It is also the county seat. The town is located on the south shore of the Saint Lawrence River.

A ferry crosses the river to Les Escoumins on the north shore. The port facilities are also used by fishing boats and scuba divers.

The town is the site of the University of Western Ontario's annual French immersion program, which has existed since 1932. It is the oldest such program in Canada.

Just offshore of the town lies Île aux Basques, an island that was used by Basque whalers in the 16th century. The island, part of the surrounding Municipality of Notre-Dame-des-Neiges, is a National Historic Site of Canada and is now a migratory bird sanctuary.

The town hosted the Festival Échofête de Trois-Pistoles, an environmentalism-themed music festival and fair each July from 2002 to 2014. At the time it was Quebec's largest environmental festival.

The town can be reached by Via Rail on the named train The Ocean, between Montreal and Halifax.

The town is said to have been named for a silver goblet worth three pistoles, an old French coin equivalent to the Spanish Doubloon, that was lost in the river in the 17th century.

== Geography ==
=== Climate ===
Climate data for Trois-Pistoles
Month	Jan	Feb	Mar	Apr	May	Jun	Jul	Aug	Sep	Oct	Nov	Dec	Year
Record high °C (°F)	12 (54)	11 (52)	17.8 (64.0)	27 (81)	31.7 (89.1)	32 (90)	35 (95)	33.9 (93.0)	31 (88)	23.3 (73.9)	21 (70)	15 (59)	35 (95)
Mean daily maximum °C (°F)	−8 (18)	−6.4 (20.5)	−0.4 (31.3)	6.4 (43.5)	14.3 (57.7)	20.2 (68.4)	23 (73)	21.4 (70.5)	16 (61)	9.4 (48.9)	2.4 (36.3)	−4.7 (23.5)	7.8 (46.0)
Daily mean °C (°F)	−12 (10)	−10.1 (13.8)	−4.2 (24.4)	2.5 (36.5)	9.3 (48.7)	15 (59)	17.7 (63.9)	16.5 (61.7)	11.6 (52.9)	5.9 (42.6)	−0.5 (31.1)	−8.1 (17.4)	3.6 (38.5)
Mean daily minimum °C (°F)	−15.8 (3.6)	−13.9 (7.0)	−8.1 (17.4)	−1.4 (29.5)	4.2 (39.6)	9.7 (49.5)	12.5 (54.5)	11.5 (52.7)	7.2 (45.0)	2.4 (36.3)	−3.3 (26.1)	−11.4 (11.5)	−0.6 (30.9)
Record low °C (°F)	−34.4 (−29.9)	−31.7 (−25.1)	−25.5 (−13.9)	−18 (0)	−7.2 (19.0)	0 (32)	3.3 (37.9)	1.7 (35.1)	−2.8 (27.0)	−7.8 (18.0)	−18 (0)	−28.5 (−19.3)	−34.4 (−29.9)
Average precipitation mm (inches)	83.9 (3.30)	67.8 (2.67)	77.3 (3.04)	73.9 (2.91)	88.3 (3.48)	84.2 (3.31)	93.3 (3.67)	87.6 (3.45)	90.5 (3.56)	92.5 (3.64)	78.3 (3.08)	87.6 (3.45)	1,005.3 (39.58)
Source: Environment Canada

== Demographics ==
Historical Census Data – Trois-Pistoles, Quebec
Year	Pop.	±%
1921	1,454	—
1931	1,837	+26.3%
1941	2,176	+18.5%
1951	3,537	+62.5%
1956	4,039	+14.2%
1961	4,349	+7.7%
1966	4,710	+8.3%
1971	4,678	−0.7%
1976	4,554	−2.7%
1981	4,445	−2.4%
1986	4,290	−3.5%
1991	3,886	−9.4%
1996	3,807	−2.0%
2001	3,635	−4.5%
2006	3,500	−3.7%
2011	3,253	−7.1%
2016	3,246	−0.2%
2021	3,115	−4.0%

In the 2021 Census of Population conducted by Statistics Canada, Trois-Pistoles had a population of 3,115 living in 1,562 of its 1,727 total private dwellings, a change of −4% from its 2016 population of 3,246. With a land area of 7.63 km^{2} (2.95 sq mi), it had a population density of 408.3/km^{2} (1,057.4/sq mi) in 2021.

Canada census – Trois-Pistoles community profile

	2021	2016	2011
Population	3,115 (-4.0% from 2016)	3,246 (-6.1% from 2011)	3,456 (-1.3% from 2006)
Land area	7.63 km^{2} (2.95 sq mi)	7.64 km^{2} (2.95 sq mi)	7.66 km^{2} (2.96 sq mi)
Population density	408.1/km^{2} (1,057/sq mi)	425.1/km^{2} (1,101/sq mi)	450.9/km^{2} (1,168/sq mi)
Median age	59.6 (M: 57.6, F: 61.6)	58.0 (M: 55.9, F: 60.0)	55.2 (M: 53.0, F: 56.7)
Private dwellings	1,727 (total)	1,770 (total)	1,757 (total)
Median household income	$48,000	$40,448	$38,395

References: 2021 2016 2011

Canada Census Mother Tongue – Trois-Pistoles, Quebec
Census	Total	French			English			French & English			Other		
Year	Responses	Count	Trend	Pop %	Count	Trend	Pop %	Count	Trend	Pop %	Count	Trend	Pop %
2021	2,995	2,950	▼6.5%	98.5%	15	0.0%	0.5%	10	▲ n/a%	0.3%	20	▲ n/a%	0.7%
2016	3,175	3,155	▼6.5%	99.4%	15	0.0%	0.5%	0	▼100.0%	0.0%	0	0.0%	0.0%
2011	3,395	3,375	▲5.3%	99.4%	15	▲ n/a%	0.4%	5	▲ n/a%	0.2%	0	▼100.0%	0.0%
2006	3,250	3,195	▼6.2%	98.3%	0	▼100.0%	0.0%	0	0.0%	0.0%	55	▲ n/a%	1.7%
2001	3,430	3,405	▼3.7%	99.3%	25	▼28.6%	0.7%	0	▼100.0%	0.0%	0	0.0%	0.0%
1996	3,580	3,535	n/a	98.7%	35	n/a	1.0%	10	n/a	0.3%	0	n/a	0.0%

== Media ==
- FM 93.9 – CIEL-FM-4, adult contemporary
- FM 104.9 – CIBM-FM-2, hot adult contemporary

== See also ==
- List of cities in Quebec
- Trois Pistoles station
- Trois-Pistoles, a Belgian-style beer from Unibroue, a Quebec brewery now owned by Sapporo Brewery.
