= Quebec Route 295 =

Highway in Quebec, Canada

Route 295

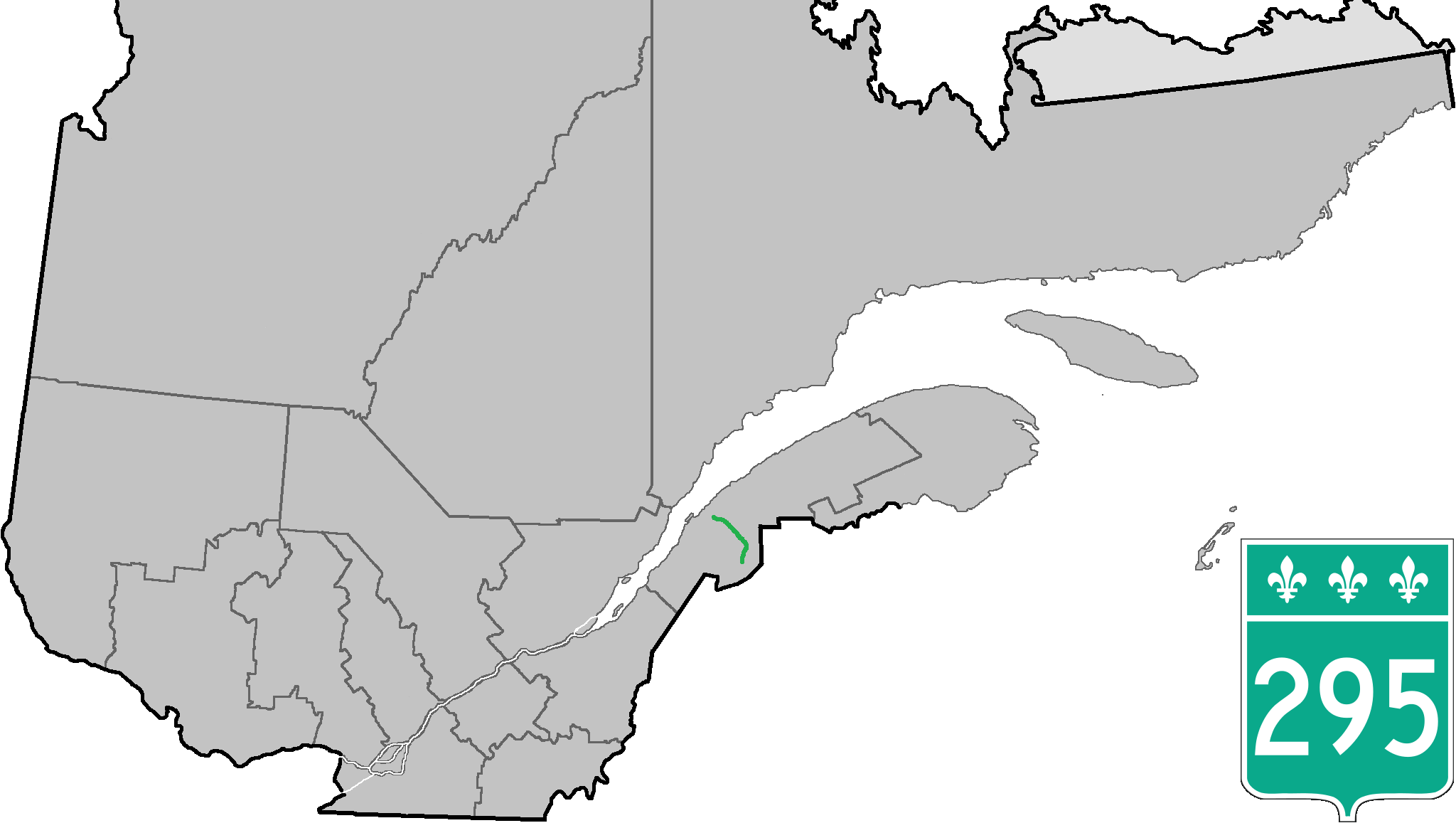

Route information
- Length: 98 km (61 mi)

Major junctions
- North end: R-293 in Saint-Jean-sur-Dieu
- R-232 in Squatec; R-296 in Saint-Michel-du-Squatec
- South end: A-85 (TCH) in Degelis

Location
- Country: Canada
- Province: Quebec
- Major cities: Degelis

Highway system
- Quebec provincial highways; Autoroutes; List; Former
← R-293	→ R-296

Route 295 is a 98 km two-lane north–south highway in Quebec, Canada, which starts in Saint-Jean-de-Dieu at the junction of Route 293 and ends in Dégelis at the junction of Autoroute 85.

== List of towns along Route 295 ==
- Saint-Jean-de-Dieu
- Sainte-Rita
- Saint-Guy
- Squatec
- Saint-Michel-du-Squatec
- Lejeune
- Auclair
- Lots Renverses
- Degelis
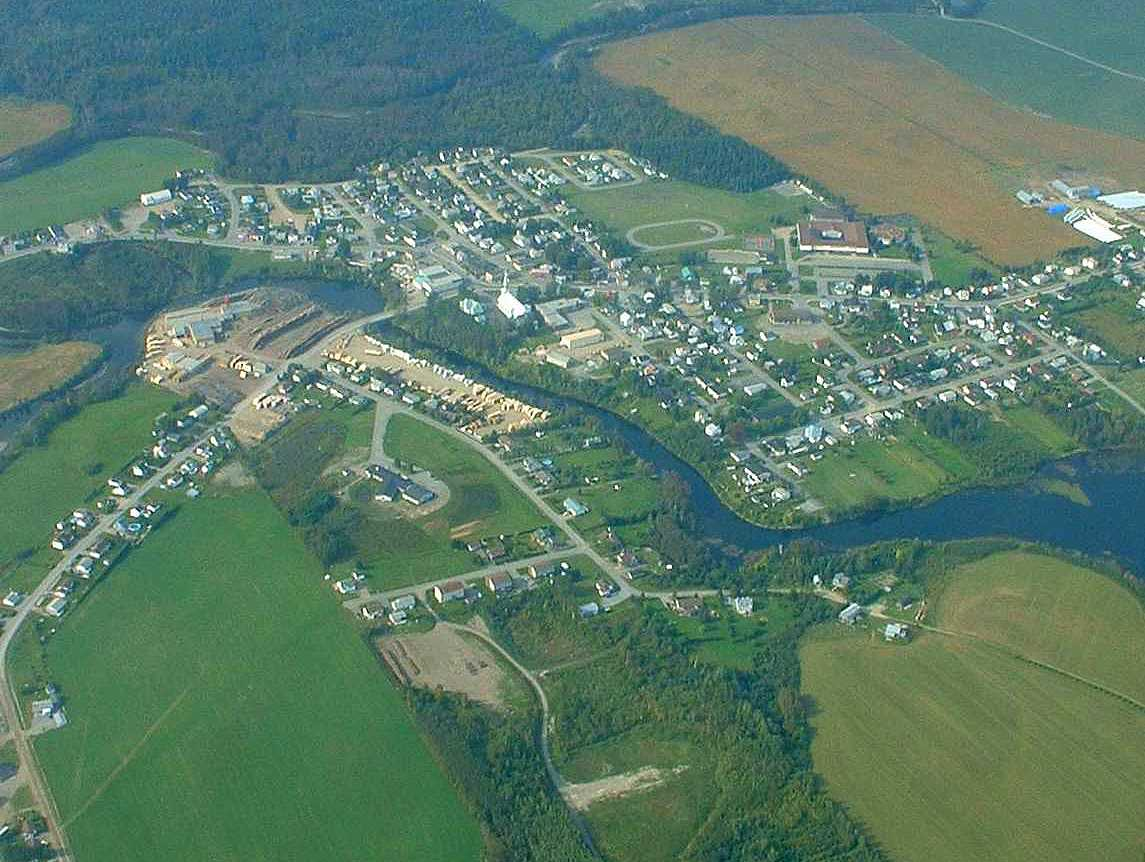
Route 295 passes through Saint-Michel-du-Squatec.

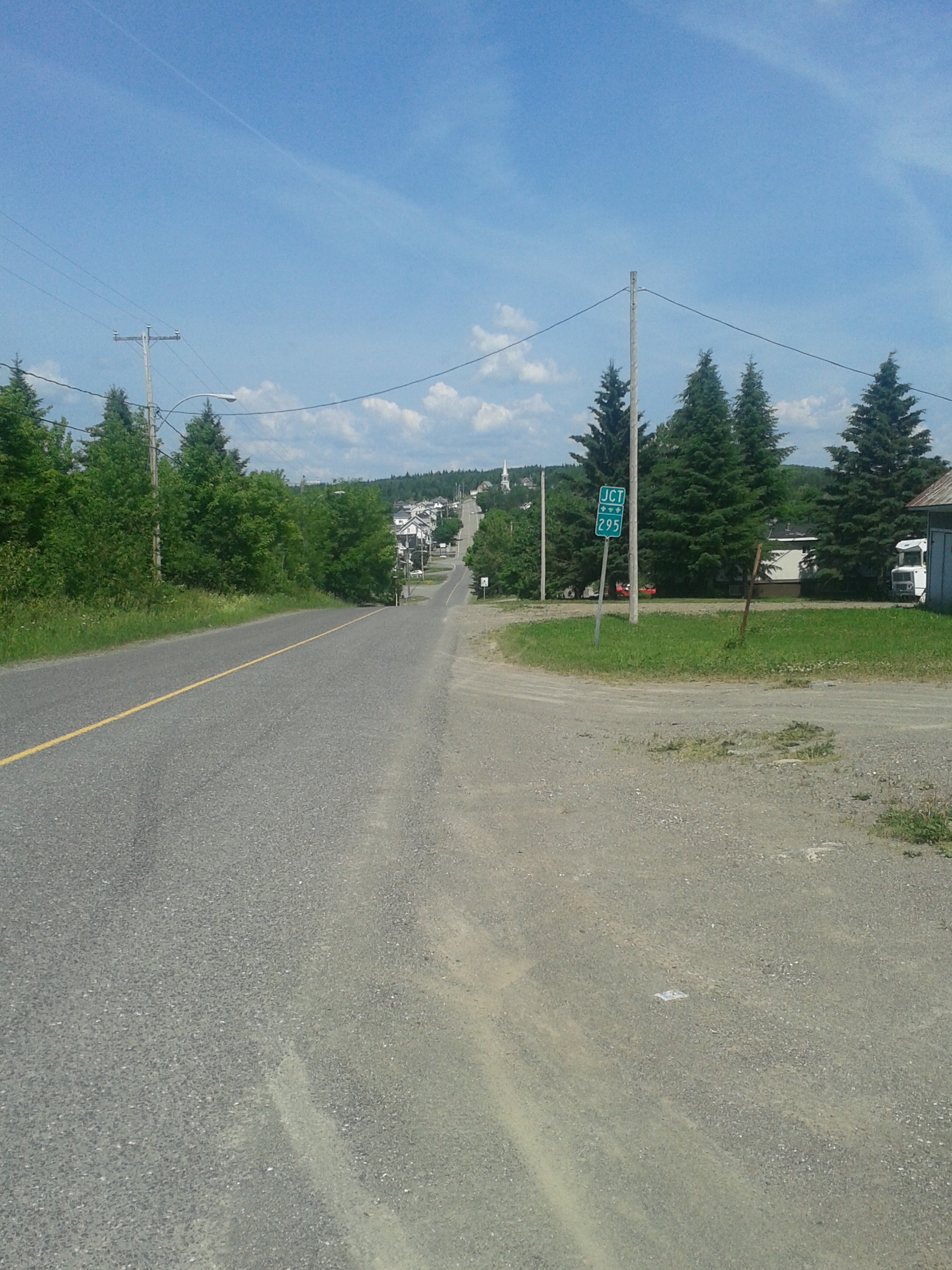
Advance sign for Route 295 junction in Sainte-Rita.

== See also ==
- List of Quebec provincial highways
