= Quebec Route 293 =

Highway in Quebec, Canada

Route 293

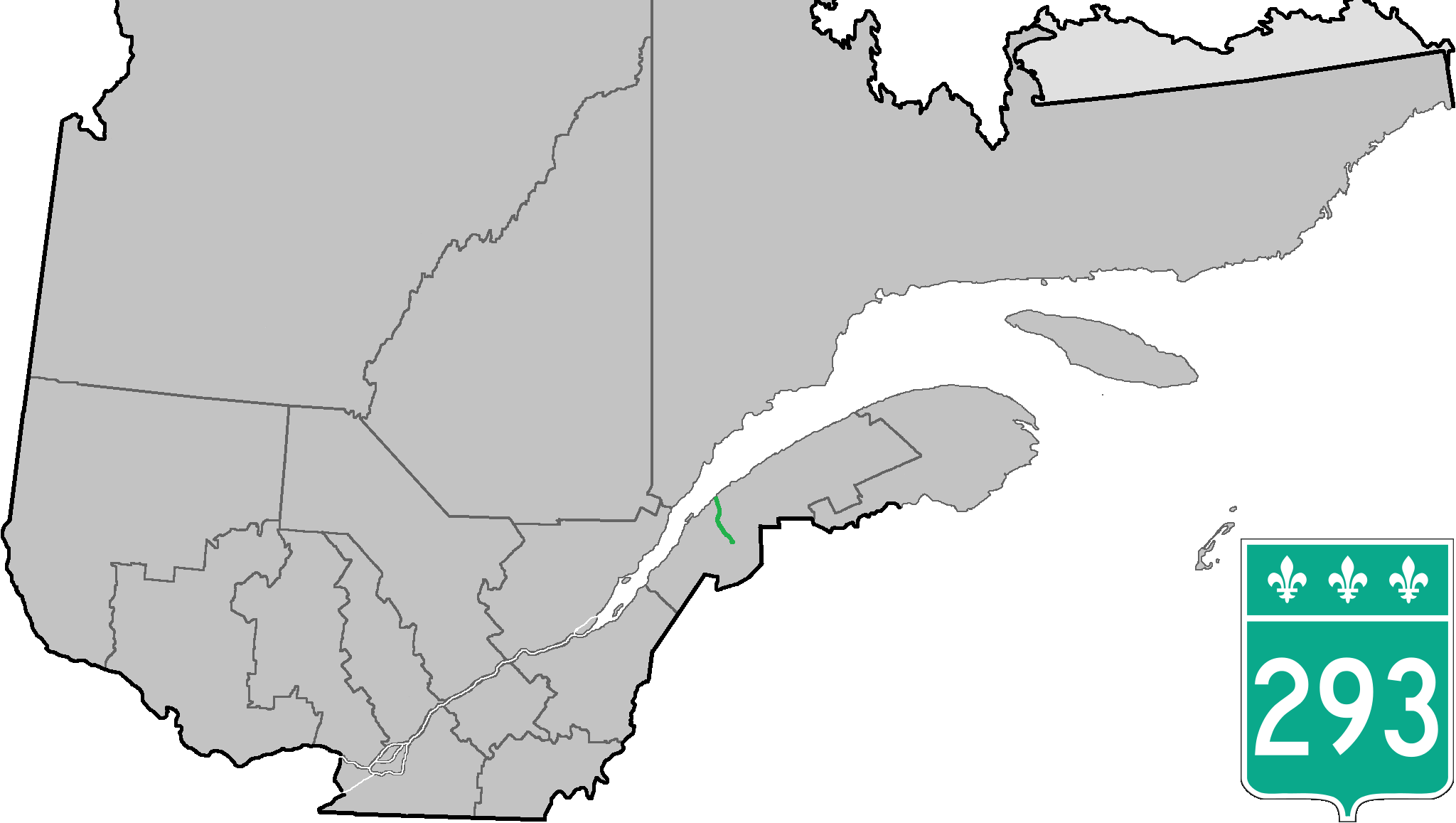

Route information
- Length: 67 km (42 mi)

Major junctions
- South end: R-232 north of Cabano
- R-296 west of Sainte-Francoise; R-295 in Saint-Jean-de-Dieu
- North end: R-132 in Trois-Pistoles

Location
- Country: Canada
- Province: Quebec
- Major cities: Trois-Pistoles

Highway system
- Quebec provincial highways; Autoroutes; List; Former
← R-291	→ R-295

Route 293 is 67 km two-lane north/south highway located in the Bas-Saint-Laurent region of Quebec, Canada. The route starts in Trois-Pistoles at the junction of Route 132 and ends north of Cabano at the junction of Route 232.

== Towns along Route 293 ==
- Trois-Pistoles
- Notre-Dame-des-Neiges
- Saint-Jean-de-Dieu
- Saint-Cyprien

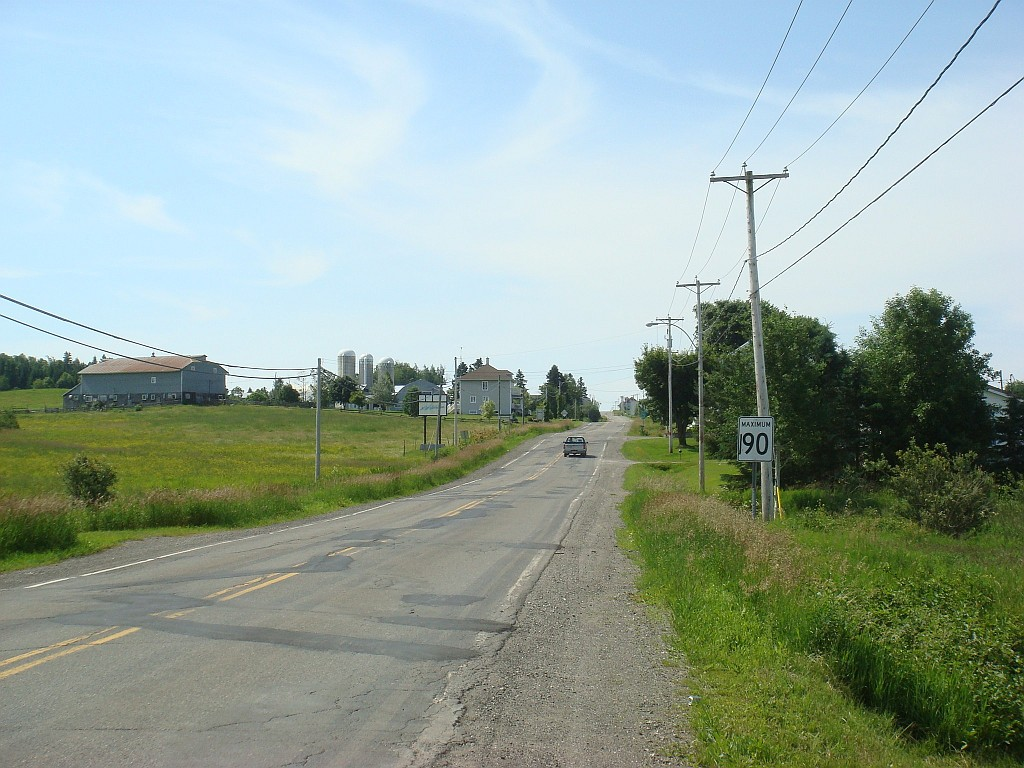
Route 293 at St-Jean-de-Dieu

== See also ==
- List of Quebec provincial highways
