= Montagne du Fourneau =

Mountain located within the Lac-Témiscouata National Park in Quebec, Canada

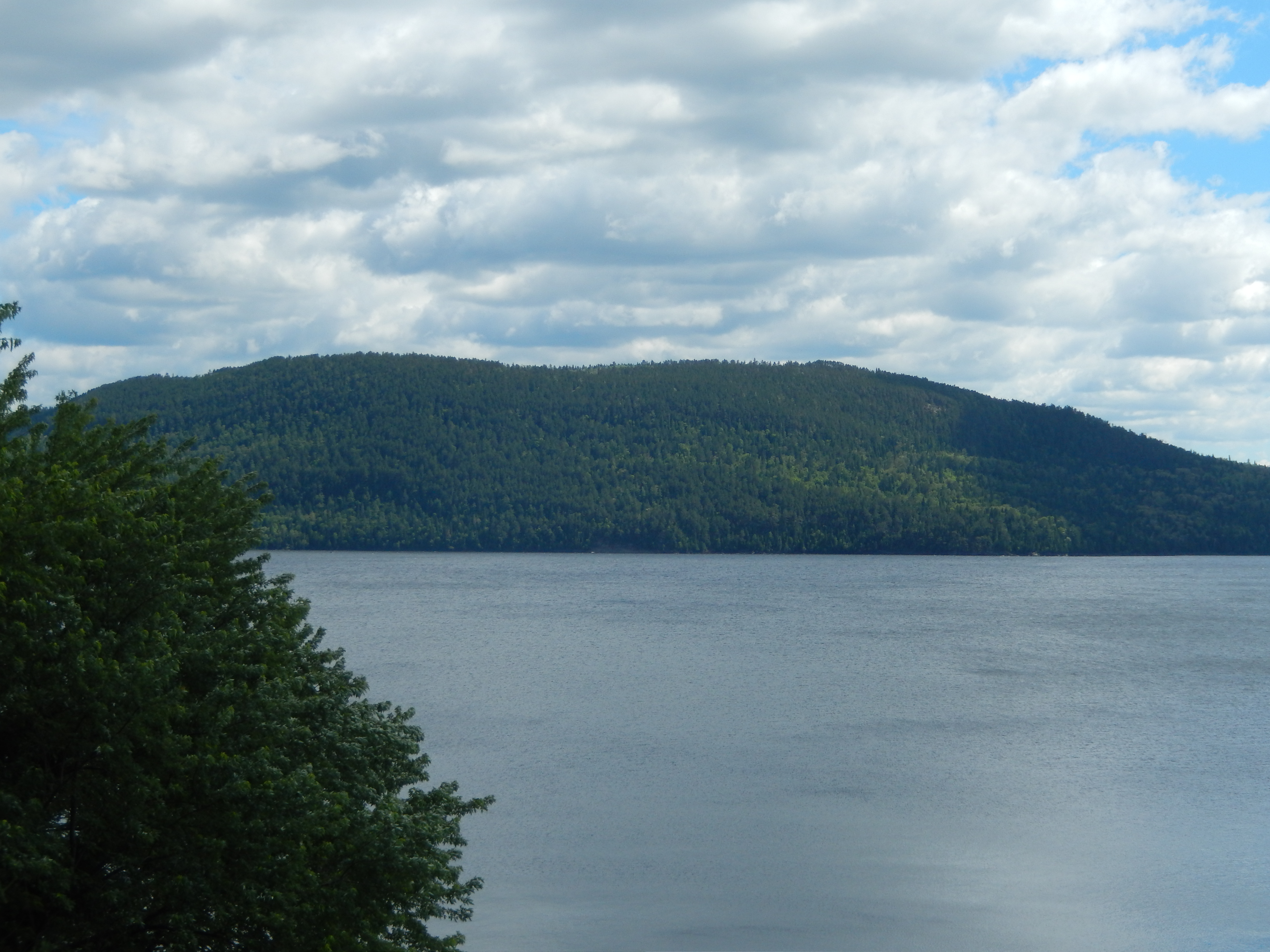
- Montagne du Fourneau seen from Fort Ingall in Cabano.

Highest point
- Elevation: 1,213.91 ft (370.00 m)
- Coordinates: 47°42′34″N 68°52′06″W

Geography
- Location within Canada

- Montagne du Fourneau (Canada)
- Country: Canada
- Region: Bas-Saint-Laurent
- Province: Québec
- Parent range: Notre Dame Mountains (Appalachian Mountains)

Geology
- Mountain type: Mountain
- Rock type(s): Limestone, Sandstone, Mudstone

Montagne du Fourneau is a mountain in the Lac-Témiscouata National Park in Quebec, Canada. It owes its name to the fact that during the first half of the 19th century, the mountain's limestone deposits were used to fuel a lime kiln at Fort Ingall. It was then used as forest land by the owners of the Madawaska Seignory. The unconceded lands of the seigneury were acquired by the Quebec government in 1969.

The mountain is home to a red pine-white pine forest, a forest group that was classified as an exceptional forest ecosystem in 2003 due to its rarity in Eastern Quebec. This rarity is attributable to the low number of forest fires in the region, due to its high humidity. The site is also home to the largest white-tailed deer wintering habitat in the Lower St. Lawrence. It was included in the Lac-Témiscouata National Park when it was created back in 2009.

== Toponymy ==
Kiln Mountain probably owes its name to the presence of a kiln for converting limestone into lime, which was located near Fort Ingall on the opposite shore of the lake. When Fort Ingall was built in 1839, the British used the mountain's limestone to make lime. They used it to make mortar and whitewash the interior and exterior of buildings.

The mountain has also been known as "Mount Lennox", "Mount Wisik" and "Furnace Mountain".

== Geography ==
=== Location ===
Montagne du Fourneau is located in southeastern Quebec, Canada, in the Bas-Saint-Laurent administrative region and the Témiscouata regional county municipality. It lies entirely within the territory of the municipality of Saint-Michel-du-Squatec parish and within Lac-Témiscouata National Park. The mountain is particularly visible from Lake Témiscouata, which forms a right angle with the mountain, as well as from Cabano, just three kilometers from the summit.

=== Topography ===
Montagne du Fourneau, along with Monts Wissick and Montagne des Blocs, form part of a group of ridges aligned with the Squatec-Cabano syncline. They are aligned on a southwest–northeast axis, corresponding to the major Appalachian folding axes. The altitude of these peaks varies from 300 to 380 m, culminating in Montagne du Fourneau and an unnamed summit near Lac Aubert. Montagne du Fourneau is bordered by a 170 m escarpment in contact with Lake Témiscouata.

=== Geology ===
The rocks on the mountain are part of the Late Silurian/Early Devonian Saint-Léon Formation, composed of mudstones and sandstones with laminaria and limestone nodules. This formation is part of the Gaspé belt, which comprises rocks from the same periods that were deformed and metamorphosed during the Acadian orogeny some 400 million years ago. Together with the Robitaille and Lac Croche formations, it also constitutes the Squatec-Cabano syncline. This is delimited to the east and west by two thrust faults that separate the mountain from the older rocks. The positive relief of the syncline is mainly explained by the fact that it is composed of rocks that are more resistant than the surrounding ones.

A large colony of fossilized algae can be found at the bottom of the escarpment cliff.

=== Weather ===
According to Litynski's numerical classification of world climates, the climate on Montagne du Fourneau is subpolar, subhumid, intermediate continental, with insolation below the global average. According to the Notre-Dame-du-Lac weather station (320 m), between 1981 and 2010, the average annual temperature was 3.2 °C, with an average of -13.7 °C in January and 17.9 °C in July. Annual precipitation is 1,000 mm, including 259 cm of snow. The region enjoys an average frost-free season of 122 days. Precipitation in the region is comparable to that of the Notre-Dame Mountains and the south shore of the St. Lawrence River, but it is one of the regions with the lowest annual snowfall in southern Quebec. Average annual insolation is 1,706 hours, a deficit of 348 hours compared to Montreal.

The summit of the mountain is subject to a thermal inversion phenomenon, meaning that during the night, when the sky is clear and the wind light, the ground on the slopes loses its heat by direct radiation into space, causing the cooled air to become denser and sink to the bottom of the valleys. Minimum temperatures here therefore average 1.3 °C, whereas without inversion they would be 1 °C higher.

Notre-Dame-du-Lac, 1981 - 2010
Months	Jan	Feb	Mar	Apr	May	Jun	Jul	Aug	Sept	Oct	Nov	Dec	Year
Average minimum temperatures (°C)	−18,4	−16,2	−10,1	−2,3	4,4	9,8	12,7	11,7	7	1,4	−5	−12,8	−1,5
Average temperatures (°C)	−13,7	−11,4	−5,5	2,3	10	15,3	17,9	16,8	11,7	5,5	−1,7	−9	3,2
Average minimum temperatures (°C)	−9	−6,5	−0,9	6,8	15,6	20,8	23,1	21,9	16,4	9,6	1,6	−5,1	7,9
Precipitation (mm)	77	61,5	60	69,1	90,2	96,9	118,9	95,9	87,2	88,7	83,2	71,4	1000,1
of which snow (cm)	60	49	39	20	3	0	0	0	0	3	33	51	259
Source : Environment and Climate Change Canada

=== Fauna and flora ===
The Témiscouata region is home to 40 species of mammals, 20 of which are found in the park. The most common species are white-tailed deer, moose, snowshoe hare, pine marten, american mink, red fox, coyote, and muskrat. The mountain is entirely included in the Lake Témiscouata white-tailed deer overwintering, the largest in the Lower St. Lawrence region.

The forest on Montagne du Fourneau is part of the yellow birch fir bioclimatic domain, meaning that the regional forest on average should be mainly composed of balsam fir and yellow birch in the terminal successional stage. However, epidemics of spruce budworms, a natural pest, have decimated the firs; the dominant forest at the summit is now made up of poplar and paper birch, intolerant hardwoods. The fir should eventually regain its place as it dominates regeneration. To the south of the mountain is a sugar maple grove.

On the steep western and south-western slopes of the mountain is a red pine-white pine forest, exceptional both for its rarity in eastern Quebec and for its size (207 ha). This is the result of repeated forest fires in this area. It is currently dominated by red pines reaching 18 m in height and 32 cm in diameter. Its origins date back to a fire around 1860. Red pine is accompanied by white pine, black spruce, balsam fir, eastern white-cedar, balsam poplar, and white birch. The shrub layer is composed of Eagle Fern, Lingonberry, and umbellate wintergreen. In the undergrowth, we also find Canadian bunchberry, Linnaea borealis, wild liquorice and Canada may-lily.

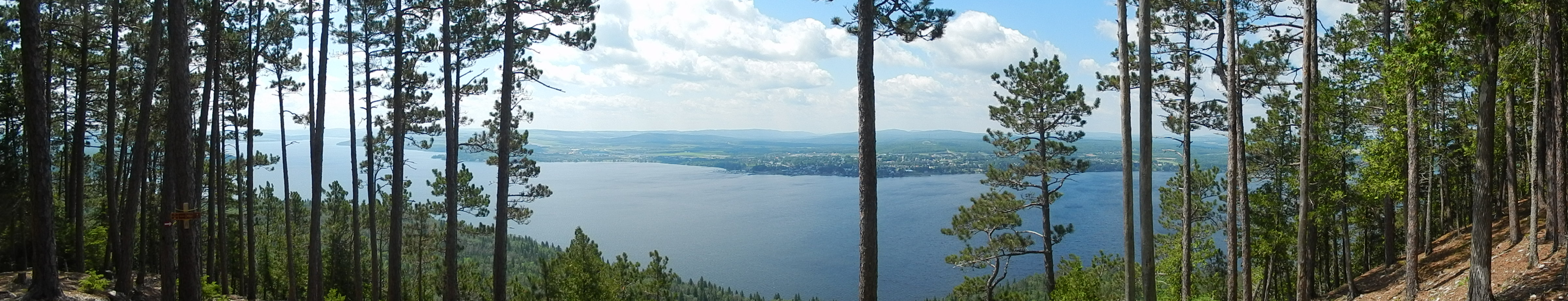
The pine forest and Lake Témiscouata.

The mountain's escarpment and scree slopes are home to the region's only occurrence of a few species: Ivory sedge, Steller's rockbrake, Northern wild comfrey (Cynoglossum virginianum var. boreale), Fragrant woodfern, Jack pine, bog-rosemary, mountain cranberry, oblong woodsia and Glabrous woodsia.

== History ==
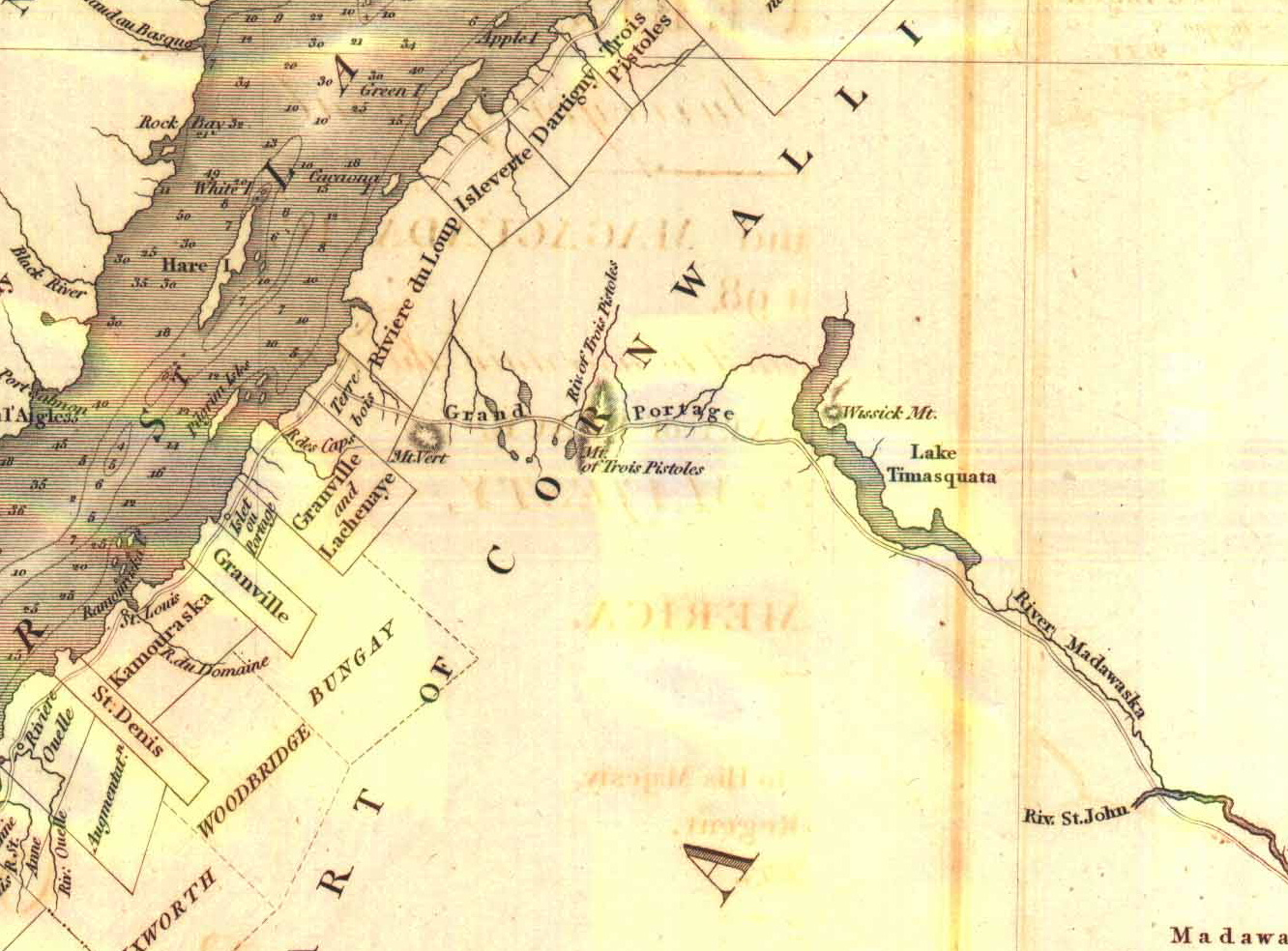
Excerpt from surveyor Samuel Holland's 1813 map of Lower Canada, showing the Témiscouata portage road. Montagne du Fourneau is shown as "Wissick Mountain".

The oldest traces of human occupation in the region date from 9,000 to 9,400 years BC at a Paleoindian archaeological site a few kilometers north of Saint-Michel-du-Squatec. Located on a major traffic route linking the Bay of Fundy to the St. Lawrence River, Lake Témiscouata was known to at least four Amerindian groups: the Maliseet, the Mi'kmaq, the Montagnais and the St. Lawrence Iroquoians. 1,000 years ago, the region was occupied by the Maliseet. Archaeological research shows that the region was frequented on a seasonal basis by highly mobile populations. In the Late Woodland period, between 500 and 1,000 years BC, archaeological evidence suggests that Lake Témiscouata populations maintained trade links with the St. Lawrence Valley and the Bay of Fundy.

The existence of Lake Témiscouata was known to the first French settlers in North America. Samuel de Champlain was informed of the lake's presence as early as 1604, before the founding of Quebec in 1608. The first water route between the St. Lawrence and St. John rivers was via the Rivière des Trois Pistoles, followed by the Rivière Ashberish or Rivière Touladi. Over time, this route was replaced by the Portage du Témiscouata, a road linking Rivière-du-Loup to Cabano. This route became vital, especially in winter, for linking Quebec to Acadia during the French regime, and Quebec to Halifax after the British conquest. The seigneury of Madawaska, where the mountain is located, was granted to Charles Aubert de La Chesnaye in 1685, but the region was never settled under the French regime, being isolated and unsafe.

Settlement of Témiscouata began in the 1850s, mainly on the west side. The construction of the road linking Quebec to New Brunswick in 1860 and the Témiscouata Railway in 1888 boosted the region's demographic and economic development. As for the rest of the Madawaska Seignory, it passed through the hands of several businessmen and forestry companies. In 1911, it was acquired by Fraser Papers. These forestry companies kept large swathes of private land as forest reserves. As a result, the entire eastern part of the lake, with the exception of Saint-Juste-du-Lac, remains untouched by human occupation. Forest exploitation along the Vieille Route (south of the mountain) began in the late 19th century. Lumber camps were set up every two, six, and twelve miles from the Lake Témiscouasta wharf. Each winter, these camps could hold up to a hundred men. In the late 1930s, a telephone line was installed along the Vieille Route to facilitate communications. Until the 1940s, Saint-Michel-du-Squatec was linked to Cabano by the Vieille Route, and the lake was crossed by ferry.

In 1969, the Quebec government acquired the Quebec portions of the former Madawaska Seignory. The purpose of this purchase was to regularize forestry supplies for other forestry companies in the region. Starting in 1996, the government undertook studies to identify potential park sites in the southern part of the province. In the case of the Notre-Dame Mountains, seven sites were analyzed, including Lake Témiscouata. A comparative analysis combined with an aerial survey determined that it was the most representative of its natural region. In 2003, the Regional County Municipality of Témiscouata asked the government to put forward a project for the creation of a national park. Public consultation for the creation of the park took place in June 2008. On November 18, 2009, the government decreed the creation of the Lac-Témiscouata National Park.

== Activities ==
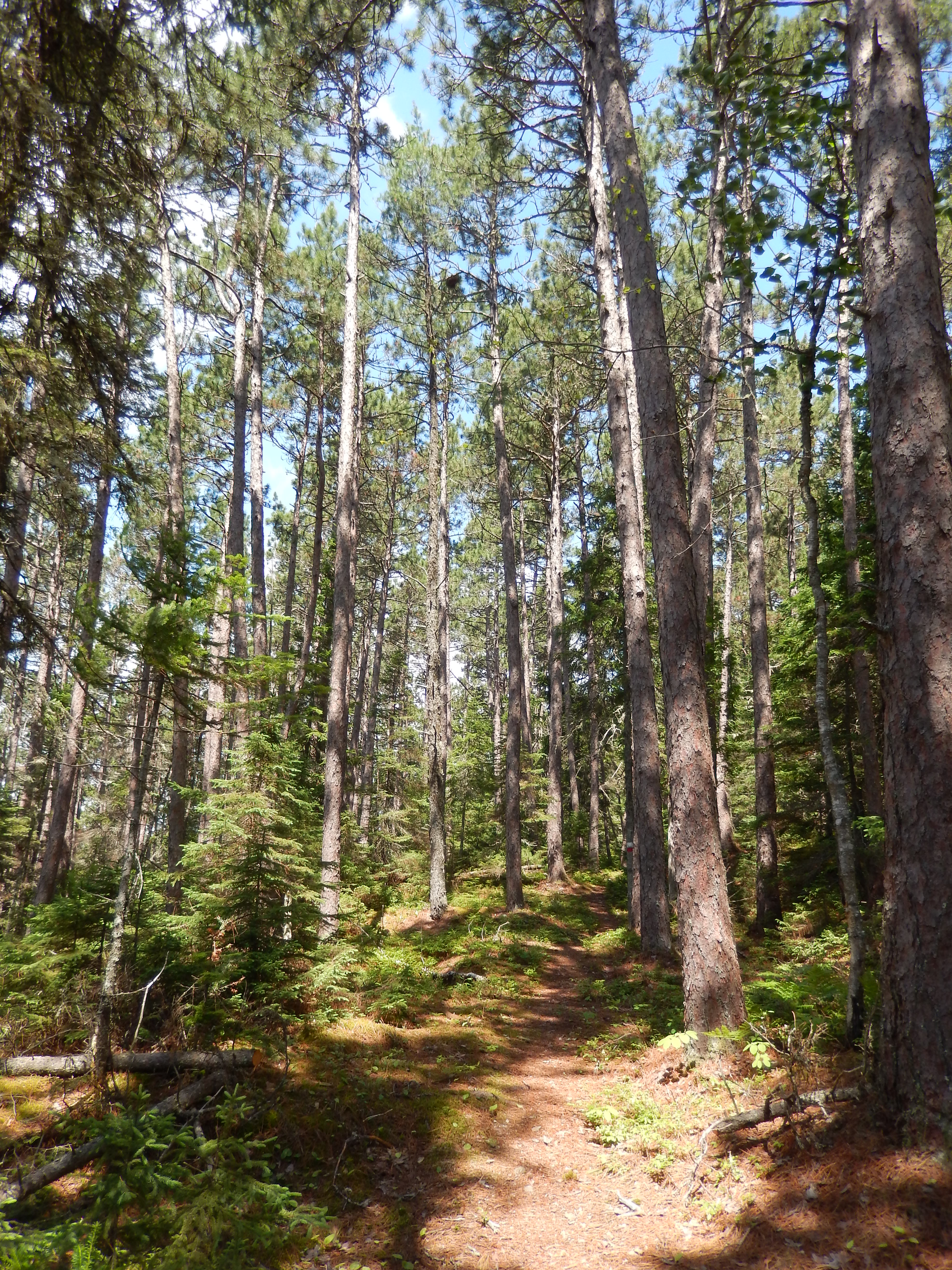
Red pine forest at the top of the mountain.

=== Environmental protection ===
Montagne du Fourneau is located completely within the Lac-Témiscouata National Park, a 176.5 km^{2} provincial park created in 2009 with the mission of protecting the characteristic landscapes of the Monts Notre-Dame natural region. Since 2003, the mountain's western flank has also been protected by the Montagne-à-Fourneau rare forest, an exceptional 207-hectare forest ecosystem, with the aim of protecting a forest of red pines accompanied by white pines, a very rare forest stand in eastern Quebec made possible by high humidity and an absence of forest fires. The southeastern part of the mountain is also part of a 394.2 ha biological refuge created in 2003 to protect old-growth forests from the forestry industry.

=== Hiking ===
The summit of the mountain is accessible via the Montagne-du-Fourneau trail, a 5.5 km-long loop that begins at the national park's discovery and service center. This trail allows viewers to explore the pine forest, classified as an exceptional forest ecosystem, and offers views of the lake and Cabano.

The mountain is also on the route of a long-distance hiking trail, the Montagne du Fourneau section of the national trail, whose Bas-Saint-Laurent section links Trois-Pistoles to Dégelis via the national park. The 9.6 km section is accessible from the Sutherland Trail and the Discovery and Service Centre. Huts are located at the ends of the trail, at Cascades Sutherland and Curé-Cyr beach. The trail can also be explored in winter on snowshoes.

== Appendix ==
=== Related articles ===
- Lac-Témiscouata National Park
- fr:Forêt rare de la Montagne-à-Fourneau

=== Bibliography ===
- ^{(fr) [PDF]} Émilie Devoe, "Les fours à chaux du Bas-Saint-Laurent", L'Estuaire, no 64, June 2004, p. 32-38 (ISSN 1484-6969, read online archive)
- ^{(fr)} Alain Tardif, Lac Témiscouata: Parc grandeur nature, Témiscouata-sur-le-Lac, Alain Tardif communication visuelle, 2014, 159 p. (ISBN 978-2-9809325-9-5, online archive)
- ^{(fr)} Isabelle Tessier, Parc national du Lac-Témiscouata: États des connaissances, Ministère du Développement durable, de l'Environnement et des Parcs, 2008, 225 p. (ISBN 978-2-550-52191-4, read online archive)
