= Témiscouata =

Témiscouata could refer to:

- Rimouski (federal electoral district), federal electoral district
- Témiscouata (federal electoral district), federal electoral district
- Témiscouata (provincial electoral district), provincial electoral district
- Lac-Témiscouata National Park, park
- Lake Témiscouata, lake in Quebec
- Rimouski-Neigette—Témiscouata—Les Basques, electoral district
- Témiscouata Regional County Municipality, regional municipality
- Kamouraska—Rivière-du-Loup—Témiscouata—Les Basques, former electoral district
- Témiscouata-sur-le-Lac, municipality
  - Saint-Honoré-de-Témiscouata, municipality
- Kamouraska-Témiscouata, former provincial electoral district
- Témiscouata-sur-le-Lac Water Aerodrome,
- Rivière-du-Loup–Témiscouata, provincial electoral district
- Saint-Elzéar-de-Témiscouata, municipality
