= Little Iroquois River =

Location
- Country: Canada
- Province: New Brunswick
- County of New Brunswick: Madawaska County

Physical characteristics
- Source
  - location: Madawaska County, New Brunswick
  - coordinates: 47°37′22″N 68°19′59″W
  - elevation: 394 m (1,293 ft)
- Mouth
  - location: Iroquois River (Saint John River)
  - coordinates: 47°28′12″N 68°21′40″W
  - elevation: 171 m (561 ft)
- Length: 20.3 km (12.6 mi)

The Little Iroquois River is a tributary of the Iroquois River (Saint John River), flowing in Notre Dame Mountains, the Madawaska County, in Northwest of New Brunswick, in Canada.

"Little Iroquois River" is flowing to the south in forest area, along the border between Quebec and New Brunswick. This course is more or less in parallel on the east side of the Iroquois River (Saint John River) and the west side of the Green River (Saint John River).

The "Little Iroquois River" flows into the Iroquois River (Saint John River) which generally flows south and empties on the north shore of Saint John River (Bay of Fundy). It flows southeast and flows on the north bank of the Bay of Fundy which opens to the southwest on the Atlantic Ocean.

== Geography ==
=== Course of the river ===
"Little Iroquois River" originates from a mountain stream (altitude: 394 metres (1,293 ft)), located in the Madawaska County, in New Brunswick.

This source is located at:

- 3.4 kilometres (2.1 mi) southwest of the "First Lake" which is the first head of the lake of Green River (Saint John River) whose hydrographic slope begins at Sixth Lake in MRC Témiscouata at Quebec;
- 3.5 kilometres (2.2 mi) east of the border between Quebec and New Brunswick;
- 27.1 kilometres (16.8 mi) northeast of the city center of Edmundston, in New Brunswick;
- 23.1 kilometres (14.4 mi) northeast of the village center of Dégelis, in Quebec.

From its source, "Little Iroquois River" flows over 20.3 kilometres (12.6 mi), as follow:

- 5.2 kilometres (3.2 mi) to the south, up to the bridge of the forest road;
- 5.3 kilometres (3.3 mi) to the southwest, up to the bridge of a forest road;
- 9.8 kilometres (6.1 mi) to the south, passing in the row of Bossé, in the Madawaska County, up to the confluence of the river

The "Little Iroquois River" flows on the east bank of the Iroquois River (Saint John River). This confluence is located:

- 20.0 kilometres (12.4 mi) upstream of the confluence of the Iroquois River (Saint John River);
- 4.8 kilometres (3.0 mi) northeast from the village of Saint-Jacques Parish, New Brunswick;
- 10.5 kilometres (6.5 mi) north of the city of Edmundston.

== Toponymy ==
The place name "Little Iroquois River" derived from its tributary is the "Iroquois River."

== See also ==
Media related to Category: Little Iroquois River at Wikimedia Commons

- Madawaska County, in New Brunswick
- Iroquois River (Saint John River), a stream of New Brunswick
- List of rivers of New Brunswick
