= Lac-Témiscouata National Park =

National park in Quebec, Canada

- IUCN category II (national park)
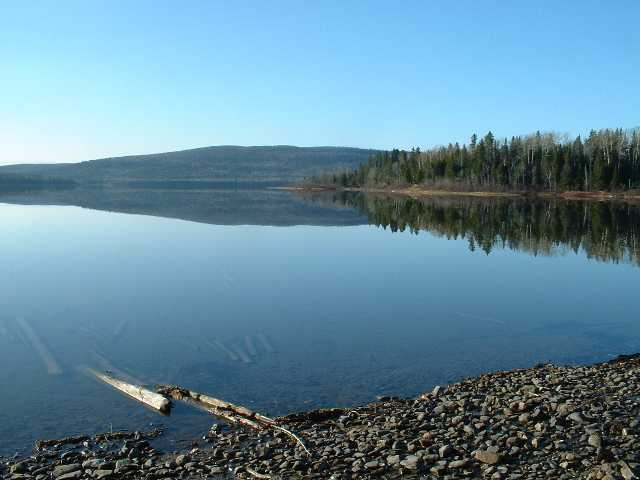
- View of the Grand lac Touladi

- Location within Quebec Location within Canada
- Interactive map of Lac-Témiscouata National Park
- Location: Témiscouata, Quebec, Canada
- Nearest city: Témiscouata-sur-le-Lac
- Coordinates: 47°38′36″N 68°51′23″W
- Area: 175 km^{2} (68 sq mi)
- Established: November 18th, 2009
- Governing body: Société des établissements de plein air du Québec
- Website: www.sepaq.com/pq/tem/

Lac-Témiscouata National Park (French: Parc national du Lac-Témiscouata, pronounced [paʁk nɑsjɔnal dy lak temiskwata]) is a provincial park located in Quebec, Canada south of the Saint Lawrence River, near the border with New Brunswick.

This national park, created on November 18, 2009, is divided into two parts, one to the northeast of Lake Témiscouata (157.2 km2, including the Squatec and Saint-Juste sectors) and the other to the southeast (18.1 km2, Dégelis sector). The park's physical and ecological characteristics make it representative of the Monts Notre-Dame natural region (21,720 km2), the only natural region in southern Quebec not yet represented by a national park at the time of its creation. As well as bordering Lake Témiscouata, one of the most beautiful in the region, this territory includes several smaller lakes and is crossed by a major canoeable river, the Touladi, where dwarf whitefish can be found. In terms of wildlife, the park is home to the largest white-tailed deer population in the Lower St. Lawrence. Finally, in terms of culture, the park boasts a high concentration of Amerindian archaeological sites, among the oldest in Quebec. Grey Owl also lived here for almost 2 years.

== Geography ==
Lac Témiscouata National Park is located on the eastern shore of Lake Témiscouata, in the Lower St. Lawrence region. The park's territory includes the municipalities of Saint-Michel-du-Squatec and Saint-Juste-du-Lac, the towns of Dégelis and Témiscouata-sur-le-Lac in the Témiscouata regional county municipality (RCM), and the municipality of Saint-Cyprien in the Rivière-du-Loup RCM. The park is divided into four sectors covering a total area of 176.5 km^{2}.

=== Geology ===
The rocks in the park are part of the Appalachians. They lie at the boundary between the Taconic and Acadian orogenies. The Taconic Orogeny occurred when the Iapetus Ocean subducted beneath the Laurentia continent during the Ordovician Period, some 460 million years ago. This chain was narrow and low-lying at Quebec level, and even remained underwater in places. During the Devonian, 400 million years ago, Laurentia collided with several microcontinents, creating the Acadian chain, which was superimposed on the Taconian chain. The rocks in the park range in age from Cambrian to Devonian, and are composed mainly of limestone and sandstone.

Near Lac Croche, a karstic topography is developing. These include a loss, sinkholes and a resurgence. There's also the trou des Perdus, a 250 m^{3} long cave.

Like most of Quebec, the region was covered by the Laurentide Ice Sheet during the Wisconsin glaciation, between 80,000 and 12,000 BC. 14,000 years ago, this ice sheet split in two at the level of the St. Lawrence River, forming the Appalachian Ice Cap. This took 2,000 years to melt. The glaciers left deposits of tillite 25 cm to one metre thick, helping to flatten the land and deepen the valleys. Deglaciation left fluvioglacial deposits and a small esker to the northwest of the park. Valleys below 195 m were covered by Lake Madawaska, a large glacial lake that extended as far as Grand Falls, New Brunswick. The lake drained around 8,000 years ago, leaving rhythmites and varves composed of clayey silt.

=== Relief ===
Although the park is located in the Notre-Dame Mountains, its altitude is relatively low. The park's lowest point is Lake Témiscouata, at 149 m, and its highest point is Montagne du Fourneau (380 m). In the Grande Baie sector, the summit rises 360 m above the lake. The Touladi River valley has an average altitude of 160 m.

=== Hydrography ===
The park's territory is criss-crossed by numerous waterways and bodies of water. The main one, and the one that gives the park its name, Lake Témiscouata, extends over a length of 38.9 km and a maximum width of 3 km. Of its 104 km of shoreline, 45%, or 47.2 km, are included within the park's boundaries, as is a 200 m strip of the lake along these shores. Only one island, Île Notre-Dame, is included in the park.

Including Lake Témiscouata, there are 19 bodies of water in the park, with a total surface area of 84 ha. The main bodies of water are, in descending order of surface area, Lake Témiscouata, Grand lac Touladi, Petit lac Touladi, Lac Rond, Lac Croche and Lac à Foin. In the northwestern part of Grand lac Touladi, there is a large marsh covering 23 ha.

The territory is also criss-crossed by 14 streams, including Sutherland Creek, whose discharge cascades down the Squatec-Cabano syncline in an impressive waterfall. Only two rivers cross the park, the Touladi and Ashberish.

The park's hydrographic network is lattice-like, with streams running through the Appalachian fold and occupying geological fracture zones. The entire hydrographic system is part of the Madawaska River watershed. This basin is divided into 27 secondary basins, 9 of which are located within the park. The main ones are the Lake Témiscouata basin, the Touladi River basin and the Sutherland Brook basin.

== Natural environment ==
=== Flora ===
The forest occupies 93% of the park's territory and falls within the yellow birch fir bioclimatic domain. Seven ecological types are found in the park: yellow birch fir stand, yellow birch maple stand, peat bog fir stand, cedar fir stand, yellow birch-beech maple stand, red spruce fir stand and sphagnum black spruce stand. At the end of the plant succession, just over 70% of the territory should be covered by balsam fir and yellow birch groups. However, as a result of intensive forest management and spruce budworm epidemics in the years preceding protection of the territory, this stand covers only 2.8% of the territory.

There are more than 23 different types of forest stands in the park. Softwood poplar stands cover 32.2% of the park, followed by poplar stands (20.7%) and softwood poplar stands (12.9%). Maple groves cover 8.5% of the area. Softwood cedar stands and cedar stands are the most common softwood stands (9.8 & % of the area). Balsam fir, spruce, tamarack and pine cover only 2.1% of the territory. The two pine forests found in the park are the white pine forest of Pointe aux Pins and the exceptional forest ecosystem of Montagne du Fourneau, a red pine forest.

The territory includes rare peat bogs and a few marshes and swamps with well-developed palustrine vegetation. These include water lily meadows and lake bulrush marshes.

Despite the high level of logging in the park prior to its creation, only 13.4% of the forests are less than 40 years old. The majority of forests, 58%, are 40 to 80 years old. Finally, 12% of forests are over 80 years old.

In terms of vascular flora, the park's territory includes 397 taxa, according to the most recently completed inventory. The territory belongs to the boreal domain, since 57.8% of taxa have a range corresponding to the boreal coniferous forest. However, 38.9% of taxa belong to the temperate domain, reflecting the milder climate characteristic of the park's valleys. A total of 33 taxa are recognized as locally rare, and five are likely to be designated as threatened or vulnerable in Quebec. These are the bulbous calypso, Leiberg's nymphea, Andromeda pterospora, Clinton's scripe and bog valerian.

=== Fauna ===
The park is home to 40 species of mammal, of which some 20 have been confirmed. Ungulates include moose (Alces alces) and white-tailed deer (Odocoilus virginiensis). Carnivores include the coyote (Canis latrans), which has only been present in the region since 1971. The wolf was present in the region but disappeared in the late 1800s. Other predators include red fox (Vulpes vulpes), black bear (Ursus américanus), ermine (Mustela herminea), American mink (Neovison vison), American marten (Martes americana), fisher (Martes pennanti), river otter (Lontra canadensis) and Canadian lynx (Lynx canadensis). Small mammals include the Snowshoe Hare (Lepus americanus), Red Squirrel (Tamiasciurus hudsonicus), Striped Chipmunk (Tamias striatus), Northern Flying Squirrel (Glaucomys volans), Canadian Beaver (Castor canadensis), Muskrat (Ondatra zibethicus) and American Porcupine (Erethizon dorsatum).

There are 20 species of fish in the park's various water bodies. Salmonids include lake whitefish, lake trout and brook trout. There are also species of cyprin and sucker, as well as yellow perch and stickleback. In fact, a particular form of three-spined stickleback can be found in water bodies where fishing is prohibited. This form has reduced pelvic bone plates due to the absence of predators.

Several amphibians have been recorded in the area, including the bullfrog, the northern frog, the wood frog. The garter snake is present. The territory is also potentially home to the four-toed salamander.

In terms of bird life, passerines account for half of the species recorded. There are several species of thrush, flycatcher, warbler and sparrow. There are also several birds of prey: osprey, bald eagle, northern harrier, red-tailed hawk, common buzzard and American kestrel.

== Appendix ==
=== Related articles ===
- Lake Témiscouata
- Saint-Michel-du-Squatec
- Touladi River, a watercourse
- fr:Rivière Ashberish, a watercourse
- Montagne du Fourneau

=== Bibliography ===
- Geography resources: Quebec Place Names Database Canada Place Names Database World Database on Protected Areas
