= Fort Ingall =

- Témiscouata-sur-le-Lac, Quebec, Canada
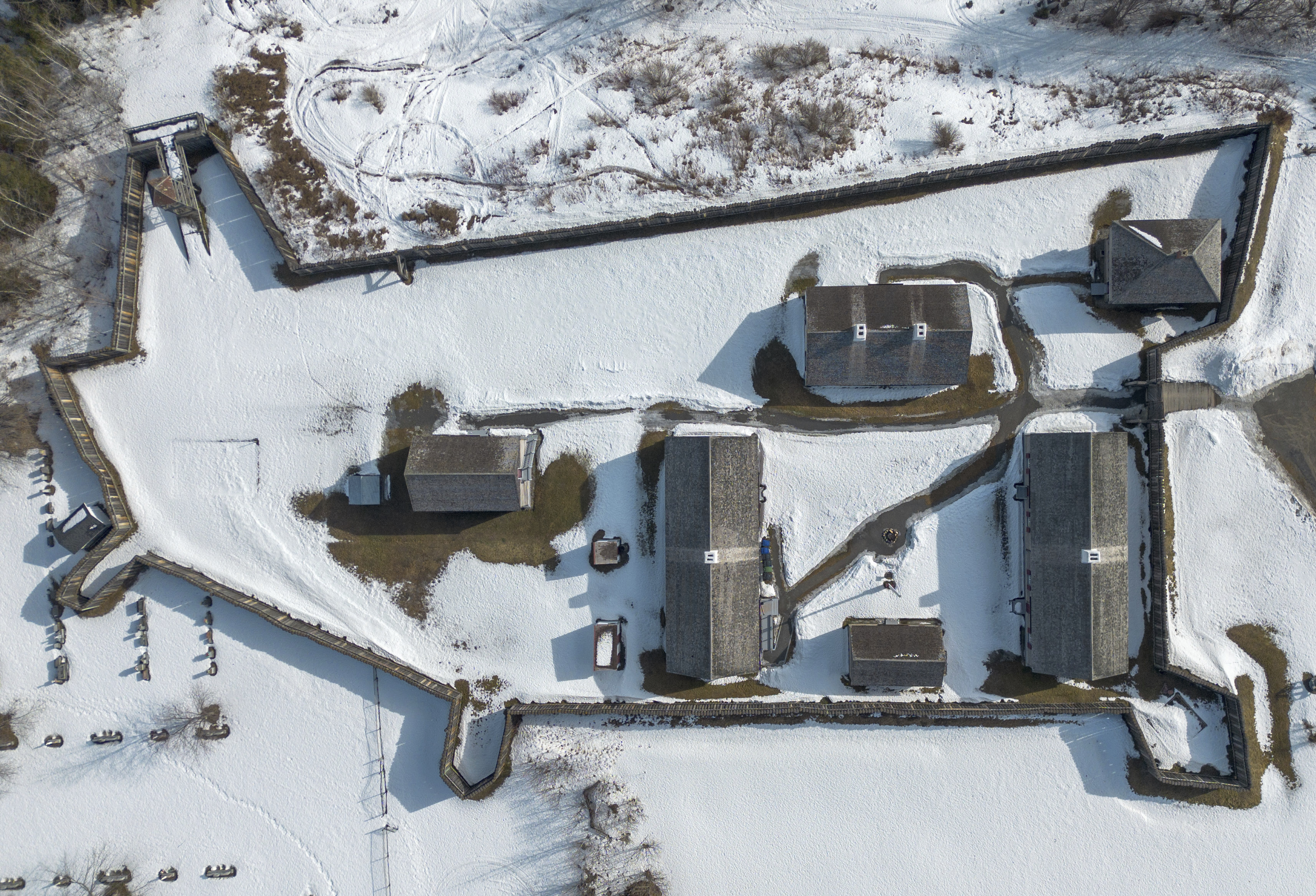
- Fort Ingall in 2026

Site information
- Type: fieldwork
- Code: CkEf-4
- Owner: Historical and Archeological Society of Temiscouata
- Condition: Restored (1970's)

Location
- Location of Fort Ingall
- Coordinates: 47°41′28″N 68°54′03″W

Site history
- Built: 1839–1841
- In use: 1839–1842
- Demolished: 1890
- Battles/wars: Aroostook War

Garrison information
- Past commanders: Frederick Lennox Ingall
- Garrison: 24th, 11th, 56th and 68th regiments
- Designations: classified heritage site (2012–)

Fort Ingall was originally a British fieldwork built in Cabano (now in Témiscouata-sur-le-Lac), Quebec, Canada, in 1839 for the Aroostook War between British North America and the United States.

The site now features a reconstructed 19th-century fort museum containing exhibits about the fort's history and the Aroostook War, as well as artifacts recovered from the site. In season, guided tours demonstrate the soldiers' lives during that time.

== History ==
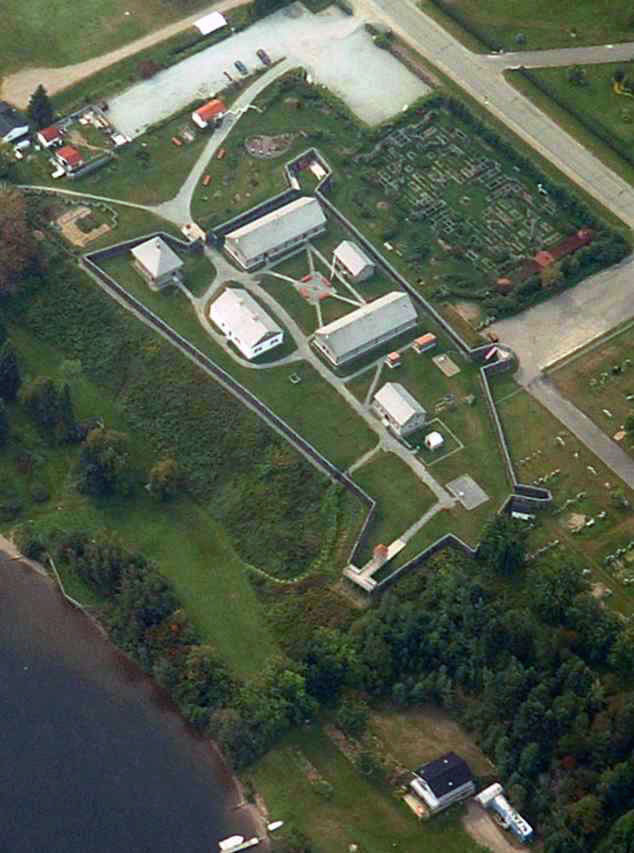
Summer 2003 at Fort Ingall.

In 1839 Lieutenant Frederick Lenox Ingall was ordered to build a fieldwork on the Lake Temiscouata. In the summer, three barracks, one for the officers, and two for the men were erected near the lake, at the end of the road from Rivière-du-Loup. A small detachment of the 24th Regiment of Foot arrived in the summer. The detachment consisted of only 12 men with their 6 wives and 11 children. In the following years, the original small fieldwork became a fortified fort of 12 barracks surrounded by a 12-foot stockade. Three other regiments occupied the Fort between 1839 and 1841, the 11th, the 56th, and the 68th Regiments of Foot, with a maximum occupation of 200 men.

In 1842m the Webster–Ashburton Treaty settled the boundary, thereby ending the war.

According to local oral tradition, the fort was demolished by the first inhabitants of Cabano in the 1900s, who used the large wood logs to build their houses. By the 1920s, nothing remained of the fort.

By the 1950s Fort Ingall was almost forgotten and relegated to legend until the archaeological excavations of the 1960s. These excavations, conducted in 1967 and 1968 by the Société historique de Cabano, confirmed the location of the fort. Excavations uncovered the foundations of several buildings, including the kitchen, officers' dormitory, powder magazine, and sections of the palisade, along with various artifacts such as porcelain, bottles, clay pipes, and military insignias.

In 1972, the fort was reconstructed to its original dimensions using 19th-century construction techniques, funded by a $1 million grant from the Quebec Ministry of Cultural Affairs. The first phase of reconstruction focused on rebuilding the dormitories, while a second phase in 1977 saw the construction of the blockhouse and latrines.

However, in 1980, funding for further reconstruction was denied, leaving six additional buildings unreconstructed. The fort is now owned by a non-profit organization, the Historical and Archeological Society of Temiscouata, which continues to manage the site.

=== Cultural and recreational role ===
Despite the halt in reconstruction, Fort Ingall continued to serve as a cultural site. In the 1980s and the 1990s, initiatives such as the creation of the Café de l'Adjudant and the Témiscouata Roseraie (the second-largest rose garden in Quebec) added cultural value to the site. The rose garden symbolized peace and the non-violent resolution of the Aroostook War.

The fort also became a hub for historical reenactments and educational activities, including the formation of the Garrison of Lake Témiscouata in 2007, which brought military reenactments and educational programs to the fort.

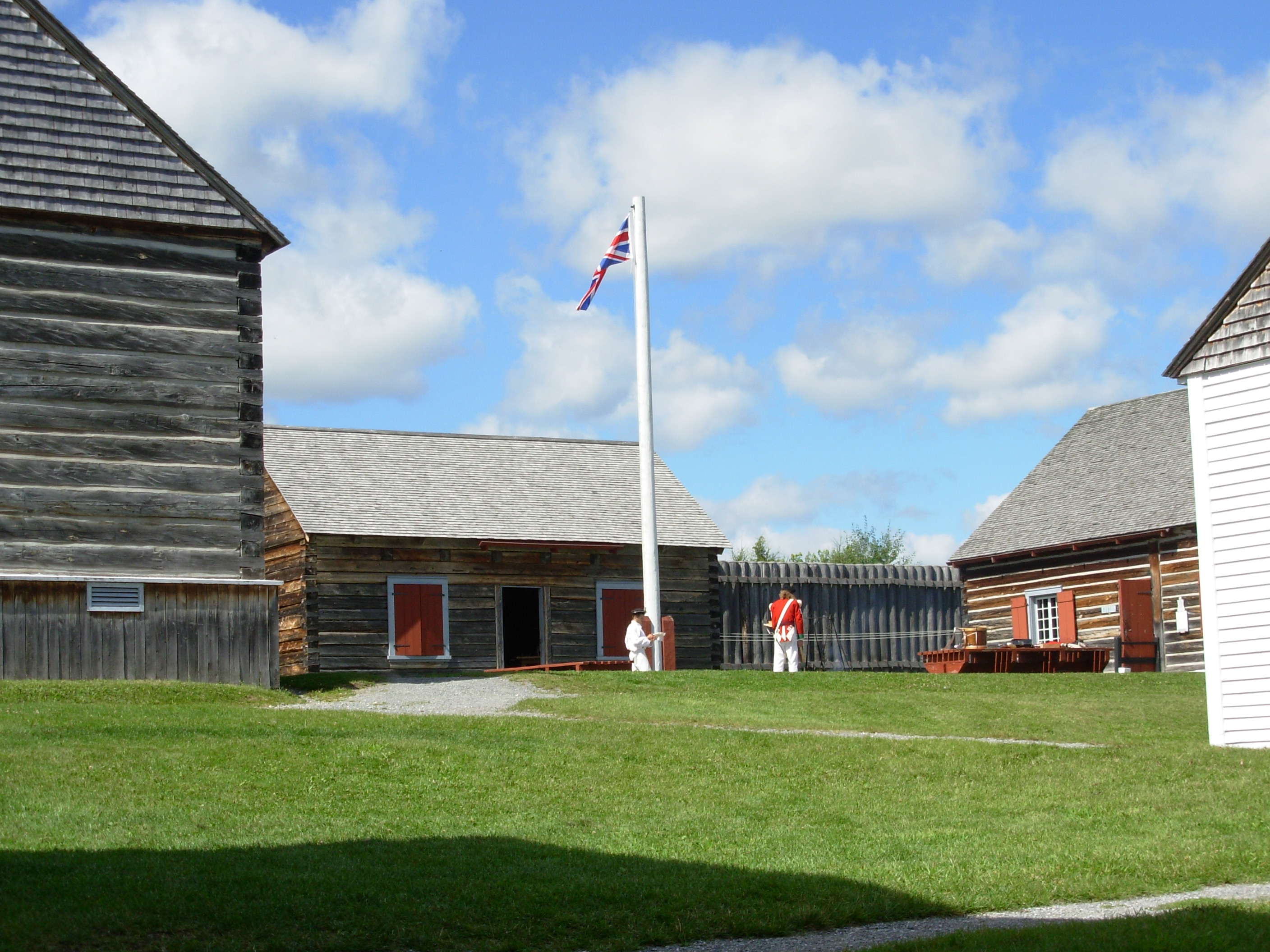
Different buildings at Fort Ingall in the summer of 2007

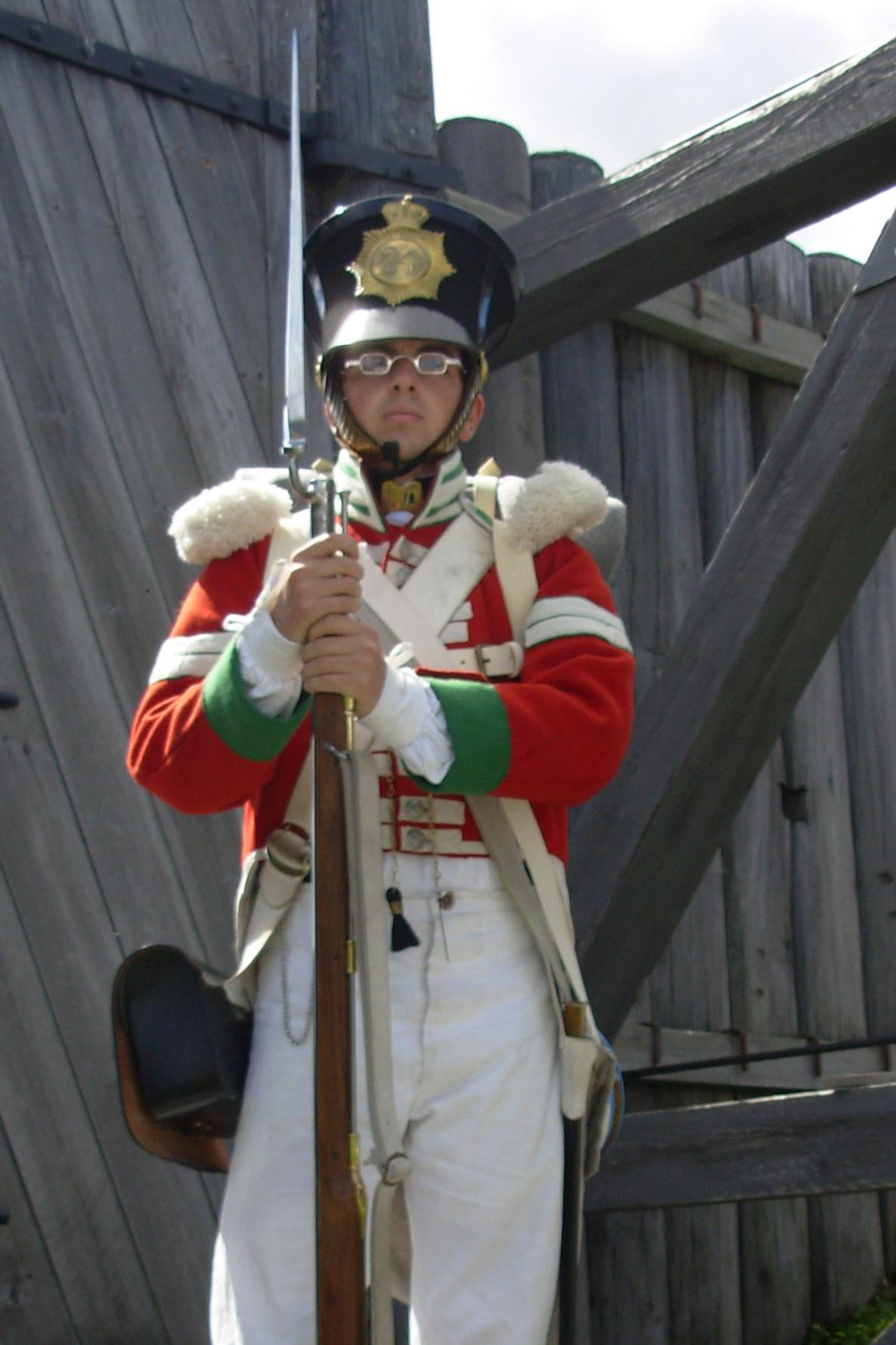
A Corporal of the 24th Regiment of Foot in ceremonial dress stands in front of the gate of Fort Ingall (reenactment).

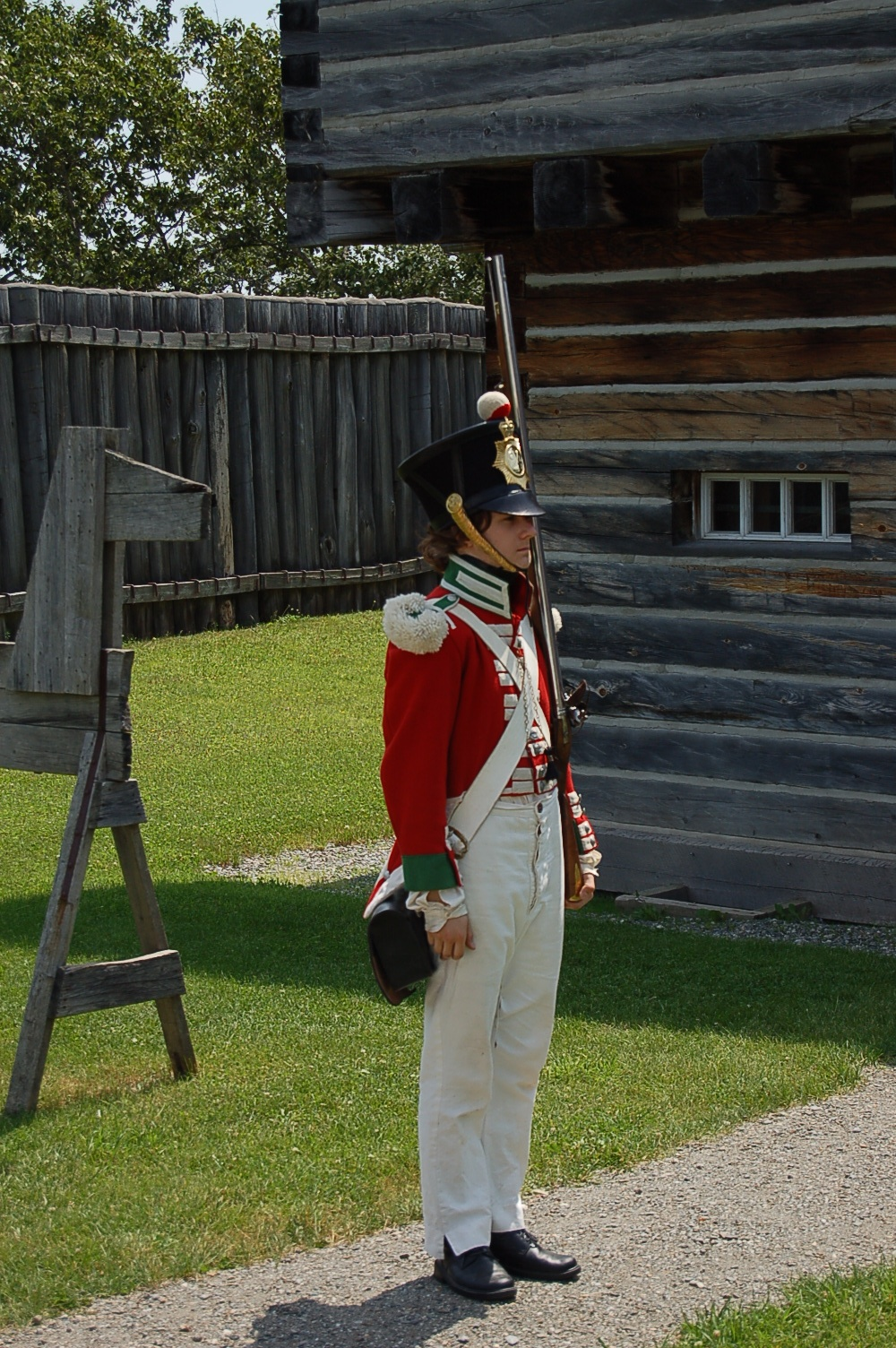
Private of the 24th Regiment of Foot (reenactment).

=== Modern recognition ===
In 2012, Fort Ingall was classified as a Monument historique du patrimoine québécois, the highest recognition for a heritage site in Quebec. The fort has since received multiple awards and continues to attract over 10,000 visitors annually. In 2023, a bilingual audio guide was introduced to enhance the visitor experience.

== See also ==
- List of forts
