= Madawaska Seignory =

Coordinates: 47.7000°N 68.7000°W

Madawaska Seignory (Quebec)

The Madawaska Seignory (French: seigneurie de Madawaska) was a seignory during the French colonisation of New France. It was located in present-day Témiscouata Regional County Municipality in Bas-Saint-Laurent.

== Name ==
An order dated August 18, 1708 mentioned the name "seigneurie de Madaouska" for this seignory.

== History ==
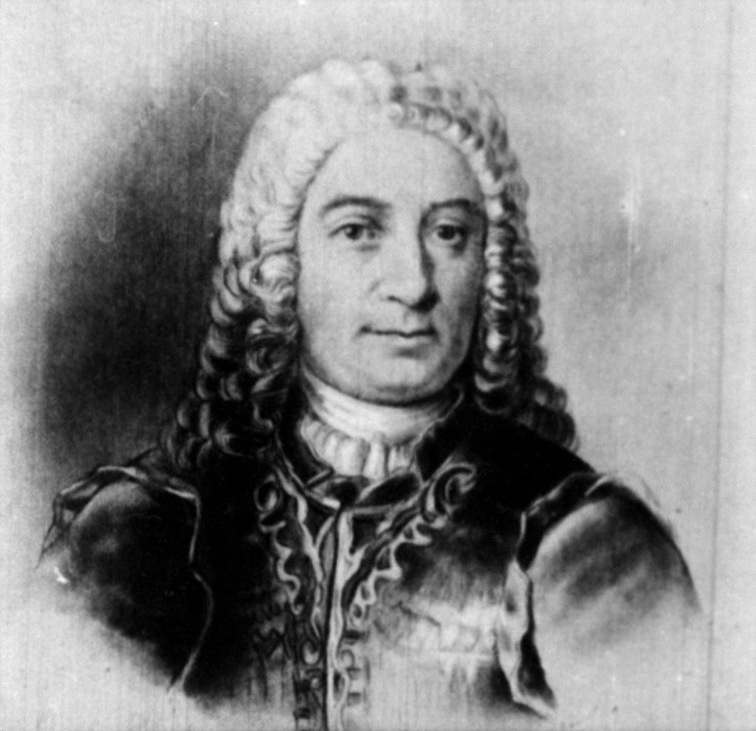
Charles Aubert de La Chesnaye, first seignor of Madawaska

The Madawaska Seignory was first granted to Charles Aubert de La Chesnaye on November 25, 1683. It measured three leagues along the Madawaska River and extended two leagues away from the river. Its territory included the Lake Témiscouata.
