= Frederick Lennox Ingall =

- Born: March 16, 1795 Lambeth, England
- Died: 1862
- Allegiance: United Kingdom
- Branch: British Army
- Rank: Major
- Commands: Assistant Quartermaster General in Quebec and Montreal
- Battles / wars: Various postings in North America

Frederick Lennox Ingall (March 16, 1795 – 1862) was a British Army officer known for his contributions to military infrastructure and defensive fortifications in Canada.

== Early life ==
Frederick Lennox Ingall was born on March 16, 1795, in Lambeth, England. Little is known about his early life before joining the British Army.

== Military career ==
In 1813, Ingall joined the British Army as an ensign in the 70th Regiment of Foot. His early service saw him rise through the ranks, and by 1816, he was promoted to lieutenant. In 1824, he joined the Royal Newfoundland Veteran Companies and later transferred to the 15th Regiment of Foot in 1826.

== Service in Ireland and North America ==
In 1827, Ingall was stationed in Athenry, Ireland, before being posted to North America. By 1829, he led an expedition to Obaoca Bay, and over the following years, he served at various posts in Upper and Lower Canada. From 1831 to 1833, he was stationed on Île aux Noix, and from 1834 to 1837, he served at the base in Penetanguishene, Upper Canada.

== Construction of fortifications ==
Ingall's contributions included significant infrastructure efforts. In 1839, he was tasked with establishing a military post at Lake Témiscouata, where he supervised the construction of 11 forts and palisades along the Grand Portage route, strategically designed to protect the area from potential American incursions.

== Later career and promotion ==
In 1841, Ingall was promoted to captain and assigned the role of Assistant Quartermaster General in Quebec City, a position he held until 1854. His dedication to service earned him the title of major in 1854, and he served as Assistant Quartermaster General in Montreal until 1860.

== Death ==
Frederick Lennox Ingall died in 1862.
