= Saint-Jacques Parish =

Saint-Jacques
- Parish
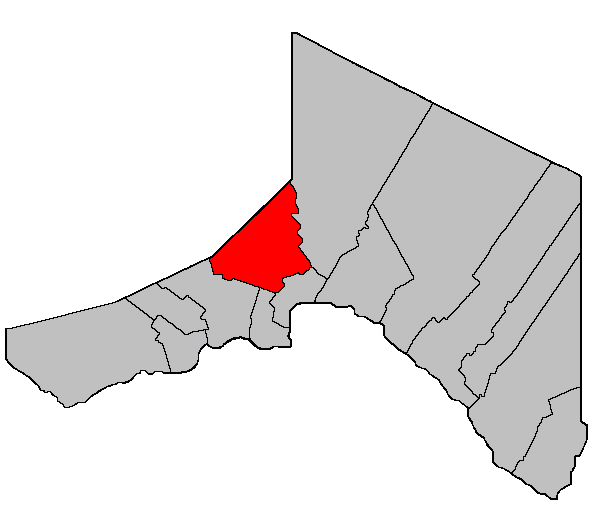
- Location within Madawaska County. Map is missing northeastern portion of Parish.
- Coordinates: 47.43°N 68.385°W
- Country: Canada
- Province: New Brunswick
- County: Madawaska
- Erected: 1877

Area
  - Land: 298.44 km^{2} (115.23 sq mi)

Population (2021)
  - Total: 1,652
  - Density: 5.5/km^{2} (14/sq mi)
  - Change 2016-2021: ▲3.5%
  - Dwellings: 755
- Time zone: UTC-4 (AST)
  - Summer (DST): UTC-3 (ADT)
- Figures do not include portion within the city of Edmundston

Saint-Jacques is a geographic parish in Madawaska County, New Brunswick, Canada. The parish consists of two discontiguous portions separated by Saint-Joseph Parish. (Note: The Territorial Division Act divides the province into 152 parishes, the cities of Saint John and Fredericton, and one town of Grand Falls. The Interpretation Act clarifies that parishes include any local government within their borders.)

For governance purposes the southwestern portion is divided between the city of Edmundston, which includes the tier of grants on either side of the Madawaska River, and the Northwest rural district; the northeastern portion is part of the rural district. Both city and rural district are members of the Northwest Regional Service Commission.

Before the 2023 governance reform, the parish was divided between Edmundston and the local service district of the parish of Saint-Jacques, part of which was annexed by Edmundston in the reform.

== Origin of name ==
The parish is named for the local Roman Catholic church.

== History ==
Saint-Jacques was erected in 1877 from Madawaska Parish; the name was spelt without a hyphen.

In 1930 part of Saint-Jacques was included in the newly erected Saint-Joseph Parish.

In 1941 the boundary was altered.

In 1946 Saint-Jacques was affected by the major reorganisation of Madawaska County parish boundaries.

In 1973 the hyphen was added to the parish's legal name.

== Boundaries ==
Saint-Jacques Parish comprises two discontiguous portions: the populated southwestern portion and the interior northeastern portion, which lacks provincial roads.

The southeastern portion is bounded:

- on the northwest by the Quebec border;
- on the east, running entirely along grant lines, beginning on the provincial border at a point about 75 metres southwest of Ruisseau du Coin, then running generally southerly along the eastern line of the Sweeney Settlement grants, which straddle Ruisseau Richard Road and then Iroquois Road, until it passes the Petite rivière Iroquois (formerly the East Iroquois River) near Roussel et Martin Road, then westerly along the southern line of grants to Meril Grandmaison and Marcel Grandmaison, to the northeastern line of Tier Three of the Plourde Settlement, which straddles Iroquois Road, then southeasterly along Tier Three to a point about 200 metres past the Petite rivière Iroquois, at the easternmost corner of a grant to David A. Rousseau, then southwesterly along the southeastern line of grants to Rousseau and Pierre Plourde to the northeastern line of Tier Two of Plourde Settlement at a point about 150 metres northwest of the NB Power transmission line, then southeasterly along Tier Two to the Saint-Joseph Road, then southwesterly along the southern line of a grant to Joseph Theriault to the junction of St. Onge Road and Saint Joseph Road on the northeastern line of Tier One of the Plourde Settlement, which fronts on the eastern shore of the Madawaska River, then southeasterly along Tier One to the easternmost corner of a grant to Cyprien Michaud, about 200 metres north of the bridge across the Iroquois River on Olivier Boucher Road;
- on the south, running entirely along grant lines, southwesterly along the southeastern line of the Michaud grant, then nearly a kilometre upstream on the Madawaska, then southwesterly and westerly along the southern line of a grant to Charles Hughes, which is in Tier One of Trout Brook Settlement, to Farline Road, on the eastern line of Tier Two of Trout Brook Settlement, then southerly about 1.2 kilometres along Tier Two to its southern end, then southwesterly along the southeastern line of Tier Two and Tier Three of Trout Brook Settlement, then northwesterly along Tier Six of the Riceville Settlement, which straddles Guerrette Road and Richard Road, to its end, then southwesterly about 550 metres along the end of Tier Six to the southernmost corner of a grant to Denis H. Nadeau, then northwesterly along the southwestern line of the Nadeau grant, passing through the junction of Sisson Road and Paradis Road, to the eastern line of Tier Three of the Michaud Settlement;
- on the west, running entirely along grant lines, beginning at the corner of the Nadeau grant and running northerly about 750 metres along Tier Three to the northeastern corner of a grant to Joseph P. Nadeau, then southwesterly along the southern line of a grant to Felix Marquis to the western line of Tier Three, then northerly and northwesterly along Tier Three, this section of which straddles Sisson Road, to the provincial border.

The northwestern portion is bounded:

- on the northeast by the Restigouche County line;
- on the east by Green River;
- on the southwest by Lake Branch, which runs through First Lake, Second Lake, and Third Lake;
- on the west by the provincial border

== Communities ==
Communities at least partly within the parish. bold indicates an incorporated municipality; italics indicate a name no longer in official use

- **Edmundston**
  - Saint-Jacques
- Ennemond
- Grandmaison
- Moulin-Morneault
- Patrieville
- Petite-Rivière-à-la-Truite
- Quatre-Coins
- Rivière-à-la-Truite
- St. Joseph Settlement
- Sweeney Settlement

== Bodies of water ==
Bodies of water (Note: Not including brooks, ponds or coves.) at least partly within the parish.

- Rivière à la Truite
- Green River (French Rivière Verte)
- Iroquois River
- Madawaska River
- Paradis Stream
- Lake Branch
- First Lake
- Petit lac Saint-Jean
- Second Lake
- Third Lake
- Twin Lakes

== Other notable places ==
Parks, historic sites, and other noteworthy places at least partly within the parish.

- Edmundston Airport
- Falls Brook Protected Natural Area
- Green River North Protected Natural Area
- République Provincial Park

== Demographics ==
Parish population total does not include portion in Edmundston

=== Population ===
Canada census – Saint-Jacques community profile

	2021	2016	2011
Population	1,652 (+3.5% from 2016)	1,596 (-0.2% from 2011)	1,599 (-0.5% from 2006)
Land area	298.44 km^{2} (115.23 sq mi)	299.49 km^{2} (115.63 sq mi)	299.80 km^{2} (115.75 sq mi)
Population density	5.5/km^{2} (14/sq mi)		5.3/km^{2} (14/sq mi)
Median age	52.4 (M: 52.8, F: 52)	51.2 (M: 52.0, F: 50.2)	46.5 (M: 47.3, F: 45.7)
Private dwellings	710 (total)	748 (total)	710 (total)
Median household income		$57,003	$65,389

References: 2021 2016 2011

Historical Census Data - Saint-Jacques Parish, New Brunswick

Year	Pop.	±%
1991	1,648	—
1996	1,694	+2.8%

Year	Pop.	±%
2001	1,715	+1.2%
2006	1,607	−6.3%

Year	Pop.	±%
2011	1,599	−0.5%
2016	1,596	−0.2%

=== Language ===
Canada Census Mother Tongue - Saint-Jacques Parish, New Brunswick
Census	Total	French			English			French & English			Other		
Year	Responses	Count	Trend	Pop %	Count	Trend	Pop %	Count	Trend	Pop %	Count	Trend	Pop %
2016	1,600	1,525		95.3%	60		3.8%	5		0.3%	10		0.6%
2011	1,600	1,535	▲0.3%	95.94%	50	▲25.0%	3.12%	10	▼71.4%	0.62%	5	▲ n/a%	0.31%
2006	1,605	1,530	▼7.3%	95.33%	40	▼20.0%	2.49%	35	▲71.4%	2.18%	0	▼100.0%	0.00%
2001	1,720	1,650	▼0.6%	95.93%	50	▲50.0%	2.91%	10	▼66.7%	0.58%	10	▲ n/a%	0.58%
1996	1,715	1,660	n/a	96.79%	25	n/a	1.46%	30	n/a	1.75%	0	n/a	0.00%

== See also ==
- List of parishes in New Brunswick
