= Iroquois River (Saint John River tributary) =

Location
- Country: Canada
- Provinces: Quebec and New Brunswick
- Regions: Bas-Saint-Laurent and Madawaska County

Physical characteristics
- Source
  - location: Lac Iroquois, Dégelis, MRC de Témiscouata, Québec
  - coordinates: 47°38′47″N 68°23′55″W
  - elevation: 305 m (1,001 ft)
- Mouth
  - location: Saint John River (Bay of Fundy)
  - coordinates: 47°21′36″N 68°16′41″W
  - elevation: 132 m (433 ft)
- Length: 45.7 km (28.4 mi)

Basin features
- Tributaries
  - left: (from the mouth) Ruisseau à Blanchette, Little Iroquois River, ruisseau Falls, ruisseau Fournier.
  - right: (from the mouth) Ruisseau Bélanger, ruisseau Dufour, ruisseau Ritchie, ruisseau du Coin, ruisseau Victoire, ruisseau Horseback.

The Iroquois River is a tributary of the Saint John River (Bay of Fundy) emptying in New Brunswick, in Canada. This river flows into the Notre Dame Mountains, in the municipality of Dégelis, Quebec, in Temiscouata Regional County Municipality (RCM), in administrative region of Bas-Saint-Laurent, in Quebec; and in the Madawaska County, in New Brunswick, in Canada.

The Iroquois River flows south especially in forest areas, more or less in parallel, between the Little Iroquois River (East side) and the Madawaska River (Saint John River).

The Iroquois River flows on the north shore of Saint John River (Bay of Fundy). The latter flows southeast through all the New Brunswick province and pours on the north bank of the Bay of Fundy which is opened to the southwest on the Atlantic Ocean.

== Geography ==
=== Course of the river ===
The Iroquois River originates at the mouth of Lake Iroquois (length: 0.6 kilometres (0.37 mi); altitude: 305 metres (1,001 ft)), located in the municipality of Dégelis, Quebec, in MRC Témiscouata Regional County Municipality (RCM). This lake is located in a small valley facing southeast, which counts ten lake. This valley extends to the northwest on the other river side, part of the Owen River.

The mouth of Lake Iroquois is located at:

- 1.3 kilometres (0.81 mi) west of the border between Quebec and New Brunswick;
- 8.4 kilometres (5.2 mi) east of the southeast part of the Grand Lac Squatec;
- 21.9 kilometres (13.6 mi) northeast of downtown Dégelis;
- 31.1 kilometres (19.3 mi) north of the confluence of the Iroquois River.

The Iroquois River, which flows on 45.7 kilometres (28.4 mi), according to the following segments:

Lower course of the river (segment of 25.7 kilometres (16.0 mi))

From the mouth of Lake Iroquois, the Iroquois River flows over:

- 2.6 kilometres (1.6 mi) to the southeast, to the bridge of the forest road;
- 1.1 kilometres (0.68 mi) to the south, along the border to the border of Quebec and New Brunswick;
- 1.6 kilometres (0.99 mi) to the south, forming a detour to the east, in the Madawaska County to New Brunswick, to the Interprovincial Boundary;
- 1.1 kilometres (0.68 mi) to the south, forming a detour to the west, in the municipality of Dégelis, to return to the interprovincial boundary;
- 2.6 kilometres (1.6 mi) to the southeast, in the Madawaska County, to Falls Creek (from the northeast);
- 9.4 kilometres (5.8 mi) to the South, to the highway bridge;
- 2.8 kilometres (1.7 mi) to the South, to the highway bridge;
- 4.5 kilometres (2.8 mi) to the southeast, to the confluence of the Little Iroquois River (from the North).

Lower course of the river (segment of 20.0 kilometres (12.4 mi))

From the confluence of the Little Iroquois River, the Iroquois River flows over:

- 1.7 kilometres (1.1 mi) to the South, up to the highway bridge;
- 5.7 kilometres (3.5 mi) southward up to the boundary of the city of Edmundston, New Brunswick;
- 2.1 kilometres (1.3 mi) to the southeast, up to the highway bridge;
- 5.1 kilometres (3.2 mi) to the southeast, up to the northeast of the "Côte à Blanchette" (English: Blanchette slope), to the highway bridge;
- 5.4 kilometres (3.4 mi) to the south, passing at the east of the city of Edmundston, up to the confluence of the river

The Iroquois River flows on the north shore of Saint John River (Bay of Fundy) on the west side of the area designated "Platin of St. Basil", facing the border of Maine. This confluence is located at:

- 3.3 kilometres (2.1 mi) downstream of the confluence of the Madawaska River;
- 1.5 kilometres (0.93 mi) downstream of the Madawaska island;
- 13.5 kilometres (8.4 mi) upstream of the confluence of the Green River (Saint John River).

== Toponymy ==
The toponym "Iroquois River" was made official on August 17, 1978 at the Commission de toponymie du Québec (Quebec Geographical Names Board).

== See also ==
- Témiscouata Regional County Municipality (RCM)
- Dégelis, Quebec, a municipality of Quebec
- Madawaska County, in New Brunswick
- Little Iroquois River, a stream of New Brunswick
- List of rivers of New Brunswick
- List of rivers of Quebec
