= Notre-Dame-du-Lac, Quebec =

Coordinates: 47.600°N 68.800°W

Notre-Dame-du-Lac
- Former city
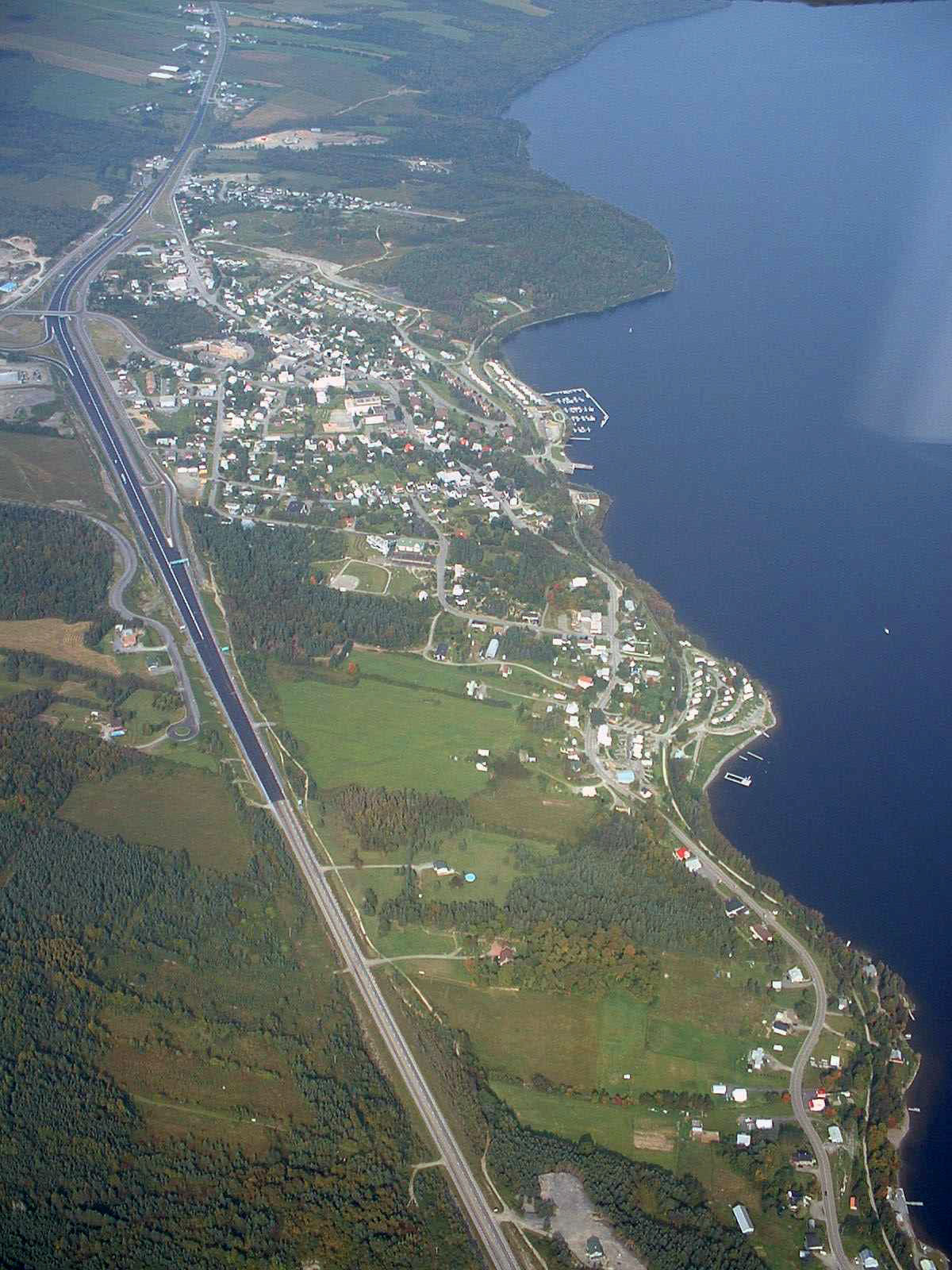
- Interactive map of Notre-Dame-du-Lac
- Country: Canada
- Province: Quebec
- MRC: Témiscouata
- Established: 23 November 1869
- Disestablished: 5 May 2010
- Merged to create: Témiscouata-sur-le-Lac

Area
  - Total: 106.13 km^{2} (40.98 sq mi)

Population (2006)^{[1]}
  - Total: 2,098
  - Density: 20/km^{2} (52/sq mi)
- Time zone: UTC-5 (EST)
  - Summer (DST): UTC-4 (EDT)
- Postal Code: G0L 1X0

Notre-Dame-du-Lac (French pronunciation: [nɔtʁə dam dy lak]) is a former city in the regional county municipality of Témiscouata in the province of Quebec, Canada, located in the administrative region du Bas-Saint-Laurent. On 5 May 2010, the cities of Cabano and Notre-Dame-du-Lac combined to form a new city named Témiscouata-sur-le-Lac. "Notre-Dame-du-Lac" was designated as a section of the new city.

== Geography ==
The population of Notre-Dame-du-Lac is around 2200. The city is built on an amphitheatre in the middle of the Valley of Témiscouata. Until its joining with Cabano, Notre-Dame-du-Lac was the chef-lieu de la regional county municipality and the hospital, ferry, and police station of Témiscouata were located there. The arena of Notre-Dame-du-Lac is also well known as the largest and best equipped in the region.

== History ==
First created as a parish in 1871, with the name Détour-du-Lac, two years after the parish which received its first priest in 1861, Notre-Dame-du-Lac obtained "city" status in 1968 as a result of an adjoinment with the homonymous village established in 1949. The name "Détour-du-Lac" was given because of its geographic situation, which made the place an excellent one to come alongside it and sink into the earth.

On December 2, 1969, Notre-Dame-du-Lac suffered its worst disaster in history when at least 51 people were killed in an early morning fire at Repos du Viellard, a home for the elderly Only 22 people survived the blaze, including the rest home's owner, wife, and children

On 21 June 2009, the motion to merge Notre-Dame-du-Lac with the neighbouring city of Cabano was adopted by 70% by referendum. The latter voted favourably on the option in excess of 56%. On 5 May 2010, a decree authorizing the joining of the two cities was published in the Gazette officielle du Québec (official newspaper of Québec). The decree announced the holding of elections on 20 June 2010 to elect a new mayor and a new city council. While awaiting the adoption of a new permanent name, the new city was designated "Cabano–Notre-Dame-du-Lac." A referendum organized in the two former cities made the choice of Témiscouata-sur-le-Lac as the new name of the city.

== Tourism ==
The bike trail Le Petit Témis (135 km) which follows the banks of the lake reveals its lake and the island in a tour of nature. Each year, the "hotdog party" occurs on the beach of the lake.

=== Pont de Glace ===
In the winter, a bridge of ice is erected over Lake Témiscouata which allows, to vehicles as well as pedestrians, crossing the lake between Notre-Dame-du-Lac and the next parish: Saint-Juste-du-Lac. In summer, a ferry links the two banks.

=== Notre-Dame-du-Lac "Garden City" ===
Notre-Dame-du-Lac was recently named "Garden City" and has a flower emblem called "The Lady of the Lake," a variety of daylily specially designed for the occasion.
