= Madawaska River (Saint John River tributary) =

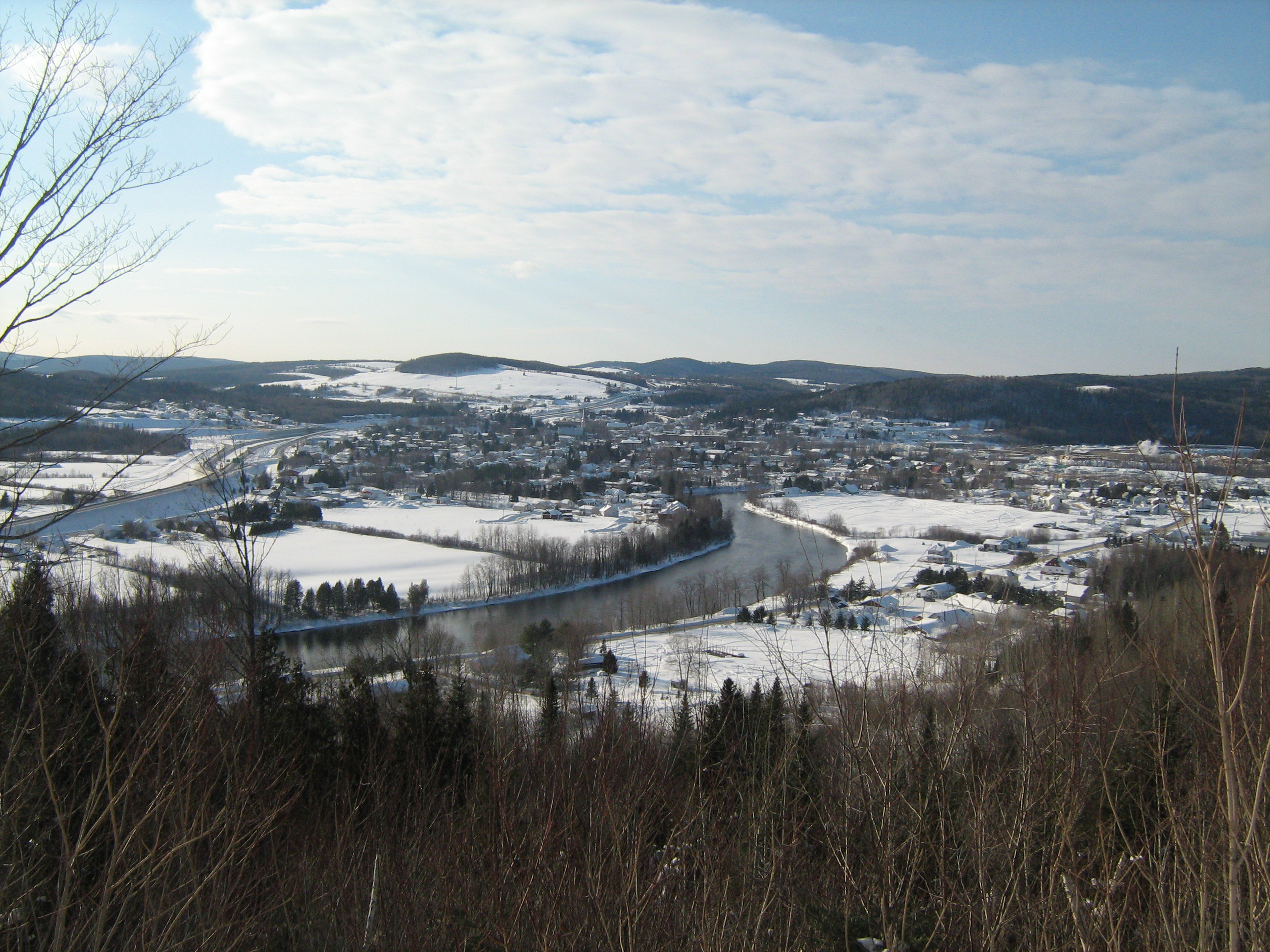
- Madawaska River in Degelis, Quebec, in winter

Location
- Country: Canada
- Cities: Dégelis, Quebec; Edmundston, New Brunswick

Physical characteristics
- Source
  - location: Lake Témiscouata, Dégelis, Quebec, Temiscouata Regional County Municipality, Quebec
  - coordinates: 47°34′14″N 68°38′33″W
  - elevation: 141 metres (463 ft)
- Mouth
  - location: Edmundston, New Brunswick
  - coordinates: 47°21′38″N 68°19′24″W
  - elevation: 135 metres (443 ft)
- Length: 39.8 km (24.7 mi)

Basin features
- Tributaries
  - left: (from the mouth) Lynch Brook, Island Brook, Languedoc Brook, Lizotte Brook, Birch River (Madawaska River).
  - right: (from the mouth) Troot River (Madawaska River), Griffin Brook, Perches River (Madawaska River).

The Madawaska River flows from Lake Témiscouata in Quebec, through Degelis, Quebec, to join the Saint John River at Edmundston, New Brunswick.

The course of the Madawaska River is accessible in Quebec by route 185 and New Brunswick by Highway 2, which run along the river side South West.

== Toponymy ==
Various theories exist over the etymology of the word Madawaska. One is that the river's name comes from the Algonquian word "Madoueskak", which means "land of the porcupine". In Maliseet, the word "Matawaskiyak" translates to "at the place where water flows out over grass", there is also speculation that it refers to the 'meeting of two rivers where there is grass'. The Madawaska river is a large drainage basin for Lake Temiscouata and other waterways from the north. Before the city of Edmundston changed the natural course of the river, the spring freshet would cause several branches of the river to flood the land resulting in various waterfalls.

The river formed part of the Témiscouata Portage, a canoe and land route from the Bay of Fundy to the Saint Lawrence River dating from the late 17th century. A road, now Route 185 and part of the Trans-Canada Highway, was built along this route in 1862. The Témiscouata Railway was built along the same route in 1886. In the early 20th century, timber and logs were floated down the river to New Brunswick.

The Petit Témis Interprovincial Linear Park is a rail trail running from Edmundston, NB to Cabano, QC in the abandoned CN rail corridor that was originally built by the Temiscouata Railway.

The toponym "Madawaska River" was officialized as of December 8, 1968, at Commission de toponymie du Québec (Quebec Geographical Names Board).

== Course of the river ==
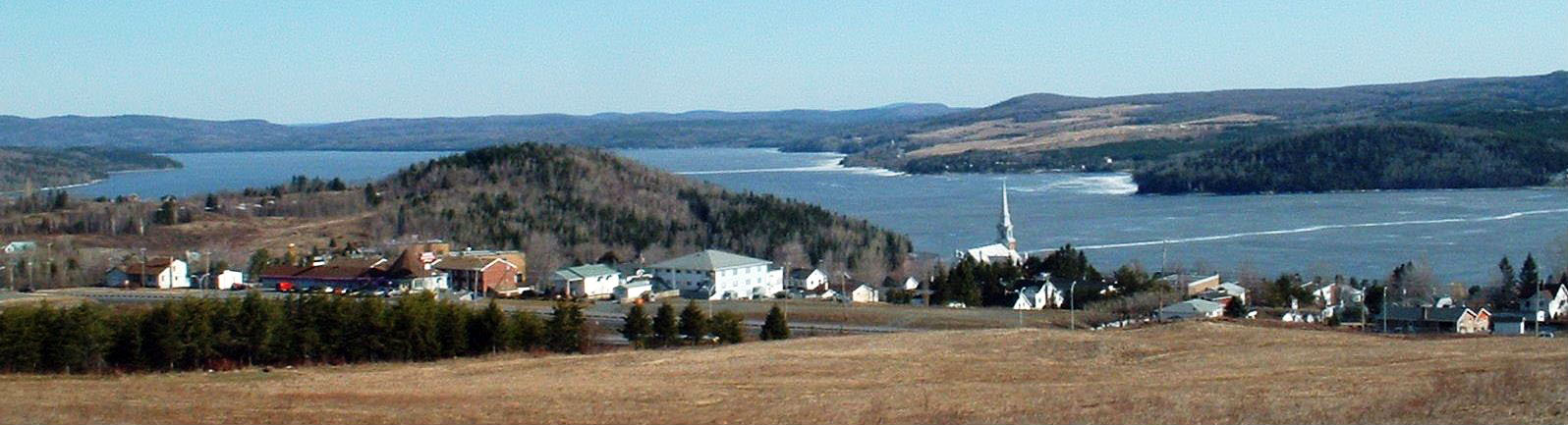
The river has its source in Lake Témiscouata.

The Madawaska River originates in Lake Témiscouata, about 141 metres (463 ft) meters. The river follows a winding course generally oriented on South-East. The river runs through successively Dégelis, Quebec, in Quebec; then the parish of Saint-Jacques Parish and Edmundston, in Madawaska County, in New Brunswick. The river empties into the left side of Saint John River in downtown Edmundston and facing the American town of Madawaska.

The Madawaska River flows over 39.8 kilometres (24.7 mi) generally towards the Southeast:

Upper river courses (in Quebec) (segment of 18.4 kilometres (11.4 mi))

From the dam at the mouth of Lake Témiscouata, the Madawaska River flows over:

- 3.4 kilometres (2.1 mi) to the South in a big S, passing at the East side of the "Mont Sainte-Anne", up to the bridge of the 7th Street in Dégelis;
- 5.1 kilometres (3.2 mi) to the Southeast, bypassing the island Beaupré and passing southwest of a mountain, up to the confluence of the Birches River (Madawaska River) (from the North);
- 6.4 kilometres (4.0 mi) to the Southeast, forming a detour to the North, and then collecting the waters of Griffin Creek (from the Southwest), up to the confluence of the Languedoc creek (from North);
- 3.5 kilometres (2.2 mi) to the Southeast, passing on the Northeast of Edmundston airport, up to the border between Quebec and New Brunswick. Note: A marsh area (West side of the river) runs along the end of this segment on 2.9 kilometres (1.8 mi).

Lower course of the river (at New Brunswick) (segment of 21.4 kilometres (13.3 mi))

From the border between Quebec and New Brunswick, the Madawaska River flows:

- 1.7 kilometres (1.1 mi) to the Southeast, up to Island Brook (from the Northeast);
- 9.4 kilometres (5.8 mi) to the Southeast, bypassing four islands, up to the bridge of the village of Saint-Jacques Parish;
- 6.1 kilometres (3.8 mi) to the Southeast, through the village of Saint-Jacques Parish up to the railway bridge Canadian National Railway;
- 4.2 kilometres (2.6 mi) to the Southeast, passing under a road bridge to its confluence

== Dams ==
=== Dam of Lake Témiscouata ===
The river actually begins its course at the foot of the dam Lake Temiscouata. The dam, built in 1930 by the "St. John River Storage Company", was acquired by Hydro-Québec during nationalization of electricity in 1963. It was completely rebuilt between 1993 and 1994.

The construction of this dam has had the effect of raising the lake level of about sixty centimeters above the normal high water level, set at 148.13 metres (486.0 ft), to reach the level of 148.74 metres (488.0 ft). The dam allows for storing 125,000,000 metres (410,104,986.877 ft) of additional water from Lake Témiscouata, less than 6% of the volume of water contained naturally in the lake. Another consequence of the enhancement of Lake Témiscouata is the relative youth of the shores which limits the number of natural beaches and potential for recreation.

=== Edmundston Dam ===
The Edmundston Dam, located at the confluence of the Madawaska and Saint John rivers in Edmundston New Brunswick, was established in 1917. Alternatively called Madawaska Hydro-Dam Fraser Plant, or Fraser Dam and Hydroelectric Generating Station.

=== Fraser Dam ===
An original name for the Edmundston Dam. Constructed in 1917 to provide power for the Fraser Ltd. pulp mill operation.

== See also ==
- Bas-Saint-Laurent, administrative region in Quebec
- Temiscouata Regional County Municipality, a RCM of Quebec
- Lake Témiscouata, a waterbody in Quebec
- Madawaska County, a county of New Brunswick
- Edmundston, New Brunswick, a city of New Brunswick
- Saint John River (Bay of Fundy), a river
- List of rivers of New Brunswick
- List of rivers of Quebec

== Bibliography ==
- Ganong, William F. (1904). A Monograph of the Origins of the Settlements in New Brunswick. Ottawa: J. Hope. p. 185.
- Rayburn, Alan (1975). Geographical Names of New Brunswick. Ottawa: Énergie, Mines et Ressources Canada.
