= Témiscouata-sur-le-Lac =

- City
- Ville de Témiscouata-sur-le-Lac
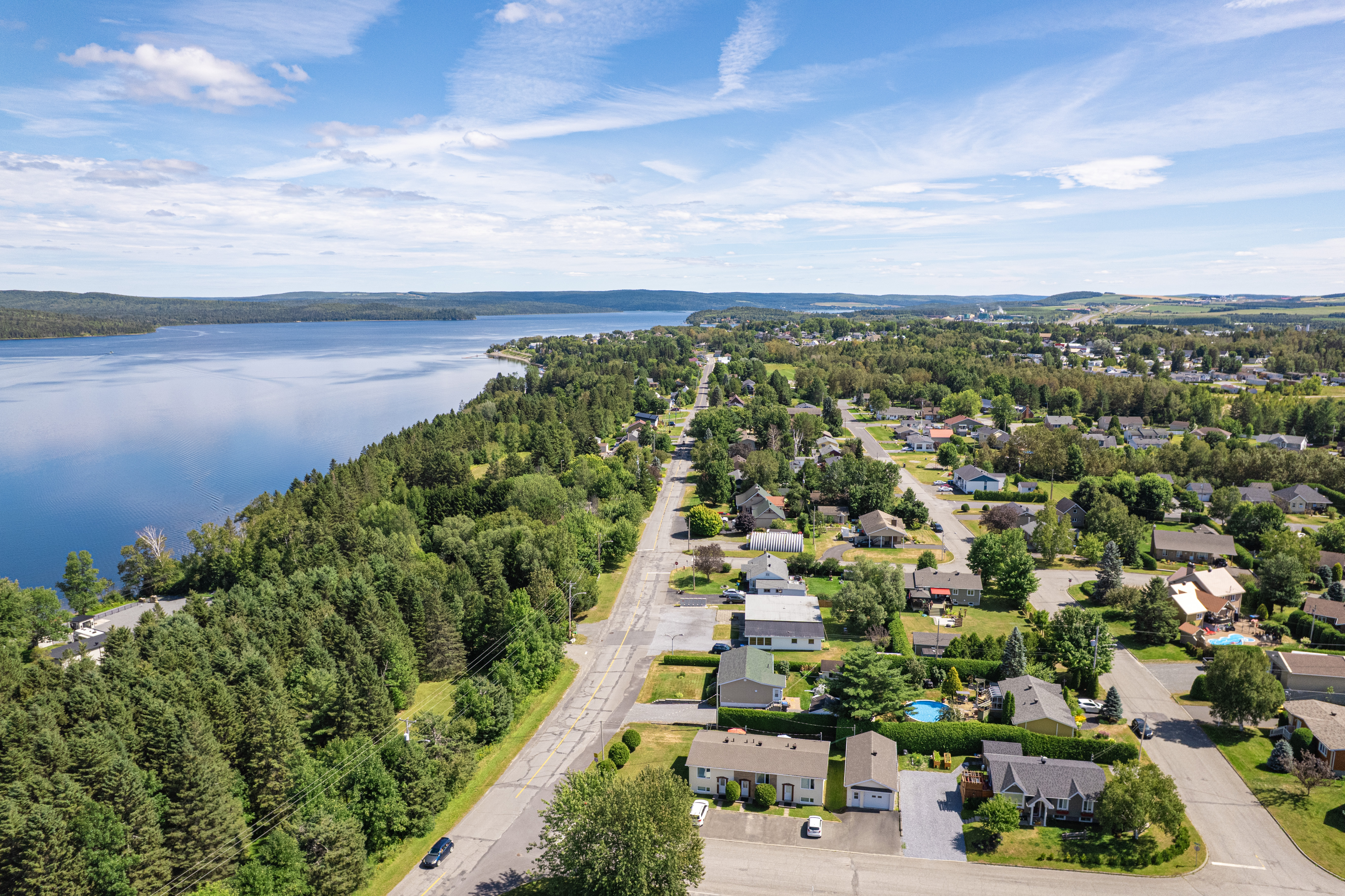
- Aerial view of Témiscouata-sur-le-Lac
- Motto: Fortiter ad Alta (Strongly to high)
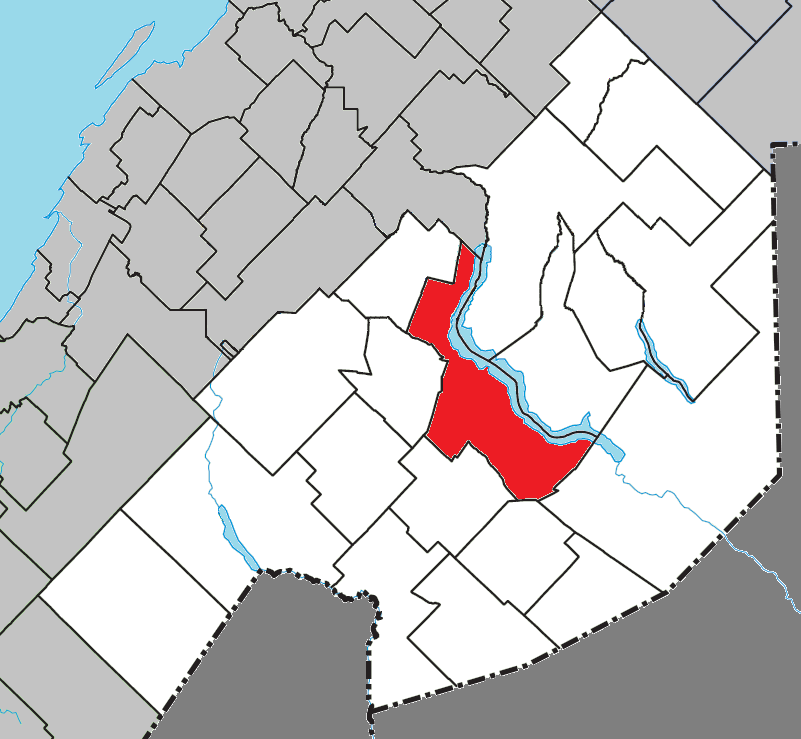
- Location within Témiscouata RCM

- Location in eastern Quebec
- Coordinates: 47.68°N 68.88°W
- Country: Canada
- Province: Quebec
- Region: Bas-Saint-Laurent
- RCM: Témiscouata
- Constituted: May 5, 2010

Government
  - Mayor: Christian St-Pierre
  - Federal riding: Côte-du-Sud—Rivière-du-Loup—Kataskomiq—Témiscouata
  - Prov. riding: Rivière-du-Loup–Témiscouata–Les Basques

Area
  - City: 245.60 km^{2} (94.83 sq mi)
  - Land: 218.81 km^{2} (84.48 sq mi)
  - Urban: 5.62 km^{2} (2.17 sq mi)

Population (2021)
  - City: 5,054
  - Density: 23.1/km^{2} (60/sq mi)
  - Urban: 3,626
  - Urban density: 647/km^{2} (1,680/sq mi)
  - Pop 2016-2021: ▲2.9%
  - Dwellings: 2,699
- Time zone: UTC−5 (EST)
  - Summer (DST): UTC−4 (EDT)
- Postal code(s): G0L 1E0 & G0L 1X0
- Area codes: 418 and 581
- Highways A-85 (TCH): R-185 (TCH); R-232
- Website: www.temiscouatasurlelac.ca

Témiscouata-sur-le-Lac (French pronunciation: [temiskwata syʁ lə lak], lit. 'Temiscouata on the Lake') is a municipality in Quebec, Canada, situated in the MRC of Témiscouata in the Bas-Saint-Laurent region. The city was created on May 5, 2010, from the mergers of the city of Cabano and Notre-Dame-du-Lac. The new city was called Cabano–Notre-Dame-du-Lac until November 13, 2010.

This region is part of traditional Wolastoqey territory.

== History ==
On May 5, 2010, the cities of Cabano and Notre-Dame-du-Lac merged to form the city of Cabano–Notre-Dame-du-Lac, which was later named Témiscouata-sur-le-Lac. The name was approved by more than 60% of the population during a referendum on June 20, 2010, and approved by the Minister of Municipal Affairs. The mayors of the cities of Cabano and Notre-Dame-du-Lac shared the role of mayor until June 10, 2010, when Gilles Garon was elected new mayor of the city.

== Geography ==
Témiscouata-sur-le-Lac is situated on the south side of the Saint Lawrence River, at about 260 km from Québec City, and 470 km west of Gaspé. The cities of importance close to Témiscouata-sur-le-Lac are Rivière-du-Loup, at 60 km to the north-west, Trois-Pistoles at 65 km to the north, Rimouski at 110 km north-east, and Edmundston in New Brunswick, at 60 km to the south-west. Témiscouata-sur-le-Lac is situated at 40 km to the north-west of the border with New Brunswick on Route 185.

The city of Témiscouata-sur-le-Lac is composed of two sectors: Cabano and Notre-Dame-du-Lac. There are also two small communities as well: Rivière-Creuse and Route-du-Sault.

Témiscouata-sur-le-Lac is situated on Lake Témiscouata which extends for 45 km. It is the second lake of importance on the Saint Lawrence River.

=== Climate ===
Climate data for Témiscouata-sur-le-Lac (1981–2010)
Month	Jan	Feb	Mar	Apr	May	Jun	Jul	Aug	Sep	Oct	Nov	Dec	Year
Record high °C (°F)	11.0 (51.8)	16.0 (60.8)	18.5 (65.3)	27.5 (81.5)	32.8 (91.0)	33.9 (93.0)	34.5 (94.1)	33.9 (93.0)	30.0 (86.0)	26.0 (78.8)	18.9 (66.0)	14.0 (57.2)	34.5 (94.1)
Mean daily maximum °C (°F)	−9.0 (15.8)	−6.5 (20.3)	−0.9 (30.4)	6.9 (44.4)	15.6 (60.1)	20.8 (69.4)	23.1 (73.6)	21.9 (71.4)	16.4 (61.5)	9.6 (49.3)	1.6 (34.9)	−5.1 (22.8)	7.9 (46.2)
Daily mean °C (°F)	−13.7 (7.3)	−11.4 (11.5)	−5.5 (22.1)	2.3 (36.1)	10.0 (50.0)	15.3 (59.5)	17.9 (64.2)	16.8 (62.2)	11.7 (53.1)	5.5 (41.9)	−1.7 (28.9)	−9.0 (15.8)	3.2 (37.7)
Mean daily minimum °C (°F)	−18.4 (−1.1)	−16.2 (2.8)	−10.1 (13.8)	−2.3 (27.9)	4.4 (39.9)	9.8 (49.6)	12.7 (54.9)	11.7 (53.1)	7.0 (44.6)	1.4 (34.5)	−5.0 (23.0)	−12.8 (9.0)	−1.5 (29.3)
Record low °C (°F)	−37.8 (−36.0)	−37.2 (−35.0)	−31.0 (−23.8)	−20.6 (−5.1)	−9.4 (15.1)	−5.6 (21.9)	3.3 (37.9)	0.5 (32.9)	−3.3 (26.1)	−10.0 (14.0)	−21.0 (−5.8)	−36.5 (−33.7)	−37.8 (−36.0)
Average precipitation mm (inches)	77.0 (3.03)	61.5 (2.42)	60.0 (2.36)	69.1 (2.72)	90.2 (3.55)	96.9 (3.81)	118.9 (4.68)	95.9 (3.78)	87.2 (3.43)	88.7 (3.49)	83.2 (3.28)	71.4 (2.81)	1,000 (39.36)
Average rainfall mm (inches)	17.4 (0.69)	12.5 (0.49)	20.8 (0.82)	49.4 (1.94)	86.9 (3.42)	96.9 (3.81)	118.9 (4.68)	95.9 (3.78)	87.2 (3.43)	85.4 (3.36)	50.2 (1.98)	20.0 (0.79)	741.5 (29.19)
Average snowfall cm (inches)	59.6 (23.5)	49.0 (19.3)	39.2 (15.4)	20.1 (7.9)	3.3 (1.3)	0 (0)	0 (0)	0 (0)	0 (0)	3.3 (1.3)	33.0 (13.0)	51.5 (20.3)	259 (102)
Average precipitation days (≥ 0.2 mm)	15.2	11.5	12.2	13.4	15.1	14.7	16.6	16.9	17.1	16.4	15.0	14.4	178.5
Average rainy days (≥ 0.2 mm)	2.3	2.1	4.1	10.6	14.6	14.7	16.6	16.9	17.1	16.0	9.0	3.2	127.2
Average snowy days (≥ 0.2 cm)	14.1	10.5	9.4	5.3	0.86	0	0	0	0	1.3	8.1	12.7	62.26
Mean monthly sunshine hours	67.5	100.4	143.7	159.0	205.0	209.4	226.1	214.9	152.9	107.7	64.6	54.8	1,706
Source: Environment Canada

== Demographics ==
Historical populations
Year	Pop.	±%
2011	5,096	—
2016	4,910	−3.6%
2021	5,054	+2.9%
Source: Statistics Canada

In the 2021 Census of Population conducted by Statistics Canada, Témiscouata-sur-le-Lac had a population of 5,054 living in 2,356 of its 2,699 total private dwellings, a change of 2.9% from its 2016 population of 4,910. With a land area of 218.81 km^{2} (84.48 sq mi), it had a population density of 23.1/km^{2} (59.8/sq mi) in 2021.

Canada census – Témiscouata-sur-le-Lac community profile

	2021	2016	2011
Population	5,054 (+2.9% from 2016)	4,910 (-3.6% from 2011)	5,096 (-3.1% from 2006)
Land area	218.81 km^{2} (84.48 sq mi)	218.80 km^{2} (84.48 sq mi)	218.32 km^{2} (84.29 sq mi)
Population density	23.1/km^{2} (60/sq mi)	22.4/km^{2} (58/sq mi)	23.3/km^{2} (60/sq mi)
Median age	52.8 (M: 51.2, F: 54.8)	51.5 (M: 50.3, F: 52.6)	48.5 (M: 47.5, F: 49.4)
Private dwellings	2,699 (total)	2,670 (total)	2,621 (total)
Median household income	$62,000	$53,998	$53,145

References: 2021 2016 2011

Home Language (2021)
Language	Population	Percentage (%)
French	4,900	99%
English	5	0%
Other	10	0%

== Attractions ==
Fort Ingall is a museum which is a reconstruction of the British fort built during the 19th century.

Lake Témiscouata is an ideal location for all kinds of nautical activities including fishing.

Montagne du Fourneau is known for its hiking trail and its pine forest, which is classified as an exceptional forest ecosystem.

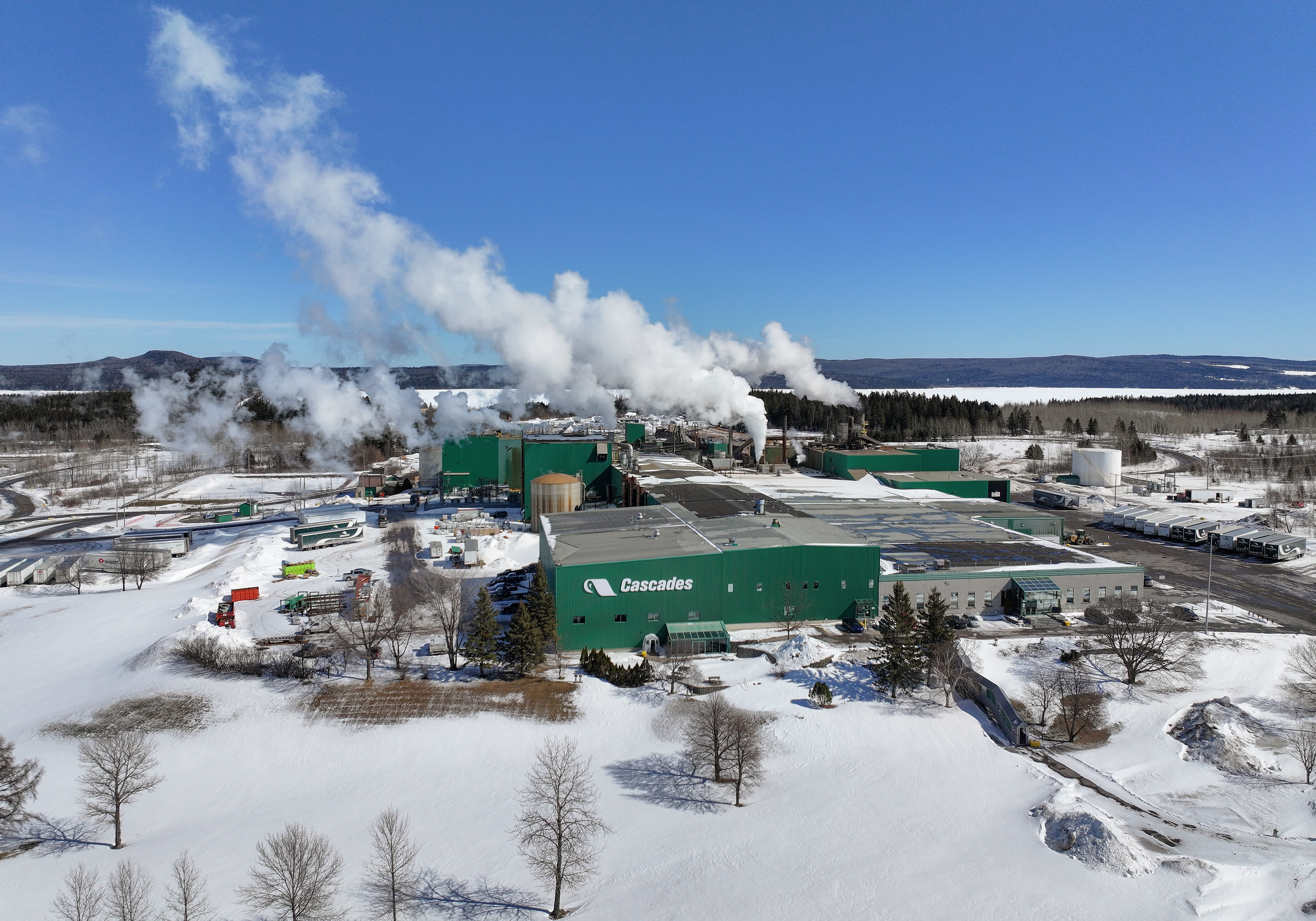
Cascades cardboard packaging factory

Folklore related to their "Loch Ness"-like monster known as Ponik. Lake Pohenegamook is rumored to have a subterranean connection with nearby Lake Temiscouata, where monster sightings occasionally are reported. Some of the town signage depicts the creature.

== Notable people ==
Paul Triquet is a well known recipient of the Victoria Cross, the highest honour for serving in the armies of the Commonwealth. He is a native of Témiscouata-sur-le-Lac.

== See also ==
- List of cities in Quebec
