= Exceptional forest ecosystems of Quebec =

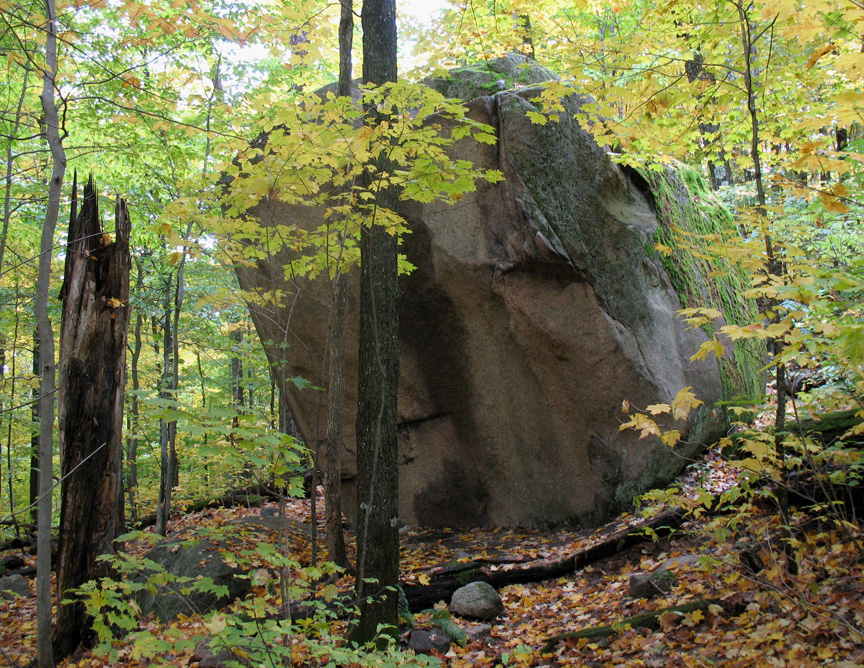
Forêt ancienne du mont Wright

The exceptional forest ecosystems of Quebec (French: Écosystèmes forestiers exceptionnel du Québec; EFE) are stands of trees of outstanding interest for biodiversity that are intended to be preserved for future generations. They are protected by the Ministry of Natural Resources and Wildlife of Quebec.

== Objectives ==
Conservation of biodiversity is one of the key criteria for sustainable forest management. Biodiversity is mostly protected by large conservation areas such as biodiversity reserves and parks. The exceptional forests provide a complementary "fine filter" approach to preserve the full diversity of forests. The forests are special habitats that are likely to be home to rare species, including some that are unknown at present. The first 26 exceptional forests were granted that status in 2002. As of 2018 there were 256 territories with that classification. They are all on public land, since the Ministry has no legal tools to enforce protection of forests on private lands.

== Types of exceptional forest ecosystem ==
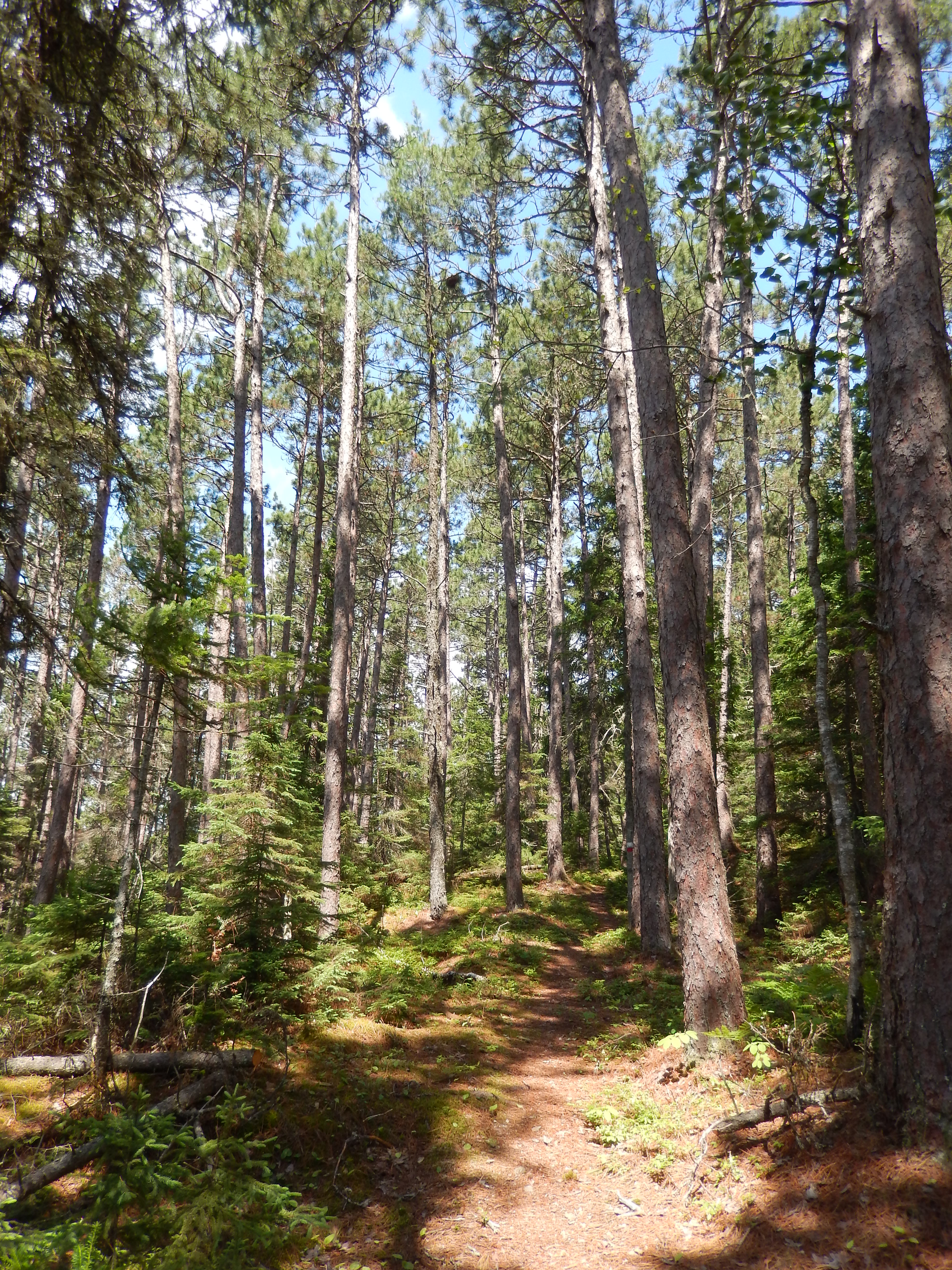
Forêt rare de la Montagne-à-Fourneau

The Quebec Ministry of Natural Resources and Wildlife groups exceptional forest ecosystems into three categories: old-growth forests, refuge forests and rare forest ecosystems. As of 2001 more than 600 EFE sites had been identified south of the 52nd parallel, covering almost 350 square kilometres (140 sq mi).

Old growth forests have not experienced any major anthropogenic disturbance. The dominant trees in the canopy have reached a very advanced stage of maturity, which is unusual in southern Quebec. The forests hold a mixture of young, mature and senescent trees, and debris on the forest floor includes the decaying remains of large trees. These forests are examples of natural forest ecosystems, and contain exceptional and sometimes unique flora. The study of the natural dynamics of these forests can help improve forestry practices that rely on natural development of stands of trees.

Refuge forests are home to significant numbers of plant species that are or may be designated as threatened or vulnerable, including a species of extreme rarity (e.g. known to be found in less than five places in Quebec) or a forest with a remarkable population of threatened or vulnerable species. Candidates for refuge forest status are assessed through a detailed review of information held by the Quebec Ministry of the Environment on the location of species, importance of populations, nature of their habitats and their provincial priority rank on the ministry's official list of species. This type of ecosystem is found mainly in southern Quebec. Threatened or vulnerable species are mainly at risk from habitat loss. Preservation of the refuge forests is essential to their survival, and to preserving biodiversity.

The Nature Conservancy (1988) suggests a forest may be considered rare based on two different viewpoints. One is that it has an unusual composition of species or structure of forest cover, which may be threatened by human activities. An example could be mixed northern red oak (Quercus rubra) and white oak (Quercus alba). There are only a few small forests of this type recognized in Quebec. The other type of rare forest is composed of flora that would not normally be found in its bioclimatic subdomain. These are mainly isolated ecosystems in an unusual subdomain in the north.

== Administration ==
The steps for classifying a forest ecosystem as exceptional include presentation of a proposal, scientific validation, temporary protection, consultation within the ministry, with municipalities, aboriginal communities and rights holders, followed by the ministerial decision. The process may take several years. In the interim, the Forest Sector and Forest Quebec provide administrative protection. Once a forest ecosystem has been classified as exceptional forest ecosystems under section 24.4 of the Forest Act it is under the administrative responsibility of the Ministry of Natural Resources and Wildlife of Quebec. Some activities may be authorized in such forests, including research, education, recreation and tourism, and work related to mining rights. Other rights may be maintained after a forest has been designated exceptional, but special permissions must be obtained.

== Sources ==
- Bouchard, André R. (January 2005), Lignes directrices pour la gestion des territoires classés écosystèmes forestiers exceptionnels (PDF) (in French), Québec: Ministère des Ressources naturelles, de la Faune et des Parcs, Direction de l’environnement forestier
- Les écosystèmes forestiers exceptionnels : éléments clés de la diversité biologique du Québec (in French), Forêts, Faune et Parcs Québec
- Un Écosystème forestier exceptionnel sur votre propriété? (PDF) (in French), MRNF, Direction de l'environnement et de la protection des forêts
- Villeneuve, Normand; Lavoie, Nicole; Bouchard, André R.; Bouchard, Mathieu (Fall 2001), "Les écosystèmes forestiers exceptionnels de la forêt boréale : un patrimoine à découvrir et à protéger" (PDF), Le Naturaliste Canadien (in French), 125 (3), archived from the original (PDF) on 2019-01-22
