= Cabano =

Ville de Cabano Cabano
- Former city
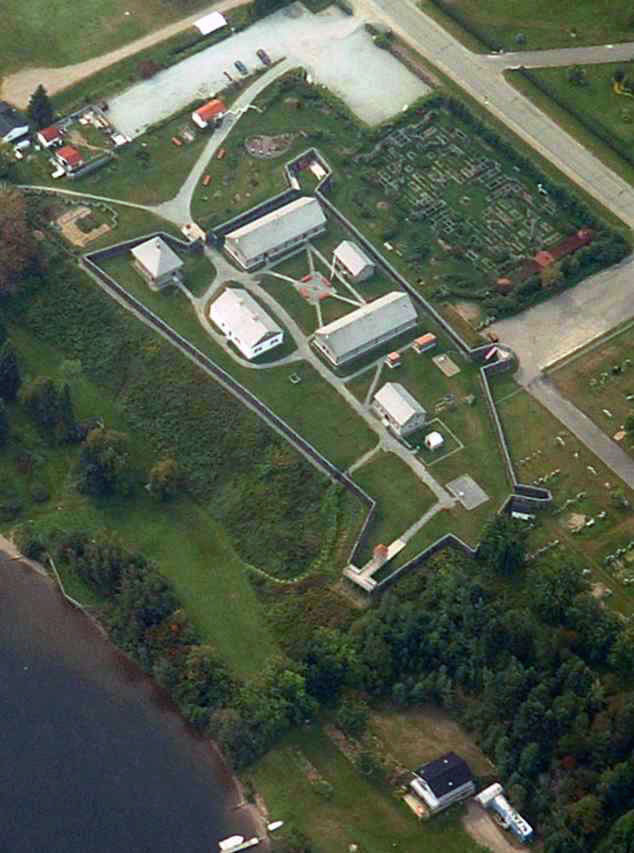
- Fort-Ingall in Cabano

- Coat of arms
- Interactive map of Ville de Cabano
- Coordinates: 47.68°N 68.88°W
- Country: Canada
- Province: Quebec
- MRC: Témiscouata
- City: Témiscouata-sur-le-Lac
- Established: 1880
- Disestablished: 5 May 2010 (merged)

Area
  - Total: 121.78 km^{2} (47.02 sq mi)

Population (2021)^{[1]}
  - Total: 3,400
- Time zone: UTC-5 (EST)
  - Summer (DST): UTC-4 (EDT)
- Postal Code: G0L 1E0

Cabano is a former city in Témiscouata Regional County Municipality within the Bas-Saint-Laurent region of Quebec, Canada. It is situated on Lake Témiscouata on Autoroute 85. On May 5, 2010, it merged with Notre-Dame-du-Lac to form the new city of Témiscouata-sur-le-Lac.

In the 2021 census, Cabano had a population of 2,419 people.

== History ==
At first, Cabano was called Poste du Lac or Fort Ingall. It became Saint-Mathias-de-Cabano in 1907, then the municipal village of Cabano in 1923, and finally, the city of Cabano in 1962.

On May 9, 1950, a major fire destroyed 125 houses in the city.

TFI International, Canada's largest trucking company, was founded in Cabano.

== Notable people ==
- Pierre Bérubé, researcher and author
- Patrice Laplante, member of the National Assembly of Quebec
- Ingrid St-Pierre, singer-songwriter
- Paul Triquet, recipient of the Victoria Cross for actions in Italy during the Second World War
