= Dégelis =

- City
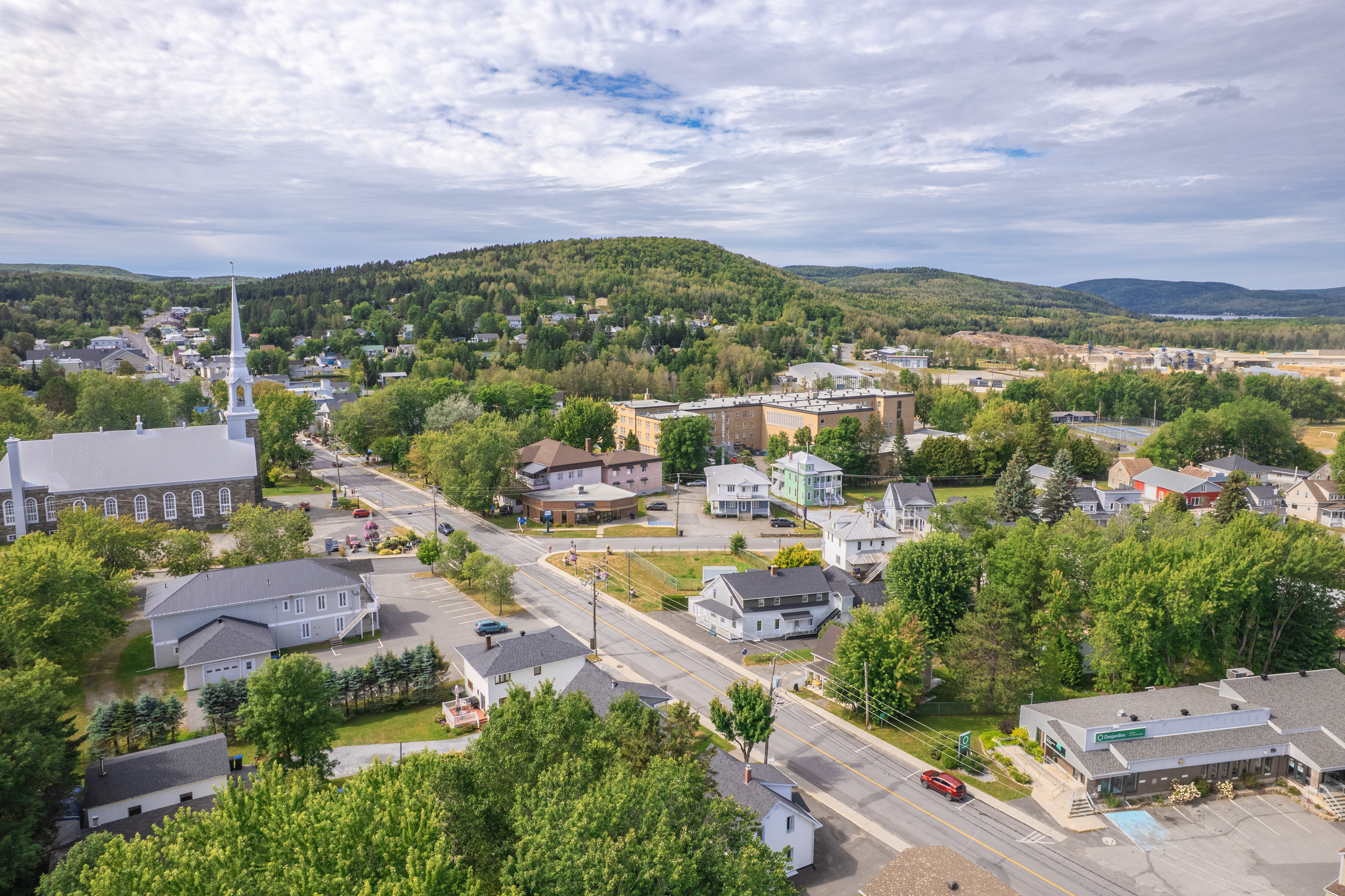
- Aerial view of Dégelis

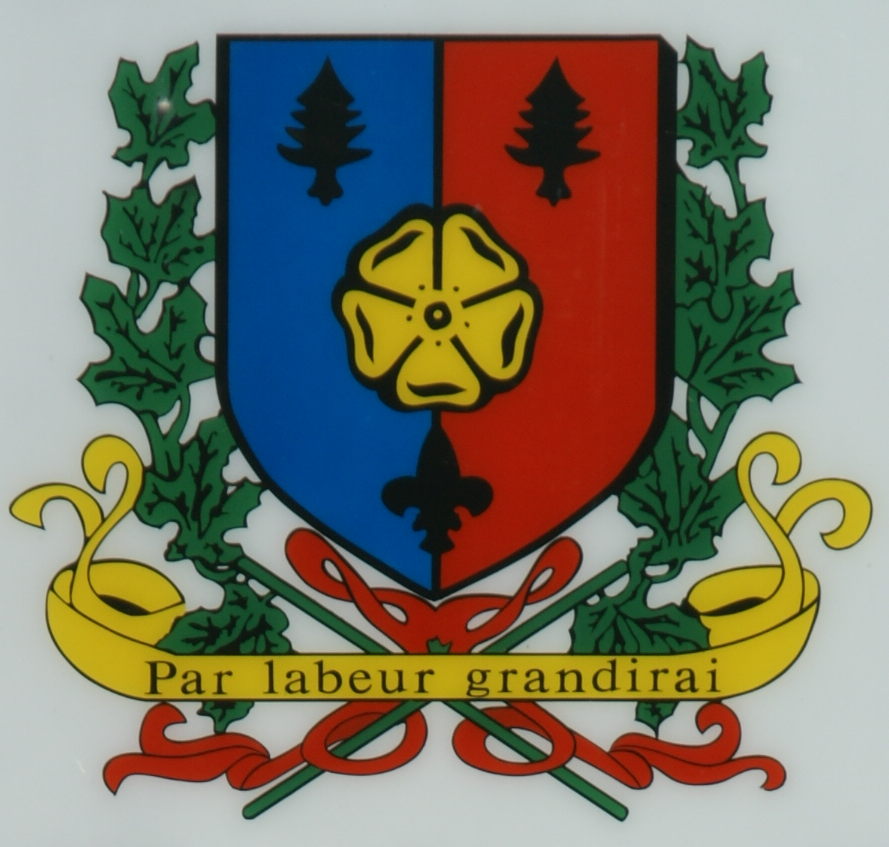
- Coat of arms
- Motto: Par labeur grandirai ("By work I will grow")
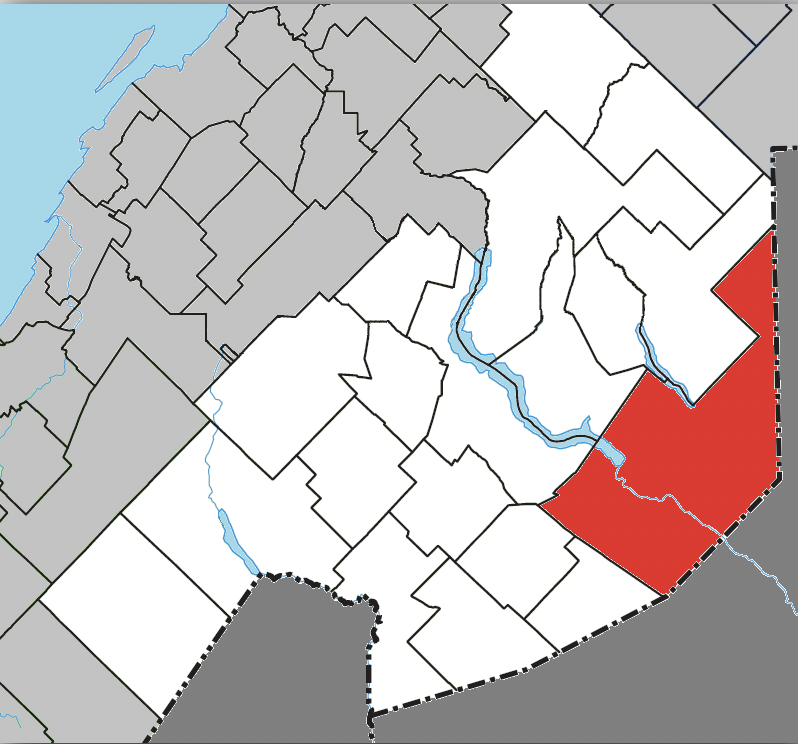
- Location within Témiscouata RCM

- Location in eastern Quebec
- Coordinates: 47.55°N 68.65°W
- Country: Canada
- Province: Quebec
- Region: Bas-Saint-Laurent
- RCM: Témiscouata
- Settled: 1880
- Constituted: December 13, 1969

Government
  - Mayor: Gustave Pelletier
  - Federal riding: Côte-du-Sud—Rivière-du-Loup—Kataskomiq—Témiscouata
  - Prov. riding: Rivière-du-Loup–Témiscouata–Les Basques

Area
  - City: 568.00 km^{2} (219.31 sq mi)
  - Land: 556.78 km^{2} (214.97 sq mi)
  - Urban: 2.17 km^{2} (0.84 sq mi)

Population (2021)
  - City: 2,884
  - Density: 5.2/km^{2} (13/sq mi)
  - Urban: 1,751
  - Urban density: 807.7/km^{2} (2,092/sq mi)
  - Pop 2016–2021: ▲0.7%
  - Dwellings: 1,518
- Time zone: UTC−5 (EST)
  - Summer (DST): UTC−4 (EDT)
- Postal code(s): G5T 2G3
- Area codes: 418 and 581
- Highways A-85 (TCH): R-295
- Website: ville.degelis.qc.ca

Dégelis (French pronunciation: [deʒli]) is a city in Témiscouata Regional County Municipality within the Bas-Saint-Laurent region of Quebec. Its population in the Canada 2021 Census was 2,884. The Madawaska River flows from Lake Témiscouata, through Degelis, to join the Saint John River at 32 kilometres (20 mi) to the east at Edmundston, New Brunswick.

Located on the banks of the Madawaska River (Saint John River), the city owes its name to a physical phenomenon: a zone of the river located in front the city, that never freezes. A Dégelis, in Old French, means a zone on the water free of ice (which is the phenomenon observed in Dégelis), a local winter thaw (no apparent reason), meaning an opening in the ice during the seasonal thawing.

The area corresponding to Dégelis is named Dégelé (English: thawed) in a report by Joseph Bouchette in 1815. The spelling at the time varies considerably. Clerical and administrative documents dating from 1858 to 1878 refer to the parish under the name Dégely, Ste. Rose Dégely, or (Sainte-Rose-du) Dégeli. Names "Sainte-Rose-du-Dégel" and "Dègelis" were also used for a period.

The inhabitants are appointed Dégelisiens for males and Dégelisiennes for females.

== History ==
Dégelis was founded in 1885 and its initial name was Sainte-Rose du Dégelé. Before its foundation, it was a military fort used to defend Canada's border with United States. Four families of British soldiers lived in two locations in the territory of the current city from 1814 to 1823 . In 1839, the construction of the fort began on the current city of Dégelis. The small fort was part of a series of forts which included Fort Ingall. Soldiers and settlers inhabited the fort and its surrounding area. Some settlers remained in the region after the Aroostook War.

The catholic mission Sainte-Rose-du-Dégelé was founded in 1860. The foundation's mission coincides with the beginning of colonization of the territory then known as Le Dégely.

The mission Catholic founded in 1860 took the name of "Sainte-Rose-du-Dégelé. The choice of Sainte-Rose as a protective was conducted by Langevin, bishop of Rimouski from 1867 to 1891 in honor of Rose Marquis, benefactress of the mission. The parish canonically was erected in 1885 and the municipality of parish was officially created the same year kept the same name. This does not prevent Le Naturaliste Canadien (English: The Canadian Naturalist), a scientific publication, refer to them as the Sainte-Rose-du-Dégelis in 1882. The post office of the place was called Sainte-Rose-du-Dégelé since 1879 and kept it until 1968. In fact, 1967, the name of the municipality was changed to Sainte-Rose-du-Dégelis for lexical considerations. In 1969, the name was shortened to Dégelis when the place received town status.

== Geography ==
The town is situated on Autoroute 85, also known as the Trans-Canada Highway, close to the Quebec–New Brunswick border.

Dégelis is located on the south slope of St. Lawrence River in 290 kilometres (180 mi) southeast of Quebec City and 500 kilometres (310 mi) southwest of Gaspé near the border with New Brunswick. Most important cities near Dégelis are Rivière-du-Loup in 85 kilometres (53 mi) northeast, La Pocatière in 150 kilometres (93 mi) to the west, and Edmundston in New Brunswick to 35 kilometres (22 mi) southeast. Dégelis territory covers an area of 562.84 square kilometres (217.31 sq mi).

City Dégelis is in the Témiscouata Regional County Municipality in administrative region of the Bas-Saint-Laurent. Parish Dégelis is part of the Archdiocese of Rimouski.

== Demographics ==
Historical Census Data – Dégelis, Quebec
| Year | Pop. | ±% |
|---|---|---|
| 1891 | 800 | — |
| 1901 | 963 | +20.4% |
| 1911 | 1,325 | +37.6% |
| 1921 | 1,629 | +22.9% |
| 1931 | 1,882 | +15.5% |
| 1941 | 1,876 | −0.3% |
| 1951 | 2,393 | +27.6% |
| 1956 | 2,679 | +12.0% |
| 1961 | 2,864 | +6.9% |
| 1966 | 2,854 | −0.3% |
| 1971 | 3,046 | +6.7% |
| 1976 | 3,304 | +8.5% |
| 1981 | 3,477 | +5.2% |
| 1986 | 3,528 | +1.5% |
| 1991 | 3,350 | −5.0% |
| 1996 | 3,437 | +2.6% |
| 2001 | 3,317 | −3.5% |
| 2006 | 3,209 | −3.3% |
| 2011 | 3,051 | −4.9% |
| 2016 | 2,863 | −6.2% |
| 2021 | 2,884 | +0.7% |

In the 2021 Census of Population conducted by Statistics Canada, Dégelis had a population of 2,884 living in 1,385 of its 1,518 total private dwellings, a change of 0.7% from its 2016 population of 2,863. With a land area of 556.78 km^{2} (214.97 sq mi), it had a population density of 5.2/km^{2} (13.4/sq mi) in 2021.

Canada census – Dégelis community profile

| | 2021 | 2016 | 2011 |
| Population | 2,884 (+0.7% from 2016) | 2,863 (-6.2% from 2011) | 3,051 (-4.9% from 2006) |
| Land area | 556.78 km^{2} (214.97 sq mi) | 557.05 km^{2} (215.08 sq mi) | 556.64 km^{2} (214.92 sq mi) |
| Population density | 5.2/km^{2} (13/sq mi) | 5.1/km^{2} (13/sq mi) | 5.5/km^{2} (14/sq mi) |
| Median age | 55.2 (M: 54.4, F: 56.4) | 53.2 (M: 51.8, F: 54.4) | 49.6 (M: 49.0, F: 50.1) |
| Private dwellings | 1,518 (total) 1,385 (occupied) | 1,530 (total) | 1,517 (total) |
| Median household income | $57,200 | $46,362 | $39,682 |

References: 2021 2016 2011

Canada Census Mother Tongue – Dégelis, Quebec
| Census | Total | French | | | English | | | French & English | | | Other | | |
| Year | Responses | Count | Trend | Pop % | Count | Trend | Pop % | Count | Trend | Pop % | Count | Trend | Pop % |
| 2021 | 2,875 | 2,835 | ▲0.2% | 98.6% | 30 | ▲100.0% | 1.0% | 15 | ▲200.0% | 0.5% | 0 | ▼100.0% | 0.0% |
| 2016 | 2,860 | 2,830 | ▼4.1% | 99.0% | 15 | 0.0% | 0.5% | 5 | 0.0% | 0.2% | 5 | 0.0% | 0.2% |
| 2011 | 2,975 | 2,950 | ▼3.6% | 99.2% | 15 | ▼25.0% | 0.5% | 5 | ▼50.0% | 0.2% | 5 | ▼50.0% | 0.2% |
| 2006 | 3,100 | 3,060 | ▼4.2% | 98.7% | 20 | ▲ n/a% | 0.7% | 10 | ▼66.7% | 0.3% | 10 | 0.0% | 0.3% |
| 2001 | 3,235 | 3,195 | ▼4.1% | 98.8% | 0 | ▼100.0% | 0.0% | 30 | ▲200.0% | 0.9% | 10 | ▲ n/a% | 0.3% |
| 1996 | 3,350 | 3,330 | n/a | 99.4% | 10 | n/a | 0.3% | 10 | n/a | 0.3% | 0 | n/a | 0.0% |

- Religious affiliation:
  - Christian 88.0%
  - No religious affiliation 12.0%
- Experienced labour force:
  - Agriculture, forestry, fishing and hunting 5.9%
  - Mining, quarrying, and oil and gas extraction 1.8%
  - Construction 4.3%
  - Manufacturing 5.5%
  - Wholesale trade 1.8%
  - Retail trade 11.9%
  - Transportation and warehousing 4.3%
  - Information and cultural industries 0.7%
  - Finance and insurance 2.5%
  - Professional, scientific and technical services 4.0%
  - Administrative and support, waste management and remediation services 3.2%
  - Educational services 6.1%
  - Health care and social assistance 15.5%
  - Arts, entertainment and recreation 1.8%
  - Accommodation and food services 5.8%
  - Other services (except public administration) 4.3%
  - Public administration 2.5%

== Economy ==
The economy of Dégelis revolves mainly around the forest industry. The city is home to a sawmill which produces hardwood briquettes of maple, oak, beech, and ash. The municipality has reduced hours of operation.

== Government ==
Local government comprises a mayor and councillors. The current mayor is Gustave Pelletier.

List of former mayors:

- Émilien Nadeau (1994-2009)
- Claude Lavoie (2009-2013)
- Normand Morin (2013-2021)
- Gustave Pelletier (2021–present)

== See also ==
- Iroquois River (Saint John River)
- List of cities in Quebec
