= Lake Témiscouata =

Lake in Quebec, Canada

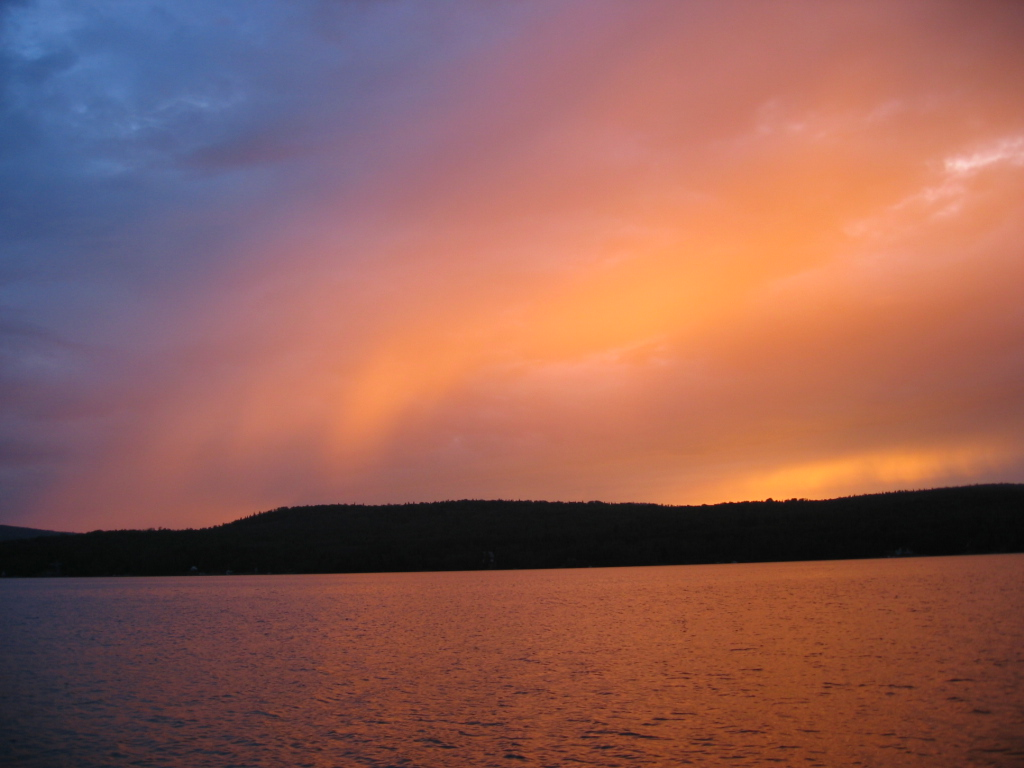
- Rain in the sun

- Location within Quebec
- Location: Témiscouata Regional County Municipality, Quebec
- Coordinates: 47°40′N 68°50′W
- Primary outflows: Madawaska River
- Basin countries: Canada
- Max. length: 45 km (28 mi)
- Max. width: 5 km (3.1 mi)
- Settlements: Témiscouata-sur-le-Lac

Lake Témiscouata (French pronunciation: [temiskwata]) is a lake in the Témiscouata region of southeastern Quebec, Canada. It is 40 km long, with a total area of 66 km^{2}. The Madawaska River flows from this lake to the Saint John River.

The cities of Témiscouata-sur-le-Lac, Dégelis and Saint-Juste-du-Lac are located on this lake. Forestry is a major industry in this area.

The Petit Témis Interprovincial Bicycle Path, runs from Rivière-du-Loup, Quebec to Edmundston, New Brunswick, following an abandoned railway line along the lake.

The lake is theorized to be the inspiration for the nearby parish of Saint-Louis-du-Ha! Ha!. One explanation suggests the archaic French word haha, here meaning an unexpected obstacle or abruptly ending path, as the lake is an extremely long and particularly formidable obstacle to travel.
