= Kamouraska-Témiscouata =

Former provincial electoral district in Quebec, Canada

Coordinates: 47.65°N 68.87°W

Quebec electoral district

Defunct provincial electoral district
- Legislature: National Assembly of Quebec
- District created: 1972
- District abolished: 2011
- First contested: 1973
- Last contested: 2010 (by-election)

Demographics
- Population (2006): 44,307
- Electors (2008): 34,426
- Area (km²): 6,153.87
- Census division(s): Kamouraska, Témiscouata
- Census subdivision(s): Auclair, Dégelis, Kamouraska, La Pocatière, Lejeune, Mont-Carmel, Packington, Pohénégamook, Rivière-Bleue, Rivière-Ouelle, Saint-Alexandre-de-Kamouraska, Saint-André, Sainte-Anne-de-la-Pocatière, Saint-Athanase, Saint-Bruno-de-Kamouraska, Saint-Denis, Saint-Elzéar-de-Témiscouata, Saint-Eusèbe, Saint-Gabriel-Lalemant, Saint-Germain, Sainte-Hélène, Saint-Honoré-de-Témiscouata, Saint-Jean-de-la-Lande, Saint-Joseph-de-Kamouraska, Saint-Juste-du-Lac, Saint-Louis-du-Ha! Ha!, Sainte-Louise, Saint-Marc-du-Lac-Long, Saint-Michel-du-Squatec, Saint-Onésime-d'Ixworth, Saint-Pacôme, Saint-Pascal, Saint-Philippe-de-Néri, Saint-Pierre-de-Lamy, Saint-Roch-des-Aulnaies, Témiscouata-sur-le-Lac; Petit-Lac-Sainte-Anne, Picard

Kamouraska-Témiscouata (French pronunciation: [kamuʁaska temiskwata]) is a former provincial electoral district in Quebec, Canada, that elected members to the National Assembly of Quebec. As of its final election, it included the municipalities of Kamouraska, La Pocatière, Saint-Athanase, Packington, Dégelis and Témiscouata-sur-le-Lac.

It was created for the 1973 election from Kamouraska and parts of L'Islet and Témiscouata. Its final election was in 2008. It was dissolved prior to the 2012 election and replaced by the Rivière-du-Loup–Témiscouata and Côte-du-Sud electoral districts.

== Members of the National Assembly ==
Legislature	Years	Member	Party
Riding created from Kamouraska, L'Islet and Témiscouata
30th	1973–1976	Jean-Marie Pelletier	Liberal
31st	1976–1981	Léonard Lévesque	Parti Québécois
32nd	1981–1985	Léonard Lévesque	Parti Québécois
33rd	1985–1989	France Dionne	Liberal
34th	1989–1994	France Dionne	Liberal
35th	1994–1997	France Dionne	Liberal
35th	1997–1998	Claude Béchard	Liberal
36th	1998–2003	Claude Béchard	Liberal
37th	2003–2007	Claude Béchard	Liberal
38th	2007–2008	Claude Béchard	Liberal
39th	2008–2010	Claude Béchard	Liberal
39th	2010–2012	André Simard	Parti Québécois
Dissolved into Rivière-du-Loup–Témiscouata and Côte-du-Sud

== Electoral results ==
Quebec provincial by-election, November 29, 2010
Party	Candidate	Votes	%	±%
Parti Québécois	André Simard	7,213	36.85	+15.70
Liberal	France Dionne	7,017	35.85	-17.85
Action démocratique	Gérald Beaulieu	4,509	23.03	+1.47
Québec solidaire	Serge Proulx	522	2.67	-0.27
Green	Frédéric Brophy Nolan	314	1.60	–
Total valid votes		19,575	98.51	–
Rejected and declined votes		296	1.49	–
Turnout		19,871	57.65	-2.90
Electors on the lists		34,470	–	–
Parti Québécois gain from Liberal		Swing		+16.78
Source: Official Results, Le Directeur général des élections du Québec.

2008 Quebec general election
Party	Candidate	Votes	%	±%
Liberal	Claude Béchard	11,048	53.70	+13.98
Action démocratique	Ian Sénéchal	4,436	21.56	-15.12
Parti Québécois	Michel Forget	4,351	21.15	+1.73
Québec solidaire	Manon Côté	604	2.94	+0.83
Independent	Alexis Plourde	134	0.65	–
Total valid votes		20,573	–	–
Liberal hold		Swing		+14.55
Source: Official Results, Le Directeur général des élections du Québec.

2007 Quebec general election
Party	Candidate	Votes	%	±%
Liberal	Claude Béchard	9,826	39.72	-6.03
Action démocratique	Gérald Beaulieu	9,074	36.68	+10.27
Parti Québécois	Nancy Gagnon	4,804	19.42	-6.27
Québec solidaire	Céline Tremblay	521	2.11	-
Green	Louise Lebel	515	2.08	+0.89

2003 Quebec general election
Party	Candidate	Votes	%	±%
Liberal	Claude Béchard	11,266	45.75	+2.26
Action démocratique	Pierre Lévesque	6,504	26.41	+14.25
Parti Québécois	Harold LeBel	6,326	25.69	-17.37
Green	Guy Duguay	293	1.19	-
Independent	Raymond Robert	238	0.97	-

1998 Quebec general election
Party	Candidate	Votes	%	±%
Liberal	Claude Béchard	11,259	43.49	-8.46
Parti Québécois	Denis Simard	11,149	43.06	+5.45
Action démocratique	Arsène Gendron	3,149	12.16	+2.95
Socialist Democracy	Jérôme Frédéric Bouchard	334	1.29	+0.06

Quebec provincial by-election, October 6, 1997
Party	Candidate	Votes	%	±%
Liberal	Claude Béchard	9,946	51.95	+9.26
Parti Québécois	Denis Simard	7,201	37.61	-3.49
Action démocratique	Carl Raymond	1,762	9.21	-4.05
Socialist Democracy	Jérôme Frédéric Bouchard	236	1.23	-1.72

1995 Quebec referendum
Side	Votes	%
Oui	15,632	52.66
Non	14 055	47.34

1994 Quebec general election
Party	Candidate	Votes	%	±%
Liberal	France Dionne	10,373	42.69	-12.98
Parti Québécois	Hélène Alarie	9,987	41.10	+4.00
Action démocratique	Yvan Ouellet	3,223	13.26	–
New Democratic	André Bourgoin	717	2.95	–

1992 Charlottetown Accord referendum
Side	Votes	%
Non	14,734	62.12
Oui	8,985	37.88

1989 Quebec general election
Party	Candidate	Votes	%	±%
Liberal	France Dionne	12,354	55.67	-1.72
Parti Québécois	Claudette Dorval	8,233	37.10	+0.92
Green	Marie-Hélène Lemieux	1,605	7.23	+4.35

1980 Quebec referendum
Side	Votes	%
Non	13,920	56.03
Oui	10,922	43.97

== See also ==
- List of Quebec provincial electoral districts
- Canadian provincial electoral districts
