= Baker River North (Quebec-New Brunswick) =

Barker River North

Location
- Country: Canada
- Provinces: New Brunswick; Quebec

Physical characteristics
- Source
  - location: Lac à Pelletier, Packington, Temiscouata Regional County Municipality, Bas-Saint-Laurent, Quebec
  - coordinates: 47°30′51″N 68°49′41″W
  - elevation: 322 m (1,056 ft)
- Mouth
  - location: Baker River, New Brunswick, Baker-Brook, New Brunswick, Madawaska County, New Brunswick
  - coordinates: 47°22′46″N 68°36′46″W
  - elevation: 174 m (571 ft)
- Length: 28.1 km (17.5 mi)

Basin features
- Tributaries
  - left: (from the mouth) Little brook Baker, Dubé brook, Beaulieu brook

The Baker River North is a tributary of the Baker River, flowing in Canada:

- Quebec: in administrative region of Bas-Saint-Laurent, in Temiscouata Regional County Municipality, in the municipality of Packington, Quebec and Saint-Jean-de-la-Lande, Quebec;
- New Brunswick (northwest part): Madawaska County, municipality of Baker Brook, New Brunswick.

== Geography ==
The "Baker River North" takes its source in "Lake Pelletier" (diameter: 0.1 kilometres (0.062 mi); height: 323 metres (1,060 ft)) which is the southwest side of the road North 8th and 9th, in the municipality of Packington, Quebec. This source is located at:

- 16.3 kilometres (10.1 mi) west of the border between Quebec and New Brunswick;
- 7.0 kilometres (4.3 mi) north of pointe North of Lake Méruimticook which straddles the border between Quebec and New Brunswick;
- 3.8 kilometres (2.4 mi) northwest from the village center of Packington, Quebec which is located in Quebec.

From the "lake Pelletier", the "Baker River North" flows over 28.1 kilometres (17.5 mi) as follow:

- 3.7 kilometres (2.3 mi) to the southeast, along the southwest side of the North 8th and 9th rank road to the bridge at Lake Road Jerry;
- 6.9 kilometres (4.3 mi) to the southeast, to the boundary of the municipality of Saint-Jean-de-la-Lande, Quebec;
- 6.0 kilometres (3.7 mi) (or 4.4 kilometres (2.7 mi) in direct line) to the southeast in Saint-Jean-de-la-Lande, Quebec to the road Lac Baker that Southwest side of the cutting of the village of Saint-Jean-de-la-Lande, Quebec;
- 3.3 kilometres (2.1 mi) to the southeast to Main Street (8th and 9th South Road rank);
- 0.5 kilometres (0.31 mi) eastwards to "Little Baker Creek";
- 1.5 kilometres (0.93 mi) (or 1.1 kilometres (0.68 mi) in direct line) to the East, to the border between Quebec and New Brunswick;
- 6.2 kilometres (3.9 mi) (or 3.1 kilometres (1.9 mi) in direct line) to Southeast in the Madawaska County at New Brunswick, until its confluence.

The "Baker River North" flows into a river bend on the north bank of the Baker River (New Brunswick) at Baker Brook, New Brunswick, in Madawaska County.

From the confluence of "Baker River North", the Baker River (New Brunswick) flows Southeast to the North shore of Saint John River (Bay of Fundy). It passes through the New Brunswick to the southeast to the north bank of the Bay of Fundy, which opens to the southwest in the Atlantic Ocean.

The confluence of the "Baker River North" is located at:

- 11.7 kilometres (7.3 mi) Northwest of the confluence of the Baker River (New Brunswick) which flows into the city of Edmundston;
- 3.1 kilometres (1.9 mi) South of border between Quebec and New Brunswick.

== Toponymy ==
The term "Baker" is an English original family surname.

== See also ==
- Packington, Quebec, a municipality of Quebec
- Saint-Jean-de-la-Lande, Quebec, a municipality of Quebec
- Temiscouata Regional County Municipality, a RCM Quebec
- Baker Brook, New Brunswick, a municipality of New Brunswick
- Madawaska County, a county of New Brunswick
- Baker River (New Brunswick)
- Saint John River (Bay of Fundy)
- List of rivers of Quebec
- List of rivers of New Brunswick
