= Savane River (Caldwell River tributary) =

River in Charlevoix Regional County Municipality, Quebec, Canada

- Location within Quebec

Location
- Country: Canada
- Province: Quebec
- Region: Bas-Saint-Laurent
- Regional County Municipality: Témiscouata Regional County Municipality
- Municipality: Saint-Louis-du-Ha! Ha!, Témiscouata-sur-le-Lac and Saint-Pierre-de-Lamy

Physical characteristics
- Source: Savane Lake
  - location: Saint-Louis-du-Ha! Ha!
  - coordinates: 47°41′56″N 68°59′48″W
  - elevation: 264 m
- Mouth: Caldwell River (Témiscouata Lake)
  - location: Saint-Pierre-de-Lamy
  - coordinates: 47°44′28″N 68°59′04″W
  - elevation: 251 m
- Length: 7.0 km (4.3 mi)

The Savane River flows through the southern part of the Gaspé peninsula, crossing the municipalities of Saint-Louis-du-Ha! Ha!, The sector of Cabano of the city of Témiscouata-sur-le-Lac and the municipality of Saint-Pierre-de-Lamy, in the Témiscouata Regional County Municipality, in the administrative region of Bas-Saint-Laurent, in the province of Quebec, in Canada.

The Savane River flows on the south bank of the Caldwell River. The latter flows east to the west shore of lake Témiscouata which in turn flows south-east into the Madawaska River. The latter flows southeast to the north shore of the Saint John River in New Brunswick. The latter flows southeast through all of New Brunswick and spills out onto the north shore of the Bay of Fundy which opens southwest to the Atlantic Ocean.

The upper part of the Savane river is served by the route du Vieux Chemin.

== Geography ==
The Savane River rises at Savane Lake (length: 1.2 kilometres (0.75 mi); altitude: 264 metres (866 ft)), the mouth of which is located on the northeast side of the lake, in the municipality of Saint-Louis-du-Ha! Ha!. It flows mainly in the forest zone and in the marsh zone at the end of the course. The northern mouth of Savane Lake is located at:

- 3.9 kilometres (2.4 mi) east of the limit of the municipality of Saint-Honoré;
- 5.8 kilometres (3.6 mi) west of the west shore of lake Témiscouata;
- 4.7 kilometres (2.9 mi) south of the confluence of the Savane river;
- 8.9 kilometres (5.5 mi) west of the village center of Cabano;
- 28.0 kilometres (17.4 mi) north-west of the mouth of Lake Témiscouata.

The Savane River flows over 7.0 kilometres (4.3 mi) divided into the following segments:

- 2.4 kilometres (1.5 mi) north-east, passing east of a mountain whose summit reaches 395 metres (1,296 ft), up to the limit of the sector of Cabano of the city of Témiscouata-sur-le-Lac;
- 1.3 kilometres (0.81 mi) northerly in the sector of Cabano, up to the limit of the municipality Saint-Pierre-de-Lamy;
- 3.4 kilometres (2.1 mi) northwards in Saint-Pierre-de-Lamy, passing west of a mountain whose summit reaches 387 metres (1,270 ft), to the confluence of the river.

The Savane River flows onto the south bank of the upper part of the Caldwell River, in the municipality of Saint-Pierre-de-Lamy, either at a location where Sload Lake forms a 0.9 kilometres (0.56 mi) arm towards the southeast, thus constituting the head of the river. This confluence is located at:

- 0.8 metres (2 ft 7 in) west of the limit of sector Cabano of the town of Témiscouata-sur-le-Lac;
- 5.3 kilometres (3.3 mi) west of Lake Témiscouata;
- 10.1 kilometres (6.3 mi) north-west of Cabano town center;
- 5.9 kilometres (3.7 mi) south-east of the village center of Saint-Pierre-de-Lamy.

== Toponymy ==
The term "Savannah" means a plain of tall grass; which characterizes this small valley, located between Lac Sload and Lac Savane. In this sector, the term "Savane" is linked to the lake, the Savane river and the Petite rivière Savane (Témiscouata Lake).

The toponym “Rivière Savane” was formalized on December 5, 1968, at the Commission de toponymie du Québec.

== See also ==
- List of rivers of Quebec
