= France Dionne =

Canadian politician (born 1953)

Member of the National Assembly of Quebec
- In office December 2, 1985 – May 2, 1997
- Preceded by: Léonard Lévesque
- Succeeded by: Claude Béchard
- Constituency: Kamouraska-Témiscouata

Personal details
- Born: August 23, 1953 (age 73) Rivière-du-Loup, Quebec, Canada
- Party: Liberal

France Dionne (born August 23, 1953) is a politician from Quebec, Canada. She served as a member of the National Assembly of Quebec from 1985 to 1997 sitting with the Liberal caucus in government and opposition.

== Political career ==
Dionne ran as a candidate under the Quebec Liberal Party banner in the 1985 Quebec general election. She was elected winning her first of three terms in office and picking up the seat of Kamouraska-Témiscouata for her party. Dionne easily held her seat in the 1989 Quebec general election winning well over half the popular vote.

Dionne's bid for a third term in office would be a struggle. She held her seat against Parti Québécois candidate Hélène Alarie by a margin of nearly 400 votes. She resigned her seat on May 2, 1997 to run as a federal Liberal candidate in the 1997 Canadian federal election.

Dionne ran in a hotly contested five-way race in the electoral district of Kamouraska—Rivière-du-Loup—Temiscouata—Les Basques. She was defeated by incumbent Bloc Québécois Member of Parliament Paul Crête finishing a very close second by a couple thousand votes and slightly ahead of former Member of Parliament André Plourde.

Dionne is attempting a political come back, she ran for another term in provincial office under the Liberal banner in the Kamouraska-Témiscouata by-election of November 29, 2010 but lost to the Parti Québécois candidate André Simard.
