= Brisson River =

Rivière Brisson may refer to:

- Brisson River (Rimouski River tributary), a tributary of the Rimouski River in La Trinité-des-Monts, Quebec, Canada
- Brisson River (rivière aux Anglais), a tributary of the Rivière aux Anglais in Rivière-aux-Outardes, Quebec, Canada
- Brisson River (rivière du Grand Touradi tributary), a tributary of the rivière du Grand Touradi in Esprit-Saint, Quebec, Canada
