= Lejeune, Quebec =

Lejeune
- Municipality
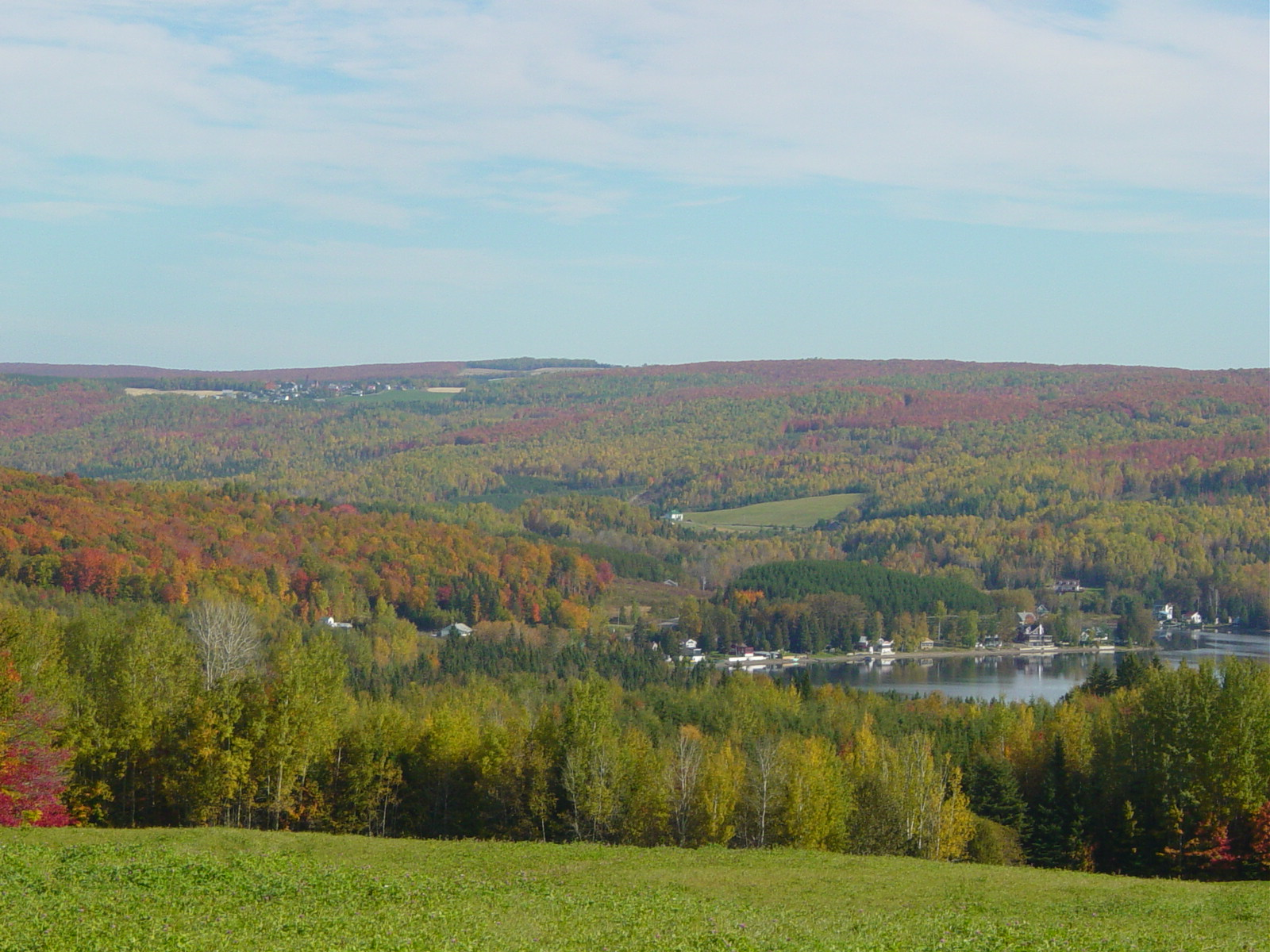

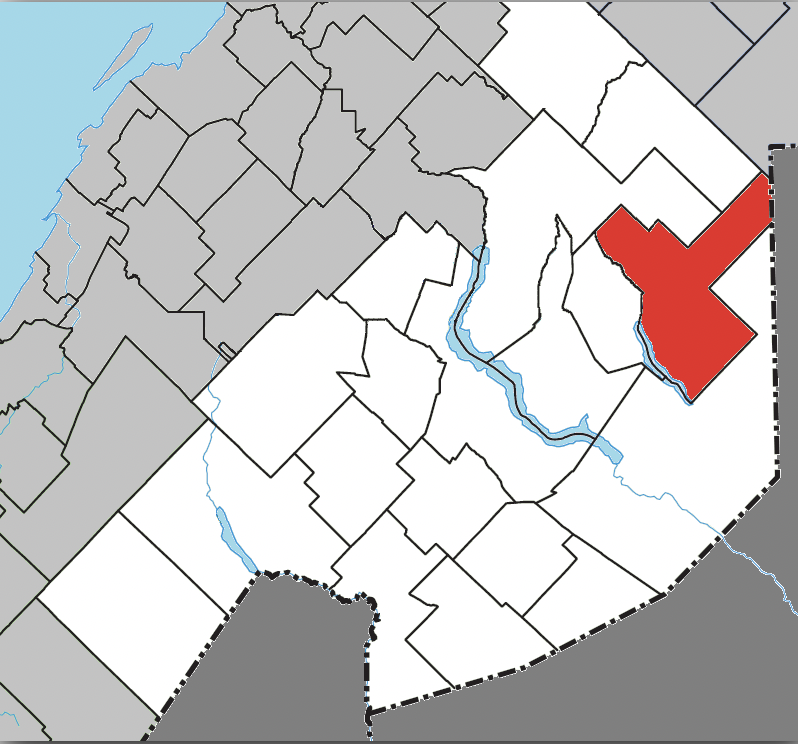
- Location within Témiscouata RCM

- Location in eastern Quebec
- Coordinates: 47°46′N 68°35′W
- Country: Canada
- Province: Quebec
- Region: Bas-Saint-Laurent
- RCM: Témiscouata
- Constituted: January 1, 1964
- Named for: Paul Le Jeune(unconfirmed)

Government
  - Mayor: Zachary Leboeuf
  - Federal riding: Côte-du-Sud—Rivière-du-Loup—Kataskomiq—Témiscouata
  - Prov. riding: Rivière-du-Loup–Témiscouata–Les Basques

Area
  - Total: 273.50 km^{2} (105.60 sq mi)
  - Land: 270.13 km^{2} (104.30 sq mi)

Population (2021)
  - Total: 246
  - Density: 0.9/km^{2} (2.3/sq mi)
  - Pop 2016-2021: ▼6.1%
  - Dwellings: 165
- Time zone: UTC−5 (EST)
  - Summer (DST): UTC−4 (EDT)
- Postal code(s): G0L 1S0
- Area codes: 418 and 581
- Highways: R-295
- Website: www.municipalite lejeune.com

Lejeune (French pronunciation: [ləʒœn]) is a municipality in Quebec, Canada.

== History ==
The municipality was officially founded on January 1, 1964, under the name Saint-Godard-de-Lejeune. In 1991, the name was shortened to simply Lejeune.

Lejeune was one of the host communities for the 5th Acadian World Congress in 2014.

== Geography ==
The Squatec River forms the north-western boundary of the municipality, where it flows to its confluence with the Touladi River at Saint-Michel-du-Squatec. The Owen River, a tributary of Grand lac Squatec, flows southwards through the municipality from its source in the north-east.

== See also ==
- List of municipalities in Quebec
