= Touladi =

Touladi may refer to:

- Touladi, a common name for Lake trout (Salvelinus namaycush)
- Touladi River, a tributary of the Romaine River in the Côte-Nord region of the Canadian province of Quebec
