= Saint-Jean-de-la-Lande, Quebec =

Saint-Jean-de-la-Lande
- Municipality
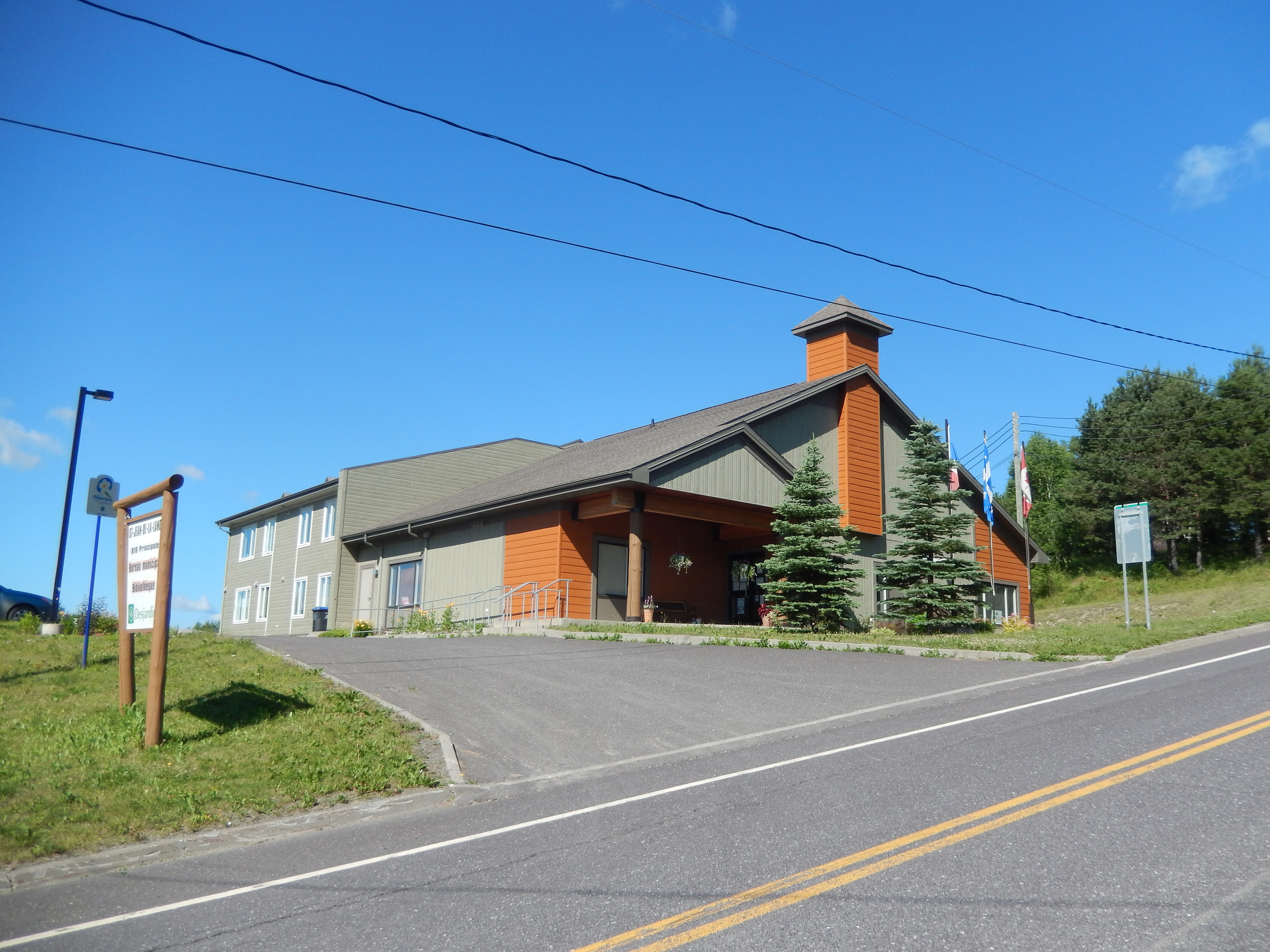
- Town hall

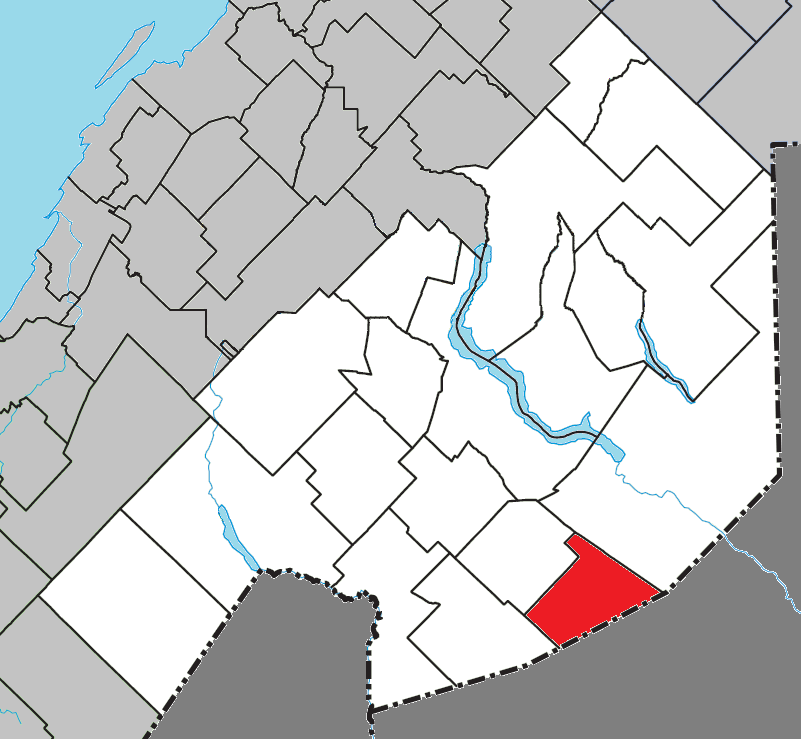
- Location within Témiscouata RCM

- Location in eastern Quebec
- Coordinates: 47°26′N 68°41′W
- Country: Canada
- Province: Quebec
- Region: Bas-Saint-Laurent
- RCM: Témiscouata
- Constituted: January 1, 1965

Government
  - Mayor: Claude Gallant
  - Federal riding: Côte-du-Sud—Rivière-du-Loup—Kataskomiq—Témiscouata
  - Prov. riding: Rivière-du-Loup–Témiscouata–Les Basques

Area
  - Total: 108.60 km^{2} (41.93 sq mi)
  - Land: 107.03 km^{2} (41.32 sq mi)

Population (2021)
  - Total: 232
  - Density: 2.2/km^{2} (5.7/sq mi)
  - Pop 2016-2021: ▼6.5%
  - Dwellings: 178
- Time zone: UTC−5 (EST)
  - Summer (DST): UTC−4 (EDT)
- Postal code(s): G0L 3N0
- Area codes: 418 and 581
- Highways: No major routes
- Website: www.saintjeandelalande.ca

Saint-Jean-de-la-Lande (French pronunciation: [sɛ̃ ʒɑ̃ də la lɑ̃d]) is a municipality in Témiscouata Regional County Municipality in the Bas-Saint-Laurent region of Quebec, Canada.

== History ==
Between 1915 and 1918, a group of students surveyed part of Robinson Township. In the early 1920s, a few New Brunswick squatters settled there, quickly followed by families from Sainte-Rose-du-Dégelé (now Dégelis), who occupied a strip of land along Baker Creek, then by people from Montreal, Quebec, Beauce and Bellechasse. In 1923, the mission of Saint-Maur was established, a name that recalls the proximity of the parish of Saint-Benoît-de-Packington, Saint Benedict of Nursia having been the teacher of Saint Maur (around 512–584). The Saint-Maur mission was installed near the Romain-Caron bridge on the right as you descend the Meruimticook River. The church was both school and church. Alcime Soucy's children (Eddy, Prime, Fred) attended it. It should also be added that two sawmills were in operation in the 1920s/1930s on the banks of the Méruimticook River a few meters from the Romain-Caron bridge on the site of the new bridge. The presence of these two mills stimulated the arrival of new settlers and the development of the St-Maur mission. One of the mills belonging to Mr. Thibeault left his name to this place which now bears the name of Lac Thibeault.

Long before the founding of Saint-Maur and St-Jean-de-la-Lande, inhabitants mainly from New Brunswick settled on the Quebec border in a place called Boundary (Border) or called the Coin. This town, straddling the border of the two provinces, has been inhabited since the end of the 1800s. The construction of the railway that passes through this place is at the origin of this development. A hotel, two general stores and a train station have already been in operation in Boundary.

From 1932, the name of the mission was changed to Saint-Jean-de-la-Lande, because of the canonization, in 1930, of the Norman martyr Jean de Lalande, who lived from about 1620 to 1646. The mission then moved his church to the hills of rang VIII and IX at its current location. Canonically erected in 1964, the parish will see its name retained to identify the municipality created the following year. This church was built by the first settlers such as Gratien Belzile and his brothers Alphonse and Paul-Émile. The lumber used to build the church was prepared by Damase Lang, a resident of Baker Lake, who at that time operated at the sawmill at Rang VIII and IX South on the New Brunswick and Quebec border.

In 2011, the municipality of Saint-Jean-de-la-Lande will lose one of its pioneers and former mayor of the parish: Robert Belzile, he arrived in 1932 aged 6 with his parents Charles Belzile, Adèle Thibault as well than his brothers and sisters: Alphonse, Jean-Charles, Gratien, Paul-Émile, Agnès, Germaine, Aurèle, Ivanhoe, Lina and Fernand. They were from Saint-Clément (Rivière-du-Loup county). Robert lived there for more than 79 years. He remained there all his life.

St-Jean-de-la-Lande has two major waterways on its territory, Lake Meruimticook and Lake Baker. In addition, rivers irrigate its deep valleys.

The Jeannois population is mainly composed of farmers, industrial workers and construction workers.

Saint-Jean-de-la-Lande is one of the localities organizing the fifth Acadian World Congress in 2014.

== Demographics ==
Canada census – Saint-Jean-de-la-Lande community profile

	2021	2016
Population	232 (-6.5% from 2016)	248 (-20.0% from 2011)
Land area	107.03 km^{2} (41.32 sq mi)	107.05 km^{2} (41.33 sq mi)
Population density	2.2/km^{2} (5.7/sq mi)	2.3/km^{2} (6.0/sq mi)
Median age	60.8 (M: 58.8, F: 62.0)	54.7 (M: 54.2, F: 54.9)
Private dwellings	178 (total) 126 (occupied)	167 (total)
Median household income	$.n/a	$.n/a

Notes: 2021 and 2016 Income data for this area has been suppressed for data quality or confidentiality reasons.
References: 2021 2016

== See also ==
- Temiscouata Regional County Municipality
- Branche à Jerry, a stream
- Baker River North (Quebec-New Brunswick)
- List of municipalities in Quebec

== See also ==
- Baker River (New Brunswick)
