= Claude Béchard =

Canadian politician (1969–2010)

Member of the National Assembly of Quebec
- In office October 6, 1997 – September 7, 2010
- Preceded by: France Dionne
- Succeeded by: André Simard
- Constituency: Kamouraska-Témiscouata

Personal details
- Born: June 29, 1969 Saint-Philippe-de-Néri, Quebec
- Died: September 7, 2010 (aged 41) Quebec City, Quebec
- Party: Liberal Party of Québec
- Cabinet: Minister of Agriculture, Fisheries and Food; Minister for Canadian Intergovernmental Affairs

Claude Béchard (June 29, 1969 – September 7, 2010) was a politician in Quebec, Canada. He served as Quebec Liberal Party Member of the National Assembly (MNA) for the riding of Kamouraska-Témiscouata in the Bas-Saint-Laurent region; as Minister of Agriculture, Fisheries and Food as well as the Minister for Canadian Intergovernmental Affairs, and previously the Minister of Natural Resources and Wildlife, Minister of Sustainable Development, Environment and Parks, Minister of Economic Development, Innovation and Export Trade and Ministry of Employment and Social Solidarity.

== Biography ==
=== Early life and career ===
Béchard was born in 1969 in Saint-Philippe-de-Néri. In 1991, he received a bachelor's degree in political science from Université Laval in Quebec City. He graduated with a master's degree in land planning and regional development in 1994. He began doctoral studies in public administration, but left it to work as a political adviser to Daniel Johnson, Jr. from 1993 to 1996. He became the vice-president of the Quebec Liberal Party in 1997 and in a by-election the same year was elected as a Member of the National Assembly of Quebec for the riding of Kamouraska-Témiscouata. He was re-elected in 1998 and 2003, the latter which gave his party the power. During the years in the opposition benches he served as critic for employment, labour, energy and education.

=== Quebec cabinet ===
When Jean Charest became Premier of Quebec in 2003, he was named the Minister of Employment, Social Solidarity and Family Welfare before a Cabinet shuffle caused by the departure of Yves Séguin as Finance Minister, promoted him to the position of Minister of Economic Development, Innovation and Export Trade in 2005. He occupied the position for one year before becoming Minister of Sustainable Development, Environment and Parks in 2006.

Soon after, Béchard became involved in a controversial plan to sell part of Mont Orford Provincial Park to a developer who planned to build condominiums. The plan was eventually cancelled. In addition, Béchard announced that Mont Orford Park would double in size as a national park.

Béchard was re-elected in the 2007 elections and named the Minister of Natural Resources and Wildlife replacing Pierre Corbeil who was defeated by the PQ's Alexis Wawanoloath. Line Beauchamp succeeded him as Minister of Environment.

=== Cancer, recovery, and death ===
On May 30, 2008, Béchard was hospitalized for persistent stomach pain. On June 9, 2008, he was diagnosed with pancreatic cancer. In addition, during the same year, his press secretary Nancy Michaud was kidnapped and later found murdered inside an abandoned home in Riviere-Ouelle.

Béchard recovered from his operation and was easily re-elected in the 2008 elections. On June 23, 2009, during a cabinet shuffle, Bechard was moved from the Natural Resources and Wildlife portfolios to Agriculture, Fisheries and Food replacing Laurent Lessard. Nathalie Normandeau replaced Béchard as Minister of Natural Resources and Wildlife. Bechard was also named the Minister of Canadian Intergovernmental Affairs replacing Jacques P. Dupuis.

Faced with continuing health challenges from his cancer, Béchard announced his retirement from politics on September 7, 2010, and died later the same day.

== Footnotes ==
Political offices
Preceded by Linda Goupil as Minister of Social Solidarity	Minister of Employment and Social Solidarity; 2003–2005	Succeeded by Michelle Courchesne
Preceded by Sylvain Simard as Minister of employment	Minister of Employment and Social Solidarity; 2003–2005	Succeeded by Michelle Courchesne
Preceded by Michel Audet	Minister of Economic Development, Innovation and Trades; 2005–2006	Succeeded by Raymond Bachand
Preceded by Thomas J. Mulcair	Minister of Environment; 2006–2007	Succeeded by Line Beauchamp
Preceded by Pierre Corbeil	Minister of Natural Resources; 2007–2009	Succeeded by Nathalie Normandeau
Preceded by Laurent Lessard	Minister of Agriculture, Fisheries and Food; 2009–2010	Succeeded by Laurent Lessard
Preceded by Jacques P. Dupuis	Minister of Canadian Intergovernmental Affairs; 2009–2010	Succeeded by Nathalie Normandeau
