= Saint-Pierre-de-Lamy =

- Municipality
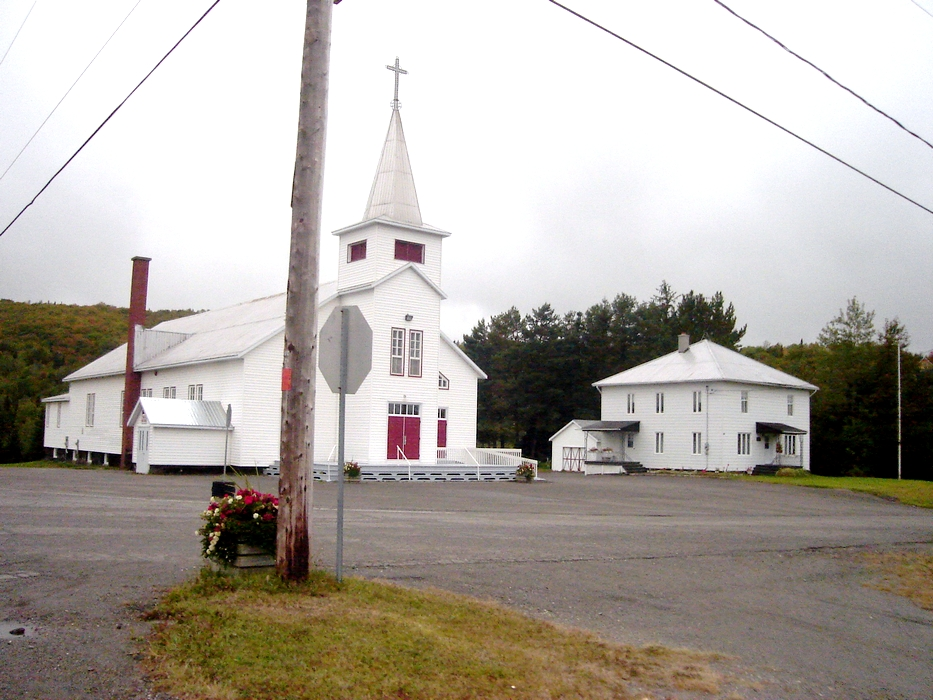
- Church of Saint-Pierre-de-Lamy

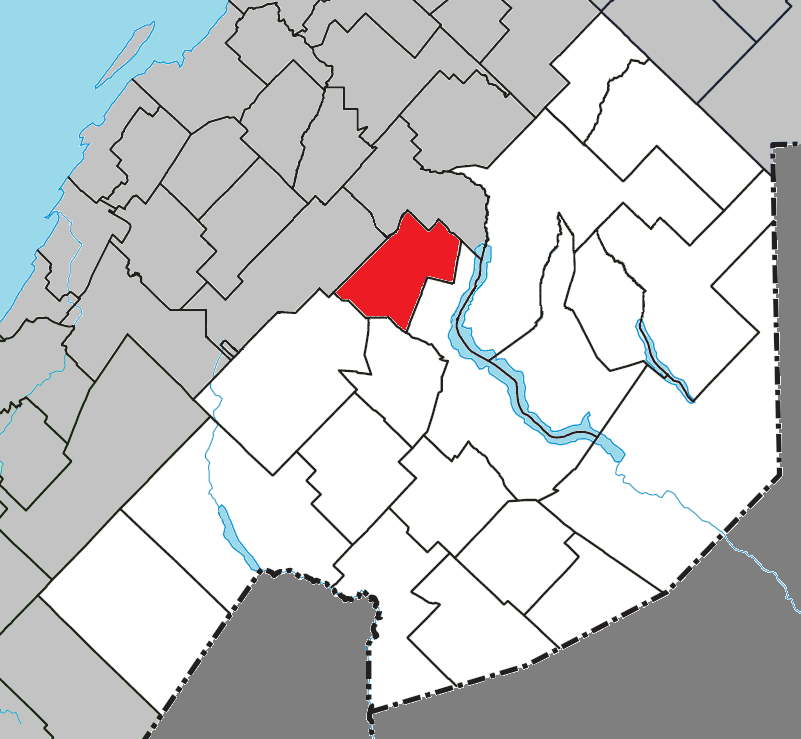
- Location within Témiscouata RCM

- Location in eastern Quebec
- Coordinates: 47°47′N 69°00′W
- Country: Canada
- Province: Quebec
- Region: Bas-Saint-Laurent
- RCM: Témiscouata
- Constituted: June 4, 1977

Government
  - Mayor: Francine Dubé
  - Federal riding: Côte-du-Sud—Rivière-du-Loup—Kataskomiq—Témiscouata
  - Prov. riding: Rivière-du-Loup–Témiscouata–Les Basques

Area
  - Total: 114.10 km^{2} (44.05 sq mi)
  - Land: 110.63 km^{2} (42.71 sq mi)

Population (2021)
  - Total: 122
  - Density: 1.1/km^{2} (2.8/sq mi)
  - Pop 2016-2021: ▲4.3%
  - Dwellings: 100
- Time zone: UTC−5 (EST)
  - Summer (DST): UTC−4 (EDT)
- Postal code(s): G0L 4B0
- Area codes: 418 and 581
- Highways: R-293
- Website: municipalites-du-quebec.com/saint-pierre-de-lamy/

Saint-Pierre-de-Lamy (French pronunciation: [sɛ̃ pjɛʁ də lami]) is a municipality in the Canadian province of Quebec, located in Témiscouata Regional County Municipality. The municipality had a population of 122 in the Canada 2021 Census.

== History ==
This territory was opened to colonisation in 1905, but got off to a very slow start, with real development only taking off in 1936. A religious service was established here in 1949. The parish of Saint-Pierre-de-Lamy, canonically established in 1964, was not recognized as a civil entity until 1977, when the municipality was officially created. Until 1984, when the first municipal council was elected, the municipality was managed by an administrator appointed by the government. Saint-Pierre-de-Lamy is one of the organising localities for the 5th Acadian World Congress in 2014.

== Geography ==
From its source, to the north-east of the village, the Plate River flows north-east. From Lake Sload, in the south of the municipality, the Caldwell River, a tributary of Lake Témiscouata, flows eastwards. The Savane River flows northwards until it joins the Caldwell River. The River Lachaine winds its way along the western boundary, turning south-east several times, before flowing eastwards to its mouth at Lake Sload.

== See also ==
- List of municipalities in Quebec
