= Biencourt, Quebec =

Biencourt
- Municipality
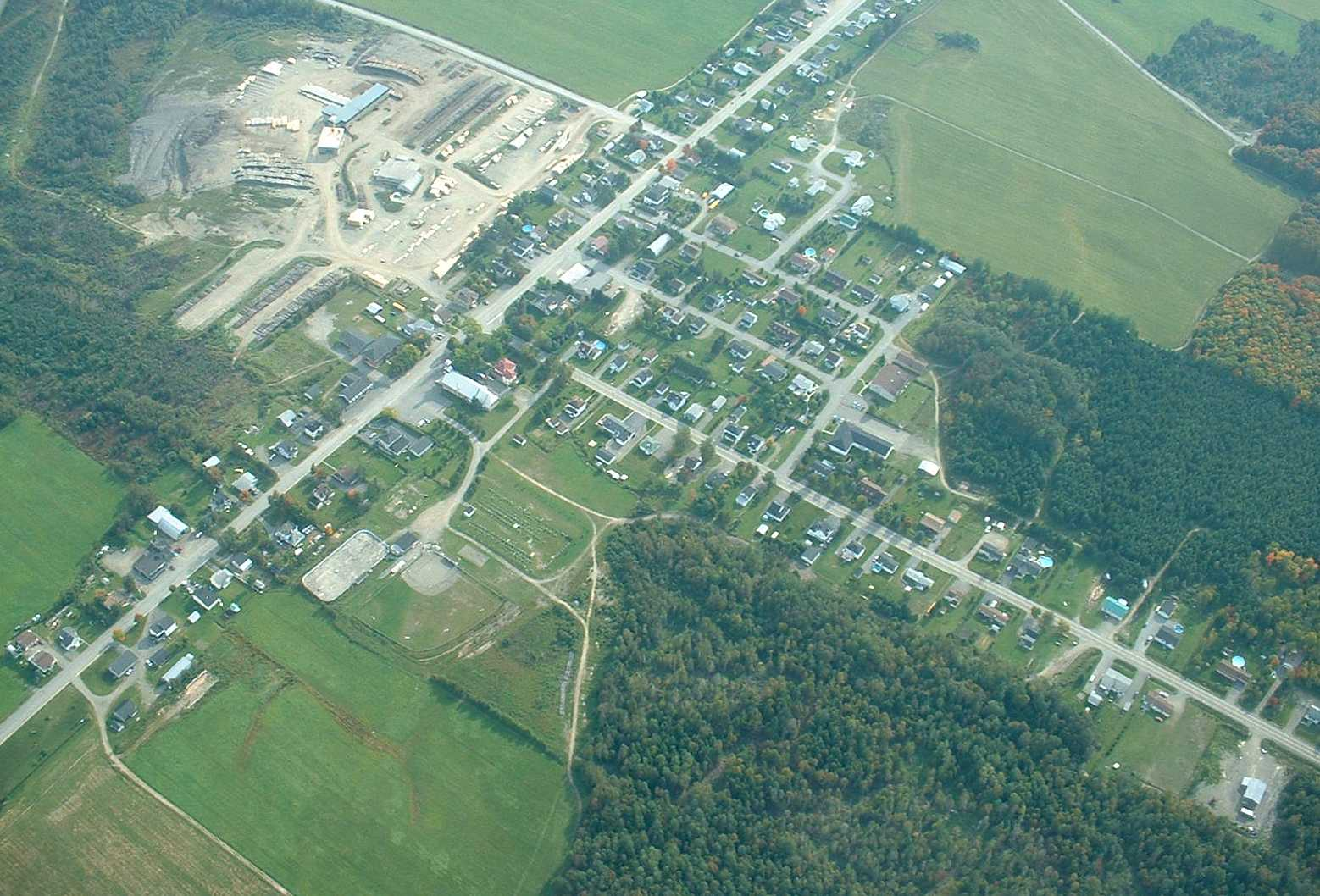

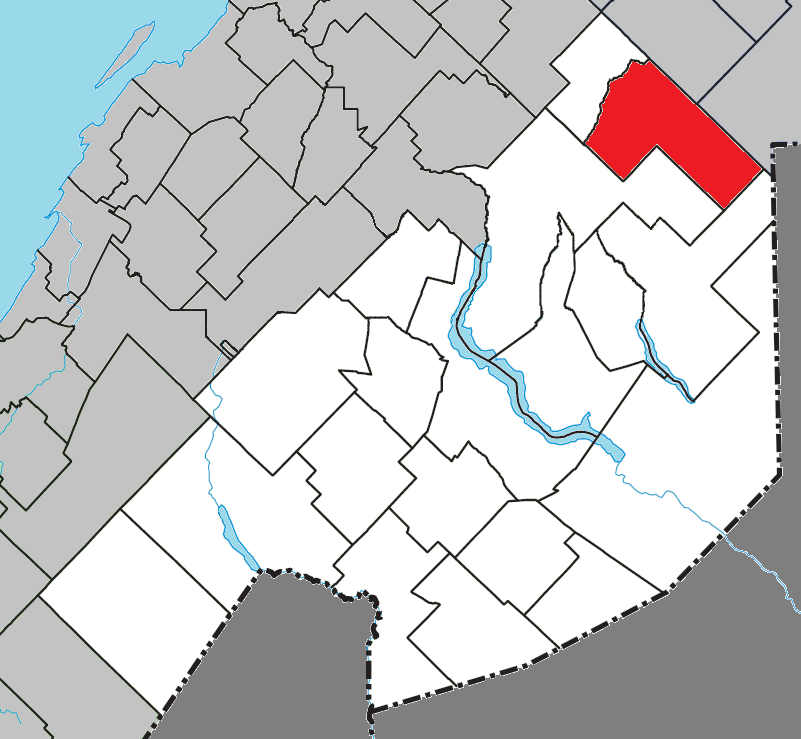
- Location within Témiscouata RCM

- Location in eastern Quebec
- Coordinates: 47°56′N 68°36′W
- Country: Canada
- Province: Quebec
- Region: Bas-Saint-Laurent
- RCM: Témiscouata
- Constituted: January 1, 1947

Government
  - Mayor: Daniel Dumont
  - Federal riding: Côte-du-Sud—Rivière-du-Loup—Kataskomiq—Témiscouata
  - Prov. riding: Rivière-du-Loup–Témiscouata–Les Basques

Area
  - Total: 188.00 km^{2} (72.59 sq mi)
  - Land: 187.12 km^{2} (72.25 sq mi)

Population (2021)
  - Total: 433
  - Density: 2.3/km^{2} (6.0/sq mi)
  - Pop 2016-2021: ▼6.7%
  - Dwellings: 283
- Time zone: UTC−5 (EST)
  - Summer (DST): UTC−4 (EDT)
- Postal code(s): G0K 1T0
- Area codes: 418 and 581
- Highways: R-296
- Website: www.biencourt.ca

Biencourt (French pronunciation: [bjɛ̃kuʁ]) is a municipality in the Canadian province of Quebec, and located in the Témiscouata Regional County Municipality of the Bas-Saint-Laurent region. The municipality had a population of 433 in the Canada 2021 Census.

== Demographics ==
=== Population ===
Historical Census Data - Biencourt, Quebec
Year	Pop.	±%
1951	1,359	—
1956	1,522	+12.0%
1961	1,384	−9.1%
1966	1,254	−9.4%
1971	947	−24.5%
1976	818	−13.6%
1981	824	+0.7%
1986	830	+0.7%
1991	747	−10.0%
1996	675	−9.6%
2001	619	−8.3%
2006	596	−3.7%
2011	506	−15.1%
2016	464	−8.3%
2021	433	−6.7%

=== Language ===
Mother tongue (2021)

Language	Population	Pct (%)
French only	430	100.0%
English only	0	0.0%
English and French	5	1.2%
Non-official languages	0	0.0%

== See also ==
- List of municipalities in Quebec
- Touladi River
