= Packington, Quebec =

Packington
- Parish municipality
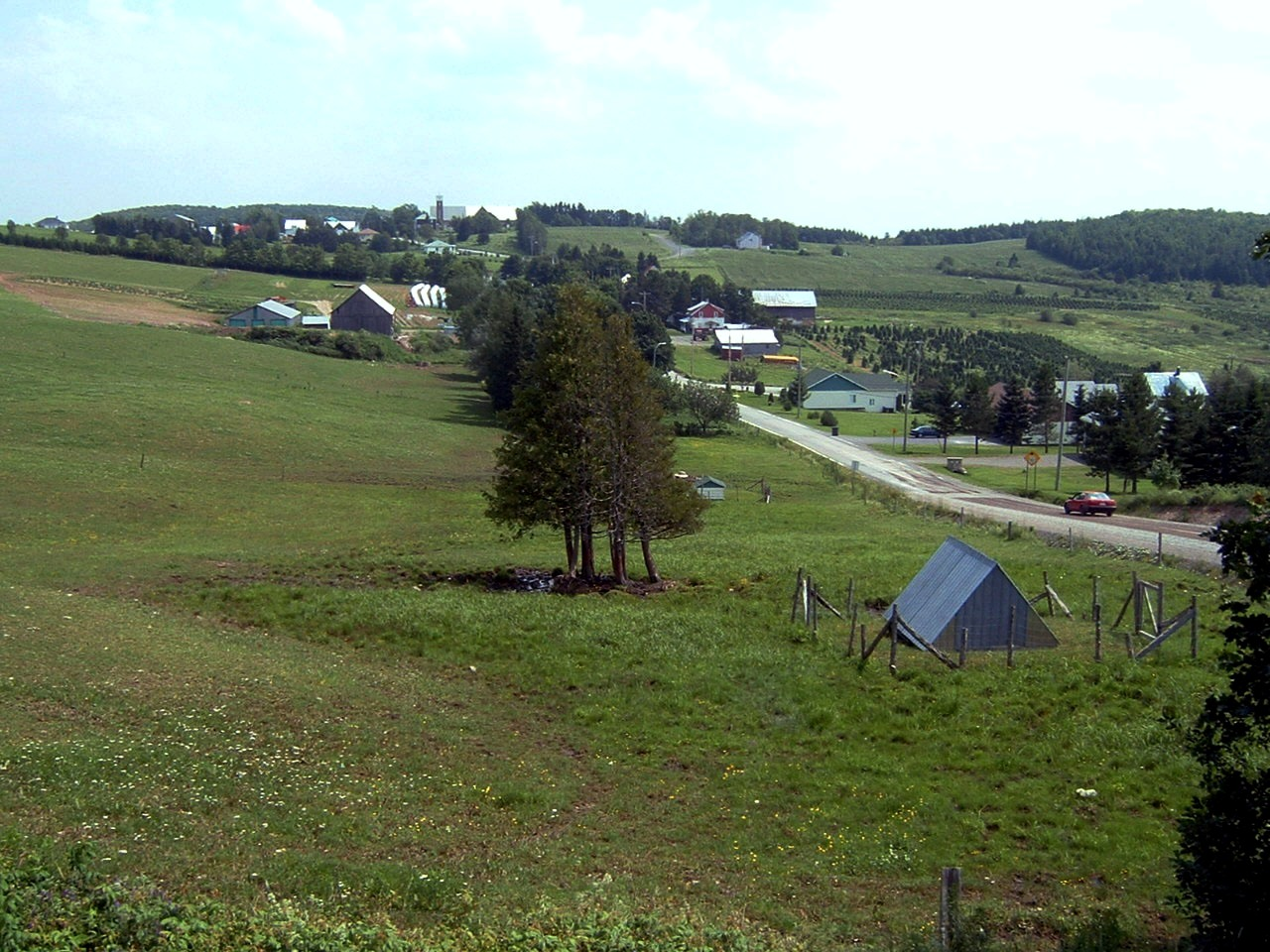
- Village of Packington

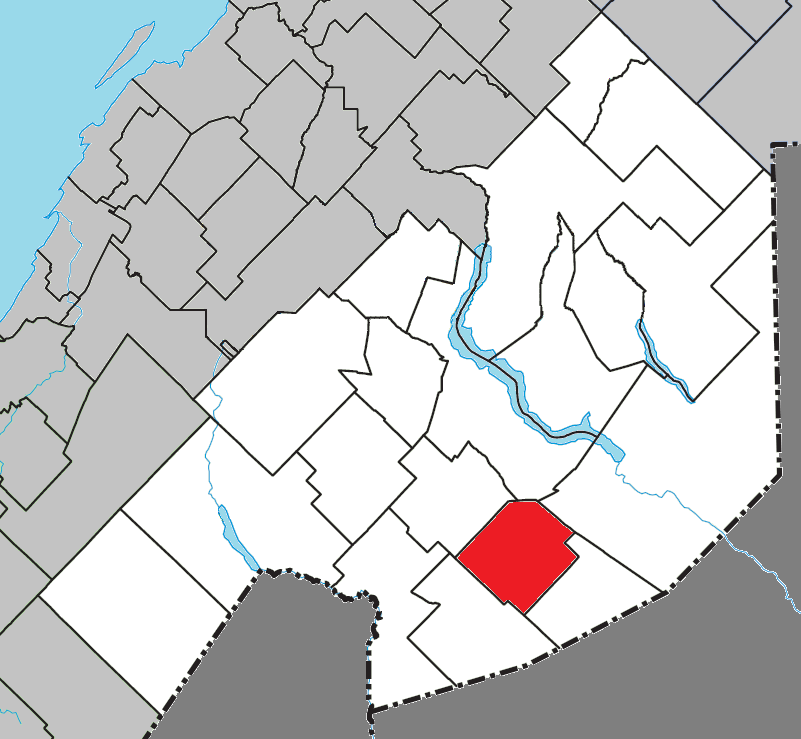
- Location within Témiscouata RCM

- Location in eastern Quebec
- Coordinates: 47°29′N 68°47′W
- Country: Canada
- Province: Quebec
- Region: Bas-Saint-Laurent
- RCM: Témiscouata
- Constituted: October 6, 1925
- Named for: John Pakington, 1st Baron Hampton

Government
  - Mayor: Jules Soucy
  - Federal riding: Côte-du-Sud—Rivière-du-Loup—Kataskomiq—Témiscouata
  - Prov. riding: Rivière-du-Loup–Témiscouata–Les Basques

Area
  - Total: 123.30 km^{2} (47.61 sq mi)
  - Land: 118.75 km^{2} (45.85 sq mi)

Population (2021)
  - Total: 578
  - Density: 4.9/km^{2} (13/sq mi)
  - Pop 2016-2021: ▼4.1%
  - Dwellings: 419
- Time zone: UTC−5 (EST)
  - Summer (DST): UTC−4 (EDT)
- Postal code(s): G0L 1Z0
- Area codes: 418 and 581
- Highways: No major routes
- Website: www.packington.org

Packington is a parish municipality in the Canadian province of Quebec, located in the Témiscouata Regional County Municipality in the Bas-Saint-Laurent region.

== History ==
The first attempts at colonisation in Packington and Robinson townships, which today form the parish of Saint-Benoît de Packington, date back 133 years. By the end of the 19th century, eyes were turning to these ‘Crown’ lands, coveted not only for their natural riches, but above all so that heads of family could settle their children to live there. In 1876, Benoît Valcourt, who lived with his sons on land at Notre-Dame-du-Lac, visited the area and found it so suitable for farming that he decided to come and settle with them around 1878. In their first year, the Valcourts cleared the land considerably and built a six-mile road linking them to Sainte-Rose-du-Dégelé.

In the early days, a large number of farmers from the old parishes came to see the new land; I'm told that at least a hundred came, and it looked as though Packington Township would be settled quickly, but unfortunately the poor state of the road that had to be travelled before reaching the good land discouraged most of them, who returned disillusioned.

The Municipality was officially founded in 1925 under the name Saint-Benoît-Abbé. In 1972, the name was changed to Packington, a name that was originally used to name this territory.

Pakington was one of the organizing communities of the 5th Acadian World Congress in 2014.

== Demographics ==
In the 2021 Census of Population conducted by Statistics Canada, Packington had a population of 578 living in 273 of its 419 total private dwellings, a change of −4.1% from its 2016 population of 603. With a land area of 118.75 km^{2} (45.85 sq mi), it had a population density of 4.9/km^{2} (12.6/sq mi) in 2021.

== See also ==
- Temiscouata Regional County Municipality
- Branche à Jerry, a stream
- Baker River North (Quebec-New Brunswick), au stream
- List of parish municipalities in Quebec
