= Auclair, Quebec =

Auclair
- Municipality
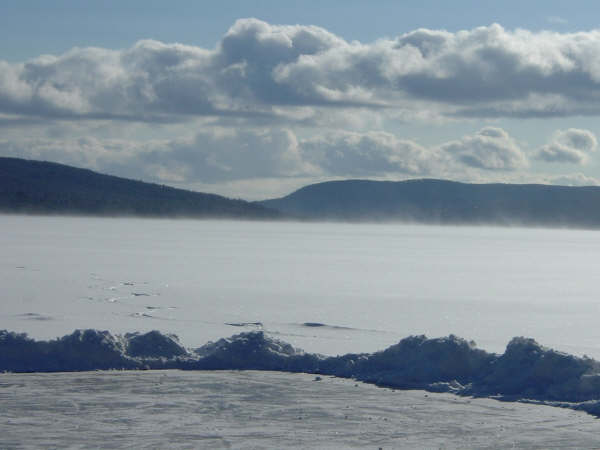
- View of Lake Squatec in Auclair

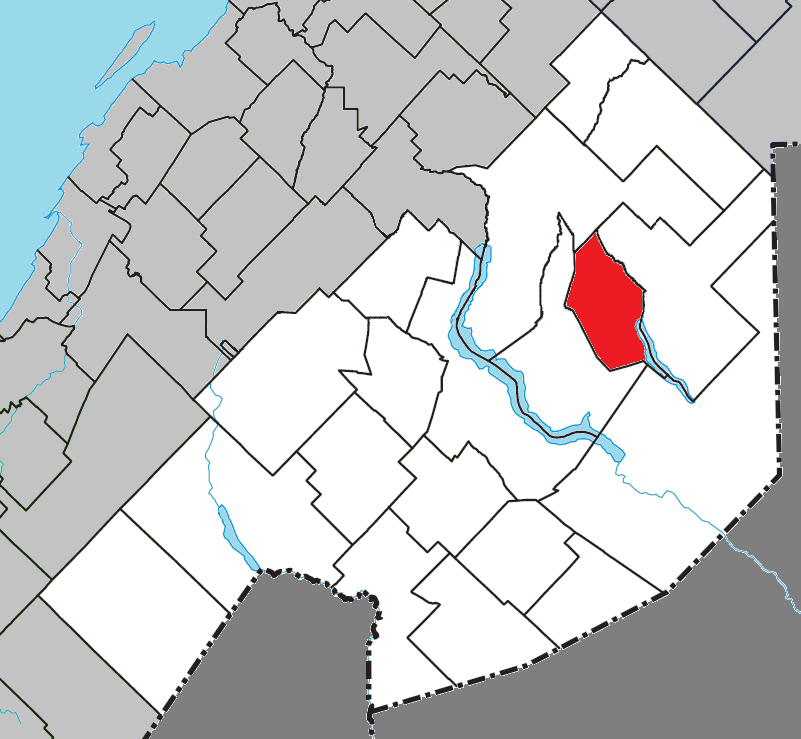
- Location within Témiscouata RCM

- Location in eastern Quebec
- Coordinates: 47.7333°N 68.65°W
- Country: Canada
- Province: Quebec
- Region: Bas-Saint-Laurent
- RCM: Témiscouata
- Constituted: January 1, 1954

Government
  - Mayor: Éric Soucy
  - Federal riding: Côte-du-Sud—Rivière-du-Loup—Kataskomiq—Témiscouata
  - Prov. riding: Rivière-du-Loup–Témiscouata–Les Basques

Area
  - Total: 107.70 km^{2} (41.58 sq mi)
  - Land: 105.78 km^{2} (40.84 sq mi)

Population (2021)
  - Total: 447
  - Density: 4.2/km^{2} (11/sq mi)
  - Pop 2016-2021: ▼0.2%
  - Dwellings: 264
- Time zone: UTC−5 (EST)
  - Summer (DST): UTC−4 (EDT)
- Postal code(s): G0L 1A0
- Area codes: 418 and 581
- Highways: R-295
- Website: www.municipaliteauclair.ca

Auclair (French pronunciation: [oklɛʁ]) is a municipality in the Canadian province of Quebec, located in the Témiscouata Regional County Municipality. The municipality had a population of 447 as of the Canada 2021 Census.

== History ==
On 28 April 1917, the canton of Auclair was proclaimed.

In 1931, the Saint-Émile mission was founded. Parish registers were opened on 13 January 1932. That same year, the first chapel was built. On 6 June 1941, the parish of Saint-Émile d'Auclair was canonically erected. The first parish priest was Camille Lachance in 1944. In 1954, the municipality of Auclair was officially founded.

In 2014, Auclair is one of the host communities for the Fifth Acadian World Congress.

== Demographics ==
In the 2021 Census of Population conducted by Statistics Canada, Auclair had a population of 447 living in 212 of its 264 total private dwellings, a change of −0.2% from its 2016 population of 448. With a land area of 105.78 km^{2} (40.84 sq mi), it had a population density of 4.2/km^{2} (10.9/sq mi) in 2021.

Canada census – Auclair, Quebec community profile

	2021	2016	2011
Population	447 (-0.2% from 2016)	448 (0.9% from 2011)	444 (-12.9% from 2006)
Land area	105.78 km^{2} (40.84 sq mi)	105.44 km^{2} (40.71 sq mi)	105.26 km^{2} (40.64 sq mi)
Population density	4.2/km^{2} (11/sq mi)	4.2/km^{2} (11/sq mi)	4.2/km^{2} (11/sq mi)
Median age	52.0 (M: 50.4, F: 52.8)	49.6 (M: 47.0, F: 50.5)	44.8 (M: 43.5, F: 46.3)
Private dwellings	264 (total) 212 (occupied)	265 (total) 202 (occupied)	223 (total) 192 (occupied)
Median household income	$54,800	$46,464	$43,997

References: 2021 2016 2011

Historical census populations – Auclair, Quebec

Year	Pop.	±%
1956	956	—
1961	904	−5.4%
1966	788	−12.8%
1971	655	−16.9%
1976	596	−9.0%
1981	598	+0.3%
1986	549	−8.2%

Year	Pop.	±%
1991	531	−3.3%
1996	546	+2.8%
2001	520	−4.8%
2006	510	−1.9%
2011	444	−12.9%
2016	448	+0.9%
2021	447	−0.2%

Population figures based on revised counts.
Source: Statistics Canada

== See also ==
- List of municipalities in Quebec
