= Léonard Lévesque =

Canadian politician

Member of the National Assembly of Quebec
- In office 1976–1985
- Preceded by: Jean-Marie Pelletier
- Succeeded by: France Dionne
- Constituency: Kamouraska-Témiscouata

Personal details
- Born: May 23, 1935 Notre-Dame-du-Mont-Carmel, Quebec, Canada
- Died: August 26, 2017 (aged 82) La Pocatière, Quebec, Canada
- Party: Parti Québécois

Léonard Lévesque (May 23, 1935 – August 26, 2017) was a Canadian politician. Born in Notre-dame-du-Mont-Carmel, Quebec, Lévesque represented the electoral district of Kamouraska-Témiscouata in the National Assembly of Quebec from 1976 to 1985. He was a member of the Parti Québécois.

== Biography ==
Lévesque died on August 26, 2017, in La Pocatière, Quebec. He was aged 82 years and 3 months.

Lévesque studied at a trade school in Montreal and worked briefly in electronic before returning to work on the family farm. He was Vice President of the Caisse populaire of Notre-Dame-du-Mont-Carmel.

Lévesque maintained a low presence after his life in politics.
