= Jean-Marie Pelletier =

Canadian politician

Member of the National Assembly of Quebec
- In office 1970–1973
- Preceded by: Adélard D'Anjou
- Succeeded by: riding dissolved
- Constituency: Kamouraska
- In office 1973–1976
- Preceded by: first member
- Succeeded by: Léonard Lévesque
- Constituency: Kamouraska-Témiscouata

Personal details
- Born: June 26, 1933 (age 92) Sainte-Anne-de-la-Pocatière, Quebec, Canada
- Party: Quebec Liberal Party
- Occupation: Politician

Jean-Marie Pelletier (born June 26, 1933) is a former Canadian politician, who represented the electoral district of Kamouraska from 1970 to 1973, and Kamouraska-Témiscouata from 1973 to 1976, in the National Assembly of Quebec. He was a member of the Quebec Liberal Party. Pelletier was born in Sainte-Anne-de-la-Pocatière, Quebec.
