= Brisson River (rivière du Grand Touradi tributary) =

Location
- Country: Canada
- Province: Quebec
- Region: Bas-Saint-Laurent
- MRC: Rimouski-Neigette Regional County Municipality

Physical characteristics
- Source: Mountain stream
  - location: Réserve faunique Duchénier
  - coordinates: 48°08′34″N 68°34′53″W
  - elevation: 295 m (968 ft)
- Mouth: Rivière du Grand Touradi
  - location: Saint-Esprit
  - coordinates: 48°06′18″N 68°34′01″W
  - elevation: 183 m (600 ft)
- Length: 6.5 km (4.0 mi)

Basin features
- Tributaries
  - left: Discharge of Hélène Lake.

The Brisson River (French: Rivière Brisson) flows in the Réserve faunique Duchénier and in the municipality of Esprit-Saint, in the Rimouski-Neigette Regional County Municipality, in the administrative region of Bas-Saint-Laurent, in the province of Quebec, in Canada.

This river flows on the north bank of the Grand Touradi River which flows northeast to the south bank of the Rimouski River; the latter flows west, then north, to the south shore of the St. Lawrence River where it pours into the heart of the city of Rimouski.

== Geography ==
The Brisso river "rises at the mouth of Chasseur lake (length: 1.4 km (0.87 mi); altitude: 295 m (968 ft)), in the Duchénier Wildlife Reserve, in the Notre Dame Mountains. This lake is fed by the outlet of Lac Ovale (altitude: 304 m (997 ft)) and is located in the heart of the Duchénier Wildlife Reserve.

The mouth of Lac Chasseur is located 27.1 km (16.8 mi) southeast of the southeast coast of the St. Lawrence River, 2.0 km (1.2 mi) northeast west of the limit of the municipality of Esprit-Saint, at 5.2 km (3.2 mi) to the east of "Grand Lac Touradi", and at 8.3 km (5.2 mi) to the South from the center of the village of Esprit-Saint.

From Lac Chasseur, the Brisson river flows over 6.5 km (4.0 mi), divided into the following segments:

- 1.8 km (1.1 mi) south, in the Duchénier Wildlife Reserve, to a stream (coming from the west);
- 0.8 km (0.50 mi) southwards, to a stream (coming from the south-west);
- 1.4 km (0.87 mi) southwards, to the limit of the municipality of Esprit-Saint;
- 0.4 km (0.25 mi) south-east, to the outlet of Lac Hélène (coming from the north);
- 2.1 km (1.3 mi) towards the south-east, forming a curve towards the west, up to the confluence of the river.

The Brisson river flows on the north bank of the Grand Touradi River which constitutes the southern limit of the Duchénier Wildlife Reserve. This confluence is located 33.8 km (21.0 mi) southeast of the southeast coast of the St. Lawrence River, 3.9 km (2.4 mi) north of the village center of Esprit-Saint, 7.4 km (4.6 mi) west of the village center of La Trinité-des-Monts.

== Toponymy ==
The toponym "Rivière Brisson" was formalized on June 11, 1982, at the Commission de toponymie du Québec.

== See also ==
- List of rivers of Quebec
