= Saint-Elzéar-de-Témiscouata =

- Municipality

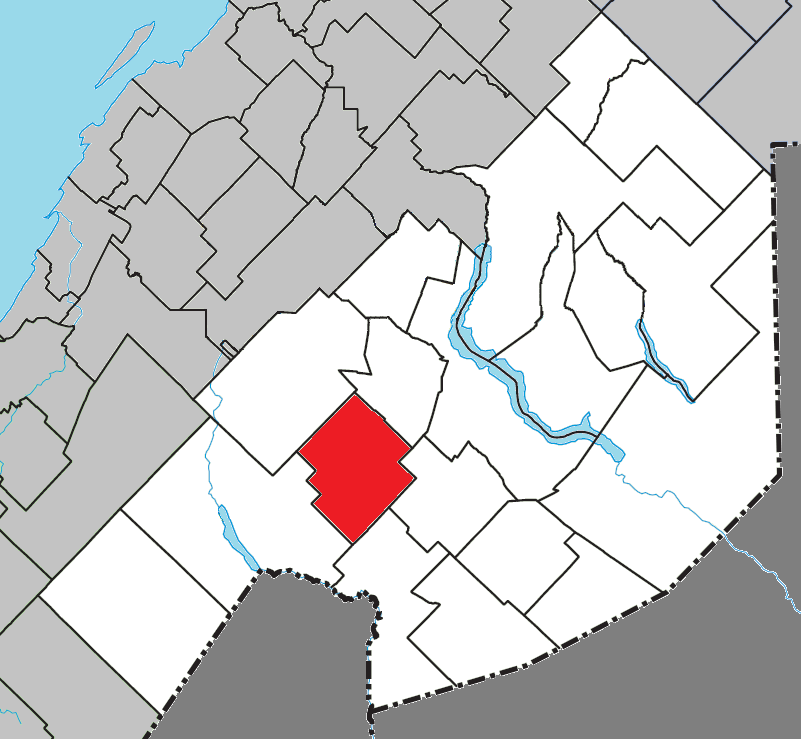
- Location within Témiscouata RCM

- Location in eastern Quebec
- Coordinates: 47°35′N 69°06′W
- Country: Canada
- Province: Quebec
- Region: Bas-Saint-Laurent
- RCM: Témiscouata
- Constituted: November 19, 1938

Government
  - Mayor: Réjean Deschênes
  - Federal riding: Côte-du-Sud—Rivière-du-Loup—Kataskomiq—Témiscouata
  - Prov. riding: Rivière-du-Loup–Témiscouata–Les Basques

Area
  - Total: 150.70 km^{2} (58.19 sq mi)
  - Land: 151.14 km^{2} (58.36 sq mi)

Population (2021)
  - Total: 311
  - Density: 2.1/km^{2} (5.4/sq mi)
  - Pop 2016-2021: ▼3.1%
  - Dwellings: 154
- Time zone: UTC−5 (EST)
  - Summer (DST): UTC−4 (EDT)
- Postal code(s): G0L 2W0
- Area codes: 418 and 581
- Highways: No major routes
- Website: www.saintelzear.ca

Saint-Elzéar-de-Témiscouata (French pronunciation: [sɛ̃t‿ɛlzeaʁ də temiskwata]) is a municipality in the Témiscouata Regional County Municipality in the Bas-Saint-Laurent region of Quebec, Canada.

Prior to January 19, 2002, it was known simply as Saint-Elzéar.

== See also ==
- List of municipalities in Quebec
