= Esprit-Saint =

- Municipality
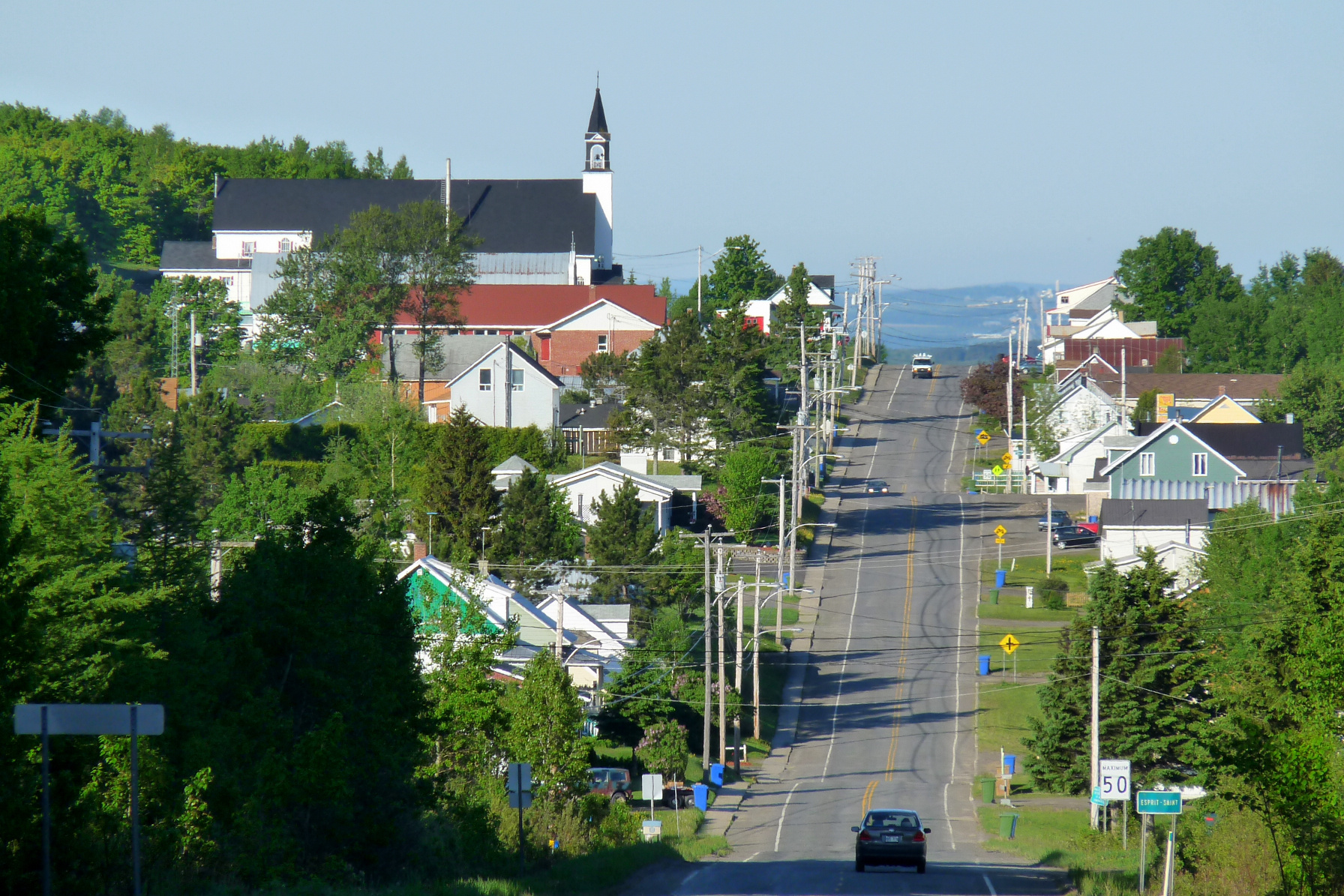

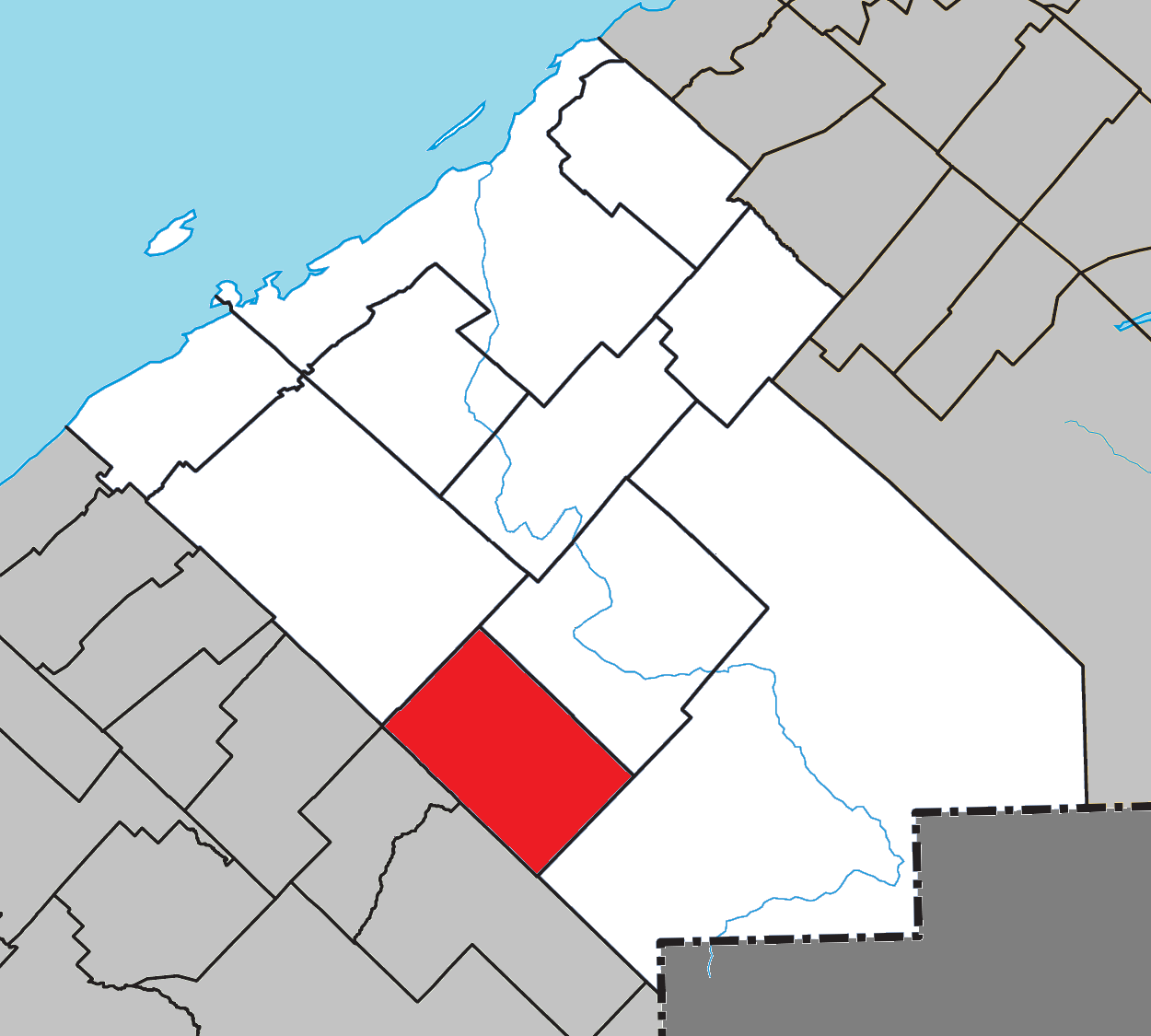
- Location within Rimouski-Neigette RCM

- Location in eastern Quebec
- Coordinates: 48.0667°N 68.5667°W
- Country: Canada
- Province: Quebec
- Region: Bas-Saint-Laurent
- RCM: Rimouski-Neigette
- Constituted: May 13, 1972
- Named for: The Holy Spirit the third person of the Trinity

Government
  - Mayor: Ginette Bilodeau
  - Federal riding: Rimouski-Neigette—Mitis—Matapédia—Les Basques
  - Prov. riding: Rimouski

Area
  - Total: 169.40 km^{2} (65.41 sq mi)
  - Land: 168.96 km^{2} (65.24 sq mi)

Population (2021)
  - Total: 340
  - Density: 2/km^{2} (5.2/sq mi)
  - Pop 2016-2021: ▼0.3%
  - Dwellings: 198
- Time zone: UTC−5 (EST)
  - Summer (DST): UTC−4 (EDT)
- Postal code(s): G0K 1A0
- Area codes: 418 and 581
- Highways: R-232
- Website: www.municipalite.esprit-saint.qc.ca

Esprit-Saint (French pronunciation: [ɛspʁi sɛ̃]) is a municipality in Rimouski-Neigette Regional County Municipality in the Bas-Saint-Laurent region of Quebec, Canada. Its population as of the Canada 2021 Census was 340.

The name Esprit-Saint is in honor of the Holy Spirit who is the third person in the Trinity.

== History ==
Esprit-Saint was founded in 1972.

== Demographics ==
In the 2021 Census of Population conducted by Statistics Canada, Esprit-Saint had a population of 340 living in 173 of its 198 total private dwellings, a change of −0.3% from its 2016 population of 341. With a land area of 168.96 km^{2} (65.24 sq mi), it had a population density of 2.0/km^{2} (5.2/sq mi) in 2021.

== See also ==
- Touladi River
- List of municipalities in Quebec
