= André Simard (politician) =

Canadian politician

Mayor of Saint-Roch-des-Aulnaies
- In office 5 November 2017 – 2 November 2025
- Preceded by: Michel Castonguay
- Succeeded by: Roxane Martine Coutu

MNA for Kamouraska-Témiscouata
- In office 29 November 2010 – 4 September 2012
- Preceded by: Claude Béchard
- Succeeded by: riding dissolved

Personal details
- Born: 22 November 1953 (age 72) Normandin, Quebec
- Party: Parti Québécois
- Spouse: Marlène Collard

André Simard (born 22 November 1953) is a Canadian politician, who was elected to the National Assembly of Quebec in a by-election on 29 November 2010, representing the electoral district of Kamouraska-Témiscouata.

He ran unsuccessfully in the redrawn riding of Côte-du-Sud in the 2012 and 2014 elections.
