= Saint-Eusèbe, Quebec =

Saint-Eusèbe
- Parish municipality
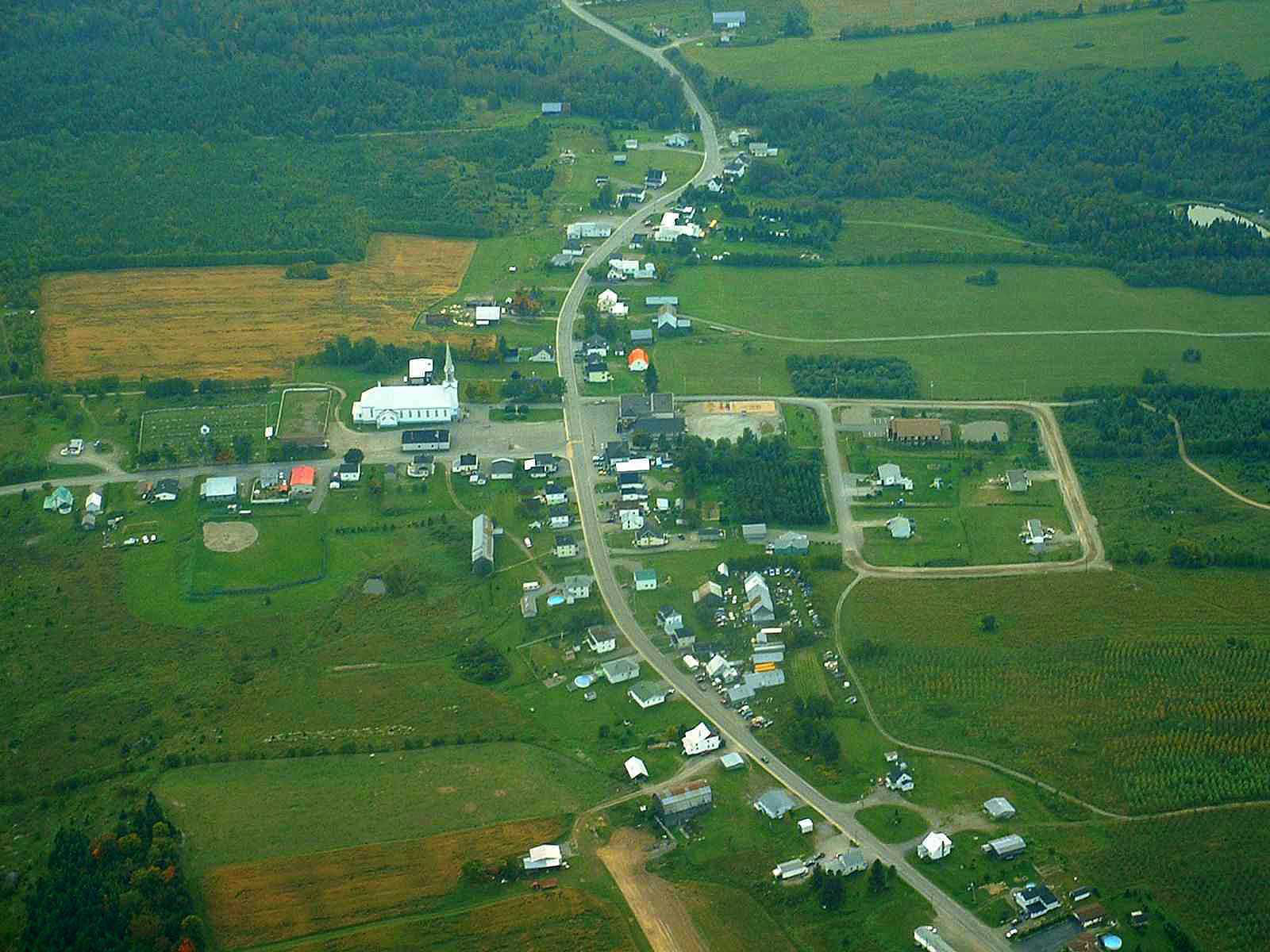
- Aerial view of Saint-Eusèbe

- Coat of arms

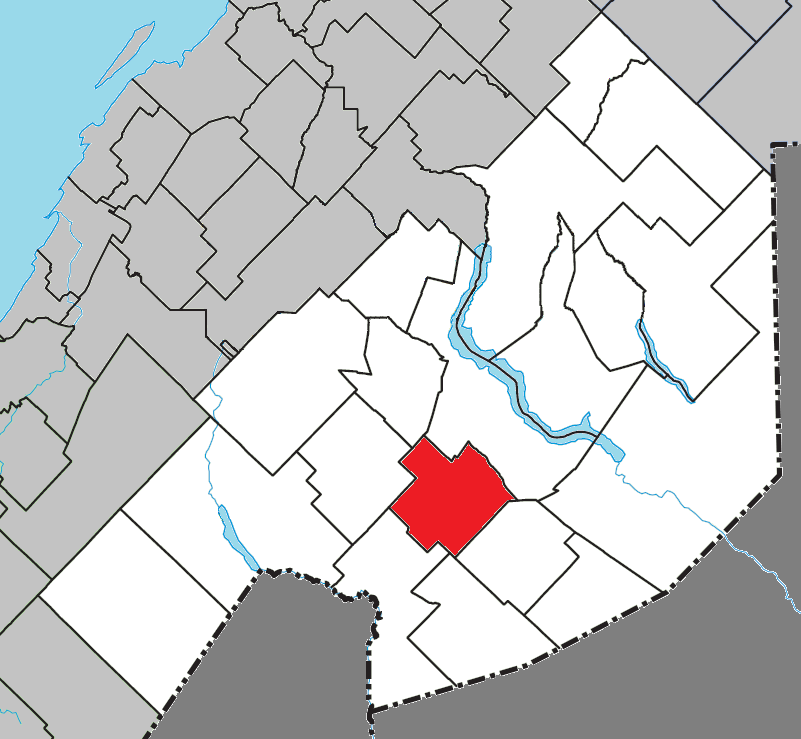
- Location within Témiscouata RCM

- Location in eastern Quebec
- Coordinates: 47°33′N 68°55′W
- Country: Canada
- Province: Quebec
- Region: Bas-Saint-Laurent
- RCM: Témiscouata
- Constituted: January 5, 1911
- Named for: Eusèbe Sénéchal

Government
  - Mayor: Gilles Pellerin
  - Federal riding: Côte-du-Sud—Rivière-du-Loup—Kataskomiq—Témiscouata
  - Prov. riding: Rivière-du-Loup–Témiscouata–Les Basques

Area
  - Total: 131.00 km^{2} (50.58 sq mi)
  - Land: 129.56 km^{2} (50.02 sq mi)

Population (2021)
  - Total: 587
  - Density: 4.5/km^{2} (12/sq mi)
  - Pop 2016-2021: ▼1%
  - Dwellings: 276
- Time zone: UTC−5 (EST)
  - Summer (DST): UTC−4 (EDT)
- Postal code(s): G0L 2Y0
- Area codes: 418 and 581
- Highways: R-232

Saint-Eusèbe (French pronunciation: [sɛ̃t‿øzɛb]) is a parish municipality in Quebec, Canada. It was established in 1911.

== Demographics ==
In the 2021 Census of Population conducted by Statistics Canada, Saint-Eusèbe had a population of 587 living in 244 of its 276 total private dwellings, a change of −1% from its 2016 population of 593. With a land area of 129.56 km^{2} (50.02 sq mi), it had a population density of 4.5/km^{2} (11.7/sq mi) in 2021.

== See also ==
- Branche à Jerry, a stream
- List of parish municipalities in Quebec
