= Touladi River =

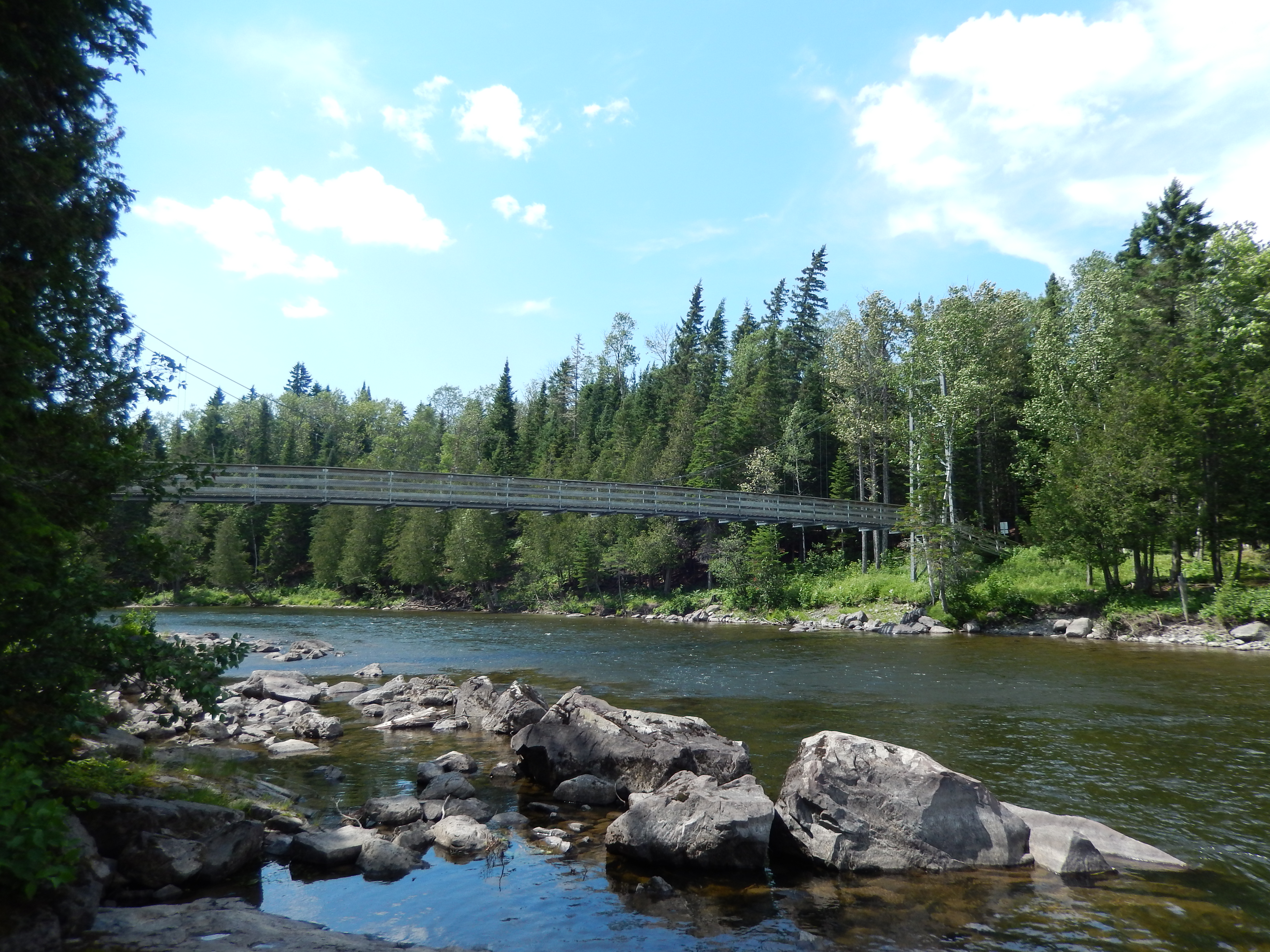

Location
- Country: Canada
- Province: Quebec
- Administrative region: Bas-Saint-Laurent

Physical characteristics
- Source
  - location: Vanlandel Pond in Notre Dame Mountains, Bas-Saint-Laurent, Quebec
  - coordinates: 47°56′48″N 68°17′27″W
  - elevation: 403 m (1,322 ft)
- Mouth
  - location: Lake Témiscouata, in Bas-Saint-Laurent, Quebec
  - coordinates: 47°40′19″N 68°48′00″W
  - elevation: 141 m (463 ft)
- Length: 75.9 km (47.2 mi)
- Basin size: 1,502 km^{2} (580 sq mi)

Basin features
- Tributaries
  - left: (from the mouth) Mac’s brook, Cold Water brook, Pierre brook, Sutherland brook, Castor brook, Thomas brook, Talbot stream, Squatec River, Pelletier stream, Thériault Branch, Cinquième rang stream, Cailloux brook, Sisime brook, Trestle brook, Castor brook, Dianne brook.
  - right: (from the mouth) Eagles River (Touladi River), Castor brook, rivière de l'Orient, Raymond brook, McLean brook, discharge of « Lac de l'Écurie », discharge of « Lac de la Cache ».

The Touladi River flows in the administrative region of Bas-Saint-Laurent, south of the Gaspé Peninsula, in Quebec, Canada. This river runs through the regional county municipality (RCM) of:

- Rimouski-Neigette Regional County Municipality: Rimouski Wildlife Reserve;
- Témiscouata Regional County Municipality: municipalities of Biencourt, Esprit-Saint, Saint-Michel-du-Squatec and Sainte-Juste-du-Lac.

The upper course of the river is in the Rimouski Wildlife Reserve, while the lower part (including the Little Touladi Lake and Touladi Lake that are located in the township of Robitaille) is administered by the Lake-Témiscouata National Park, which is the former territory of the Madawaska lordship. In the end of course, the Touladi River flows on the eastern shore of Lake Temiscouata, in the municipality of Saint-Juste-du-Lac or at the southern limit of Lake-Témiscouata National Park.

The river side of the Touladi River is accessible by route 232 East.

== Geography ==
The Touladi River originates from Valandel pond which is surrounded by a marsh area with a diameter of 0.9 kilometres (0.56 mi). The source of the river is located in the southwest part of the Rimouski Wildlife Reserve, in Notre Dame Mountains or in the vacant lands of the Rimouski county southeast of the cantons Laroche and Biencourt.

The source of the Touladi River is located at:

- 1.0 kilometre (0.62 mi) northwest of the headwaters of the Rimouski River;
- 3.4 kilometres (2.1 mi) north of the border between Quebec and New Brunswick;
- 60.9 kilometres (37.8 mi) south of the bridge of route 132 crossing the Rimouski River in the city center of Rimouski;
- 50.3 kilometres (31.3 mi) northeast of the confluence of Touladi River.

The Touladi River flows on 75.9 kilometres (47.2 mi) divided into the following segments:

Higher Touladi River courses (in the Rimouski Wildlife Reserve) (segment of 21.5 kilometres (13.4 mi))

- 3.0 kilometres (1.9 mi) to the northwest in the forest zone in the Rimouski Wildlife Reserve up to the forest road bridge;
- 9.2 kilometres (5.7 mi) to the northwest, up to a stream (from the northeast);
- 4.2 kilometres (2.6 mi) to the southwest up to a forest road bridge;
- 1.0 kilometre (0.62 mi) to the southwest, up to Dianne stream (from the southwest);
- 3.0 kilometres (1.9 mi) to the northwest, up to the forest road bridge;
- 1.1 kilometres (0.68 mi) westward up to the boundary of the Témiscouata Regional County Municipality, where the river leaves the Rimouski Wildlife Reserve.

Intermediate Course of the Touladi River (upstream of the East River) (segment of 12.3 kilometres (7.6 mi))

- 2.1 kilometres (1.3 mi) to the northwest by making a foray into the Témiscouata Regional County Municipality (RCM), up to the limit of the Rimouski Wildlife Reserve;
- 1.3 kilometres (0.81 mi) to the northwest by making a foray into the Rimouski-Neigette Regional County Municipality (RCM) up to the limit of the Témiscouata Regional County Municipality (RCM);
- 2.3 kilometres (1.4 mi) to the Northwest snaking up to the limit of the municipality of Biencourt;
- 2.3 kilometres (1.4 mi) to the Northwest meandering in the municipality of Biencourt, up to the southwest shore of Lake Biencourt;
- 2.1 kilometres (1.3 mi) to the northwest across Lake Biencourt on its full length up to the mouth of the lake;
- 1.6 kilometres (0.99 mi) to the Northwest in marsh area up to the boundary of the municipality Esprit-Saint;
- 0.6 kilometres (0.37 mi) to the Northwest in area of marshland in Esprit-Saint, to the confluence of the East River.

Intermediate course of the Touladi River (downstream of the East River (Touladi River)) (segment of 25.3 kilometres (15.7 mi))

- 2.0 kilometres (1.2 mi) to the Northwest area of marshland in Esprit-Saint, up to the boundary of the municipality of Biencourt;
- 9.3 kilometres (5.8 mi) to the west, then southwest, forming the boundary between the municipalities of Biencourt and Lac-des-Aigles, up to the highway bridge;
- 6.7 kilometres (4.2 mi) to the Southwest, in parallel (Southwest side) of Eagles Lake, up to the boundary of the municipality of Saint-Michel-du-Squatec;
- 6.3 kilometres (3.9 mi) to the southwest, flowing more or less in parallel to the Eagles River (Touladi River), up to the confluence of the Eagles River (Touladi River) (coming from the north);
- 1.0 kilometre (0.62 mi) to the south, forming a curve to the west where it bypasses the village of Saint-Michel-du-Squatec, up to the confluence of the River Squatec.

Lower course of the Touladi River (downstream of the Squatec River) (segment of 26.0 kilometres (16.2 mi))

- 5.5 kilometres (3.4 mi) southward meandering up to the boundary of the municipality of Saint-Juste-du-Lac;
- 4.9 kilometres (3.0 mi) to the south entering the "Lac-Témiscouata National Park", up to the north shore of “Little Touladi Lake”;
- 4.6 kilometres (2.9 mi) to the southwest, crossing the “Little Touladi Lake” (length: 4.6 kilometres (2.9 mi); height: 159 metres (522 ft)) on its full length up to its confluence;
- 4.6 kilometres (2.9 mi) to the south, crossing the Lake Touladi (length: 5.8 kilometres (3.6 mi); height: 159 metres (522 ft)) up to its mouth located on the west shore of the lake;
- 6.4 kilometres (4.0 mi) to the southwest, up to the confluence of the river.

The Touladi River empties on the east shore of Lake Temiscouata, in the municipality of Saint-Juste-du-Lac, Quebec. This confluence is located:

- 3.9 kilometres (2.4 mi) northwest of downtown Saint-Juste-du-Lac;
- 6.5 kilometres (4.0 mi) north of downtown Notre-Dame-du-Lac;
- 5.7 kilometres (3.5 mi) east of downtown Cabano;
- 17.1 kilometres (10.6 mi) northwest of downtown Dégelis.

== Toponymy ==
The place name "Touladi River" was formalized on December 5, 1968, at the Commission de toponymie du Québec (Geographical Quebec Names Board).
