= Saint-Juste-du-Lac =

- Municipality
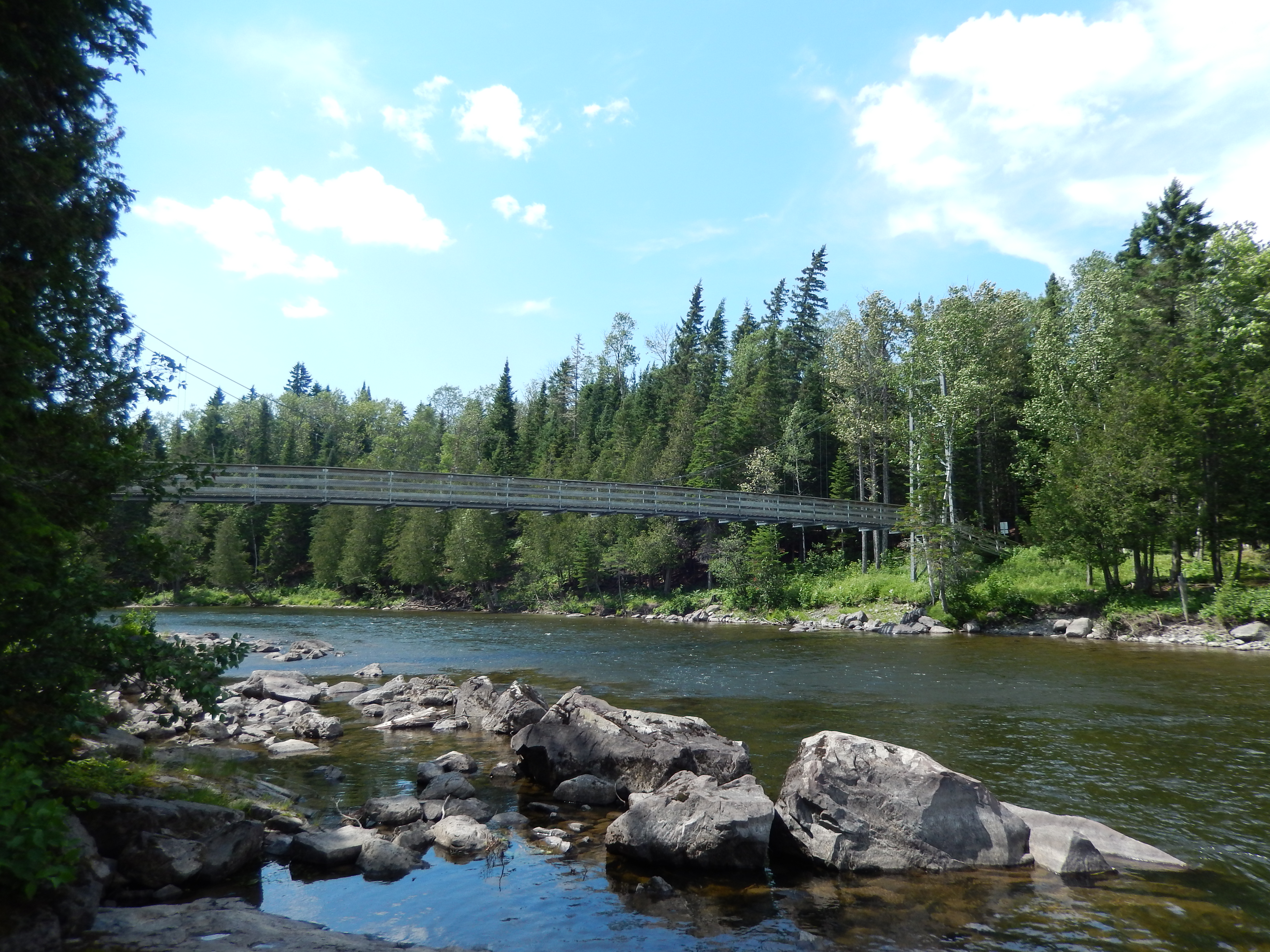

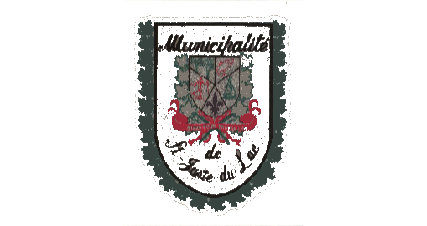
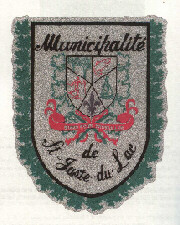
- Flag Coat of arms

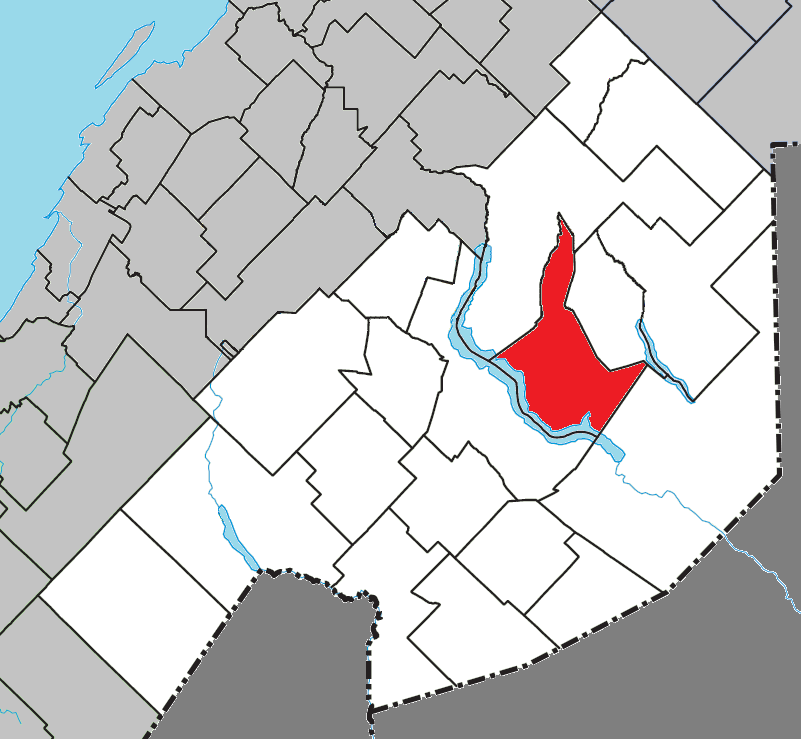
- Location within Témiscouata RCM

- Location in eastern Quebec
- Coordinates: 47°39′N 68°45′W
- Country: Canada
- Province: Quebec
- Region: Bas-Saint-Laurent
- RCM: Témiscouata
- Constituted: May 23, 1923

Government
  - Mayor: Benoît Giguère
  - Federal riding: Côte-du-Sud—Rivière-du-Loup—Kataskomiq—Témiscouata
  - Prov. riding: Rivière-du-Loup–Témiscouata–Les Basques

Area
  - Total: 190.50 km^{2} (73.55 sq mi)
  - Land: 166.94 km^{2} (64.46 sq mi)

Population (2021)
  - Total: 543
  - Density: 3.3/km^{2} (8.5/sq mi)
  - Pop 2016-2021: ▼3.2%
  - Dwellings: 348
- Time zone: UTC−5 (EST)
  - Summer (DST): UTC−4 (EDT)
- Postal code(s): G0L 3R0
- Area codes: 418 and 581
- Highways: R-295
- Website: www.saintjustedulac.com

Saint-Juste-du-Lac (French pronunciation: [sɛ̃ ʒyst dy lak]) is a municipality in the province of Quebec, Canada, located within the Témiscouata Regional County Municipality in the Bas-Saint-Laurent region. As of the Canada 2021 Census, the municipality had a population of 543.

== Demographics ==
Historical Census Data - Saint-Juste-du-Lac, Quebec
Year	Pop.	±%
1931	622	—
1941	955	+53.5%
1951	1,291	+35.2%
1956	1,363	+5.6%
1961	1,290	−5.4%
1966	1,110	−14.0%
1971	936	−15.7%
1976	799	−14.6%
1981	759	−5.0%
1986	720	−5.1%
1991	638	−11.4%
1996	654	+2.5%
2001	657	+0.5%
2006	653	−0.6%
2011	585	−10.4%
2016	561	−4.1%
2021	543	−3.2%

In the 2021 Census of Population conducted by Statistics Canada, Saint-Juste-du-Lac had a population of 543 living in 269 of its 348 total private dwellings, a change of −3.2% from its 2016 population of 561. With a land area of 166.94 km^{2} (64.46 sq mi), it had a population density of 3.3/km^{2} (8.4/sq mi) in 2021.

== See also ==
- Touladi River
- List of municipalities in Quebec
