= Baker-Brook River (New Brunswick) =

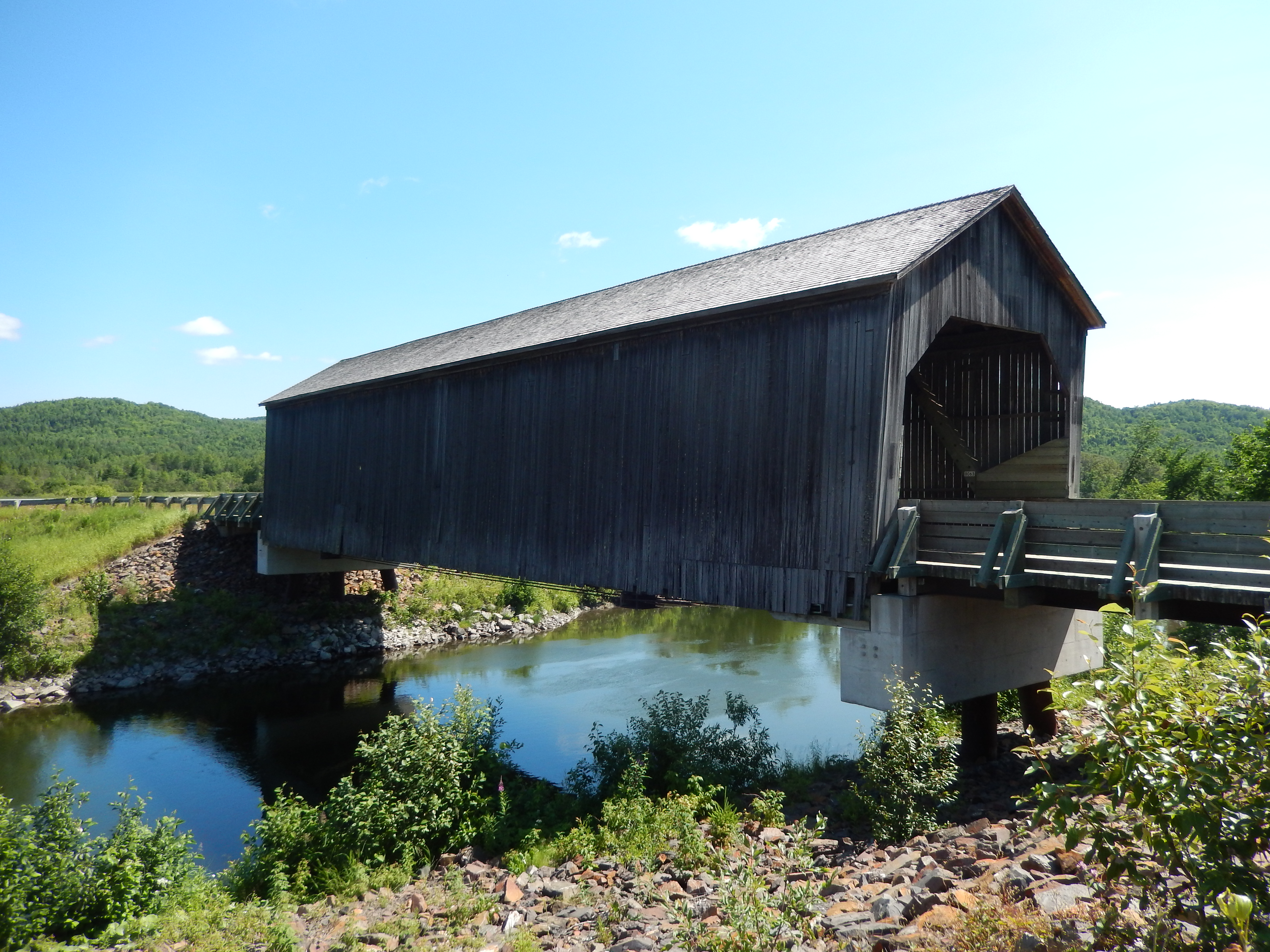
- A bridge across Baker-Brook River

Location
- Country: Canada
- Province: New Brunswick
- County of New Brunswick: Madawaska County

Physical characteristics
- Source
  - location: Lac Baker (New Brunswick)
  - coordinates: 47°21′46″N 69°41′01″W
  - elevation: 201 m (659 ft)
- Mouth
  - location: Saint John River (Bay of Fundy)
  - coordinates: 47°18′01″N 68°30′32″W
  - elevation: 147 m (482 ft)
- Length: 26.3 km (16.3 mi)

Basin features
- Tributaries
  - left: (from de mouth) Sisson brook, Grand-Reed brook, North Baker-Brook River (New Brunswick), Branche à Jerry (Jerry's Branch)

The Baker-Brook River is a tributary of the Saint John River (Bay of Fundy), flowing in Madawaska County, in the northwest part of the New Brunswick, in Canada.

== Geography ==
The Baker-Brook River rises in Lac Baker (New Brunswick) (length: 7.9 kilometres (4.9 mi); height: 205 metres (673 ft)). The northern part of the lake stretches 0.8 kilometres (0.50 mi) toward the northwest at Quebec, in the municipality of Saint-Jean-de-la-Lande, Quebec. This lake has a central island with a length of 1.2 kilometres (0.75 mi) and a maximum width of 0.3 kilometres (0.19 mi), counting about fifty chalets. This lake supplies water from Kitchen Creek (from the West or from the Quebec); the mouth of the latter is located on the provincial border in the northwest part of the lake.

The mouth of the Lac Baker (New Brunswick) is located in the middle of the lake on the northeast shore. This mouth is located at:

- 2.4 kilometres (1.5 mi) south of the border between Quebec and New Brunswick;
- 11.2 kilometres (7.0 mi) northwest of a curve of Saint John River (Bay of Fundy) located in New Brunswick;
- 6.9 kilometres (4.3 mi) south of the center of village of Saint-Jean-de-la-Lande, Quebec which is located in Quebec.

From Lac Baker, the Baker-Brook River flows over 26.3 kilometres (16.3 mi), as follow:

- 2.8 kilometres (1.7 mi) to the northeast, up to the ruisseau à Jerry (English: stream to Jerry) (coming from the northeast);
- 4.6 kilometres (2.9 mi) to the southeast and to the northeast, up to the ruisseau des Ouellette (stream of Ouellette) (coming from northwest);
- 1.3 kilometres (0.81 mi) to the northeast, up to the confluence of the North Baker-Brook River (New Brunswick) (from the West);
- 5.4 kilometres (3.4 mi) to the southeast meandering up to the confluence of the ruisseau Grand Reed (English: Great Reed Creek) (coming from the northeast);
- 4.2 kilometres (2.6 mi) to the southeast, collecting the waters of the Sisson Brook (from the north) up to the highway bridge;
- 8.5 kilometres (5.3 mi) (or 4.8 kilometres (3.0 mi) in direct line) towards the East meandering up to its confluence

The Baker-Brook River flows on the north shore of Saint John River (Bay of Fundy) in Baker Brook, opposite Baker Island that belongs to an archipelago of islands in the area. In this sector, the Saint John River (Bay of Fundy) is the border between Canada (New Brunswick) and the United States (Maine). From the confluence of the Baker-Brook River, the Saint John River (Bay of Fundy) through the New Brunswick to the southeast to the northern shore Bay of Fundy, which s opens to the southwest in the Atlantic Ocean.

The confluence of the Baker-Brook River is located at:

- 22.8 kilometres (14.2 mi) upstream of the confluence of the Madawaska River (Saint John River) which flows into the city of Edmundston;
- 10.1 kilometres (6.3 mi) downstream of the confluence of the Fish River (Maine).

== Toponymy ==
The term "Baker" is an English original family surname.

== See also ==
- Lac Baker (New Brunswick)
- Baker-Lake, New Brunswick, a municipality of New Brunswick
- Baker-Brook, New Brunswick, a municipality of New Brunswick
- Madawaska County, a county New Brunswick
- Saint-François Parish, New Brunswick, a municipality of New Brunswick
- Saint John River (Bay of Fundy), a stream
- List of rivers of New Brunswick
