= Acadian World Congress =

Festival of Acadian and Cajun culture held every five years

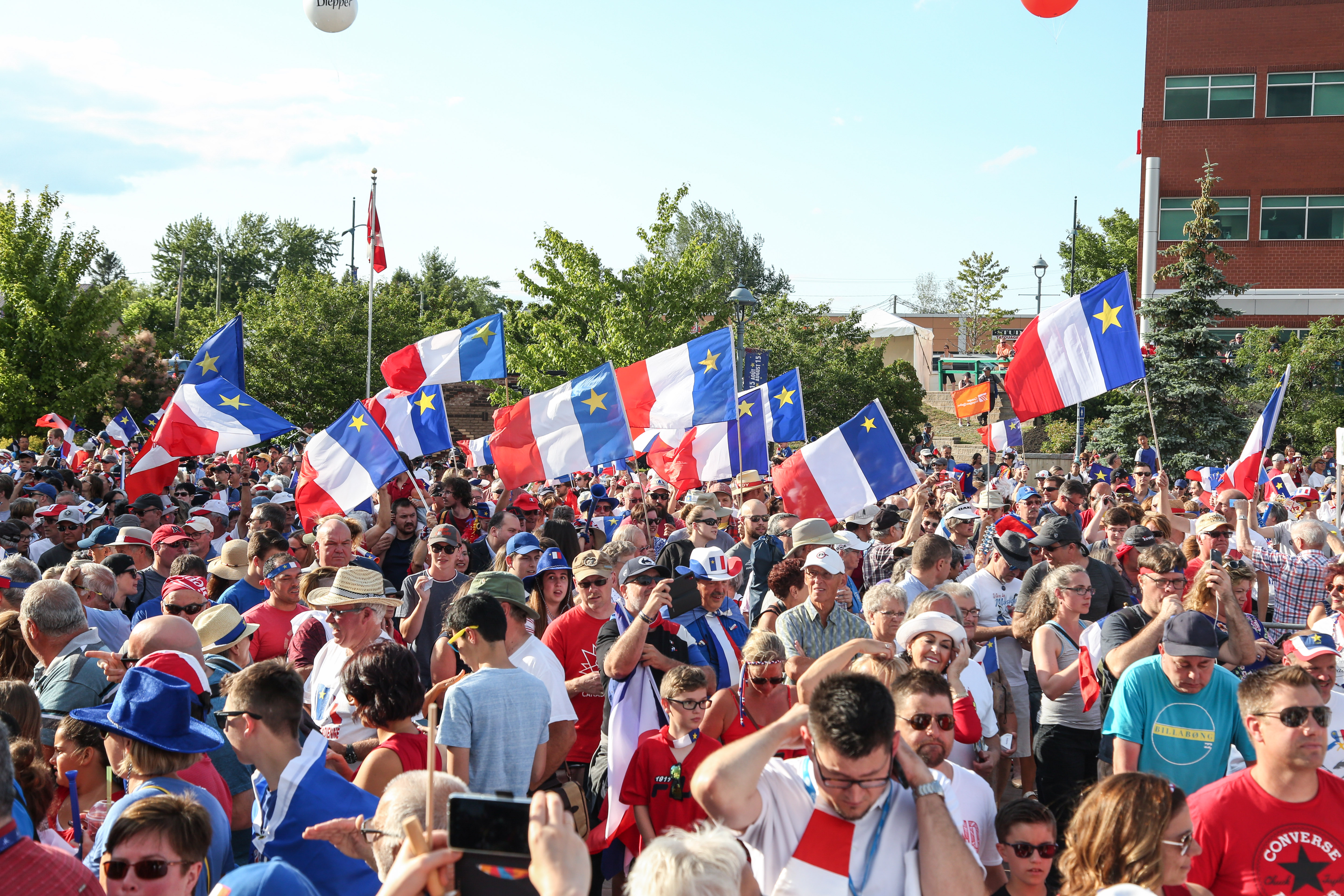
Acadian World Congress in 2019

The Acadian World Congress, or Le Congrès Mondial Acadien, is a festival of Acadian and Cajun culture and history, held every five years. It is also informally known as the Acadian Reunion. Its creator was André Boudreau (1945–2005).

== History ==
An earlier series of Acadian national conventions (:fr:) occurred from 1881 to 1979 in the Atlantic Canada region of Acadia.

=== 1994 World Congress ===
The first World Congress took place from August 12, 1994 to August 22, 1994 in Moncton and in nine other communities in southeastern New Brunswick, including, Bouctouche, Shediac, Saint-Joseph, Richibucto, Cap-Pelé, Dieppe, New Brunswick, Saint-Antoine, Rogersville, Saint-Louis-de-Kent and Saint Thomas. Conferences, shows and family reunions were on the program. The number of participants was estimated at more than 200,000.

The official opening ceremony took place on August 13, 1994 at Aboiteau Beach in Cap-Pelé, in the presence of Jean Chrétien, the Prime Minister of Canada, Boutros Boutros-Ghali, Secretary General of the UN, Frank McKenna, Premier of New Brunswick, Alfred Siefer-Gaillardin, Ambassador of France to Canada, Claude Ryan, Minister of Municipal Affairs of Quebec and Antonine Maillet, writer.

The song, "Sommet des femmes en Acadie" was organized by the Fédération des Dames d'Acadia. The 1994 Acadian World Congress was recognized by UNESCO as an activity of the World Decade for Cultural Development (1988-1997). The president and founder of this first congress was André Boudreau, native of Nigadoo, New Brunswick.

=== 1999 World Congress ===
The second congress was held from July 31, 1999 to August 15, 1999 in several parishes in Louisiana, including, Terrebonne, Lafayette, East Baton Rouge. The 1999 event featured the reunions of over 80 Acadian families, three major concerts (Houma, Oak Alley Plantation, and Lafayette Cajundome), and academic conferences centered on economics, culture, women's issues, genealogy and genetics. The President and executive director of the 1999 event was Brian Gabriel Comeaux of Lafayette, Louisiana.

=== 2004 World Congress ===
The third Congress took place from July 31, 2004 to August 15, 2004 in several Nova Scotia regions in the ancestral Acadia region including Clare, Chéticamp, Grand-Pré, and Halifax, Nova Scotia. The Congress took place during the 400th anniversary of Acadia, for which there was also a program during the year. The theme song was "Je reviens au Berceau de l'Acadie" by Grand Dérangement and Carole Daigle.

The Official Opening took place on July 31 at Université Sainte-Anne and was centered around the theme of the return to ancestral lands. It was followed by cooking parties in halls throughout the southwest of the province. The program included conferences, family gatherings, a "festival of festivals", and a mass. The August 15th mega-show took place on the Halifax Citadel, a place of imprisonment during the deportation of the Acadians.

The Congress President was Allister Surette and the Executive Director was Vaughne Madden.

=== 2009 World Congress ===
The fourth congress took place in the Acadian Peninsula in northeastern New Brunswick from August 7, 2009 to August 23, 2009.

The opening ceremony took place in the region of Lamèque-Shippagan-Miscou, while the closing ceremony was held in the region of Tracadie-Sheila and Neguac. The theme song was "Enfin retrouvés" by Daniel Léger.

The Congress President was Jean-Guy Rioux and the managing director was Robert Frenette.

=== 2014 World Congress ===
The fifth Congress was held along the Canada–United States border, co-hosted by Maine's Aroostook County in the United States and its neighbouring counties in Canada (Témiscouata in Quebec, and Victoria, Madawaska and Restigouche in New Brunswick).

The Congress President was Émilien Nadeau the general director was Léo-Paul Charest.

=== 2019 World Congress ===
The 2019 Congress was held from August 10, 2019 to August 24, 2019 on Prince Edward Island and in southeastern New Brunswick, with its central events held in Summerside.

The Congress' vision was to promote a contemporary Acadia through its urbanity, its rurality and its cooperation.

The kick-off was launched at Abram-Village, Prince Edward Island during a night run on the Confederation Bridge. The closing concert took place in Shediac, New Brunswick.

The Congress President was Claudette Thériault and the general director was Vaughne Madden.

=== 2024 World Congress ===
The 2024 Congress was held in the municipalities of Argyle and Clare in southwestern Nova Scotia.
