= Témiscouata Regional County Municipality =

Témiscouata
- Regional county municipality
- Coordinates: 47°41′N 68°53′W
- Country: Canada
- Province: Quebec
- Region: Bas-Saint-Laurent
- Effective: January 1, 1982
- County seat: Témiscouata-sur-le-Lac

Government
  - Type: Prefecture
  - Prefect: Serge Pelletier

Area
  - Total: 4,025.80 km^{2} (1,554.37 sq mi)
  - Land: 3,904.03 km^{2} (1,507.35 sq mi)

Population (2016)
  - Total: 19,574
  - Density: 5/km^{2} (13/sq mi)
  - Change 2011-2016: ▼4.9%
  - Dwellings: 10,778
- Time zone: UTC−5 (EST)
  - Summer (DST): UTC−4 (EDT)
- Area codes: 418 and 581
- Website: www.mrctemiscouata.qc.ca

Témiscouata (French pronunciation: [temiskwata]) is a regional county municipality in the Bas-Saint-Laurent region of Quebec, Canada. It is located southeast of Rivière-du-Loup, bordering New Brunswick, and is centred on Lake Témiscouata. Its seat is Témiscouata-sur-le-Lac.

Major industries include forestry, agriculture and maple syrup products.

== Subdivisions ==
There are 19 subdivisions within the RCM:

Cities & Towns (4)

- Dégelis
- Lac-des-Aigles
- Pohénégamook
- Témiscouata-sur-le-Lac

Municipalities (11)

- Auclair
- Biencourt
- Lejeune
- Rivière-Bleue
- Saint-Athanase
- Saint-Elzéar-de-Témiscouata
- Saint-Honoré-de-Témiscouata
- Saint-Jean-de-la-Lande
- Saint-Juste-du-Lac
- Saint-Michel-du-Squatec
- Saint-Pierre-de-Lamy

Parishes (4)

- Packington
- Saint-Eusèbe
- Saint-Louis-du-Ha! Ha!
- Saint-Marc-du-Lac-Long

== Demographics ==
=== Population ===
Canada census – Témiscouata Regional County Municipality, Quebec community profile

	2016	2011
Population	19,574 (-4.9% from 2011)	20,572 (-5.6% from 2006)
Land area	3,904.03 km^{2} (1,507.35 sq mi)	3,904.90 km^{2} (1,507.69 sq mi)
Population density		5.3/km^{2} (14/sq mi)
Median age	52.4 (M: 51.7, F: 53.1)	48.7 (M: 47.8, F: 49.4)
Private dwellings	10,778 (total)	10,627 (total)
Median household income	$49,317	$41,662

References: 2016 2011

Historical Census Data - Témiscouata Regional County Municipality, Quebec

Year	Pop.	±%
1991	23,348	—
1996	23,082	−1.1%
2001	22,420	−2.9%

Year	Pop.	±%
2006	21,785	−2.8%
2011	20,572	−5.6%
2016	19,574	−4.9%

=== Language ===
Canada Census Mother Tongue - Témiscouata Regional County Municipality, Quebec
Census	Total	French			English			French & English			Other		
Year	Responses	Count	Trend	Pop %	Count	Trend	Pop %	Count	Trend	Pop %	Count	Trend	Pop %
2016	19,220	19,025	▼9.9%	98.99%	100	▼4.8%	0.52%	35	0.0%	0.18%	60	▲33.3%	0.31%
2011	20,300	20,115	▼3.8%	99.09%	105	▼4.5%	0.52%	35	▼30.0%	0.17%	45	▼70.0%	0.22%
2006	21,220	20,915	▼4.1%	98.56%	110	▲175.0%	0.52%	50	▲25.0%	0.24%	145	▲480.0%	0.68%
2001	21,910	21,805	▼3.2%	99.52%	40	▼42.9%	0.18%	40	▲33.3%	0.18%	25	▲ n/a%	0.11%
1996	22,625	22,525	n/a	99.56%	70	n/a	0.31%	30	n/a	0.13%	0	n/a	0.00%

== Transportation ==
=== Access routes ===
Highways and numbered routes that run through the municipality, including external routes that start or finish at the county border:

- Autoroutes
  - A-85 (TCH)
- Principal highways
  - R-185 (TCH)
- Secondary highways
  - R-232
  - R-289
  - R-295
  - R-296
- External routes
  - Route 2 (TCH)
  - Route 120

== See also ==
- List of regional county municipalities and equivalent territories in Quebec
