= Quebec Route 299 =

Highway in Quebec, Canada

Route 299

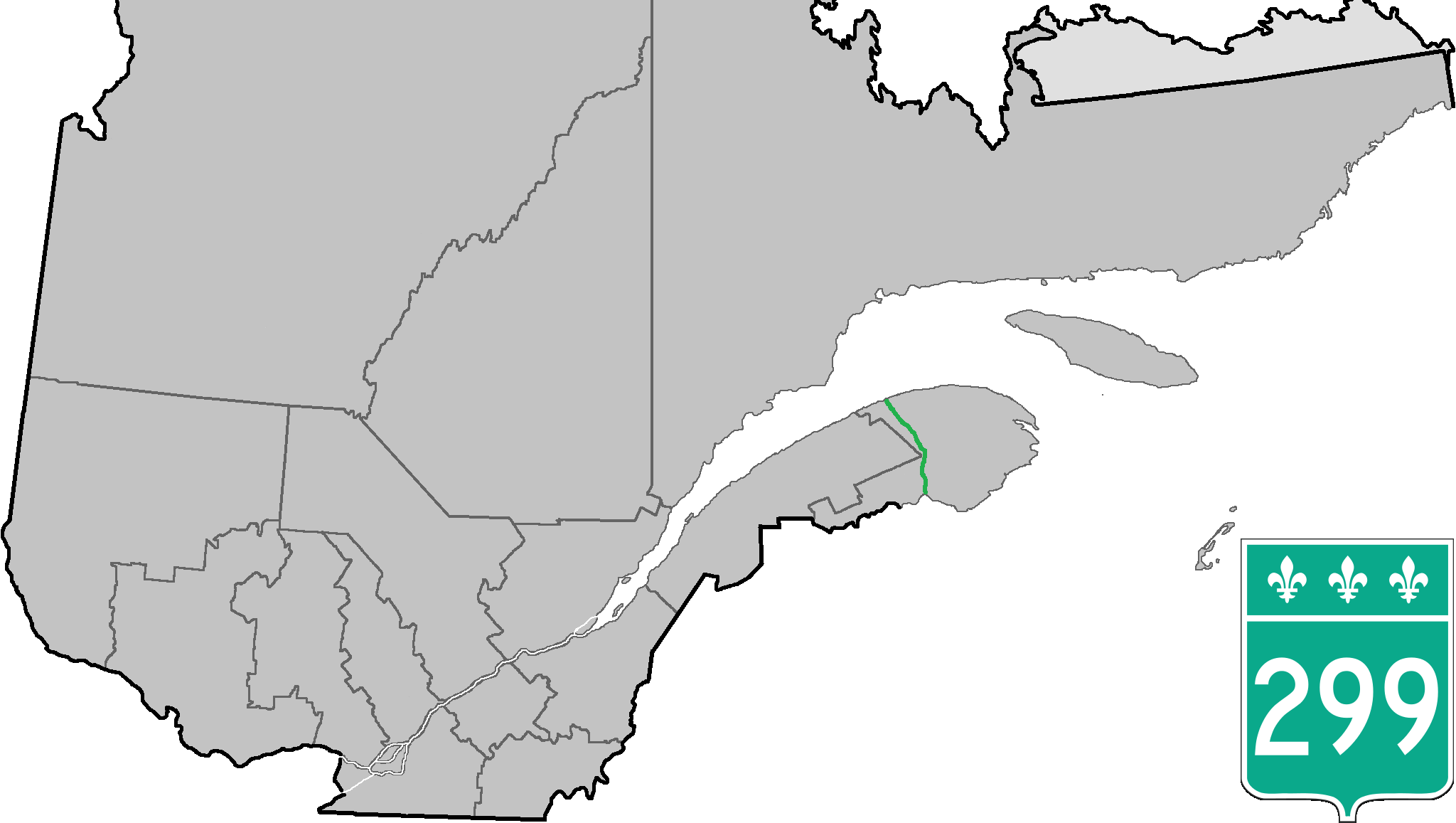

Route information
- Length: 137 km (85 mi)

Major junctions
- South end: R-132 in Cascapédia–Saint-Jules
- North end: R-132 in Sainte-Anne-des-Monts

Location
- Country: Canada
- Province: Quebec
- Major cities: Cascapédia–Saint-Jules, Sainte-Anne-des-Monts

Highway system
- Quebec provincial highways; Autoroutes; List; Former
← R-298	→ R-301

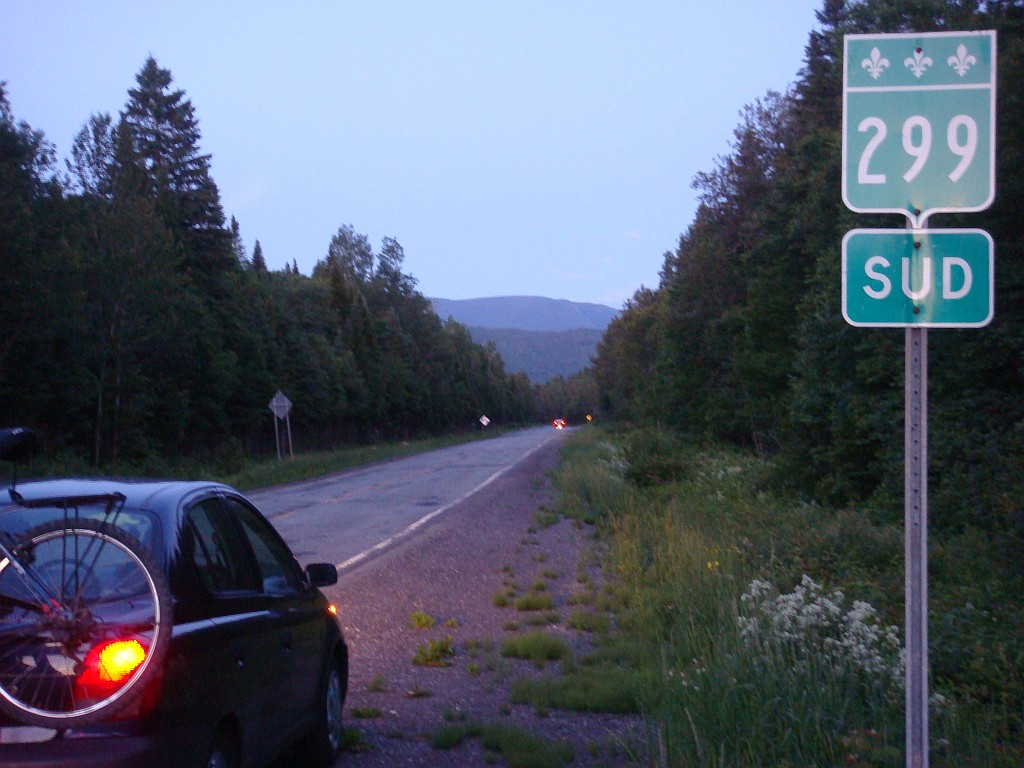
Route 299 at the Gaspésie Park

Route 299 is a 137-kilometre (85 mi) long two-lane highway which cuts through the Appalachian Mountains in Quebec, Canada. It starts at the junction of Route 132 in Cascapédia–Saint-Jules, runs through Gaspésie National Park and ends at the junction of Route 132 in Sainte-Anne-des-Monts. It is an isolated highway with only a few small settlements along the way.

== Municipalities along Route 299 ==
- Cascapédia–Saint-Jules
- Rivière-Bonaventure
- Lac-Casault
- Mont-Albert
- Sainte-Anne-des-Monts
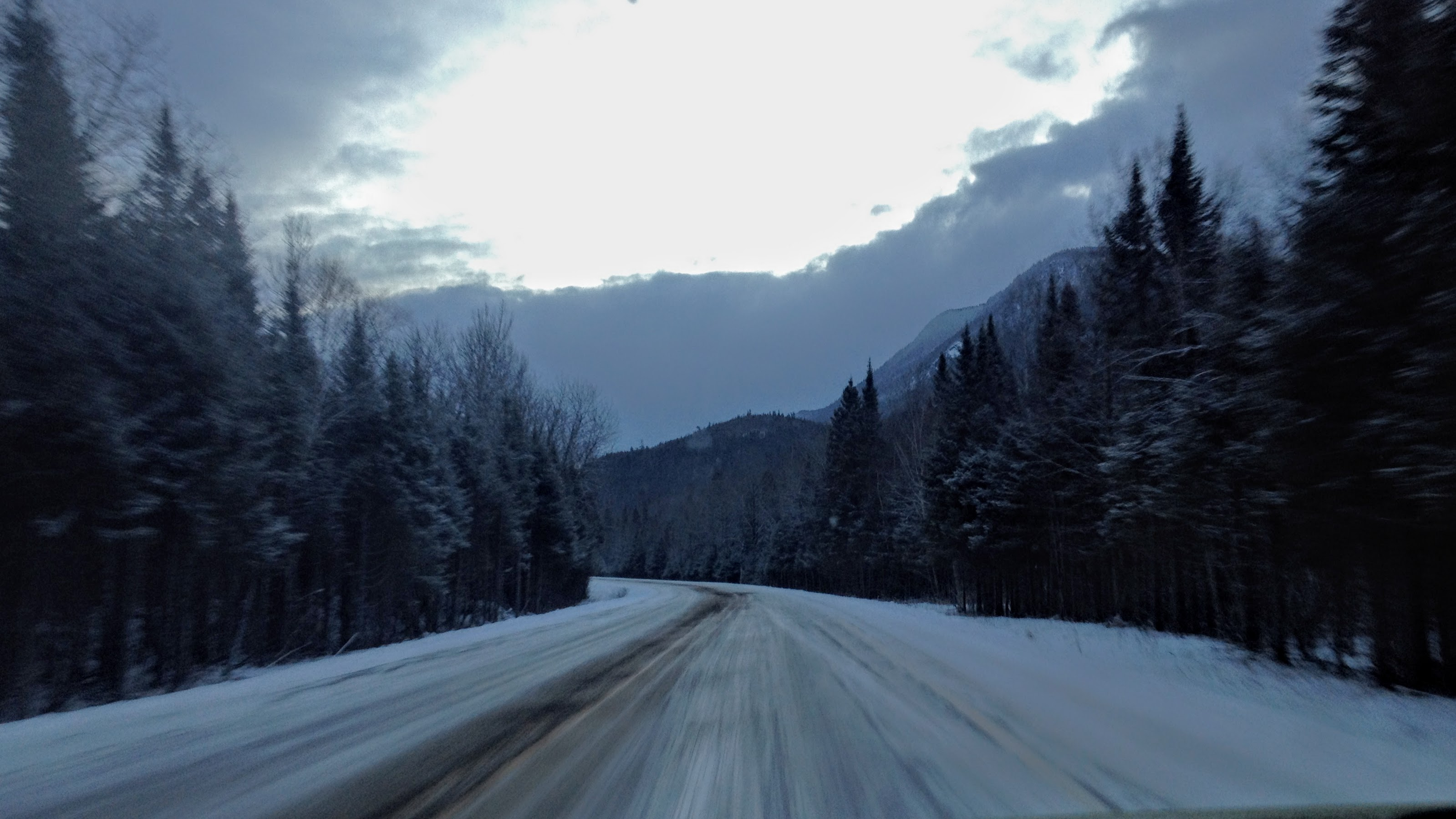
Route 299 near Mount Albert during winter.

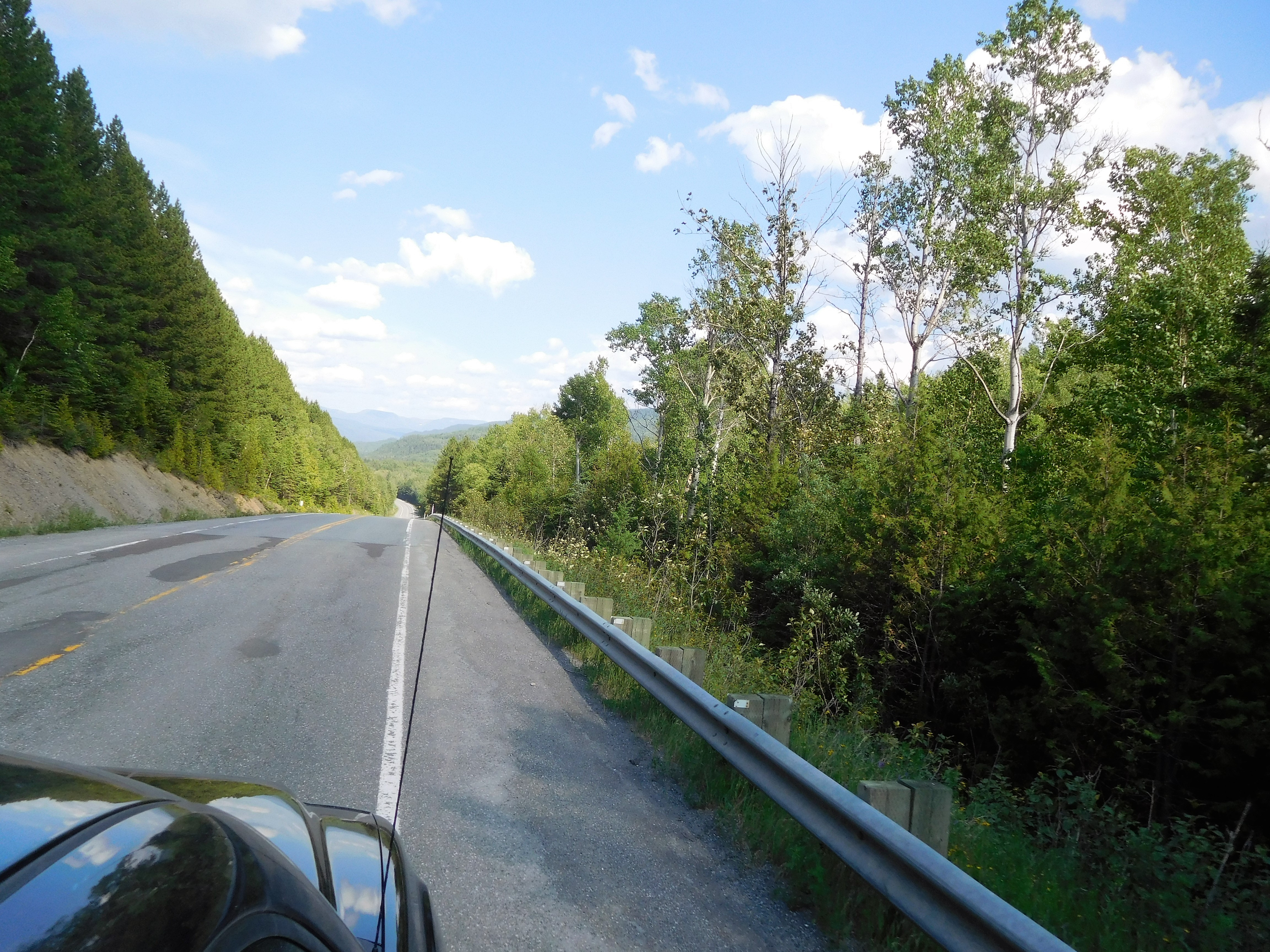
Route 299 towards Chic-Chocs mountains.

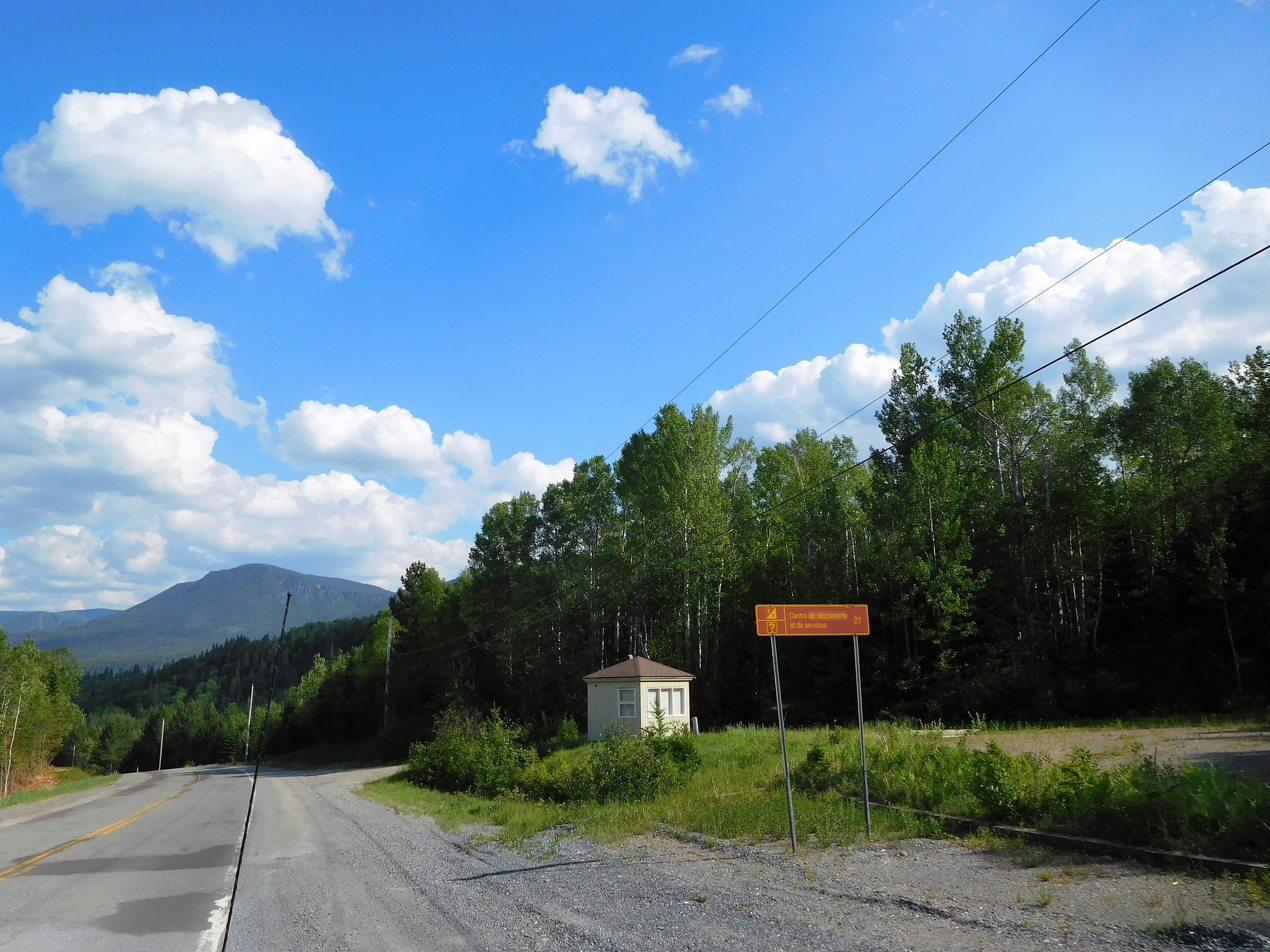
Route 299 entering Gaspésie National Park.

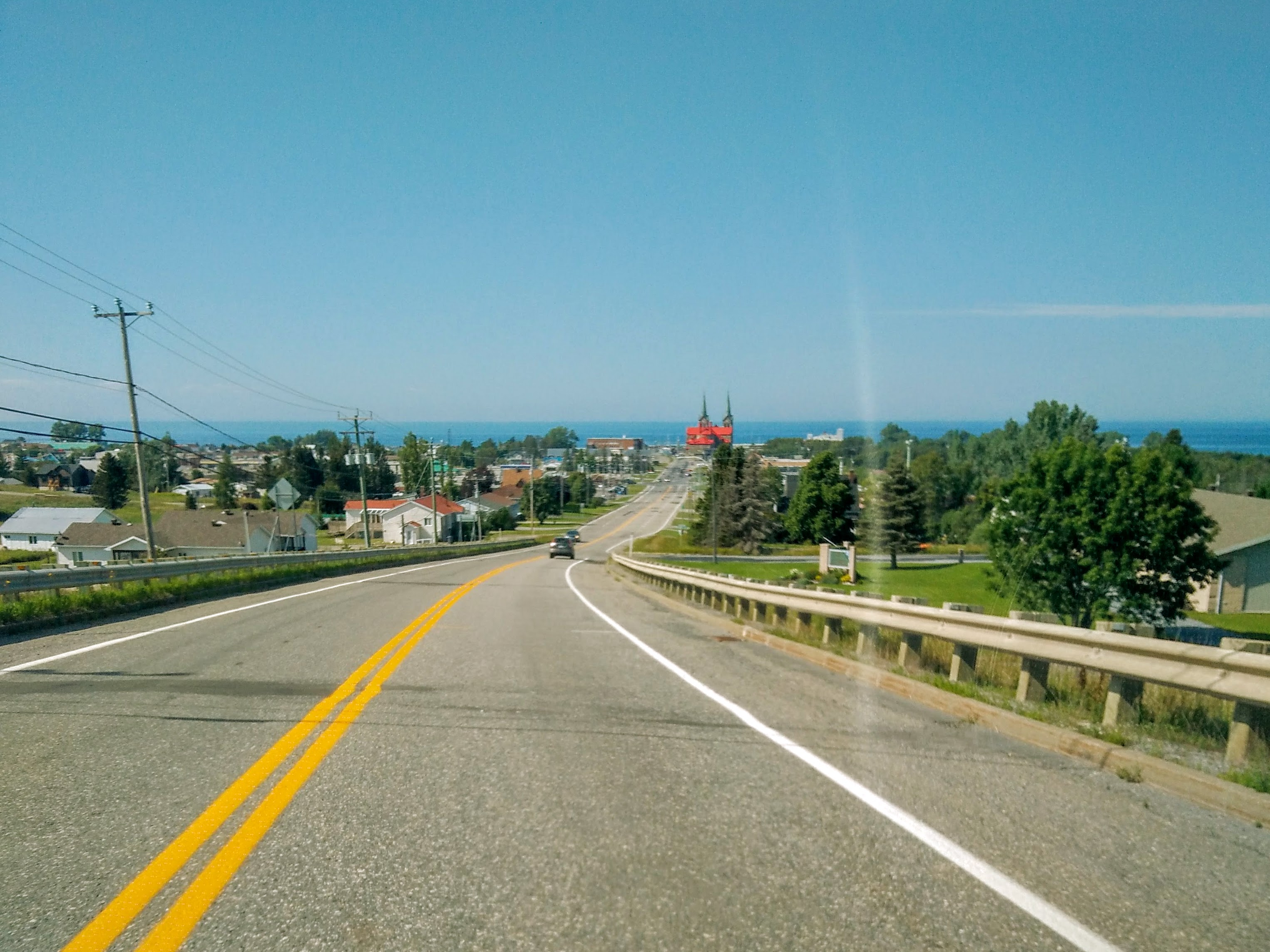
Route 299 descends towards Saint-Lawrence River from the Chic-Chocs mountains.

== Major intersections ==
RCM or ET	Municipality	Km	Road	Notes
Bonaventure	Cascapédia–Saint-Jules	0.0	R-132	Southern terminus of Route 299; 132 WEST: to Maria; 132 EAST: to New Richmond
La Haute-Gaspésie	Mont-Albert	83.0	Route du Lac-Sainte-Anne	EAST: to R-198 in Murdochville
La Haute-Gaspésie	Mont-Albert	99.5	Centre de découverte et de services du Parc national de la Gaspésie	To Gaspésie National Park
La Haute-Gaspésie	Sainte-Anne-des-Monts	138	R-132	132 WEST: to Cap-Chat; 132 EAST: to La Martre; Northern terminus of Route 299

== See also ==
- List of Quebec provincial highways
