= Quebec Route 132 =

Highway in Quebec

Route 132

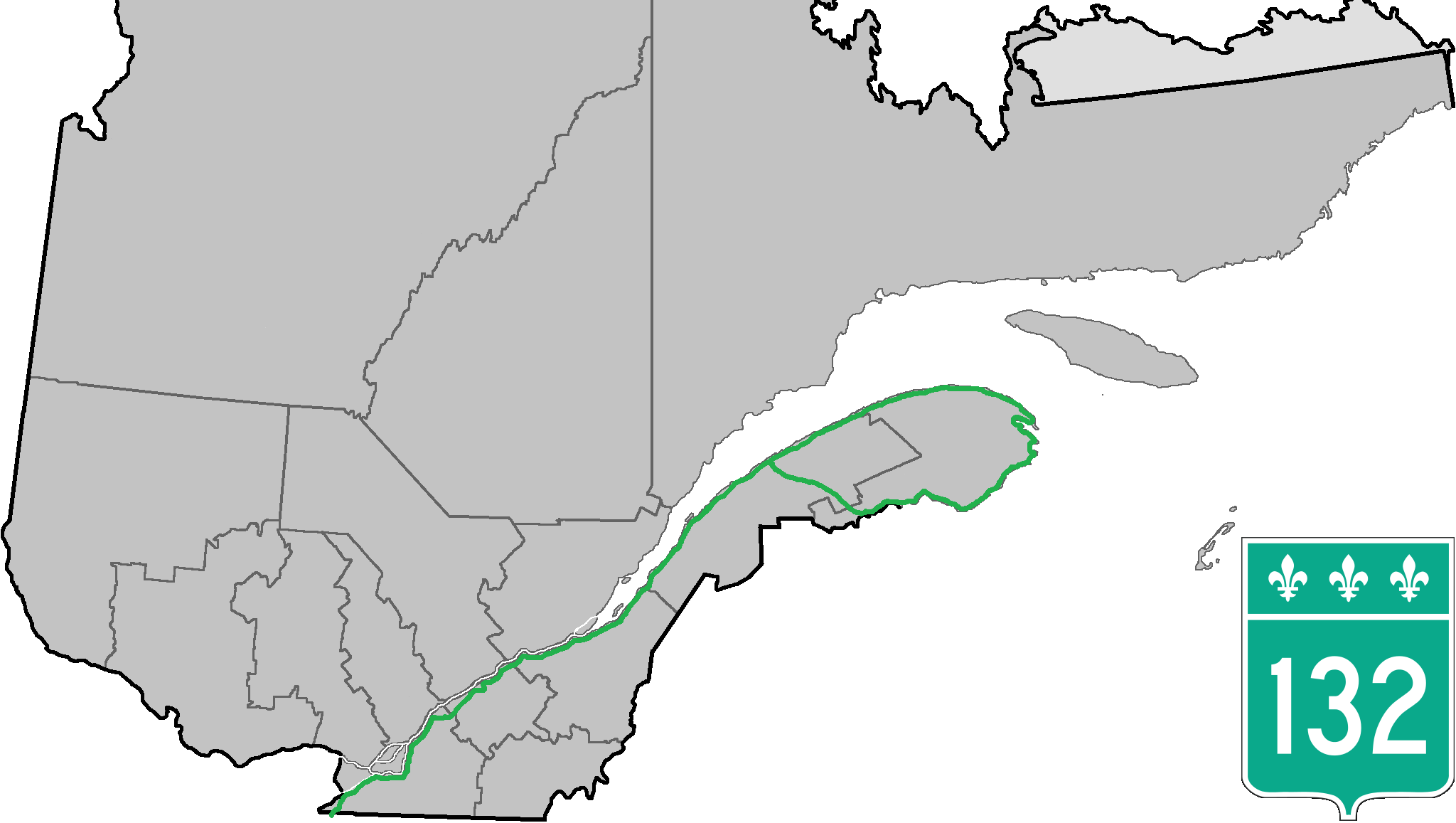

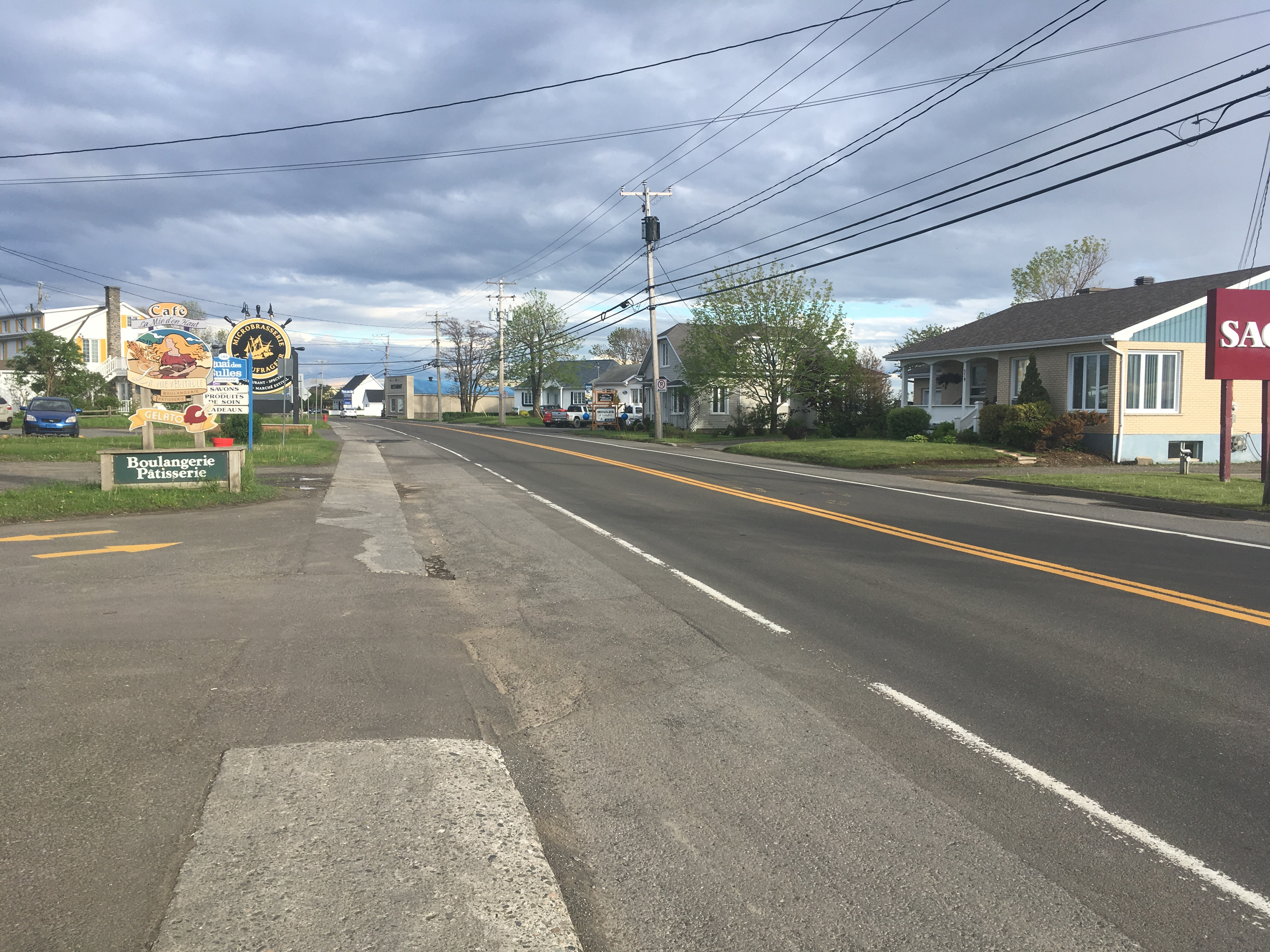
- Route 132 in Carleton-sur-Mer

Route information
- Maintained by Transports Québec
- Length: 1,612.1 km (1,001.7 mi)
- History: Route 2 (Lévis – Rivière-du-Loup); Route 3 (U.S. border – Lévis); Route 6 (around the Gaspé Peninsula); Route 9C (Kahnawake – Candiac); Route 10 (Rivière-du-Loup – Matane)

Major junctions
- West end: NY 970T to NY 37 at the U.S. border in Dundee
- R-138 in Kahnawake; A-10 / A-15 / A-20 in Brossard; R-112 in Saint-Lambert; A-20 / A-25 / R-134 in Longueuil; A-30 / A-55 in Bécancour; A-73 / R-116 / R-173 / R-175 in Lévis; A-20 in Rimouski; R-132 in Sainte-Flavie; R-198 in Saint-Maxime-du-Mont-Louis; Route 11 in Matapédia
- East end: R-132 in Sainte-Flavie (via the Gaspé Peninsula)

Location
- Country: Canada
- Province: Quebec
- Major cities: Longueuil, Lévis, Brossard

Highway system
- Quebec provincial highways; Autoroutes; List; Former
← R-131	→ R-133

Route 132 is the longest highway in Quebec. It follows the south shore of the Saint Lawrence River from the border with the state of New York in the hamlet of Dundee (connecting with New York State Route 37 (NY 37) via NY 970T, an unsigned reference route, north of Massena), west of Montreal to the Gulf of Saint Lawrence and circles the Gaspé Peninsula. This highway is known as the Navigator's Route. It passes through the Montérégie, Centre-du-Québec, Chaudière-Appalaches, Bas-Saint-Laurent and Gaspésie regions of the province.

Unlike the more direct Autoroute 20, which it shadows from Longueuil to Sainte-Luce, Route 132 takes a more scenic route which goes through many historic small towns. Until the connection between Rivière-du-Loup and Rimouski is completed, this highway provides a link between the two sections of Autoroute 20. At Rivière-du-Loup, the Trans-Canada Highway continues south on Autoroute 85 to Edmundston, New Brunswick. This eastern section of the highway, from Rivière-du-Loup towards Gaspé, was the former Route 6, until the early 1970s realignment of route numbers into a grid.

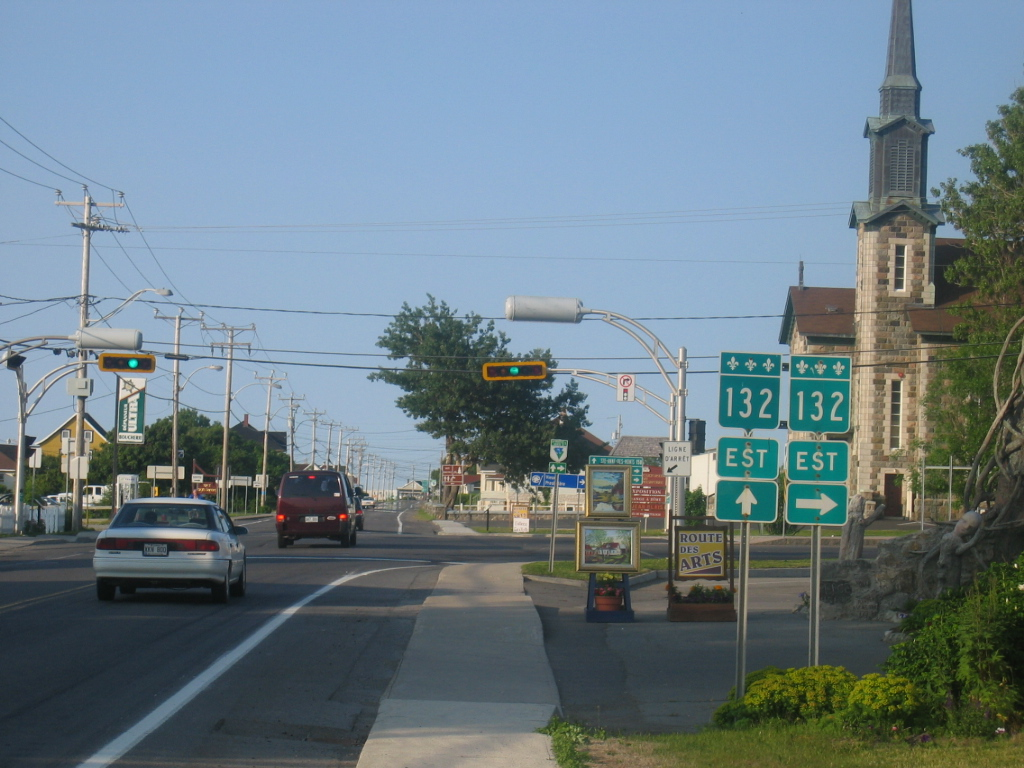
Route 132 split in Sainte-Flavie

At Sainte-Flavie, the highway splits and one branch turns south following the valley of the Matapédia River to reach the New Brunswick border near Campbellton, joining New Brunswick Route 11, a major highway along that province's eastern coast. The other branch continues east to follow the coast of the Gaspé peninsula and eventually rejoin the other branch at Matapédia. The total length of this loop is over 930 km.

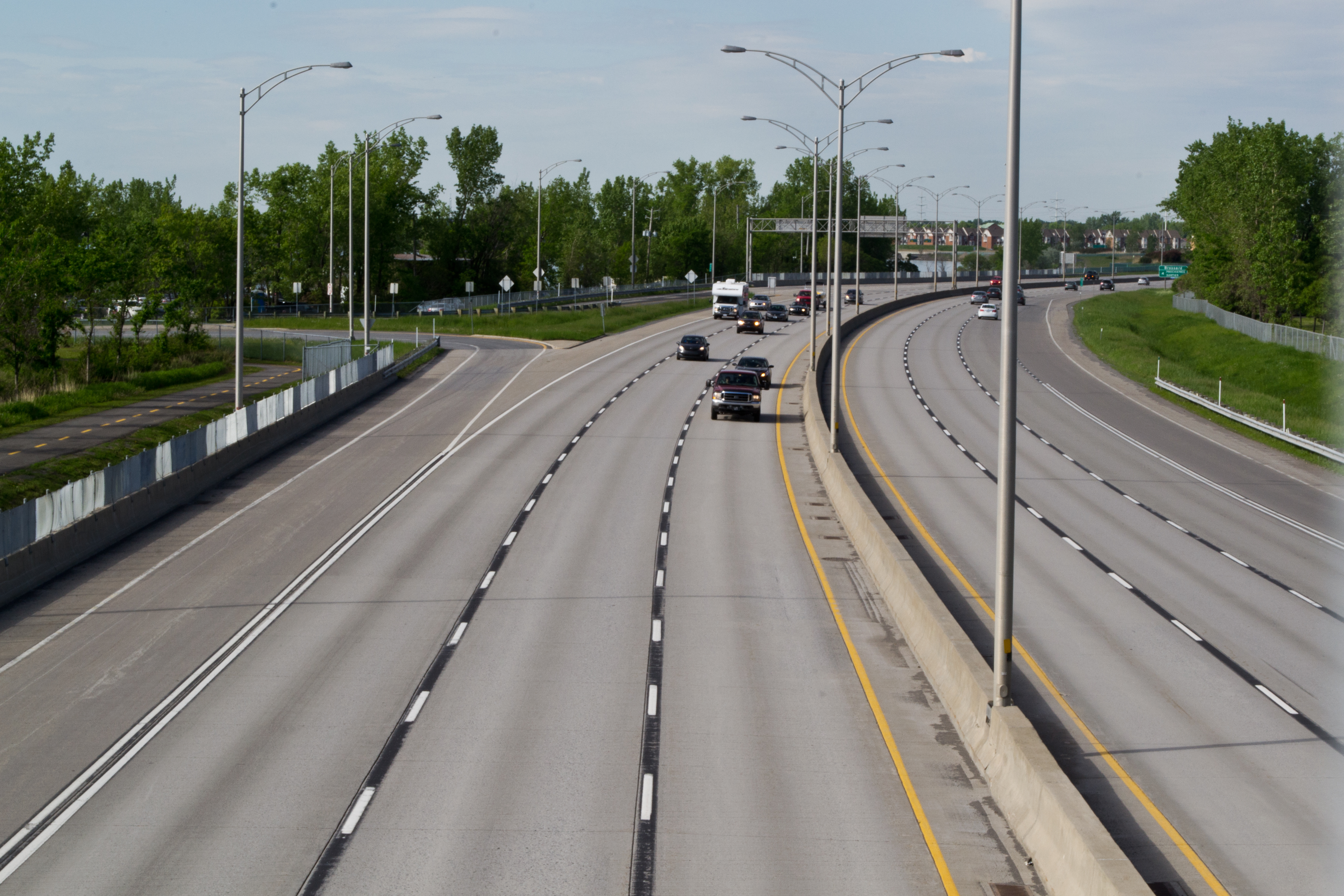
Route 132 in La Prairie

Between Candiac and Varennes, the highway overlaps various current and former Quebec Autoroutes and can be considered a continuous autoroute by itself, as it runs along the Saint Lawrence River through most of this section. Highway 132 joins Autoroute 15 in Candiac at its Exit 42 and overlaps it until Exit 53 (on the other side Exit 75 of Autoroute 20), in Brossard, where Autoroute 15 separates onto Champlain Bridge. There, Highway 132 begins its overlap with Autoroute 20 until Boucherville, where Autoroute 20 splits off onto Autoroute Jean-Lesage. From that point, Highway 132 continues to the east of Boucherville as a four-lane expressway formerly known as Autoroute 430 and downgrades to a two-lane highway in Varennes. The section of Highway 132 that overlaps Autoroute 15 & Autroute 20 was named Autoroute René-Lévesque.

== Municipalities along Route 132 ==
- Dundee
- Saint-Anicet
- Sainte-Barbe
- Saint-Stanislas-de-Kostka
- Salaberry-de-Valleyfield
- Beauharnois
- Léry
- Châteauguay
- Kahnawake
- Sainte-Catherine
- Saint-Constant
- Delson
- Candiac
- La Prairie
- Brossard
- Saint-Lambert
- Longueuil
- Boucherville
- Varennes
- Verchères
- Contrecoeur
- Sorel-Tracy
- Saint-Robert
- Yamaska
- Saint-Gerard-Majella
- Saint-François-du-Lac
- Odanak
- Pierreville
- Baie-du-Febvre
- Nicolet
- Bécancour
- Saint-Pierre-les-Becquets
- Deschaillons-sur-Saint-Laurent
- Leclercville
- Lotbinière
- Sainte-Croix
- Saint-Antoine-de-Tilly
- Lévis
- Beaumont
- Saint-Michel-de-Bellechasse
- Saint-Vallier
- Berthier-sur-Mer
- Montmagny
- Cap-Saint-Ignace
- L'Islet
- Saint-Jean-Port-Joli
- Saint-Roch-des-Aulnaies
- La Pocatière
- Rivière-Ouelle
- Saint-Denis-De La Bouteillerie
- Kamouraska
- Saint-Germain-de-Kamouraska
- Saint-André-de-Kamouraska
- Notre-Dame-du-Portage
- Rivière-du-Loup
- Cacouna
- L'Isle-Verte
- Notre-Dame-des-Neiges
- Trois-Pistoles
- Saint-Simon-de-Rimouski
- Saint-Fabien
- Rimouski
- Sainte-Luce
- Sainte-Flavie (Route 132 splits at this point,
  heading east and south to complete a loop)
- Grand-Métis
- Métis-sur-Mer
- Baie-des-Sables
- Saint-Ulric
- Matane
- Sainte-Felicité
- Grosses-Roches
- Les Méchins
- Cap-Chat
- Sainte-Anne-des-Monts
- La Martre
- Marsoui
- Rivière-à-Claude
- Mont-Saint-Pierre
- Saint-Maxime-du-Mont-Louis
- Sainte-Madeleine-de-la-Rivière-Madeleine
- Grande-Vallée
- Petite-Vallée
- Cloridorme
- Rivière-Saint-Jean
- Gaspé
- Percé
- Sainte-Thérèse-de-Gaspé
- Grande-Rivière
- Chandler
- Port-Daniel–Gascons
- Shigawake
- Saint-Godefroi
- Hope Town
- Hope
- Paspébiac
- New Carlisle
- Bonaventure
- Saint-Siméon
- Caplan
- New Richmond
- Cascapédia–Saint-Jules
- Gesgapegiag
- Maria
- Carleton-sur-Mer
- Nouvelle
- Escuminac
- Pointe-à-la-Croix
- Listuguj
- Ristigouche-Sud-Est
- Matapédia
- Saint-André-de-Restigouche
- Routhierville
- Sainte-Florence
- Causapscal
- Lac-au-Saumon
- Amqui
- Val-Brillant
- Sayabec
- Saint-Moise
- Sainte-Jeanne-d'Arc-de-la-Mitis
- Sainte-Angele-de-Merici
- Saint-Joseph-de-Lepage
- Mont-Joli
- Sainte-Flavie

== Major intersections ==
RCM	Location	km	mi	Old exit	New exit	Destinations	Notes
Le Haut-Saint-Laurent	Dundee	0.0	0.0			NY 970T south to NY 37 – Fort Covington	Continues into New York
Le Haut-Saint-Laurent	Dundee	0.0	0.0	Canada–United States border at Fort Covington–Dundee Border Crossing			
Le Haut-Saint-Laurent	Huntingdon	38.2	23.7			R-202 east – Huntingdon	
Beauharnois-Salaberry	Saint-Stanislas-de-Kostka	42.8	26.6			R-236 east – Saint-Stanislas-de-Kostka, Saint-Louis-de-Gonzague	R-236 western terminus
Beauharnois-Salaberry	Saint-Stanislas-de-Kostka	46	29			R-201 south – Ormstown, Franklin	West end of R-201 concurrency
Canal de Beauharnois		46.8– 47.8	29.1– 29.7	Pont Larocque (Larocque Bridge)			
Beauharnois-Salaberry	Salaberry-de-Valleyfield	48.1	29.9			A-530 begins / Chemin Larocque – Salaberry-de-Valleyfield (Centre-Ville)	At grade; A-530 western terminus; west end of A-530 concurrency
Beauharnois-Salaberry	Salaberry-de-Valleyfield	53.1	33.0		5	A-530 east to A-30 – Vaudreuil-Dorion, Sorel-Tracy	A-530 exit 5; east end of A-530 concurrency
Beauharnois-Salaberry	Salaberry-de-Valleyfield	55.2	34.3			R-201 north (Monseigneur-Langlois Boulevard) to A-20 / Boulevard Hébert – Salaberry-de-Valleyfield (Centre-Ville), Coteau-du-Lac	R-132 follows Boulevard Hébert; west end of R-201 concurrency
Beauharnois-Salaberry	Salaberry-de-Valleyfield	60.1	37.3			To A-30 / Boulevard Pie-XII – Saint-Louis-de-Gonzague	A-30 exit 9
Beauharnois-Salaberry	Salaberry-de-Valleyfield	63.2	39.3			A-30 (Pont Serge-Marcil)	Passes under Serge-Marcil Bridge; no access
Canal de Beauharnois		70	43	Tunnel de Melocheville (Melocheville Tunnel)			
Canal de Beauharnois		70	43	Pont Boulevard Edgar-Hébert (Edgar Hébert Boulevard Bridge)			
Beauharnois-Salaberry	Beauharnois	72.5	45.0			R-236 west to A-30 – Saint-Étienne-de-Beauharnois	R-236 eastern terminus
Beauharnois-Salaberry	Beauharnois	75	47			R-205 south (Chemin de la Beauce) to A-30	
Roussillon	Mercier–Châteauguay boundary	88.7	55.1			A-30 – Vaudreuil-Dorion, Sorel-Tracy; R-138 west (Boulevard Saint-Jean-Baptiste) / Boulevard Saint-Joseph / Rue Beauchemin – Mercier	A-30 exit 38; west end of R-138 concurrency
Kahnawake		97	60		-	R-207 south / R-221 south – Kahnawake, Saint-Isidore, Saint-Rémi	Interchange; northern terminus of R-207 & R-221
Kahnawake		98	61		–	R-138 east – Pont Mercier, Montréal	Interchange; east end of R-138 concurrency
Roussillon	Sainte-Catherine	102.6	63.8			A-730 south to A-30 – Vaudreuil-Dorion, Sorel-Tracy	At grade; A-730 northern terminus
Roussillon	Sainte-Catherine	106	66			Rue Saint-Pierre (R-209 south) / Boulevard des Écluses – Sainte-Catherine, Saint-Rémi	
Roussillon	Delson	108	67			Rue Principale	At-grade; westbound jughandle; west end of freeway
Roussillon	Delson–Candiac boundary	108	67		–	Chemin Saint-François-Xavier / Avenue de Fouquet	
Roussillon	Candiac	109– 111	68– 69		42	A-930 east to A-30 – Sorel-Tracy, Québec A-15 south to A-30 west / I-87 south – New York	West end of A-15 concurrency; A-930 is unsigned; exit numbers follow A-15
Roussillon	Candiac	109– 111	68– 69	Autoroute René-Lévesque west end			
Roussillon	Candiac	113	70		44	Boulevard Montcalm – Candiac	
Roussillon	Candiac	113	70		45	R-134 east (Boulevard Taschereau) – La Prairie	Eastbound exit and westbound entrance; R-134 eastern terminus
Roussillon	La Prairie	115	71		46	Boulevard Salaberry – La Prairie	
Roussillon	La Prairie	116	72		47	Rue Saint-Henri – La Prairie	Eastbound exit and entrance
Roussillon	La Prairie	116	72		49	Rue du Quai	Westbound exit and entrance; to Parc de la Marina
Longueuil	Brossard	118	73		50	Boulevard Matte / Boulevard Rivard	Boulevard Rivard appears on westbound signage
Longueuil	Brossard	119	74		51	Boulevard Rivard / Rue Riviera	Boulevard Rivard on eastbound signage; Rue Riviera on southbound signage
Longueuil	Brossard	120	75		52	Boulevard Rome	Eastbound exit
Longueuil	Brossard	121– 122	75– 76		53; 75	A-10 / A-15 north / A-20 west – Pont Champlain, Montréal, Sherbrooke, Québec	A-10 exit 6; east end of A-15 concurrency; west end of A-20 concurrency; eastbound signed as exit 53; westbound signed as exit 75; exit numbers follow A-20
Longueuil	Saint-Lambert	123	76	1	76	Boulevard Simard	
Longueuil	Saint-Lambert	125	78	3	78	R-112 (Boulevard Laurier) – Pont Victoria, Montréal	Westbound signed as exits 78-O (west) and 78-E (east); eastbound access to R-112 west via exit 79
Longueuil	Saint-Lambert	126	78	6	79	Avenue Notre-Dame	
Longueuil	Longueuil	128	80	7	81	Boulevard Lafayette	Eastbound exit and entrance
Longueuil	Longueuil	128	80	8	82	R-134 (Boulevard Taschereau) – Pont Jacques-Cartier, Montréal	
Longueuil	Longueuil	132	82	11	85	Boulevard Roland-Therrien	
Longueuil	Longueuil	135	84	15	89	A-25 north / A-20 (TCH) east to A-40 / A-30 / Boulevard Marie-Victorin – Tunnel Louis-H.-Lafontaine, Montréal, Québec, Sorel-Tracy	Signed as exits 89-N (north) and 89-E (east); east end of A-20 concurrency; A-25 / A-20 west exit 90; A-25 southern terminus; Trans-Canada Highway follows A-25 north / A-20 east (unsigned from R-132)
Longueuil	Longueuil	135	84	Autoroute René-Lévesque east end			
Longueuil	Boucherville	136	85	17	136	Boulevard Marie-Victorin	
Longueuil	Boucherville	137	85	18	137	Boulevard De Montarville	
Longueuil	Boucherville	137.5	85.4	19	138	Rue Samuel de Champlain	Eastbound exit only
Longueuil	Boucherville	138.9	86.3			Rue De Montbrun	At-grade; east end of freeway
Marguerite-D'Youville	Varennes	144	89			R-229 south (Boulevard Lionel-Boulet) / Boulevard de la Marine – Sainte-Julie	
Marguerite-D'Youville	Contrecœur	180.9	112.4			To A-30 / Montée Saint-Roch – Saint-Roch-de-Richelieu	To R-223
Pierre-De Saurel	Sorel-Tracy	197.1	122.5			Rue Saint-Joseph / Chemin Saint-Roch (R-223 south) / Montée Saint-Roch – Saint-Roch-de-Richelieu	One-way pair; R-223 northern terminus
Pierre-De Saurel	Sorel-Tracy	198.3	123.2			Rue Élisabeth (R-133) – Sorel ferry terminal, Saint-Hyacinthe	Ferry connection Saint-Ignace-de-Loyola and R-158
Pierre-De Saurel	Sorel-Tracy	200.3	124.5			To A-30 west / Boulevard Poliquin – Montréal	Connects to A-30 eastern terminus (main section)
Pierre-De Saurel	Yamaska	216.4	134.5			R-235 south – Massueville	
Pierre-De Saurel	Yamaska–Saint-Gérard-Majella boundary	220	140			R-122 south – Drummondville	
Nicolet-Yamaska	Saint-François-du-Lac	227.7	141.5			R-143 south – Drummondville	
Nicolet-Yamaska	Pierreville	228.4	141.9			R-226 east – Saint-Elphège	
Nicolet-Yamaska	Baie-du-Febvre	241	150			R-255 south – Saint-Zephirin-de-Courval	
Nicolet-Yamaska	Nicolet	255	158			R-259 south – Sainte-Monique	
Bécancour	Bécancour	268	167			A-30 east / A-55 – Bécancour	A-30 western terminus (Bécancour section)
Bécancour	Bécancour	269– 270	167– 170			A-55 – Trois-Rivières, Victoriaville	A-55 exit 176; passes under Laviolette Bridge
Bécancour	Bécancour	283	176			A-30 west – Trois-Rivières, Drummondville	At-grade; west end of A-30 concurrency
Bécancour	Bécancour	286	178			R-261 south / Boulevard Arthur-Sicard – Sainte-Gertrude	
Bécancour	Bécancour	289	180			Boulevard Alphonse-Deshaies	A-30 eastern terminus (Bécancour section); east end of A-30 concurrency
Bécancour	Bécancour	296.5	184.2			R-263 south – Sainte-Marie-de-Blandford	
Bécancour	Saint-Pierre-les-Becquets	309.5	192.3			R-218 east – Sainte-Cécile-de-Lévrard, Sainte-Sophie-de-Lévrard	
Bécancour	Deschaillons-sur-Saint-Laurent	319.5	198.5			R-265 south – Parisville	
Lotbinière	Sainte-Croix	357.5	222.1			R-271 south – Notre-Dame-du-Sacré-Coeur-d'Issoudun, Laurier-Station	
Lotbinière	Saint-Antoine-de-Tilly	371	231			R-273 south – Saint-Apollinaire	
Lévis		387	240			R-171 south (Route Lagueux) to A-20	
Lévis		395	245			R-116 west (Route des Rivières) to A-20	
Lévis		396	246			A-73 (Pont Pierre-Laporte)	Passes under Pierre-Laporte Bridge; no access
Lévis		396	246			R-175 north (Boulevard Guillaume-Couture) – Pont de Québec, Québec	Interchange; west end of R-175 concurrency; R-132 follows Boulevard Guillaume-Couture
Lévis		420.6	261.3			Avenue des Églises (R-175 south) to A-20 / A-73 / Chemin du Sault – Rivière-du-Loup, Montréal, Pont Pierre-Laporte	East end of R-175 concurrency
Lévis		424.0	263.5			Avenue Taniata (R-275 south) to A-20	
Lévis		431.2	267.9			Route du Président-Kennedy (R-173 south) to A-20	
Lévis		431.7	268.2			Boulevard Alphonse-Desjardins – Lévis ferry terminal	Ferry connection to Quebec City
Bellechasse	Beaumont	443.8	275.8			R-279 south to A-20 – Saint-Charles-de-Bellechasse	
Bellechasse	Saint-Michel-de-Bellechasse	454.6	282.5			R-281 south to A-20 – La Durantaye, Saint-Raphaël	
Montmagny	Montmagny	484.9	301.3			R-228 west (Chemin des Poirier) to A-20	
Montmagny	Montmagny	485.9	301.9			R-283 south (Avenue de la Fabrique) – Saint-Fabien-de-Panet	
L'Islet	L'Islet	507.7	315.5			R-285 south to A-20 – L'Islet	
L'Islet	Saint-Jean-Port-Joli	521.4	324.0			R-204 west to A-20 – Saint-Aubert	
L'Islet	Saint-Roch-des-Aulnaies	538.6	334.7			A-20 (TCH) – Québec, Rivière-du-Loup	A-20 exit 430
Kamouraska	La Pocatière	544.5	338.3			A-20 (TCH) – Québec, Rivière-du-Loup	A-20 exit 436
Kamouraska	La Pocatière	545.3	338.8			R-230 east (6^{e} Avenue) – La Pocatière	
Kamouraska	La Pocatière	547.6	340.3			To A-20 / Route du Quai – La Pocatière Centre-Ville	A-20 exit 439
Kamouraska	La Pocatière–Rivière-Ouelle boundary	538.6	334.7			A-20 (TCH) – Québec, Rivière-du-Loup	A-20 exit 444
Kamouraska	Saint-Denis-De La Bouteillerie	565.9	351.6			R-287 south to A-20 – Saint-Philippe-de-Neri	
Kamouraska	Saint-André-de-Kamouraska	598.2	371.7			R-289 south to A-20 – Saint-André-de-Kamouraska	
Rivière-du-Loup	Rivière-du-Loup	612.8	380.8			A-20 – Québec, Rimouski	A-20 exit 503
Rivière-du-Loup	Rivière-du-Loup	613.5	381.2			To A-85 south / Boulevard de l'Hôtel-de-Ville / Rue Ernest-Paradis	
Rivière-du-Loup	Rivière-du-Loup	616.1	382.8			Rue Lafontaine	Former R-185; to R-291 south
Rivière-du-Loup	Rivière-du-Loup	617.9	383.9			A-20 – Québec, Rimouski	A-20 exit 507
Rivière-du-Loup	Rivière-du-Loup	618.8	384.5			Rue Hayward – Rivière-du-Loup ferry terminal	Ferry connection to Saint-Siméon
Rivière-du-Loup	Cacouna	626.2	389.1			To A-20 / Route de l'Église – Saint-Arsène	To R-191 south / A-85
Rivière-du-Loup	Cacouna	632.9	393.3			To A-20 / Route Moreault – Rivière-du-Loup, Rimouski	A-20 exit 521
Rivière-du-Loup	L'Isle-Verte	639.9	397.6			To A-20 / Montée des Coteaux	A-20 exit 527
Les Basques	Notre-Dame-des-Neiges	654.9	406.9			A-20 west – Rivière-du-Loup, Québec	At-grade; A-20 eastern terminus (main section); A-20 exit 542
Les Basques	Trois-Pistoles	664.3	412.8			R-293 south / Rue Jean-Rioux – Saint-Jean-de-Dieu, Saint-Cyprien, Trois-Pistoles ferry terminal	Ferry connection to Les Escoumins
Rimouski-Neigette	Rimouski	711.2	441.9			A-20 east – Rimouski, Mont-Joli	At-grade; A-20 western terminus (Rimouski section)
Rimouski-Neigette	Rimouski	725.0	450.5			R-232 west (Boulevard de la Rivière) – Sainte-Blandine	
Rimouski-Neigette	Rimouski	728.9	452.9			Avenue du Havre – Rimouski ferry terminal	Ferry connections to Forestville and Sept-Îles
La Mitis	Sainte-Luce	743.0	461.7			R-298 east to A-20 / Côte de l'Anse – Sainte-Luce-sur-Mer, Luceville	
La Mitis	Sainte-Flavie	756.1	469.8			R-132 east to A-20 west – Mont-Joli, Amqui, Nouveau-Brunswick, Percé	Beginning of Gaspé Peninsula circular route; to A-20 eastern terminus (Rimouski section)
La Mitis	Grand-Métis	765.6	475.7			R-234 west – Price, Saint-Octave-de-Métis	
La Matanie	Baie-des-Sables	789.3	490.4			R-297 south – Saint-Damase, Saint-Noël	R-297 northern terminus
La Matanie	Matane	815.9	507.0			R-195 – Matane ferry terminal, Amqui	Ferry connections to Baie-Comeau and Godbout
La Haute-Gaspésie	Sainte-Anne-des-Monts	905.1	562.4			R-299 south – Gaspésie National Park, New Richmond	R-299 northern terminus
La Haute-Gaspésie	Saint-Maxime-du-Mont-Louis	972.6	604.3			R-198 east – Murdochville, Gaspé	R-198 western terminus
La Haute-Gaspésie	Gaspé (Rivière-au-Renard)	1,065.4	662.0			R-197 south – Gaspé (Centre-Ville)	R-197 northern terminus; eastbound short-cut to Gaspé townsite
La Haute-Gaspésie	Gaspé	1,088.2– 1,097.5	676.2– 682.0	Passes through Forillon National Park			
La Haute-Gaspésie	Gaspé	1,117.7	694.5			R-197 north – Sainte-Anne-des-Monts	R-197 southern terminus
La Haute-Gaspésie	Gaspé	1,128.5	701.2			R-198 west (Montée de Wakeham) / Rue Adams – Murdochville	West end of R-198 concurrency
La Haute-Gaspésie	Gaspé	1,129.0	701.5			R-198 east – Percé, Chandler	East end of R-198 concurrency
La Haute-Gaspésie	Gaspé	1,143.1	710.3			R-198 west – Gaspé (Centre-Ville)	R-198 eastern terminus; westbound short-cut to Gaspé townsite
Le Rocher-Percé	Percé	1,204.0	748.1				Eastern extent of Gaspé Peninsula circular route; directional signage changes from east-west to west-east
Le Rocher-Percé	Chandler	1,247.8	775.3				
Bonaventure	New Richmond	1,371.1	852.0			R-299 north – Cascapédia-Saint-Jules, Gaspésie National Park	R-299 southern terminus
Avignon	Pointe-à-la-Croix	1,446.5	898.8			Boulevard Inter-Provincial – Pointe-à-la-Croix, Nouveau-Brunswick	To J. C. Van Horne Bridge and Campbellton
Avignon	Matapédia	1,465.1	910.4			Route 11 south – Nouveau-Brunswick	To Matapédia Bridge and Campbellton
La Matapédia	Amqui	1,542.4	958.4			R-195 north (Avenue Gaétan-Archambault) / Rue Desbiens – Matane	East end of R-195 concurrency
La Matapédia	Amqui	1,542.9	958.7			R-195 south (Avenue du Parc) / Rue du Pont – Saint-Léon-le-Grand, Saint-Zénon-du-Lac-Humqui	West end of R-195 concurrency
La Matapédia	Saint-Moïse	1,581.2	982.5			R-297 north – Saint-Noël, Padoue	R-297 southern terminus
La Mitis	Sainte-Angèle-de-Mérici	1,600.4	994.4			R-234 west – Saint-Gabriel-de-Rimouski	East end of R-234 concurrency
La Mitis	Sainte-Angèle-de-Mérici	1,604.5	997.0			R-234 east – Price, Saint-Octave-de-Métis	West end of R-234 concurrency
La Mitis	Mont-Joli	1,612.7	1,002.1			A-20 west / Boulevard Jacques-Cartier – Rimouski	Roundabout; A-20 exit 641; A-20 eastern terminus (Rimouski section)
La Mitis	Sainte-Flavie	1,615.3	1,003.7			R-132 – Rimouski, Matane, Percé	End of Gaspé Peninsula circular route; R-132 km-756; R-132 eastern terminus
1.000 mi = 1.609 km; 1.000 km = 0.621 mi: Concurrency terminus; Incomplete access; Route transition

== See also ==
- List of Quebec provincial highways
- Heritage Highway
- Route 132, a 2010 crime film set on Route 132

Preceded by NY 37	Route 132; Quebec	Succeeded by Route 11
