= Melocheville Tunnel =

Road tunnel in Quebec, Canada

Coordinates: 45.314°N 73.9205°W

The Melocheville Tunnel is a tunnel connecting Beauharnois and Melocheville in Quebec, Canada. It is a segment of Route 132 located near the Beauharnois generating station. The tunnel measures 227.6 m (747 ft) m. Until 1991, it was called the Beauharnois Tunnel.

== History ==
=== Construction ===
The construction of the tunnel was carried out as part of the construction of the Beauharnois Canal, between 1956 and 1957.

The tunnel consists of 18 caissons, placed directly on the rock, one lane in each direction, one sidewalk on the north side and three ventilation shafts, one of which is used for the air outlet and two others for the air inlet.

The tunnel passes under the Beauharnois Canal in Melocheville and is an integral part of the St. Lawrence Seaway.

=== Improvements ===
In 1968, work was carried out for tunnel rehabilitation and resurfacing.

Since then, maintenance work such as road repairs, repair of tunnel walls and rehabilitation of approaches have been carried out to ensure a safe and efficient passage for users and preserve the integrity of the structure.

== Circulation ==
In the tunnel, the two traffic directions are separated by a central support structure forming the first ventilation shaft (air outlet). The tunnel also has a sidewalk on the north side. Nearly 1.7 million passages are made in this tunnel each year.

== Administration ==
Since October 1, 1998, the operation, maintenance and administration of the tunnel belong to Jacques Cartier and Champlain Bridges Incorporated (JCCBI). The structure was previously under the authority of the St. Lawrence Seaway Authority.
