= Dundee, Quebec =

Dundee
- Township municipality
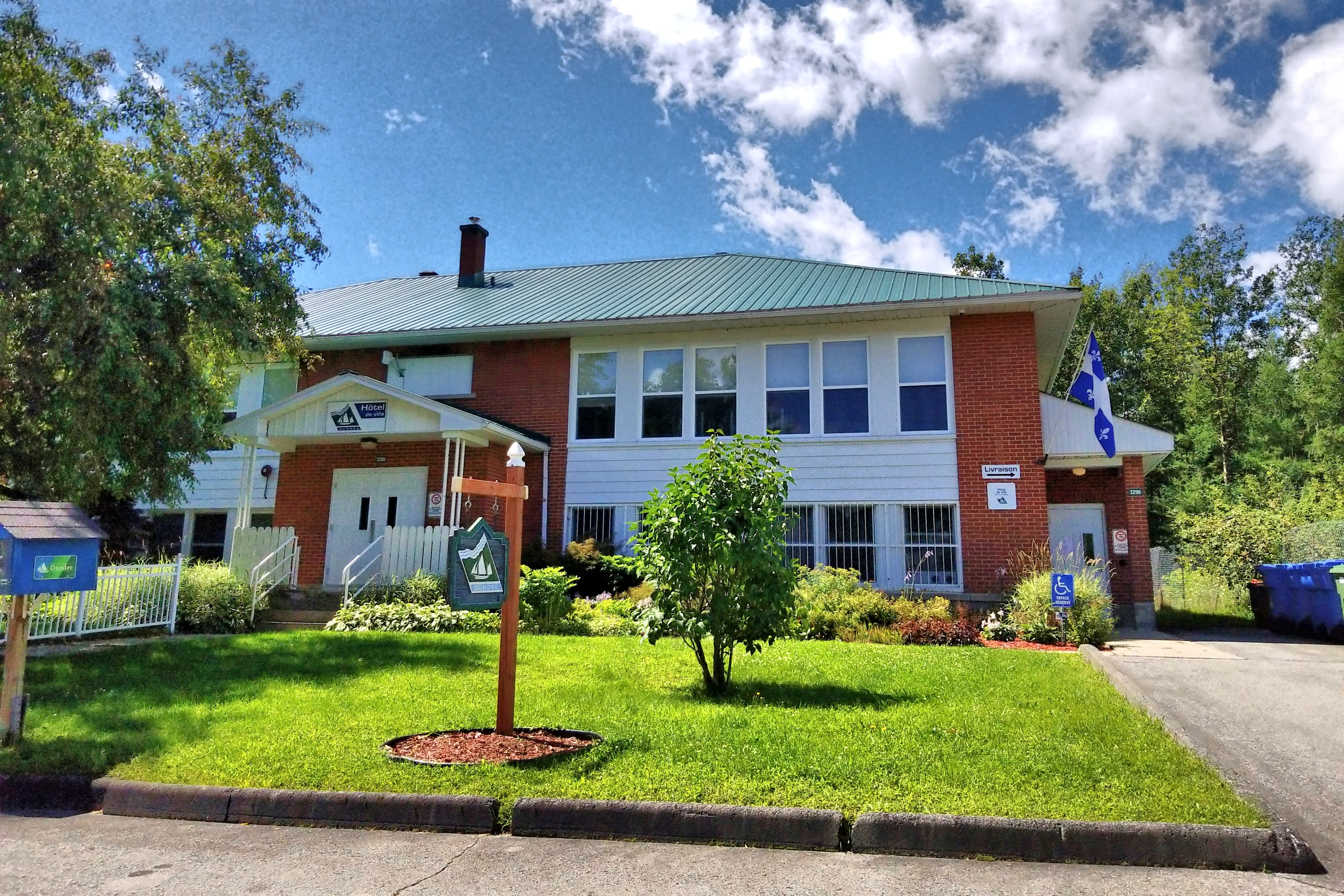
- Dundee town hall

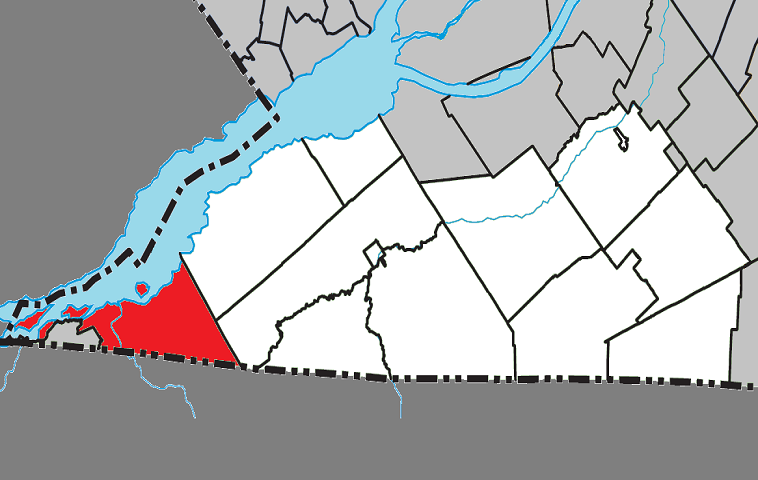
- Location within Le Haut-Saint-Laurent RCM

- Location in southern Quebec
- Coordinates: 45°00′N 074°30′W
- Country: Canada
- Province: Quebec
- Region: Montérégie
- RCM: Le Haut-Saint-Laurent
- Constituted: July 1, 1855
- Named after: Dundee

Government
  - Mayor: Linda Gagnon
  - Federal riding: Salaberry—Suroît
  - Prov. riding: Huntingdon

Area
  - Total: 84.07 km^{2} (32.46 sq mi)
  - Land: 68.41 km^{2} (26.41 sq mi)

Population (2021)
  - Total: 386
  - Density: 5.6/km^{2} (15/sq mi)
  - Pop (2016-21): ▼0.3%
  - Dwellings: 310
- Time zone: UTC−5 (EST)
  - Summer (DST): UTC−4 (EDT)
- Postal code(s): J0S 1L0
- Area codes: 450 and 579
- Highways: R-132
- Website: www.cantondundee.ca

Dundee is a township municipality in Le Haut-Saint-Laurent Regional County Municipality in the Montérégie administrative region of Quebec, Canada. At the 2021 Canadian census, the population was 386. It is primarily an agricultural area consisting of dairy and grain farms.

== Geography ==
Dundee is located in the southwestern corner of the Montérégie region of Quebec. The township is bordered on the south by the Canada–United States border, on the north-west by the Saint Lawrence River, and the Mohawk reserve of Akwesasne to the west. The Salmon River runs through the municipality in a northwesterly direction from the US border to the Saint Lawrence, where many islands also make up Dundee's total area.

=== Communities ===
In addition to the namesake community along the Salmon River at the United States border, the following locations reside within the municipality's boundaries:

- Dundee Centre (45°01′44″N 74°25′37″W) – a hamlet in the centre of the township
- L'Île-Saint-Régis (45°01′08″N 74°38′09″W) – a hamlet located on an island of the same name in the Saint Lawrence River
- Pointe-Fraser (45°02′46″N 74°27′58″W) – a vacation cottage community on the Saint Lawrence River
- Pointe-Leblanc (45°04′23″N 74°26′18″W) – a vacation cottage community on the Saint Lawrence River
- Sainte-Agnès-de-Dundee (45°00′34″N 74°24′04″W) – a village in the southern area of the township
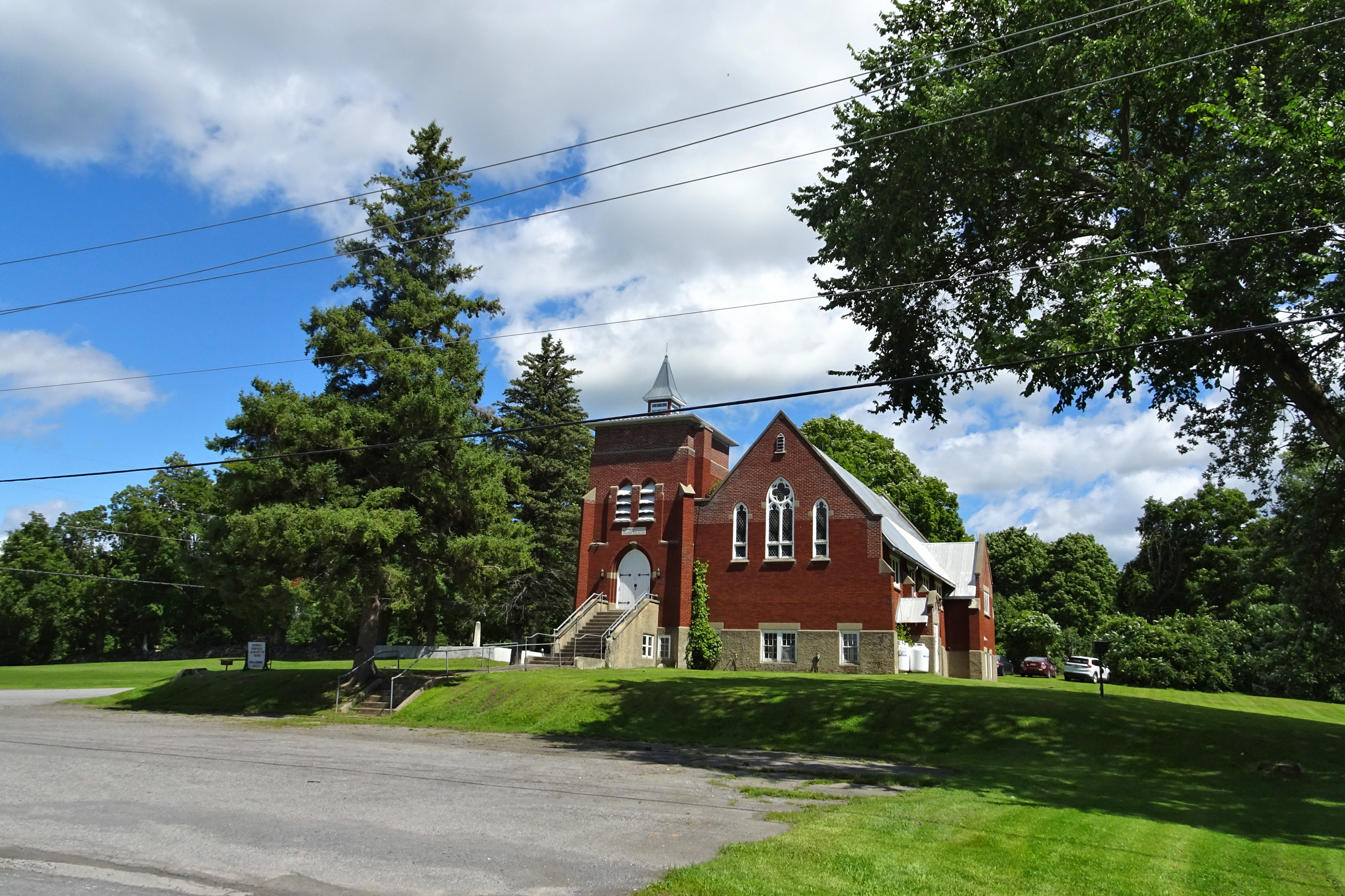
Dundee Centre

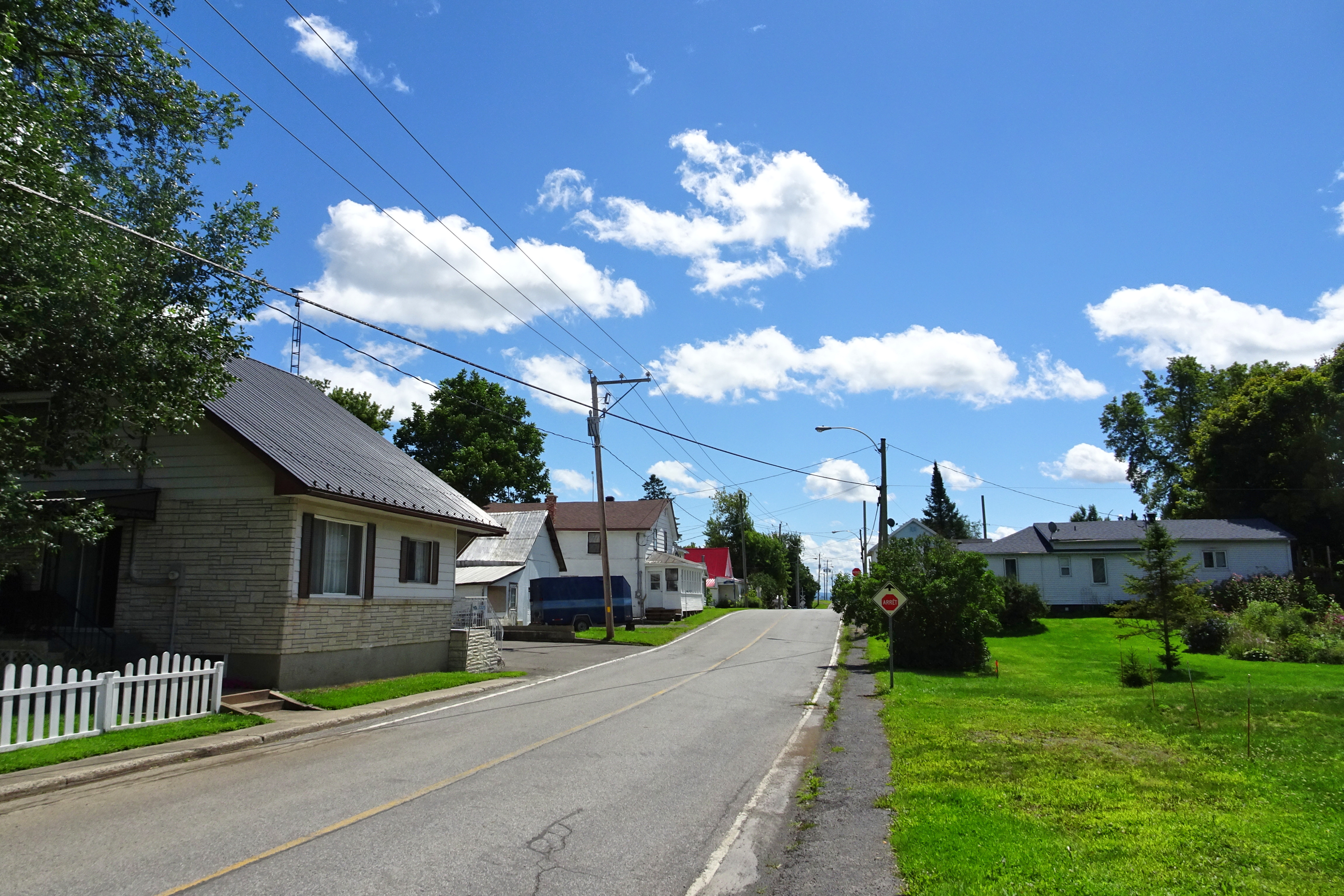
Ste-Agnes-de-Dundee

=== Lakes and rivers ===
The following waterways pass through or are situated within the municipality's boundaries:

- Rivière aux Saumons (45°02′09″N 74°31′25″W) – runs from the US border to the Saint Lawrence River in the municipality's western area.

== History ==
John Davidson, considered the founder of the municipality, was an early settler along the Salmon River (Rivière aux Saumons). He was originally from Dundee, Scotland, and served as postmaster of the new settlement.

On July 1, 1845, the Municipality of Dundee was formed, but merged into the Municipality of Beauharnois Number Two on September 1, 1847 (along with Hinchinbrooke, Hemmingford, Godmanchester, St. Anicet, Russeltown, and Ormstown). It was reestablished on July 1, 1855. On March 15, 1969, it changed statutes and became a township municipality.

== Demographics ==
In the 2021 Census of Population conducted by Statistics Canada, Dundee had a population of 386 living in 168 of its 310 total private dwellings, a change of −0.3% from its 2016 population of 387. With a land area of 68.41 km^{2} (26.41 sq mi), it had a population density of 5.6/km^{2} (14.6/sq mi) in 2021.

Canada census – Dundee community profile

	2021	2016	2011
Population	386 (-0.3% from 2016)	387 (-5.1% from 2011)	408 (-6.4% from 2006)
Land area	68.41 km^{2} (26.41 sq mi)	69.45 km^{2} (26.81 sq mi)	69.76 km^{2} (26.93 sq mi)
Population density	5.6/km^{2} (15/sq mi)	5.6/km^{2} (15/sq mi)	5.8/km^{2} (15/sq mi)
Median age	52.0 (M: 52.4, F: 50.4)	52.0 (M: 53.2, F: 49.5)	47.5 (M: 47.6, F: 47.4)
Private dwellings	310 (total) 168 (occupied)	359 (total) 169 (occupied)	336 (total)
Median household income	$62,000	$51,072	$27,926

References: 2021 2016 2011

Historical Census Data - Dundee, Quebec

Year	Pop.	±%
1921	723	—
1931	630	−12.9%
1941	630	+0.0%
1951	556	−11.7%
1956	549	−1.3%
1961	519	−5.5%

Year	Pop.	±%
1966	487	−6.2%
1971	480	−1.4%
1976	419	−12.7%
1981	386	−7.9%
1986	353	−8.5%
1991	382	+8.2%

Year	Pop.	±%
1996	392	+2.6%
2001	408	+4.1%
2006	436	+6.9%
2011	408	−6.4%
2016	387	−5.1%
2021	386	−0.3%

Source: Statistics Canada

Canada Census Mother Tongue Language - Dundee, Quebec
Census	Total	French			English			French & English			Other		
Year	Responses	Count	Trend	Pop %	Count	Trend	Pop %	Count	Trend	Pop %	Count	Trend	Pop %
2016	390	245	▼3.9%	62.82%	115	▼11.5%	29.49%	10	0.0%	2.56%	15	0.0%	3.85%
2011	410	255	▲2.0%	62.20%	130	▼16.1%	31.70%	10	▲ n/a%	2.44%	15	▼40.0%	3.66%
2006	430	250	▲25.0%	58.14%	155	▼13.9%	36.05%	0	▼100.0%	0.00%	25	0.0%	5.81%
2001	415	200	▼9.1%	48.19%	180	▲33.3%	43.37%	10	0.0%	2.41%	25	▼28.6%	6.02%
1996	400	220	n/a	55.00%	135	n/a	33.75%	10	n/a	2.50%	35	n/a	8.75%

== Attractions ==
Lake Saint-François National Wildlife Area is a National Wildlife Area on the shores of Lake Saint Francis in Dundee. This noncontiguous 1,317 hectares (3,250 acres) site protects a wetland environment with large biodiversity, home to more than 287 animal species and 547 plant species, many of which are at risk. It is also designated as a Ramsar site and an Important Bird Area (IBA).

== Notable people ==
- Sheila Fraser - Auditor General of Canada from 2001 to 2011

== See also ==
- List of anglophone communities in Quebec
- List of township municipalities in Quebec
