= Quebec Route 197 =

Highway in Quebec, Canada

Route 197

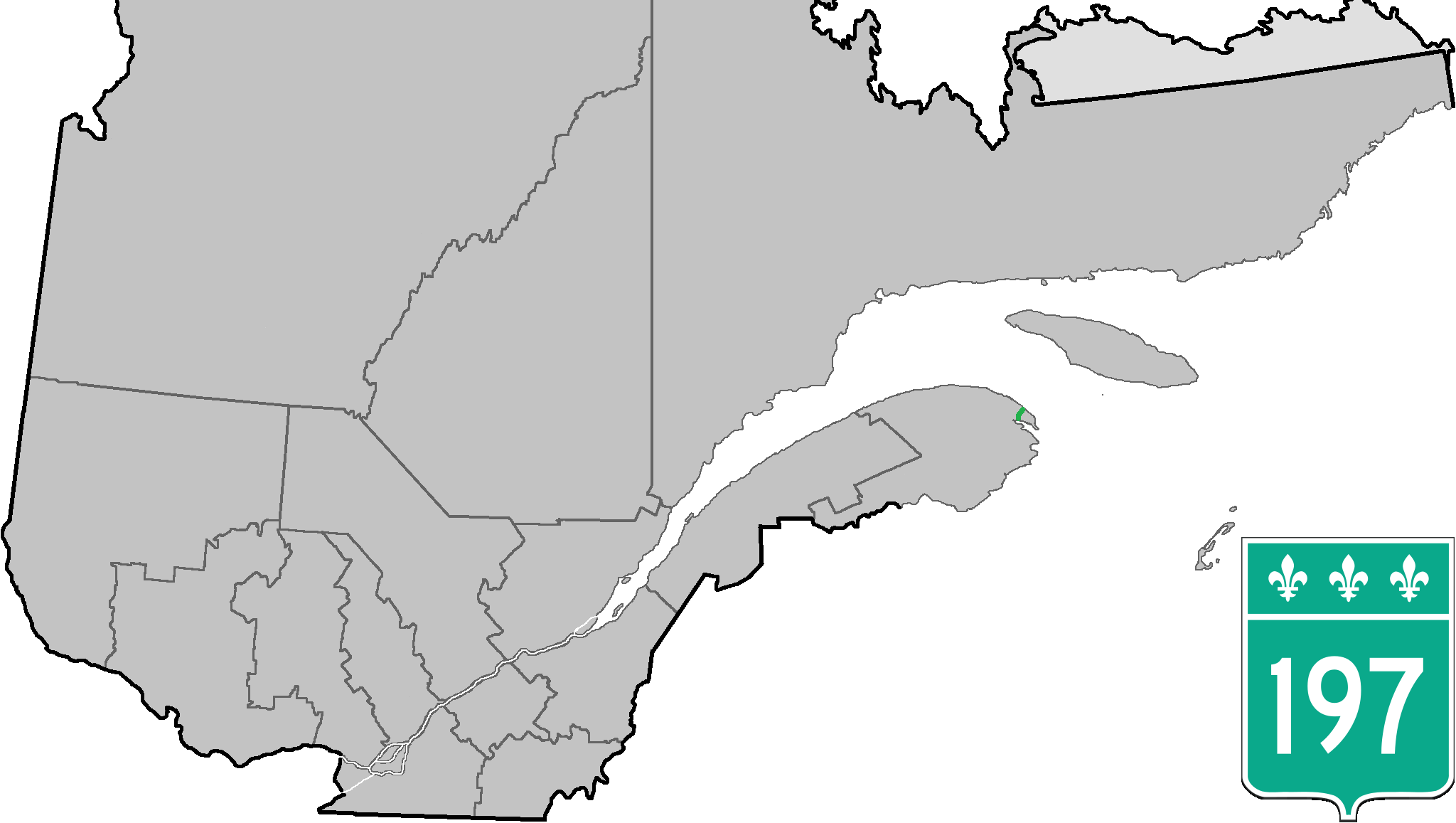

Route information
- Maintained by Transports Québec
- Length: 18.5 km (11.5 mi)
- History: Route 6A

Major junctions
- South end: R-132 in Gaspé
- North end: R-132 in Gaspé

Location
- Country: Canada
- Province: Quebec

Highway system
- Quebec provincial highways; Autoroutes; List; Former
← R-195	→ R-198

Route 197 is a short 19 km two-lane highway which cuts through the Appalachian Mountains in the municipality of Gaspé, Quebec, Canada. Its only function is to act as a shortcut to Route 132 which goes around the Forillon peninsula which makes up Forillon National Park. It starts at the junction of Route 132 in Rivière-au-Renard (part of the municipality of Gaspé) and ends again at the junction of Route 132 in Saint-Majorique, part of Gaspé as well.

== Municipalities along Route 197 ==
- Gaspé - (Rivière-au-Renard / Rivière-Morris / Saint-Majorique )

== Major intersections ==
The entire route is in Gaspé, La Côte-de-Gaspé RCM.

km	mi	Destinations	Notes
0.0	0.0	R-132 – Gaspé	Southern terminus
18.5	11.5	R-132 – Grande-Vallée, Sainte-Anne-des-Monts, Gaspé	Northern terminus
1.000 mi = 1.609 km; 1.000 km = 0.621 mi

== See also ==
- List of Quebec provincial highways
