= Collines-du-Basque =

- Unorganized territory
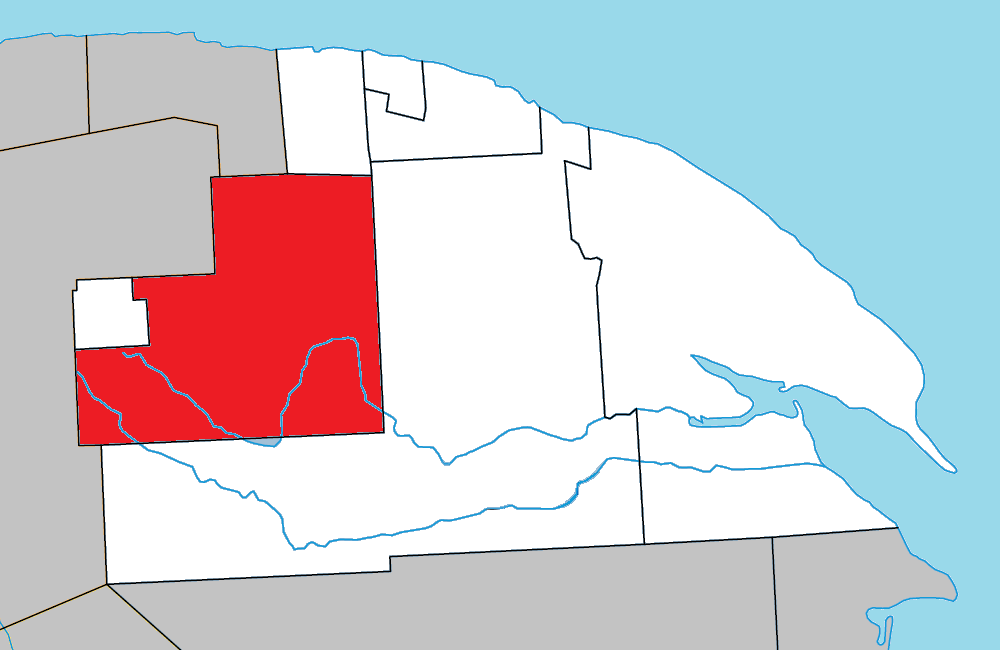
- Location within La Côte-de-Gaspé RCM

- Location in eastern Quebec
- Coordinates: 48°55′N 65°09′W
- Country: Canada
- Province: Quebec
- Region: Gaspésie–Îles-de-la-Madeleine
- RCM: La Côte-de-Gaspé
- Constituted: January 1, 1986

Government
  - Federal riding: Gaspésie—Les Îles-de-la-Madeleine—Listuguj
  - Prov. riding: Gaspé

Area
  - Total: 824.01 km^{2} (318.15 sq mi)
  - Land: 817.84 km^{2} (315.77 sq mi)

Population (2021)
  - Total: 0
  - Density: 0/km^{2} (0/sq mi)
  - Pop (2016-21): 0.0%
  - Dwellings: 0
- Time zone: UTC−05:00 (EST)
  - Summer (DST): UTC−04:00 (EDT)
- Highways: R-198

Collines-du-Basque (French pronunciation: [kɔlin dy bask]) is an unorganized territory in the Gaspésie–Îles-de-la-Madeleine region of Quebec, Canada.

Its French name means Basque Hills, taken from the 421 metres (1,381 ft) high namesake peak along Quebec Route 198 and the York River. The territory is also home to Bolduc Mountain (Mont La Bolduc), rising to 460 metres (1,510 ft), and King Mountain, with an altitude of 660 metres (2,170 ft).

== Demographics ==
Historical Census Data - Collines-du-Basque, Quebec
Year	Pop.	±%
1991	0	—
1996	0	0.00%
2001	0	0.00%
2006	0	0.00%
2011	0	0.00%
2016	0	0.00%
2021	0	0.00%
Source: Statistics Canada

== See also ==
- List of unorganized territories in Quebec
