= Mont-Albert, Quebec =

Mont-Albert
- Unorganized territory
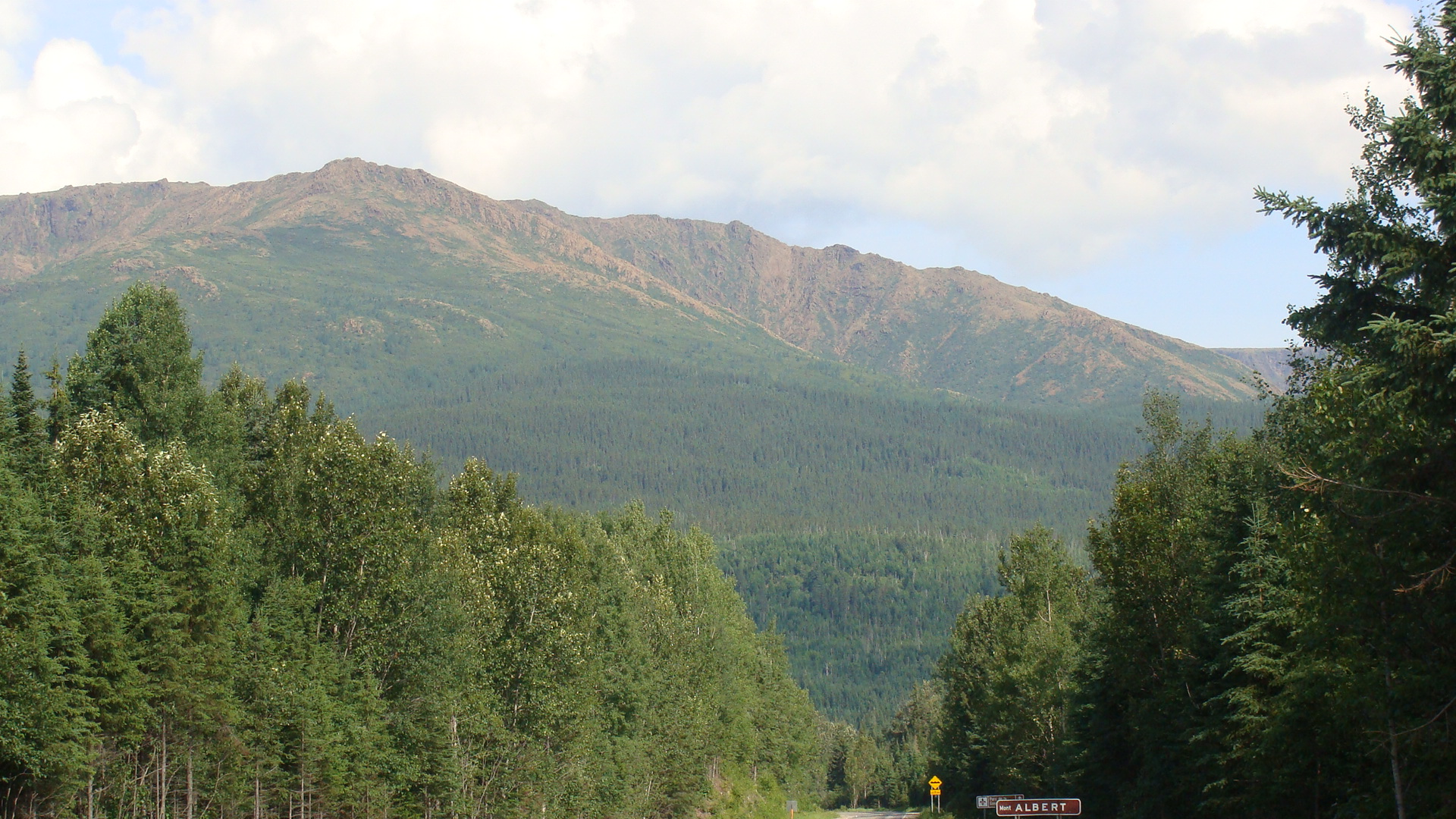
- Mont Albert

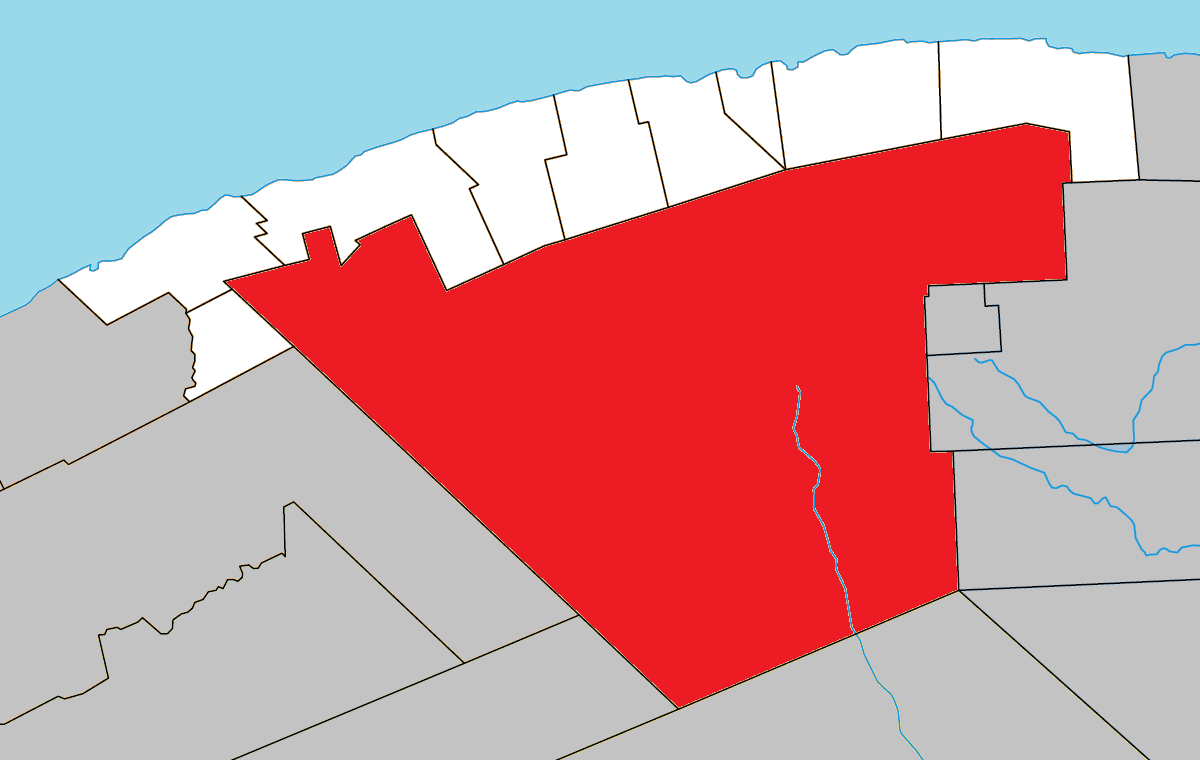
- Location within La Haute-Gaspésie RCM

- Location in eastern Quebec
- Coordinates: 48°55′N 66°11′W
- Country: Canada
- Province: Quebec
- Region: Gaspésie–Îles-de-la-Madeleine
- RCM: La Haute-Gaspésie
- Constituted: January 1, 1986

Government
  - Federal riding: Gaspésie—Les Îles-de-la-Madeleine—Listuguj
  - Prov. riding: Gaspé

Area
  - Total: 3,490.05 km^{2} (1,347.52 sq mi)
  - Land: 3,463.19 km^{2} (1,337.15 sq mi)

Population (2021)
  - Total: 167
  - Density: 0/km^{2} (0/sq mi)
  - Pop (2016-21): ▼6.7%
  - Dwellings: 110
- Time zone: UTC−05:00 (EST)
  - Summer (DST): UTC−04:00 (EDT)
- Postal code(s): G0E 2G0
- Area codes: 418 and 581
- Highways: R-198 R-299

Mont-Albert is an unorganized territory in the Gaspésie–Îles-de-la-Madeleine region of Quebec, Canada.

== Geography ==
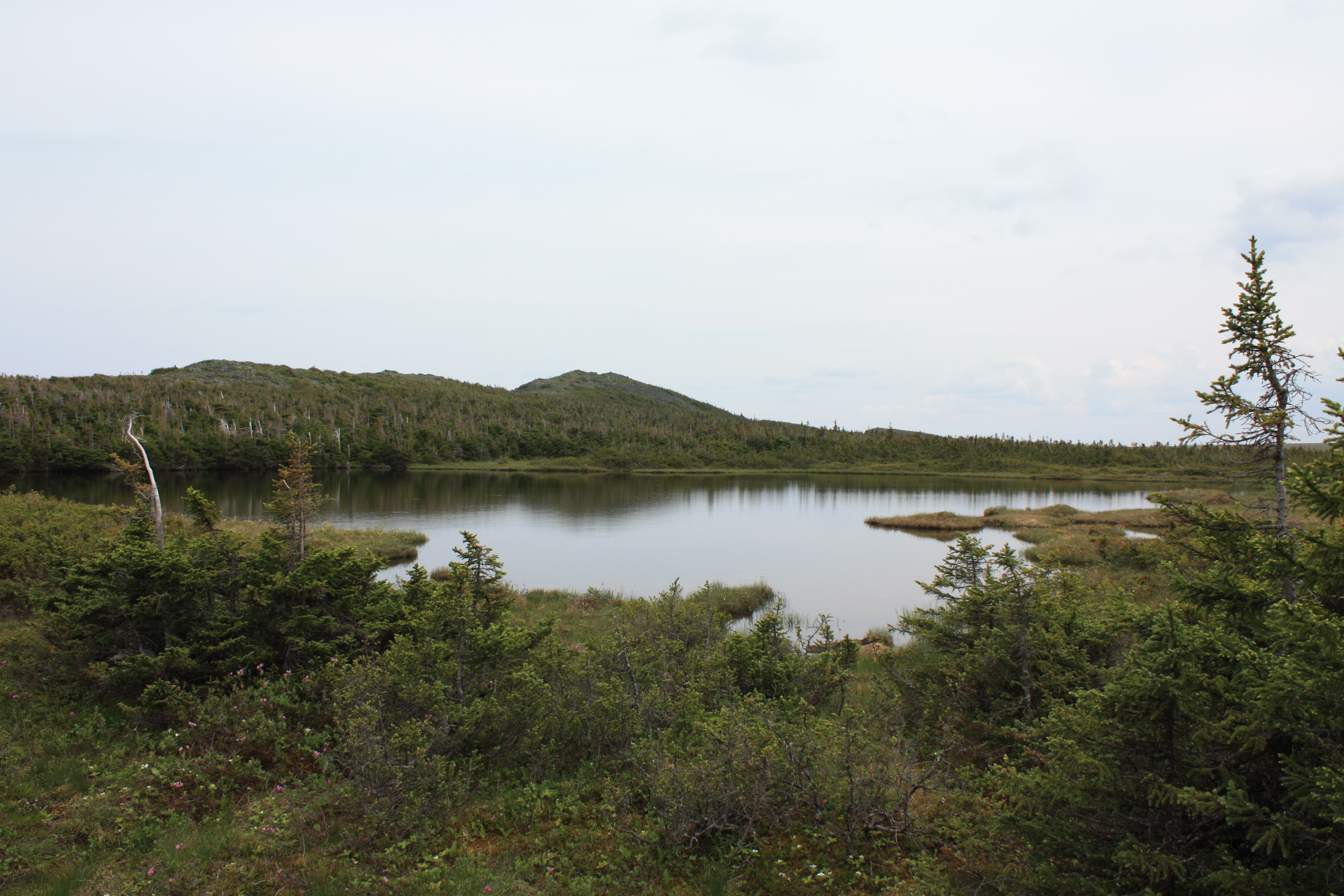
Lake on the plateau at the summit of Mount Albert

The territory is home to the Chic-Chocs Wildlife Reserve and Gaspésie National Park where the eponymous Mount Albert and Mont Jacques-Cartier are located. Mount Albert, with a 1,151-metre-high (3,776 ft) peak, is the 9th highest peak in Quebec. It was named in honour of Prince Albert of Saxe-Coburg and Gotha because geologist Alexander Murray made the first recorded ascent of the mountain on the Prince's birthday, 26 August 1845. Mount Jacques-Cartier, with an altitude of 1,270 metres (4,170 ft), is Quebec's second-highest mountain.

Both mountains are popular with hikers (the International Appalachian Trail traverses them both) and share a unique ecology for its latitude: snow cover for 9 months of the year and alpine tundra vegetation. Furthermore, the territory is also home to migratory woodland caribou, the only remaining herd south of the Saint Lawrence.

=== Communities ===
The only population centre within the territory is Cap-Seize, located 14 kilometres (8.7 mi) south of Sainte-Anne-des-Monts along Quebec Route 299. It was established circa 1940 as a forestry centre and named after the nearby Cap-Seize Creek, a tributary of the Sainte-Anne River. While the name literally means "Cape Sixteen", it is actually a transformation of the English word "capsize", the creek's original name. A post office operated there from 1946 to 1969.

The ghost town of Saint-Octave-de-l'Avenir is about 18 kilometres (11 mi) south-southeast of Cap-Chat, at an altitude of 380 metres (1,250 ft). It was formed in 1932 as part of the Vautrin Settlement Plan to encourage colonization of Gaspésie's interior and intended to bring relief during the Great Depression of the 1930s. The settlement was named after founding priest Louis-Octave Caron (1879–1942) and a hopeful outlook of the future (avenir is French for "future"). It grew to 1200 residents in 1937 but then declined until it was abandoned in 1971. Only summer camps remain.

=== Climate ===
Climate data for Mont-Albert (Cap-Seize), Quebec 225 m (738 ft) (1981–2010 normals, extremes 1967–1994)
Month	Jan	Feb	Mar	Apr	May	Jun	Jul	Aug	Sep	Oct	Nov	Dec	Year
Record high °C (°F)	14.5 (58.1)	11.1 (52.0)	18.3 (64.9)	27.0 (80.6)	29.5 (85.1)	34.0 (93.2)	35.0 (95.0)	31.7 (89.1)	28.0 (82.4)	24.4 (75.9)	19.4 (66.9)	13.0 (55.4)	35.0 (95.0)
Mean daily maximum °C (°F)	−8.4 (16.9)	−6.7 (19.9)	−0.8 (30.6)	6.5 (43.7)	14.2 (57.6)	19.5 (67.1)	22.3 (72.1)	21.3 (70.3)	16.6 (61.9)	8.9 (48.0)	2.5 (36.5)	−4.5 (23.9)	7.6 (45.7)
Daily mean °C (°F)	−13.7 (7.3)	−12.0 (10.4)	−6.4 (20.5)	1.5 (34.7)	8.1 (46.6)	13.4 (56.1)	16.6 (61.9)	15.7 (60.3)	11.2 (52.2)	4.6 (40.3)	−1.3 (29.7)	−9.0 (15.8)	2.4 (36.3)
Mean daily minimum °C (°F)	−19.2 (−2.6)	−17.6 (0.3)	−12.0 (10.4)	−3.8 (25.2)	2.0 (35.6)	7.2 (45.0)	10.9 (51.6)	10.0 (50.0)	5.8 (42.4)	0.2 (32.4)	−5.1 (22.8)	−13.3 (8.1)	−2.9 (26.8)
Record low °C (°F)	−38.0 (−36.4)	−36.0 (−32.8)	−32.0 (−25.6)	−27.0 (−16.6)	−12.5 (9.5)	−6.7 (19.9)	1.0 (33.8)	−1.5 (29.3)	−6.7 (19.9)	−12.2 (10.0)	−23.0 (−9.4)	−32.2 (−26.0)	−38.0 (−36.4)
Average precipitation mm (inches)	101.0 (3.98)	78.1 (3.07)	92.2 (3.63)	74.1 (2.92)	69.1 (2.72)	84.8 (3.34)	102.9 (4.05)	108.6 (4.28)	100.2 (3.94)	94.4 (3.72)	106.2 (4.18)	124.8 (4.91)	1,136.4 (44.74)
Average snowfall cm (inches)	88.7 (34.9)	71.8 (28.3)	79.7 (31.4)	38.7 (15.2)	2.9 (1.1)	0.0 (0.0)	0.0 (0.0)	0.0 (0.0)	0.1 (0.0)	13.5 (5.3)	69.0 (27.2)	110.8 (43.6)	475.2 (187)
Average precipitation days (≥ 0.2 mm)	20.0	15.7	13.8	14.0	14.1	15.1	16.2	16.5	17.9	17.4	17.6	21.4	199.7
Average snowy days (≥ 0.2 cm)	19.2	14.9	12.2	6.9	0.8	0.0	0.0	0.0	0.1	3.0	11.9	20.0	89.0
Source 1: Ministère de l’Environnement
Source 2: Environment Canada (extremes & precip/snow)

== Demographics ==
Canada census – Mont-Albert community profile

	2021	2016	2011
Population	167 (-6.7% from 2016)	179 (-12.3% from 2011)	204 (-6.4% from 2006)
Land area	3,463.19 km^{2} (1,337.15 sq mi)	3,470.44 km^{2} (1,339.94 sq mi)	3,470.44 km^{2} (1,339.94 sq mi)
Population density	0.0/km^{2} (0/sq mi)	0.1/km^{2} (0.26/sq mi)	0.1/km^{2} (0.26/sq mi)
Median age	55.2 (M: 57.2, F: 53.6)	50.4 (M: 52.2, F: 48.2)	44.4 (M: 47.6, F: 41.5)
Private dwellings	110 (total) 91 (occupied)	150 (total) 88 (occupied)	87 (total)
Median household income	$.N/A	$49,664	$.N/A

Notes: Income data for this area has been suppressed for data quality or confidentiality reasons.
References: 2021 2016 2011

Historical Census Data - Mont-Albert, Quebec

Year	Pop.	±%
1986	240	—
1991	227	−5.4%
1996	207	−8.8%
2001	222	+7.2%

Year	Pop.	±%
2006	218	−1.8%
2011	204	−6.4%
2016	179	−12.3%
2021	167	−6.7%

Population counts are not adjusted for boundary changes.
Source: Statistics Canada

== Notable people ==
- Thérèse Dion (1927–2020), television personality and the mother of singer Céline Dion

== See also ==
- List of unorganized territories in Quebec
