= Saint-Maxime-du-Mont-Louis =

- Municipality
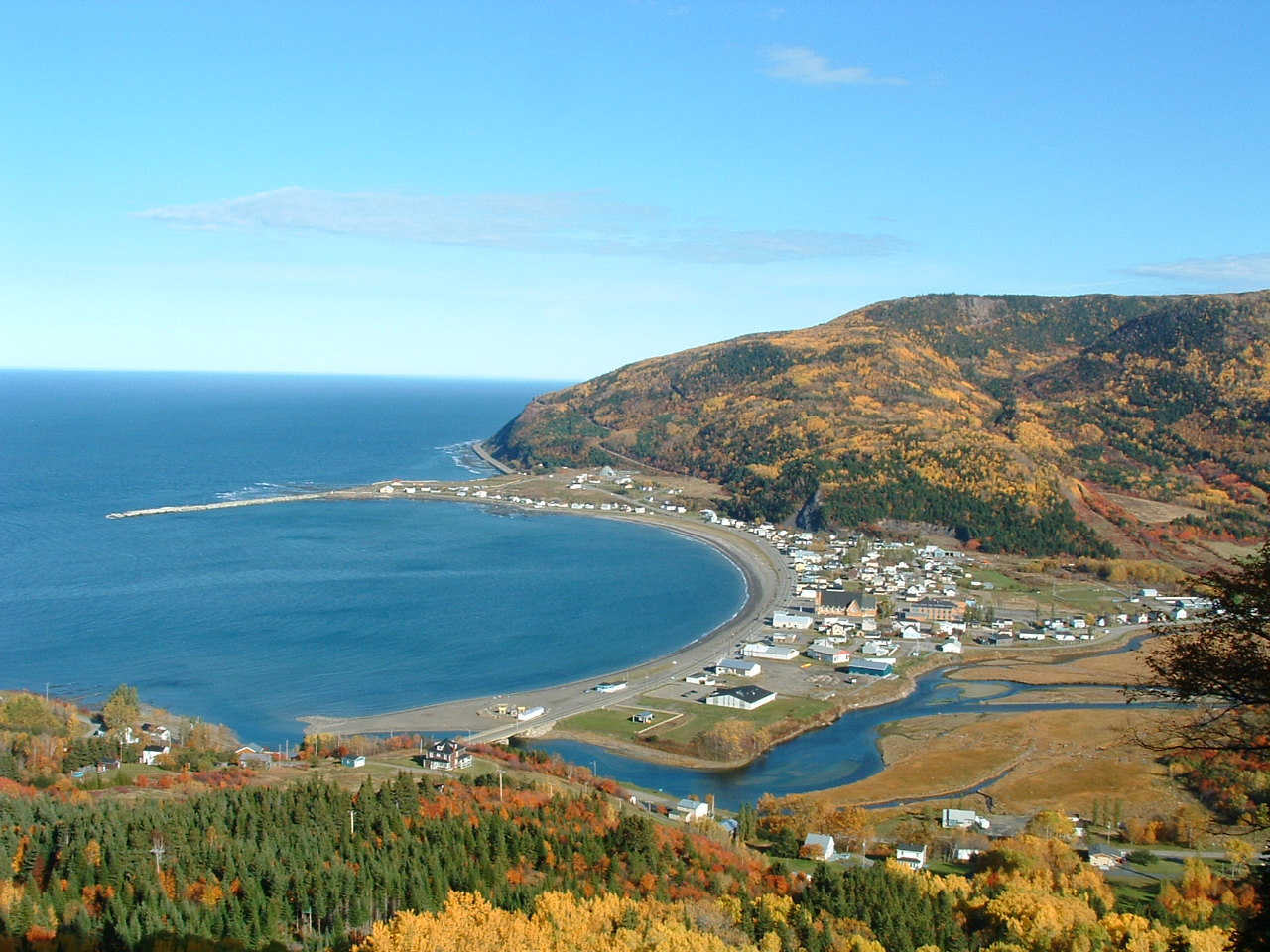

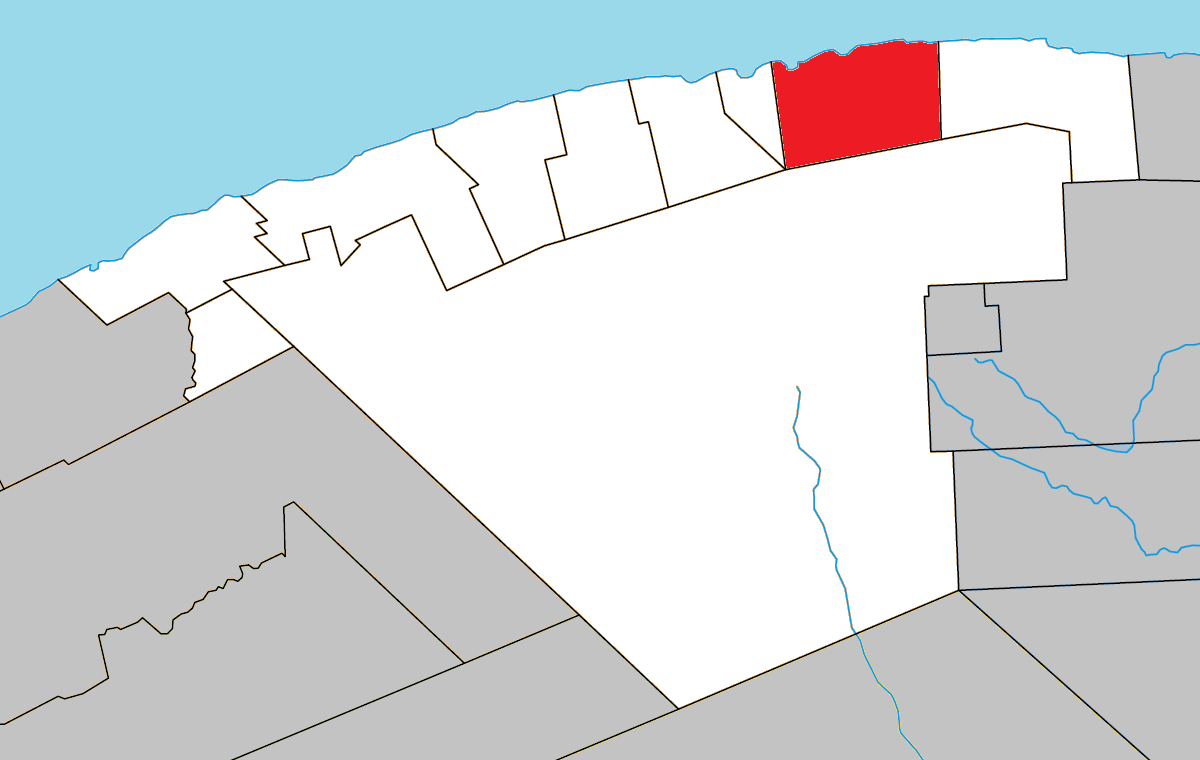
- Location within La Haute-Gaspésie RCM

- Location in eastern Quebec
- Coordinates: 49°14′N 65°44′W
- Country: Canada
- Province: Quebec
- Region: Gaspésie–Îles-de-la-Madeleine
- RCM: La Haute-Gaspésie
- Constituted: June 10, 1884

Government
  - Mayor: Claude Bélanger
  - Federal riding: Gaspésie—Les Îles-de-la-Madeleine—Listuguj
  - Prov. riding: Gaspé

Area
  - Total: 232.33 km^{2} (89.70 sq mi)
  - Land: 232.67 km^{2} (89.83 sq mi)
- There is an apparent contradiction between two authoritative sources.
- Elevation: 15.20 m (49.9 ft)

Population (2021)
  - Total: 1,047
  - Density: 4.5/km^{2} (12/sq mi)
  - Pop (2016-21): ▼7.7%
  - Dwellings: 585
- Time zone: UTC−5 (EST)
  - Summer (DST): UTC−4 (EDT)
- Postal code(s): G0E 1T0
- Area codes: 418 and 581
- Highways: R-132 R-198
- Website: st-maxime.qc.ca

Saint-Maxime-du-Mont-Louis (French pronunciation: [sɛ̃ maksim dy mɔ̃ lwi]) is a municipality in Quebec, Canada. Located in the administrative region of Gaspésie–Îles-de-la-Madeleine and the regional county municipality of La Haute-Gaspésie, the municipality comprises the communities of Mont-Louis, Ruisseau-des-Olives, L'Anse-Pleureuse, Les Côtes-du-Portage and Gros-Morne.

The municipality had a population of 1,047 as of the Canada 2021 Census.

The eponymous Mount Louis is one of two prominent hills that line the Bay of Mont-Louis (the other being Mount Saint-Pierre). The 465-metre-high (1,526 ft) hill was named after King Louis XIV of France.

== History ==
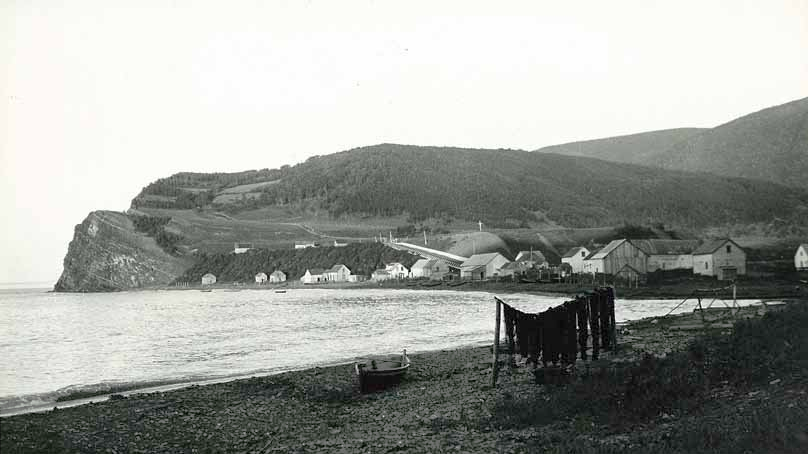
Gros-Morne circa 1930

The place was first inhabited by twelve families in 1697 and fifty-three in 1699, but was abandoned by 1702. Later that century, fishing businesses set up in the Mont-Louis Bay, east of the mouth of the Mont-Louis River. It was considered at that time as the best location on the Saint Lawrence River for cod fishing. In 1758, the post was destroyed by General James Wolfe during his Gulf of St. Lawrence Campaign.

By 1863, Mont-Louis had grown to 200 inhabitants, and four years later, the Parish of Saint-Maxime-du-Mont-Louis was founded, which was named after Maxime Tardif (1821–1850), a secretary to Bishop Pierre-Flavien Turgeon. In 1884, the municipality was established, taking its name from the parish.

In 1947, the municipality lost part of its territory when the Village Municipality of Mont-Saint-Pierre split off.

== Geography ==
=== Climate ===
The locality has a humid continental climate (Dfb) in spite of its marine position with quite cold and snowy winters combined with warm but relatively short summers. Due to its seasonal lag, September is quite some way above the 10 °C (50 °F) threshold for continental above subarctic, but the fifth-warmest month May is some way cooler than that. However, the lag is not as intense as in other eastern Canadian localities, with July being significantly warmer than August.

Climate data for Saint-Maxime-du-Mont-Louis
| Month | Jan | Feb | Mar | Apr | May | Jun | Jul | Aug | Sep | Oct | Nov | Dec | Year |
|---|---|---|---|---|---|---|---|---|---|---|---|---|---|
| Record high °C (°F) | 12 (54) | 15.6 (60.1) | 20 (68) | 30 (86) | 31 (88) | 36.7 (98.1) | 34.5 (94.1) | 35.6 (96.1) | 32.2 (90.0) | 26.7 (80.1) | 21.7 (71.1) | 17.8 (64.0) | 36.7 (98.1) |
| Mean daily maximum °C (°F) | −7.2 (19.0) | −6.1 (21.0) | −0.2 (31.6) | 5.7 (42.3) | 12.8 (55.0) | 19.1 (66.4) | 22.1 (71.8) | 20.9 (69.6) | 15.8 (60.4) | 9.3 (48.7) | 3 (37) | −3.6 (25.5) | 7.6 (45.7) |
| Daily mean °C (°F) | −11.7 (10.9) | −10.6 (12.9) | −4.7 (23.5) | 1.8 (35.2) | 8.1 (46.6) | 14 (57) | 17.3 (63.1) | 16.3 (61.3) | 11.4 (52.5) | 5.5 (41.9) | −0.3 (31.5) | −7.4 (18.7) | 3.3 (37.9) |
| Mean daily minimum °C (°F) | −16.1 (3.0) | −15.1 (4.8) | −9.1 (15.6) | −2.1 (28.2) | 3.3 (37.9) | 8.9 (48.0) | 12.5 (54.5) | 11.7 (53.1) | 7 (45) | 1.7 (35.1) | −3.5 (25.7) | −11.2 (11.8) | −1 (30) |
| Record low °C (°F) | −35 (−31) | −30 (−22) | −25.6 (−14.1) | −17 (1) | −10 (14) | −1.1 (30.0) | 1.1 (34.0) | 1.7 (35.1) | −3.3 (26.1) | −9.4 (15.1) | −20 (−4) | −27.8 (−18.0) | −35 (−31) |
| Average precipitation mm (inches) | 64.1 (2.52) | 47.6 (1.87) | 64.8 (2.55) | 62.1 (2.44) | 66.7 (2.63) | 76 (3.0) | 84.7 (3.33) | 91.6 (3.61) | 83.5 (3.29) | 94.1 (3.70) | 70 (2.8) | 79.8 (3.14) | 885 (34.8) |
| Average rainfall mm (inches) | 4.3 (0.17) | 1.8 (0.07) | 12.4 (0.49) | 35.9 (1.41) | 64.2 (2.53) | 76 (3.0) | 84.7 (3.33) | 91.6 (3.61) | 83.5 (3.29) | 91.6 (3.61) | 37.4 (1.47) | 13.3 (0.52) | 596.5 (23.48) |
| Average snowfall cm (inches) | 59.9 (23.6) | 45.9 (18.1) | 52.3 (20.6) | 26.2 (10.3) | 2.5 (1.0) | 0 (0) | 0 (0) | 0 (0) | 0 (0) | 2.5 (1.0) | 32.6 (12.8) | 66.6 (26.2) | 288.5 (113.6) |
Source: Environment Canada

== Demographics ==
In the 2021 Census of Population conducted by Statistics Canada, Saint-Maxime-du-Mont-Louis had a population of 1,047 living in 501 of its 585 total private dwellings, a change of −7.7% from its 2016 population of 1,134. With a land area of 232.67 km^{2} (89.83 sq mi), it had a population density of 4.5/km^{2} (11.7/sq mi) in 2021.

Canada census – Saint-Maxime-du-Mont-Louis community profile

| | 2021 | 2016 | 2011 |
| Population | 1,047 (-7.7% from 2016) | 1,134 (+1.4% from 2011) | 1,118 (-6.4% from 2006) |
| Land area | 232.67 km^{2} (89.83 sq mi) | 233.63 km^{2} (90.21 sq mi) | 231.60 km^{2} (89.42 sq mi) |
| Population density | 4.5/km^{2} (12/sq mi) | 4.9/km^{2} (13/sq mi) | 4.8/km^{2} (12/sq mi) |
| Median age | 56.8 (M: 56.8, F: 57.2) | 53.4 (M: 52.3, F: 54.8) | 50.8 (M: 50.7, F: 51.1) |
| Private dwellings | 585 (total) 501 (occupied) | 620 (total) 496 (occupied) | 598 (total) |
| Median household income | $53,200 | $44,800 | $42,137 |

References: 2021 2016 2011

Historical Census Data - Saint-Maxime-du-Mont-Louis, Quebec

| Year | Pop. | ±% |
|---|---|---|
| 1891 | 896 | — |
| 1901 | 895 | −0.1% |
| 1911 | 989 | +10.5% |
| 1921 | 1,218 | +23.2% |
| 1931 | 1,474 | +21.0% |
| 1941 | 1,744 | +18.3% |
| 1951 | 1,533 | −12.1% |

| Year | Pop. | ±% |
|---|---|---|
| 1956 | 1,909 | +24.5% |
| 1961 | 2,032 | +6.4% |
| 1966 | 1,802 | −11.3% |
| 1971 | 1,764 | −2.1% |
| 1976 | 1,710 | −3.1% |
| 1981 | 1,797 | +5.1% |
| 1986 | 1,694 | −5.7% |

| Year | Pop. | ±% |
|---|---|---|
| 1991 | 1,582 | −6.6% |
| 1996 | 1,499 | −5.2% |
| 2001 | 1,288 | −14.1% |
| 2006 | 1,194 | −7.3% |
| 2011 | 1,118 | −6.4% |
| 2016 | 1,134 | +1.4% |
| 2021 | 1,047 | −7.7% |

Source: Statistics Canada

== See also ==
- List of municipalities in Quebec
