= Murdochville =

- City
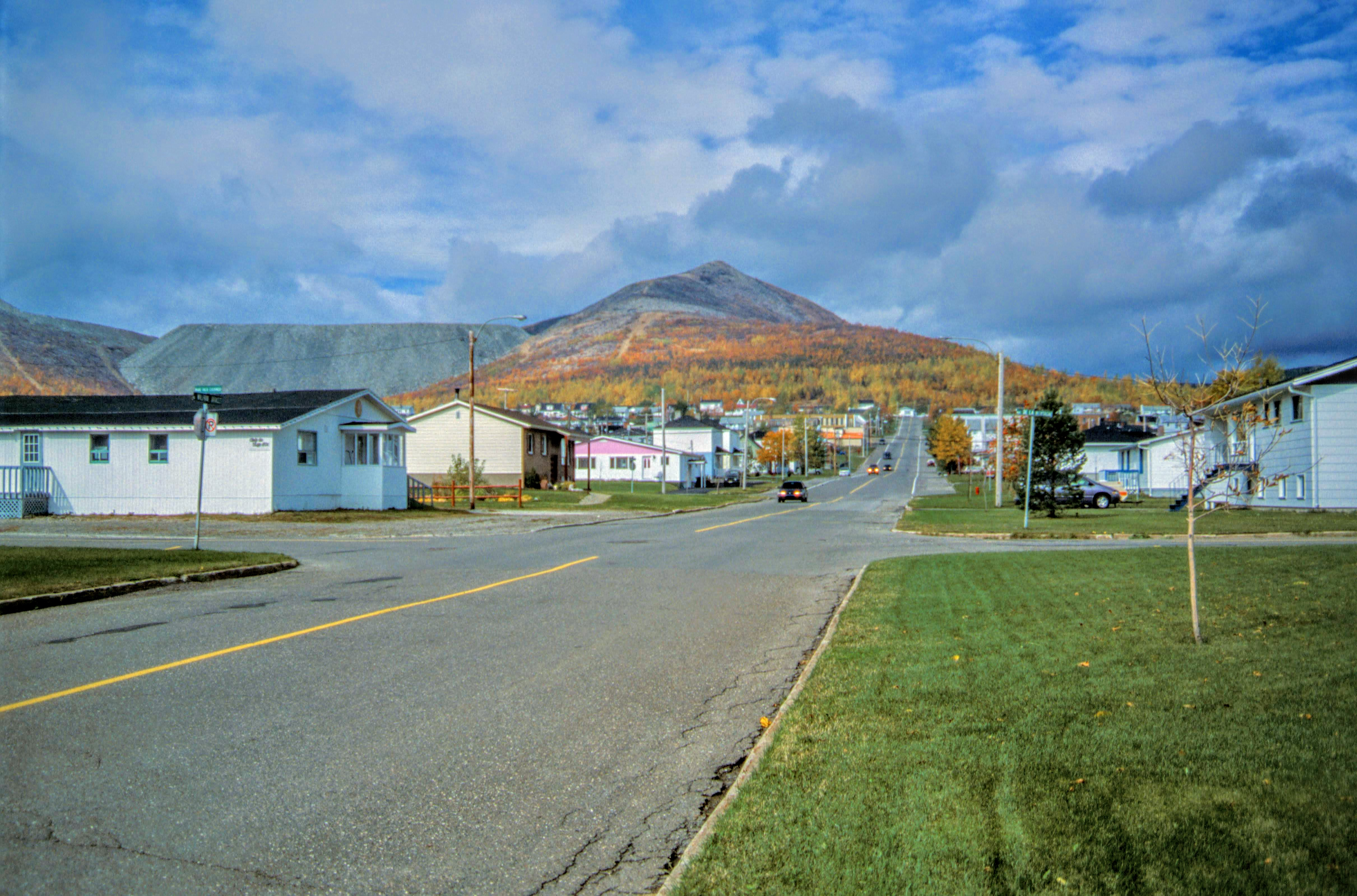

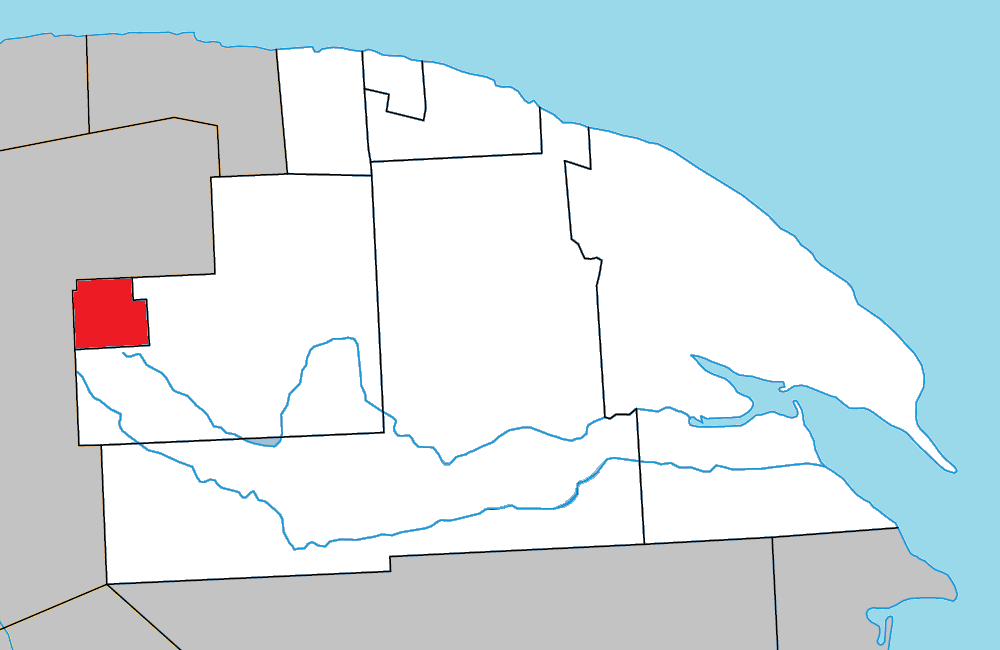
- Location within La Côte-de-Gaspé RCM

- Location in eastern Quebec
- Coordinates: 48°58′N 65°30′W
- Country: Canada
- Province: Quebec
- Region: Gaspésie–Îles-de-la-Madeleine
- RCM: La Côte-de-Gaspé
- Settled: 1950
- Constituted: July 15, 1953

Government
  - Mayor: Délisca Ritchie Roussy
  - Federal riding: Gaspésie—Les Îles-de-la-Madeleine—Listuguj
  - Prov. riding: Gaspé

Area
  - Total: 64.35 km^{2} (24.85 sq mi)
  - Land: 60.84 km^{2} (23.49 sq mi)
- Elevation: 535 m (1,755 ft)

Population (2021)
  - Total: 643
  - Density: 10.6/km^{2} (27/sq mi)
  - Pop (2016-21): ▼1.2%
  - Dwellings: 476
- Time zone: UTC−5 (EST)
  - Summer (DST): UTC−4 (EDT)
- Postal code(s): G0E 1W0
- Area codes: 418 and 581
- Highways: R-198
- Website: www.murdochville.com

Murdochville (French pronunciation: [mɚdɔkvil, mœʁ-]) is a city in Quebec, Canada, one of only a few inland communities on the Gaspé Peninsula. Its population (as of 2021) is 643.

== History ==
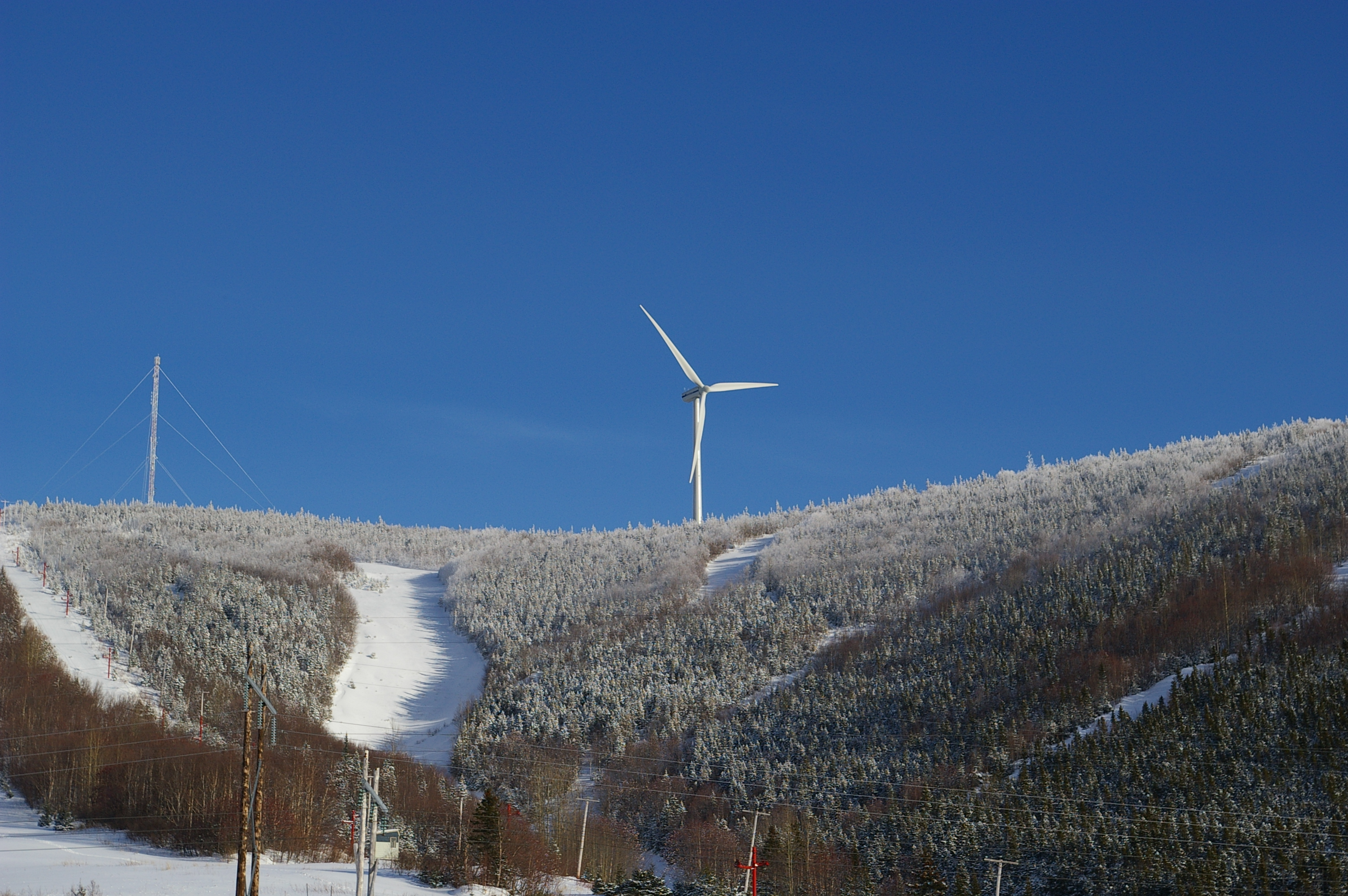
Mont Miller ski area, looking north from Murdochville

In 1921, copper ore was discovered in the area by the Miller brothers: Alfred, Sydney, Frederick, Angus and Theophilus. However, it was not until 1950 that Noranda Mines actually began mining. The mining town was set up and named after James Y. Murdoch, owner of the mine and first president of Noranda. In 1953, the town was incorporated.

The mining operation in the town was comparatively large, starting with mining the raw ore and finishing with an end product of pure copper anode. In the 1970s, the mining operation in Murdochville was large enough to support a population of 5,000 inhabitants. A number of large union battles in Murdochville also helped lay the groundwork for ideas that still exist today. The 1957 Murdochville strike led to the adoption of several new laws protecting the rights of unionized workers in Quebec.

In 1987, the mine was partially destroyed by an underground fire, and mining only resumed two years later.

The mine closed in 1999, leaving the town to fight for survival. After several close calls, the small town has decided to fight back, in an effort to reverse the economic uncertainty that has befallen it. This has included the creation of several large wind turbine projects, along with the diversification of the local economy, with emphasis on tourism (such as skiing in the winter months).

The presence of numerous lakes in the surrounding area remains an important attraction for fishing enthusiasts.

== Geography ==
Murdochville is located along Quebec Route 198 in the geographic township of Holland, 40 kilometres (25 mi) south of L'Anse-Pleureuse and 93 kilometres (58 mi) west of Gaspé. It is 535 metres (1,755 ft) above sea level and surrounded by high mountains.

=== Climate ===
Murdochville has a warm-summer humid continental climate (Dfb). Summers are relatively cool and short, whereas winters are long and at times very cold with massive amounts of snowfall. The brief summers are, however, mild enough to keep September (the fourth-warmest month) right above the 10 °C (50 °F) isotherm for a humid continental climate.

Climate data for Murdochville, Quebec
Month	Jan	Feb	Mar	Apr	May	Jun	Jul	Aug	Sep	Oct	Nov	Dec	Year
Record high °C (°F)	8.5 (47.3)	15.6 (60.1)	16.7 (62.1)	23.5 (74.3)	29.4 (84.9)	33.0 (91.4)	33.5 (92.3)	32.8 (91.0)	28.9 (84.0)	24.0 (75.2)	20.0 (68.0)	10.6 (51.1)	33.5 (92.3)
Mean daily maximum °C (°F)	−9.1 (15.6)	−7.9 (17.8)	−1.7 (28.9)	5.2 (41.4)	12.5 (54.5)	18.2 (64.8)	21.0 (69.8)	20.2 (68.4)	14.3 (57.7)	7.3 (45.1)	0.5 (32.9)	−5.9 (21.4)	6.2 (43.2)
Daily mean °C (°F)	−13.8 (7.2)	−12.7 (9.1)	−6.3 (20.7)	0.8 (33.4)	7.5 (45.5)	13.1 (55.6)	16.2 (61.2)	15.6 (60.1)	10.2 (50.4)	3.9 (39.0)	−2.8 (27.0)	−9.7 (14.5)	1.8 (35.3)
Mean daily minimum °C (°F)	−18.4 (−1.1)	−17.3 (0.9)	−11.0 (12.2)	−3.6 (25.5)	2.4 (36.3)	7.9 (46.2)	11.4 (52.5)	10.9 (51.6)	6.0 (42.8)	0.5 (32.9)	−6.0 (21.2)	−13.5 (7.7)	−2.6 (27.4)
Record low °C (°F)	−36.1 (−33.0)	−36.7 (−34.1)	−29.0 (−20.2)	−22.2 (−8.0)	−12.8 (9.0)	−3.9 (25.0)	1.5 (34.7)	−1.7 (28.9)	−6.1 (21.0)	−15.0 (5.0)	−21.0 (−5.8)	−30.5 (−22.9)	−36.7 (−34.1)
Average precipitation mm (inches)	101 (4.0)	73 (2.9)	102 (4.0)	80 (3.1)	64 (2.5)	87 (3.4)	111 (4.4)	96 (3.8)	79 (3.1)	87 (3.4)	111 (4.4)	127 (5.0)	1,118 (44)
Average snowfall cm (inches)	91.1 (35.9)	68.5 (27.0)	91.4 (36.0)	56.7 (22.3)	10.6 (4.2)	0.3 (0.1)	0.0 (0.0)	0.1 (0.0)	0.5 (0.2)	23.4 (9.2)	77.3 (30.4)	111.5 (43.9)	531.4 (209.2)
Average precipitation days	14.8	12.8	13.9	12.4	12.3	13.7	15.0	13.0	13.5	13.6	17.4	17.2	169.6
Average rainy days	1.3	0.6	1.9	4.7	10.7	13.7	15.0	13.0	13.3	10.0	5.2	2.0	91.4
Average snowy days	14.2	12.5	12.6	8.3	2.2	0.1	0.0	0.0	0.3	4.8	13.2	16.2	84.4

== Demographics ==
In the 2021 Census of Population conducted by Statistics Canada, Murdochville had a population of 643 living in 327 of its 476 total private dwellings, a change of −1.2% from its 2016 population of 651. With a land area of 60.84 km^{2} (23.49 sq mi), it had a population density of 10.6/km^{2} (27.4/sq mi) in 2021.

Canada census – Murdochville community profile

	2021	2016	2011
Population	643 (-1.2% from 2016)	651 (-14.8% from 2011)	764 (-5.9% from 2006)
Land area	60.84 km^{2} (23.49 sq mi)	61.37 km^{2} (23.70 sq mi)	61.18 km^{2} (23.62 sq mi)
Population density	10.6/km^{2} (27/sq mi)	10.6/km^{2} (27/sq mi)	12.5/km^{2} (32/sq mi)
Median age	50.4 (M: 49.2, F: 53.2)	51.8 (M: 50.3, F: 53.5)	48.8 (M: 49.1, F: 48.6)
Private dwellings	476 (total) 327 (occupied)	512 (total)	508 (total)
Median household income	$57,600	$63,127	$33,013

References: 2021 2016 2011

Canada Census Mother Tongue - Murdochville, Quebec
Census	Total	French			English			French & English			Other		
Year	Responses	Count	Trend	Pop %	Count	Trend	Pop %	Count	Trend	Pop %	Count	Trend	Pop %
2021	640	615	▼0.8%	96.1%	15	▼25.0%	2.3%	5	0.0%	0.8%	0	0.0%	0.0%
2016	655	620	▼14.5%	94.7%	20	▼33.3%	3.1%	5	0.0%	0.8%	0	0.0%	0.0%
2011	760	725	0.0%	95.4%	30	0.0%	4.0%	5	▲ n/a%	0.7%	0	▼100.0%	0.0%
2006	805	725	▼34.4%	90.1%	30	▼14.3%	3.7%	0	▼100.0%	0.0%	50	▲400.0%	6.2%
2001	1,175	1,105	▼25.6%	94.0%	35	▼65.0%	3.0%	25	▲150.0%	2.1%	10	▲ n/a%	0.9%
1996	1,595	1,485	n/a	93.1%	100	n/a	6.3%	10	n/a	0.6%	0	n/a	0.0%

Historical Census Data - Murdochville, Quebec

Year	Pop.	±%
1956	1,694	—
1961	2,951	+74.2%
1966	3,028	+2.6%
1971	2,891	−4.5%
1976	3,704	+28.1%
1981	3,396	−8.3%
1986	2,302	−32.2%

Year	Pop.	±%
1991	1,689	−26.6%
1996	1,595	−5.6%
2001	1,171	−26.6%
2006	812	−30.7%
2011	764	−5.9%
2016	651	−14.8%
2021	643	−1.2%

Population counts are not adjusted for boundary changes.
Source: Statistics Canada

== See also ==
- List of cities in Quebec
