= Quebec Route 198 =

Highway in Quebec, Canada

Coordinates: 48°51′39.2″N 65°5′10.2″W

Route 198

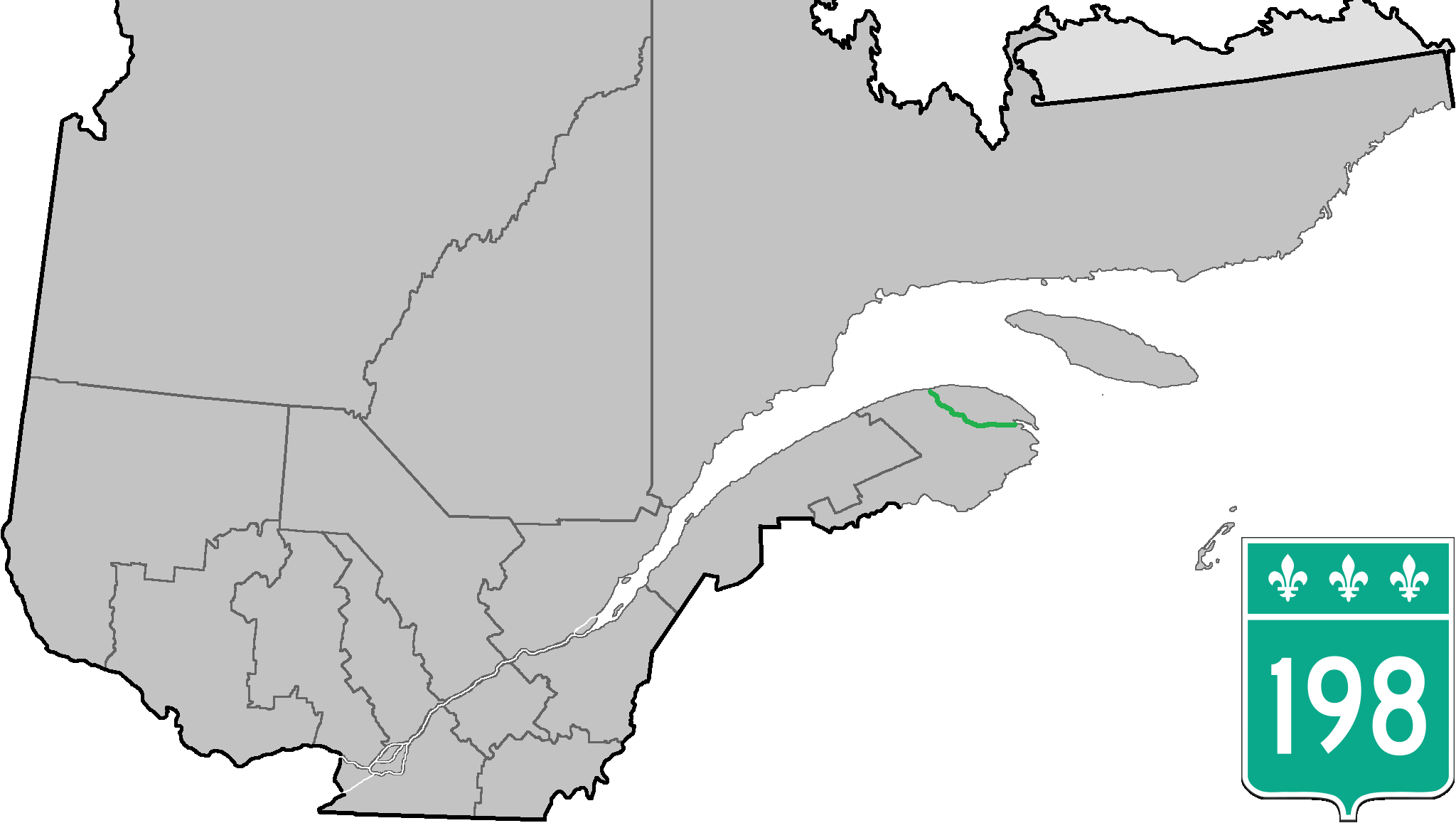

Route information
- Maintained by Transports Québec
- Length: 140.5 km (87.3 mi)

Major junctions
- West end: R-132 in L'Anse-Pleureuse
- East end: R-132 in Gaspé

Location
- Country: Canada
- Province: Quebec
- Major cities: Murdochville, Gaspé

Highway system
- Quebec provincial highways; Autoroutes; List; Former
← R-197	→ R-199

Route 198 is a 132 km two-lane highway which cuts through the Appalachian Mountains in the Gaspé Peninsula, Quebec, Canada. It acts both as a shortcut to get to Gaspé without having to go through many small villages and steep climbs on Route 132, and it also is the only link to Murdochville, the one municipality along this long stretch of highway. Route 198 starts at the junction of Route 132 in L'Anse-Pleureuse and ends again at the junction of Route 132 in Gaspé.

== Municipalities along Route 198 ==
- Saint-Maxime-du-Mont-Louis
- Mont-Albert
- Murdochville
- Collines-du-Basque
- Rivière-Saint-Jean
- Gaspé

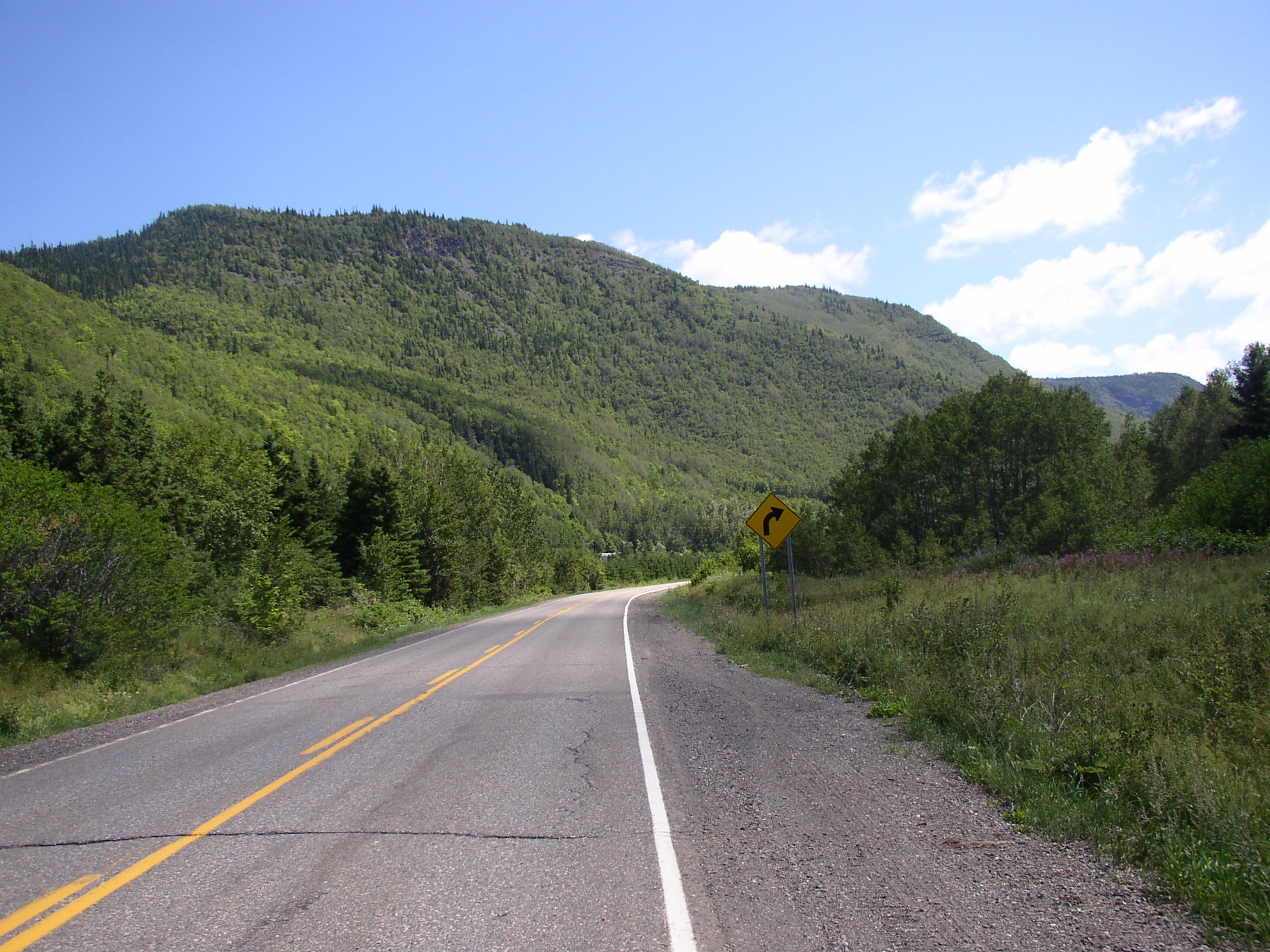
Route 198 Quebec

== Major intersections ==
The entire route is in La Haute-Gaspésie RCM.

Location	km	mi	Destinations	Notes
Saint-Maxime-du-Mont-Louis	0.0	0.0	R-132 – Sainte-Anne-des-Monts, Gaspé	
Murdochville	39.8	24.7		
Gaspé	132.7	82.5	R-132 west / Rue Adams – Sainte-Anne-des-Monts	West end of R-132 concurrency
Gaspé	133.2	82.8	R-132 east – Haldimand	East end of R-132 concurrency
Gaspé	140.5	87.3	R-132 – Haldimand, Percé, Chandler	
1.000 mi = 1.609 km; 1.000 km = 0.621 mi: Concurrency terminus

== See also ==
- List of Quebec provincial highways
