= Matane (provincial electoral district) =

Former provincial electoral district in Quebec, Canada

Quebec electoral district

Defunct provincial electoral district
- Legislature: National Assembly of Quebec
- District created: 1890
- District abolished: 2011
- First contested: 1890
- Last contested: 2008

Demographics
- Electors (2008): 27,977
- Area (km²): 8,415.6
- Census division(s): La Haute-Gaspésie (all), Matane (all)
- Census subdivision(s): Baie-des-Sables, Cap-Chat, Grosses-Roches, La Martre, Les Méchins, Marsoui, Matane, Mont-Saint-Pierre, Rivière-à-Claude, Saint-Adelme, Sainte-Anne-des-Monts, Sainte-Félicité, Saint-Jean-de-Cherbourg, Saint-Léandre, Sainte-Madeleine-de-la-Rivière-Madeleine, Saint-Maxime-du-Mont-Louis, Sainte-Paule, Saint-René-de-Matane, Saint-Ulric; Coulée-des-Adolphe, Mont-Albert, Rivière-Bonjour

Matane (French pronunciation: [matan]) is a former provincial electoral district in the Bas-Saint-Laurent and Gaspésie–Îles-de-la-Madeleine regions of Quebec, Canada, that elected members to the National Assembly of Quebec.

It was created for the 1890 election from parts of Rimouski. Its final election was in 2008. It disappeared in the 2012 election and its successor electoral districts were Matane-Matapédia and Gaspé.

== Geography ==
It is located at the western end of the Gaspé Peninsula, along the southern shore of the Saint Lawrence River.

It consists of the municipalities of:

- Baie-des-Sables
- Cap-Chat
- Grosses-Roches
- La Martre
- Les Méchins
- Marsoui
- Matane
- Mont-Saint-Pierre
- Rivière-à-Claude
- Saint-Adelme
- Saint-Jean-de-Cherbourg
- Saint-Léandre
- Saint-Maxime-du-Mont-Louis
- Saint-René-de-Matane
- Saint-Ulric
- Sainte-Anne-des-Monts
- Sainte-Félicité
- Sainte-Madeleine-de-la-Rivière-Madeleine
- Sainte-Paule

It also consists of the unorganized territories of:

- Coulée-des-Adolphe
- Mont-Albert
- Rivière-Bonjour

== Linguistic demographics ==
- Francophone: 99.5%
- Anglophone: 0.3%
- Allophone: 0.1%

== Members of the Legislative Assembly / National Assembly ==
Legislature	Years	Member	Party
7th	1890–1892	Louis-Félix Pinault	Liberal
8th	1892	Edmund James Flynn	Conservative
8th	1892–1897	Louis-Félix Pinault	Liberal
9th	1897–1898	Louis-Félix Pinault	Liberal
9th	1899–1900	Donat Caron	Liberal
10th	1900–1904	Donat Caron	Liberal
11th	1904–1908	Donat Caron	Liberal
12th	1908–1912	Donat Caron	Liberal
13th	1912–1916	Donat Caron	Liberal
14th	1916–1918	Donat Caron	Liberal
14th	1918–1919	Octave Fortin	Liberal
15th	1919–1923	Joseph Dufour	Liberal
16th	1923–1927	Joseph-Arthur Bergeron	Liberal
17th	1927–1931	Joseph-Arthur Bergeron	Liberal
18th	1931–1935	Joseph-Arthur Bergeron	Liberal
19th	1935–1936	Joseph-Arthur Bergeron	Liberal
20th	1936–1939	Onésime Gagnon	Union nationale
21st	1939–1944	Onésime Gagnon	Union nationale
22nd	1944–1948	Onésime Gagnon	Union nationale
23rd	1948–1952	Onésime Gagnon	Union nationale
24th	1952–1956	Onésime Gagnon	Union nationale
25th	1956–1958	Onésime Gagnon	Union nationale
25th	1958–1960	Benoît Gaboury	Union nationale
26th	1960–1962	Philippe Castonguay	Liberal
27th	1962–1963	Philippe Castonguay	Liberal
27th	1964–1966	Jacques Bernier	Liberal
28th	1966–1970	Jean Bienvenue	Liberal
29th	1970–1973	Jean Bienvenue	Liberal
30th	1973–1976	Marc-Yvan Côté	Liberal
31st	1976–1981	Yves Bérubé	Parti Québécois
32nd	1981–1985	Yves Bérubé	Parti Québécois
33rd	1985–1989	Claire-Hélène Hovington	Liberal
34th	1989–1994	Claire-Hélène Hovington	Liberal
35th	1994–1998	Matthias Rioux	Parti Québécois
36th	1998–2003	Matthias Rioux	Parti Québécois
37th	2003–2007	Nancy Charest	Liberal
38th	2007–2008	Pascal Bérubé	Parti Québécois
39th	2008–2012	Pascal Bérubé	Parti Québécois

== Electoral results ==
2003 Quebec general election
Party	Candidate	Votes	%
Liberal	Nancy Charest	7,602	40.84
Parti Québécois	Pascal Bérubé	7,569	40.67
Action démocratique	Raynald Bernier	3,005	16.14
Independent	Nelson Gauthier	178	0.96
Independent	Nestor Turcotte	135	0.73
Green	David Lejeune	124	0.67

2007 Quebec general election
Party	Candidate	Votes	%
Parti Québécois	Pascal Bérubé	7,830	39.10
Liberal	Nancy Charest	7,617	38.04
Action démocratique	Donald Grenier	3,980	19.88
Québec solidaire	Brigitte Michaud	358	1.79
Green	François Vincent	240	1.20

2008 Quebec general election
Party	Candidate	Votes	%
Parti Québécois	Pascal Bérubé	9,589	58.01
Liberal	Eric Plourde	5,503	33.29
Action démocratique	Denis Paquette	1,117	6.76
Québec solidaire	Gilles Arteau	320	1.94

1995 Quebec referendum
Side	Votes	%
Oui	15,611	62.46
Non	9,381	37.54

1980 Quebec referendum
Side	Votes	%
Non	12,285	52,41
Oui	11,154	47,59

== See also ==
- List of Quebec provincial electoral districts
- Canadian provincial electoral districts
