= Matthias Rioux =

Canadian politician

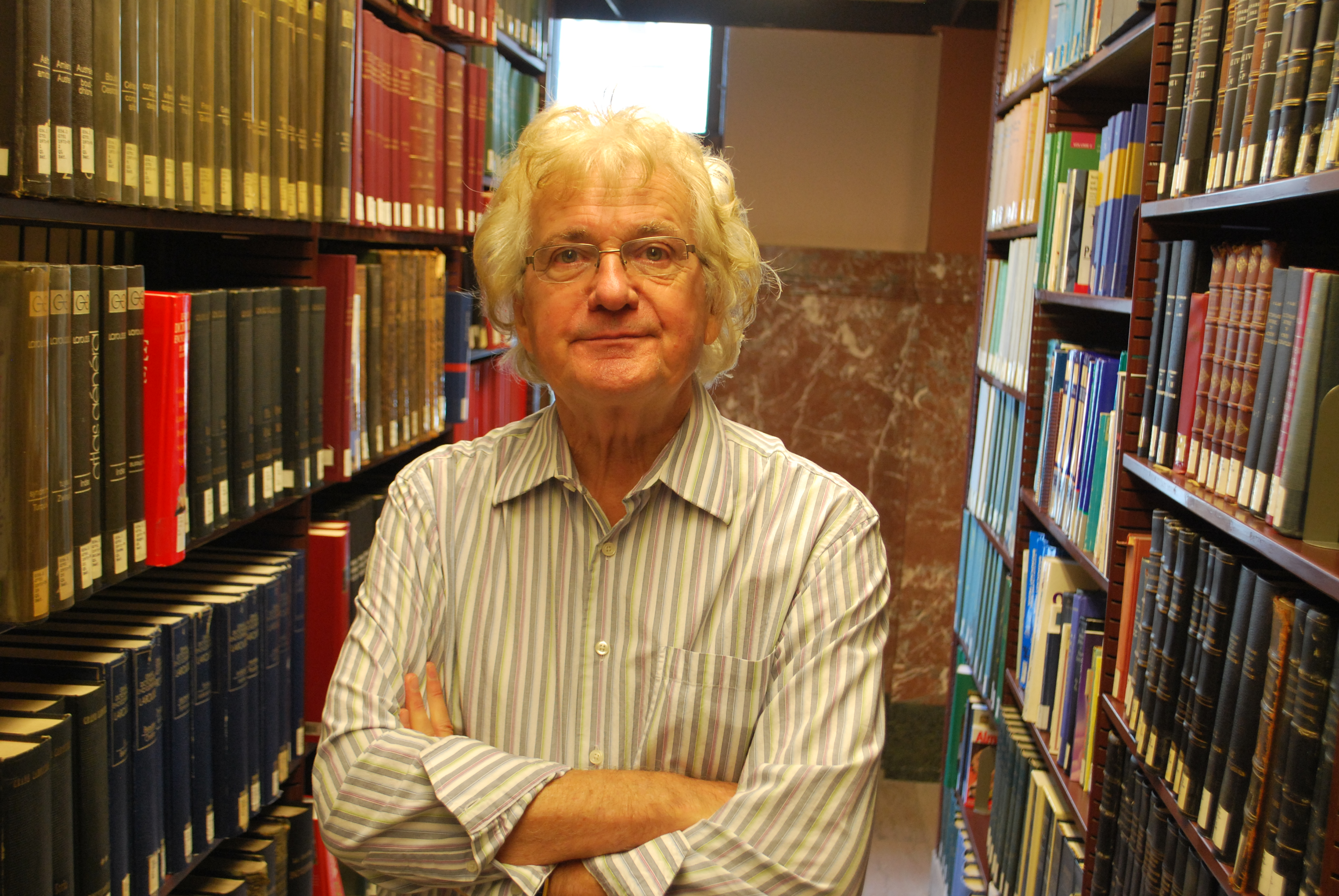
- Matthias Rioux in 2013

MNA for Matane
- In office 1994–2003
- Preceded by: Claire-Hélène Hovington
- Succeeded by: Nancy Charest

Personal details
- Born: March 29, 1934 (age 92) Rivière-à-Claude, Quebec
- Party: Parti Québécois

Matthias Rioux (born March 29, 1934) is a Canadian politician who represented the electoral district of Matane in the National Assembly of Quebec from 1994 to 2003 as a member of the Parti Québécois.
