= Gaspé (provincial electoral district) =

Provincial electoral district in Quebec, Canada

Coordinates: 48.922°N 65.612°W

Quebec electoral district

Provincial electoral district
- Legislature: National Assembly of Quebec
MNA
Méganne Perry Mélançon
Parti Québécois
- District created: 1867
- District abolished: 1930
- District re-created: 1972
- First contested: 1867
- Last contested: 2026

Demographics
- Electors (2018): 30,033
- Area (km²): 33,128.4
- Census division(s): La Haute-Gaspésie (all), La Côte-de-Gaspé (all), Le Rocher-Percé (part)
- Census subdivision(s): Cap-Chat, Cloridorme, Gaspé, Grande-Rivière, Grande-Vallée, La Martre, Marsoui, Mont-Saint-Pierre, Murdochville, Percé, Petite-Vallée, Rivière-à-Claude, Sainte-Anne-des-Monts, Sainte-Madeleine-de-la-Rivière-Madeleine, Saint-Maxime-du-Mont-Louis, Sainte-Thérèse-de-Gaspé; Collines-du-Basque, Coulée-des-Adolphe, Mont-Albert, Mont-Alexandre, Rivière-Saint-Jean

Gaspé (French pronunciation: [ɡaspe]) is a provincial electoral district in the Gaspésie–Îles-de-la-Madeleine region of Quebec, Canada, which elects members to the National Assembly of Quebec. It is located on the eastern edge of the Gaspé Peninsula. It notably includes the municipalities of Gaspé, Sainte-Anne-des-Monts, Grande-Rivière, and Percé.

It was originally created for the 1867 election (and an electoral district of that name existed earlier in the Legislative Assembly of the Province of Canada and the Legislative Assembly of Lower Canada). Its final election was in 1927. It disappeared in the 1931 election and its successor electoral districts were Gaspé-Nord and Gaspé-Sud.

It was re-created for the 1973 election by merging part of Gaspé-Nord with all of Gaspé-Sud, which both ceased to exist.

In the change from the 2001 to the 2011 electoral map, it gained all of La Haute-Gaspésie Regional County Municipality from the former Matane, namely the municipalities of Cap-Chat, La Martre, Marsoui, Mont-Saint-Pierre, Rivière-à-Claude, Sainte-Anne-des-Monts, Sainte-Madeleine-de-la-Rivière-Madeleine, Saint-Maxime-du-Mont-Louis and the unorganized territories of Coulée-des-Adolphe, and Mont-Albert.

== Linguistic demographics ==
- Francophone: 91.3%
- Anglophone: 8.4%
- Allophone: 0.2%

== Members of the Legislative / National Assembly ==
Legislature	Years	Member	Party
1st	1867–1871	Pierre-Étienne Fortin	Conservative
2nd	1871–1873	Pierre-Étienne Fortin	Conservative
2nd	1873–1875	Pierre-Étienne Fortin	Conservative
3rd	1875–1877	Pierre-Étienne Fortin	Conservative
3rd	1877–1878	Pierre-Étienne Fortin	Conservative
4th	1878–1879	Edmund James Flynn	Conservative
4th	1879–1881	Edmund James Flynn	Conservative
5th	1881–1884	Edmund James Flynn	Conservative
5th	1884–1886	Edmund James Flynn	Conservative
6th	1886–1890	Edmund James Flynn	Conservative
7th	1890–1892	Achille-Ferdinand Carrier	Liberal
8th	1892–1897	Edmund James Flynn	Conservative
9th	1897–1900	Edmund James Flynn	Conservative
10th	1900–1904	Xavier Kennedy	Liberal
11th	1904–1908	Louis-Joseph Lemieux	Liberal
12th	1908–1910	Louis-Joseph Lemieux	Liberal
12th	1910–1912	Joseph-Léonide Perron	Liberal
13th	1912–1916	Gustave Lemieux	Liberal
14th	1916–1919	Gustave Lemieux	Liberal
15th	1919–1923	Gustave Lemieux	Liberal
16th	1923–1927	Gustave Lemieux	Liberal
17th	1927–1931	Gustave Lemieux	Liberal
Riding dissolved into Gaspé-Nord and Gaspé-Sud
Riding re-created from Gaspé-Nord and Gaspé-Sud
30th	1973–1976	Guy Fortier	Liberal
31st	1976–1981	Michel Le Moignan	Union Nationale
32nd	1981–1985	Henri Lemay	Parti Québécois
33rd	1985–1989	André Beaudin	Liberal
34th	1989–1994	André Beaudin	Liberal
35th	1994–1998	Guy Lelièvre	Parti Québécois
36th	1998–2003	Guy Lelièvre	Parti Québécois
37th	2003–2007	Guy Lelièvre	Parti Québécois
38th	2007–2008	Guy Lelièvre	Parti Québécois
39th	2008–2012	Georges Mamelonet	Liberal
40th	2012–2014	Gaétan Lelièvre	Parti Québécois
41st	2014–2017	Gaétan Lelièvre	Parti Québécois
41st	2017–2018	Gaétan Lelièvre	Independent
42nd	2018–2022	Méganne Perry Mélançon	Parti Québécois
43rd	2022–2026	Stéphane Sainte-Croix	Coalition Avenir Québec
44th	2026–Present	Méganne Perry Mélançon	Parti Québécois

== Electoral results ==
2026 Quebec general election
** Preliminary results — Not yet official **
Party	Candidate	Votes	%	±%
Parti Québécois	Méganne Perry Mélançon	10,525	58.81	+21.34
Coalition Avenir Québec	Stéphane Sainte-Croix	2,404	13.49	–27.96
Liberal	Michel Marin	2,278	12.73	+5.85
Conservative	Christian Pierry	1,358	7.59	+2.34
Québec solidaire	Emmanuelle Babin	1,322	7.39	–1.58
Total valid votes		17,897	98.71	–0.28
Total rejected ballots		233	1.29	+0.28
Turnout		18,130	60.21	–0.75
Electors on the lists		30,110		
Parti Québécois gain from Coalition Avenir Québec		Swing		+24.65
Source: Élections Québec

2022 Quebec general election
Party	Candidate	Votes	%	±%
Coalition Avenir Québec	Stéphane Sainte-Croix	7,542	41.40	+21.80
Parti Québécois	Méganne Perry Mélançon	6,832	37.50	+4.09
Québec solidaire	Yv Bonnier Viger	1,634	8.97	–4.84
Liberal	Michel Marin	1,255	6.89	–26.29
Conservative	Pier-Luc Bouchard	956	5.25	New
Total valid votes		18,219	98.99	
Total rejected ballots		185	1.01	-0.62
Turnout		18,404	60.96	+0.14
Electors on the lists		30,190		
Coalition Avenir Québec gain from Parti Québécois		Swing		+8.86
Source: Élections Québec

2018 Quebec general election
Party	Candidate	Votes	%	±%
Parti Québécois	Méganne Perry Mélançon	6,003	33.41	-18.62
Liberal	Alexandre Boulay	5,962	33.18	-0.62
Coalition Avenir Québec	Louis LeBouthillier	3,521	19.6	+13.41
Québec solidaire	Alexis Dumont-Blanchet	2,482	13.81	+8.68
Total valid votes		17,968	98.37	
Total rejected ballots		297	1.63	
Turnout		18,265	60.82	-2.32
Eligible voters		30,033		
Parti Québécois hold		Swing		-9
These results were subject to a judicial recount, and modified from the validated results in accordance with the Judge's rulings. The initial results declared Alexandre Boulay the victor by a margin of 132 votes. The recount resulted in Perry Mélançon's victory by 41 votes.
Source(s) "Rapport des résultats officiels du scrutin". Élections Québec. "Parti Québécois wins Gaspé in recount as investigation launched into vote". CBC News. 10 October 2018.

2014 Quebec general election
Party	Candidate	Votes	%	±%
Parti Québécois	Gaétan Lelièvre	10,026	52.03	-4.76
Liberal	Annie St-Onge	6,513	33.80	+5.69
Coalition Avenir Québec	Yvan Blanchard	1,192	6.19	-3.28
Québec solidaire	Daniel Leboeuf	989	5.13	+1.75
Parti nul	Catherine Beau-Ferron	255	1.32	–
Option nationale	Frédérick DeRoy	194	1.01	-0.89
Conservative	Christian Rioux	99	0.51	–
Total valid votes		19,268	98.92	–
Total rejected ballots		210	1.08	–
Turnout		19,478	63.14	-4.44
Electors on the lists		30,850	–	–

2012 Quebec general election
Party	Candidate	Votes	%	±%
Parti Québécois	Gaétan Lelièvre	11,825	56.79	+17.28
Liberal	Georges Mamelonet	5,853	28.11	-28.14
Coalition Avenir Québec	Yvan Blanchard	1,971	9.47	+6.33
Québec solidaire	Eric Boucher	1,221	3.38	+2.28
Option nationale	Frédérick DeRoy	395	1.90	–
Total valid votes		20,823	99.02	–
Total rejected ballots		207	1.24	–
Turnout		21,030	67.58	+9.41
Electors on the lists		31,119	–	–

2008 Quebec general election
Party	Candidate	Votes	%	±%
Liberal	Georges Mamelonet	8,947	56.25	+18.71
Parti Québécois	Annie Chouinard	6,285	39.51	-1.45
Action démocratique	Marcelle Guay	499	3.14	-13.77
Québec solidaire	Simon Tremblay-Pepin	175	1.10	-3.49

2007 Quebec general election
Party	Candidate	Votes	%	±%
Parti Québécois	Guy Lelièvre	7,662	40.96	-6.44
Liberal	Georges Mamelonet	7,022	37.54	-4.72
Action démocratique	Bruno Cloutier	3,162	16.91	+7.76
Québec solidaire	Annie Chouinard	858	4.59	–

2003 Quebec general election
Party	Candidate	Votes	%	±%
Parti Québécois	Guy Lelièvre	9,033	47.40	-3.01
Liberal	Johnny Gérard	8,052	42.26	-2.44
Action démocratique	Denis Paradis	1,743	9.15	+4.26
Green	Luc-Reno Fournier	227	1.19	–

1998 Quebec general election
Party	Candidate	Votes	%
Parti Québécois	Guy Lelièvre	11,047	50.41
Liberal	Claude Cyr	9,795	44.70
Action démocratique	Annie Fortier	1,072	4.89
Total valid votes		21,914	98.94
Total rejected ballots		235	1.06
Turnout		22,149	74.62
Electors on the lists		29,684	–

1995 Quebec referendum
Side	Votes	%
Oui	15,186	58.50
Non	10,771	41.50

1994 Quebec general election
Party	Candidate	Votes	%
Parti Québécois	Guy Lelièvre	11,410	53.39
Liberal	John Carbery	8,033	37.58
Action démocratique	Bruno Cloutier	1,774	8.30
Natural Law	Manon Isabelle	156	0.73
Total valid votes		21,373	98.73
Total rejected ballots		274	1.27
Turnout		21,647	73.51
Electors on the lists		29,448	–

1992 Charlottetown Accord referendum
Side	Votes	%
Non	12,956	59.15
Oui	8,948	40.85

1989 Quebec general election
Party	Candidate	Votes	%
Liberal	André Beaudin	11,287	51.00
Parti Québécois	Danielle Doyer	9,350	42.25
Unity	Howard Miller	1,160	5.24
Independent	Yvon Dubé	334	1.51
Total valid votes		22,131	98.87
Total rejected ballots		252	1.13
Turnout		22,383	71.41
Electors on the lists		31,345	–

1985 Quebec general election
Party	Candidate	Votes	%
Liberal	André Beaudin	13,880	57.71
Parti Québécois	Henri Lemay	9,880	41.08
Christian Socialist	Gilles Paradis	290	1.21
Total valid votes		24,050	98.80
Total rejected ballots		292	1.20
Turnout		24,342	74.47
Electors on the lists		32,688	–

1981 Quebec general election
Party	Candidate	Votes	%
Parti Québécois	Henri Lemay	12,136	47.08
Liberal	Robert Pidgeon	10,904	42.30
Union Nationale	Michel Le Moignan	2,739	10.62
Total valid votes		25,779	99.44
Total rejected ballots		144	0.56
Turnout		25,923	81.08
Electors on the lists		31,972	–

1980 Quebec referendum
Side	Votes	%
Non	14,941	58.88
Oui	10,435	41.12

1976 Quebec general election
Party	Candidate	Votes	%
Union Nationale	Michel Le Moignan	8,305	34.53
Liberal	Guy Fortier	7,885	32.78
Parti Québécois	Jules Belanger	7,630	31.72
Ralliement créditiste	Mario Gagnon	233	0.97
Total valid votes		24,053	98.69
Total rejected ballots		319	1.31
Turnout		24,372	82.01
Electors on the lists		29,720	–

1973 Quebec general election
Party	Candidate	Votes	%
Liberal	Guy Fortier	13,004	62.25
Parti Québécois	Claude Allard	6,055	28.99
Union Nationale	Bertrand Gaudreau	1,141	5.46
Parti créditiste	Wilfrid Bérubé	690	3.30
Total valid votes		20,890	98.60
Total rejected ballots		296	1.40
Turnout		21,186	75.67
Electors on the lists		27,997	–

== See also ==
- List of Quebec provincial electoral districts
- Canadian provincial electoral districts
