= Mont-Saint-Pierre Ecological Reserve =

Ecological reserve in Quebec, Canada

Coordinates: 49.1889°N 65.7925°W

- IUCN category Ia (strict nature reserve)
- Interactive map of Mont-Saint-Pierre Ecological Reserve
- Location: Mont-Saint-Pierre, La Haute-Gaspésie Regional County Municipality, Québec, Canada
- Established: January 31, 2001

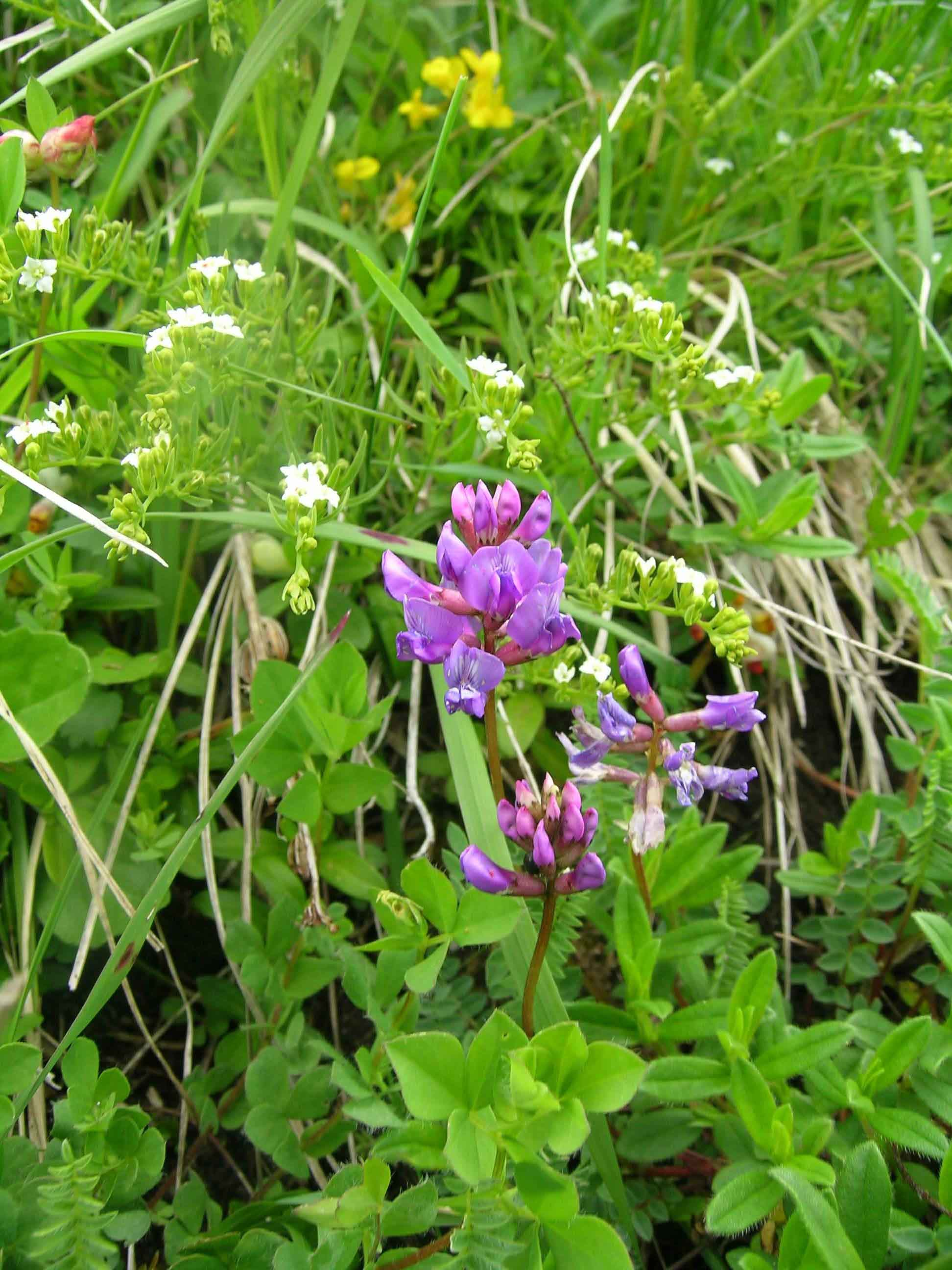
Astragalus australis flowering in the Mont-Saint-Pierre Ecological Reserve in Quebec, Canada

Mont-Saint-Pierre Ecological Reserve (French: Réserve écologique de Mont-Saint-Pierre, pronounced [ʁezɛʁv ekɔlɔʒik də mɔ̃ sɛ̃ pjɛʁ]) is an ecological reserve in Quebec, Canada. It was established on January 31, 2001.
