= Pascal Bérubé =

Canadian politician and television host

Pascal Berube MNA
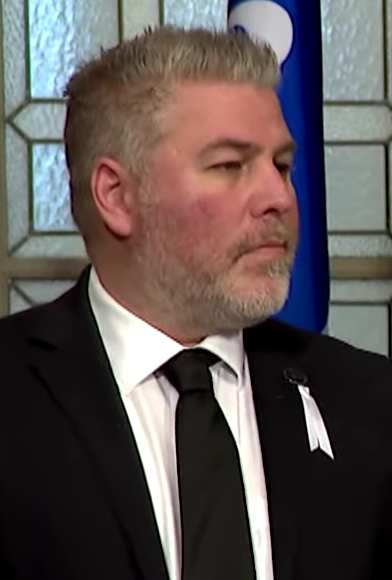
- Bérubé in 2023

Interim Leader of the Parti Québécois
- In office October 9, 2018 – October 9, 2020
- Preceded by: Jean-François Lisée
- Succeeded by: Paul St-Pierre Plamondon

Member of the National Assembly of Quebec for Matane-Matapédia Matane (2007–2012)
- Incumbent
- Assumed office March 26, 2007
- Preceded by: Nancy Charest

Personal details
- Born: February 16, 1975 (age 51) Matane, Quebec
- Party: Parti Québécois
- Profession: television host
- Portfolio: Financial aid for educational studies, sports and leisure

Pascal Bérubé (French pronunciation: [paskal beʁybe]; born February 16, 1975, in Matane, Quebec) is a Canadian politician and television host. He is the current Member of National Assembly of Quebec for the riding of Matane-Matapédia (formerly Matane) and represents the Parti Québécois. He was appointed interim leader of the party following the October 1, 2018 Québec election in which Jean-François Lisée lost his seat and resigned the leadership.

Berubé studied at Université du Québec à Rimouski and obtained a bachelor's degree in education sciences. He later worked as a coordinator for Matane and La Haute-Gaspesie regional county municipalities and a political aide for the Minister of Education and the Minister of Regions. He was also a television host and researcher at Cogeco in Matane, and the former vice-president of the Fédération étudiante universitaire du Québec.

Bérubé was a candidate for Matane in the 2003 elections but was defeated by the Liberal Candidate Nancy Charest. In 2007, he defeated Charest by just over 200 votes. He was named the PQ's critic in communitarian action but later promoted to the portfolio of financial aid for studies.

He was re-elected in 2012, 2014, 2018, and 2022.

He was nominated Opposition House Leader by Jean-François Lisée in October 2016 and was named interim leader of the Parti Quebecois on October 9, 2018.

== Electoral record ==
2026 Quebec general election: Matane-Matapédia-Mitis
** Preliminary results — Not yet official **
Party	Candidate	Votes	%	±%
Parti Québécois	Pascal Bérubé	19,801	67.83	
Conservative	Patrice Caron	3,867	13.25	
Liberal	André Côté	1,974	6.76	
Coalition Avenir Québec	Henry Maclaren	1,927	6.60	
Québec solidaire	Gabriel Plante	1,347	4.61	
Parti nul	Alexandre Mari0 Br0s Cossette	174	0.60	
Démocratie directe	Michel Lefrancois	103	0.35	
Total valid votes				
Total rejected ballots				
Turnout			63.42	
Electors on the lists			–	–
Source: Élections Québec

2022 Quebec general election: Matane-Matapédia
Party	Candidate	Votes	%	±%
Parti Québécois	Pascal Bérubé	20,057	67.43	–2.03
Coalition Avenir Québec	Jean-Sébastien Barriault	5,163	17.36	+6.00
Conservative	Alexandre Leblanc	2,316	7.79	+7.26
Québec solidaire	Marie-Phare Boucher	1,450	4.87	–0.91
Liberal	Harley Ryan Lounsbury	637	2.14	–9.13
L'Union fait la force	Madeleine Rose	123	0.41	New
Total valid votes		29,746	98.98	
Total rejected ballots		307	1.02	+0.25
Turnout		30,053	64.93	–0.45
Electors on the lists		46,286		
Parti Québécois hold		Swing		–4.02
Source: Élections Québec

2018 Quebec general election: Matane-Matapédia
Party	Candidate	Votes	%	±%
Parti Québécois	Pascal Bérubé	20,658	69.46	+8.3
Coalition Avenir Québec	Mathieu Quenum	3,379	11.36	+1.12
Liberal	Annie Fournier	3,351	11.27	-11.5
Québec solidaire	Marie-Phare Boucher	1,718	5.78	+0.65
Green	Pierre-Luc Coulombe	358	1.2	
Conservative	Paul-Émile Vignola	159	0.53	
Citoyens au pouvoir	Jocelyn Rioux	118	0.4	
Total valid votes		29,741	99.23	
Total rejected ballots		230	0.77	
Turnout		29,971	65.38	
Eligible voters		45,840		
Parti Québécois hold		Swing		+3.59
Source(s) "Rapport des résultats officiels du scrutin". Élections Québec.

2014 Quebec general election
Party	Candidate	Votes	%	±%
Parti Québécois	Pascal Bérubé	18,025	61.16	+2.17
Liberal	Dave Gravel	6,712	22.77	+4.09
Coalition Avenir Québec	Yann Gobeil-Nadon	3,019	10.24	-5.67
Québec solidaire	Gérald Tremblay	1,511	5.13	0.00
Option nationale	Joëlle Vadeboncoeur Harrison	207	0.70	-0.61
Total valid votes		29,474	98.49	–
Total rejected ballots		453	1.51	–
Turnout		29,927	63.00	–
Electors on the lists		47,356	–	–

2012 Quebec general election
Party	Candidate	Votes	%	±%
Parti Québécois	Pascal Bérubé	19,768	58.99	–
Liberal	Jean-Clément Ouellet	6,263	18.69	–
Coalition Avenir Québec	Pierre D'Amours	5,332	15.91	–
Québec solidaire	Diane Bélanger	1,230	3.67	–
Option nationale	Geneviève Allard	440	1.31	–
Green	Lise Deschênes	348	1.04	–
Équipe Autonomiste	Pascal Gauthier	127	0.38	–
Total valid votes		33,508	99.17	–
Total rejected ballots		280	0.83	–
Turnout		33,788	70.96	–
Electors on the lists		47,613	–	–

2008 Quebec general election: Matane
Party	Candidate	Votes	%
Parti Québécois	Pascal Bérubé	9,589	58.01
Liberal	Eric Plourde	5,503	33.29
Action démocratique	Denis Paquette	1,117	6.76
Québec solidaire	Gilles Arteau	320	1.94

2007 Quebec general election: Matane
Party	Candidate	Votes	%
Parti Québécois	Pascal Bérubé	7,830	39.10
Liberal	Nancy Charest	7,617	38.04
Action démocratique	Donald Grenier	3,980	19.88
Québec solidaire	Brigitte Michaud	358	1.79
Green	François Vincent	240	1.20

2003 Quebec general election: Matane
Party	Candidate	Votes	%
Liberal	Nancy Charest	7,602	40.84
Parti Québécois	Pascal Bérubé	7,569	40.67
Action démocratique	Raynald Bernier	3,005	16.14
Independent	Nelson Gauthier	178	0.96
Independent	Nestor Turcotte	135	0.73
Green	David Lejeune	124	0.67
