= Notre-Dame Cemetery (Ottawa) =

Cemetery in Ottawa, Ontario, Canada

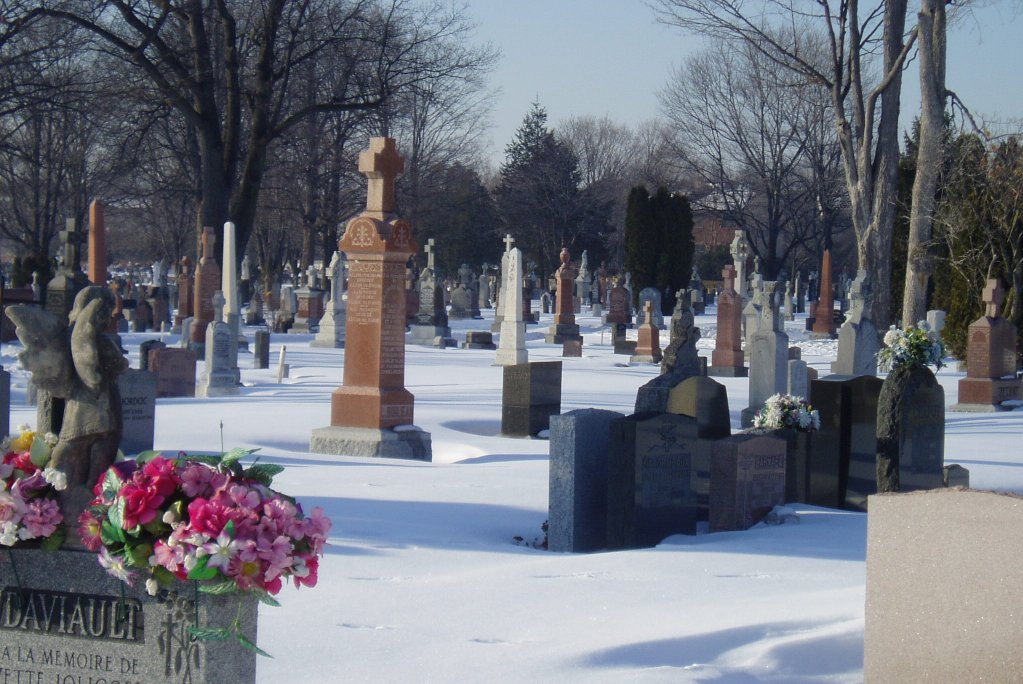
- Notre-Dame Cemetery in winter.
- Interactive map of Notre-Dame Cemetery

Details
- Established: 1872
- Location: Ottawa, Ontario
- Country: Canada
- Coordinates: 45.442°N 75.652°W
- Style: Roman Catholic
- Owned by: Roman Catholic Archdiocese of Ottawa–Cornwall
- No. of graves: 114,000
- Website: Official website
- Find a Grave: Notre-Dame Cemetery

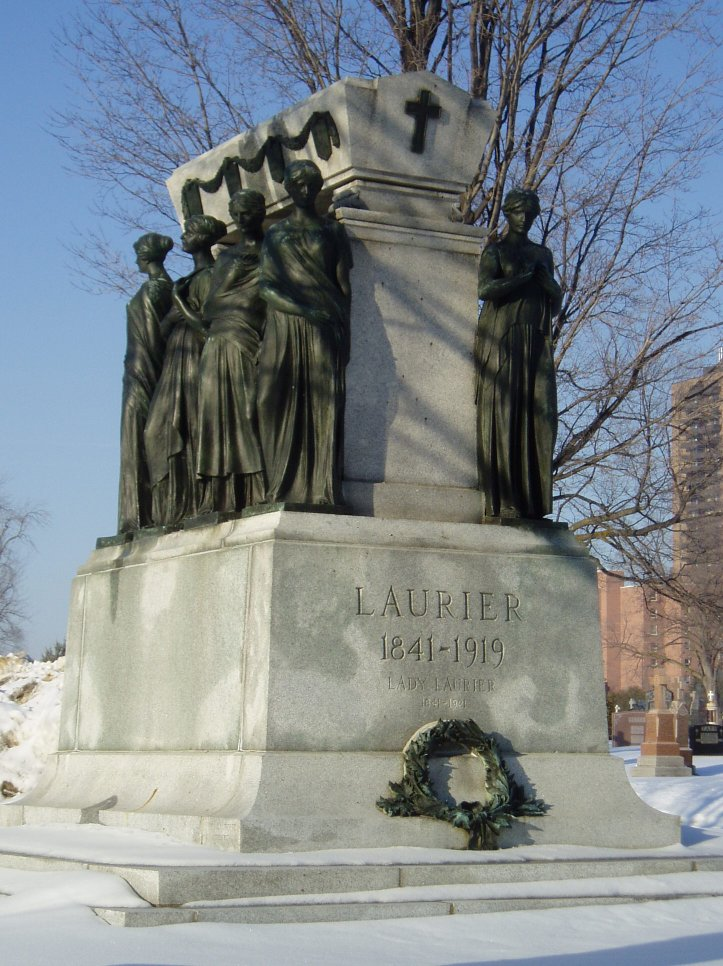
Wilfrid Laurier's grave, sculpted by Alfred Laliberté, in Notre-Dame Cemetery (Ottawa)

Notre Dame Cemetery, is a Catholic cemetery in Ottawa, Ontario, Canada. Opened in 1872, it is the most prominent Catholic cemetery in Ottawa. The cemetery's western edge is located in Vanier, just south of Beechwood Cemetery. Its eastern limit is St. Laurent Boulevard. The cemetery is the final resting place for more than 114,000 people.

The cemetery was established as a result of a bylaw passed in 1872, which banned the burial of human remains within the city's boundaries after the end of that calendar year. The bylaw was an attempt to control the spread of diseases such as smallpox, which was prevalent in the city at that time. Many remains and grave markers from the Catholic section of the Sandy Hill Cemetery were transferred to Notre Dame when it was opened.

== Notable interments ==
- Frank Amyot (1904-1962), Olympic sprint canoeist
- Janis Babson (1950–1961), Corneal transplant donor
- Bruno Bitkowski (1929–1966), Football player
- Billy Boucher (1899–1958), Hockey player
- Bobby Boucher (1904–1931), Hockey player
- E. A. Bourque (1887–1962), Mayor of Ottawa
- Ed Broadbent, Leader of the federal New Democratic Party
- Ernie Calcutt (1932–1984), Ottawa Rough Riders announcer and Canadian Football Hall of Fame inductee
- Earl Campbell (1900-1953), Hockey player
- Benjamin Chee Chee (1944–1977), Ojibwe artist
- Gene Chouinard (1902-1957), Hockey player
- Alec Connell (1902–1958), Hockey Hall of Fame player
- Paul Drouin (1916-1968), Hockey player
- Sammy Hebert (1893-1965), Hockey player
- Aurèle Joliat (1901–1986), Hockey Hall of Fame player
- Yousuf Karsh (1908–2002), Portrait photographer
- Ray Kinsella (1910–1996), Hockey player
- Filip Konowal (1886–1959), World War I hero, awarded the Victoria Cross
- Alan Kuntz (1919–1987), Hockey player
- Sir Wilfrid Laurier (1841–1919), Prime Minister of Canada
- Gerry Lowrey (1906–1979), Hockey player
- Kilby MacDonald (1913–1986), Hockey player
- Jack MacKell (1896–1961), Hockey player
- Champlain Marcil (1920–2010), Photographer
- Louis-Félix Pinault (1852–1906), Statesman
- Silver Quilty (1891–1976), Canadian Football Hall of Fame and Canada's Sports Hall of Fame inductee
- Yip Radley (1908-1963), Hockey player
- Eldon Rathburn (1916–2008), Film composer
- Larry Regan (1930–2009), Hockey player
- Anna T. Sadlier (1854–1932), Writer
- Alf Smith (1873–1953), Hockey player
- Rodger Smith (1896-1935), Hockey player
- Tommy Smith (1886–1966), Hockey Hall of Fame player

== War graves ==
The cemetery contains the war graves of 115 Commonwealth service personnel, 40 from World War I and 75 from World War II.
