= Georges Mamelonet =

Canadian politician

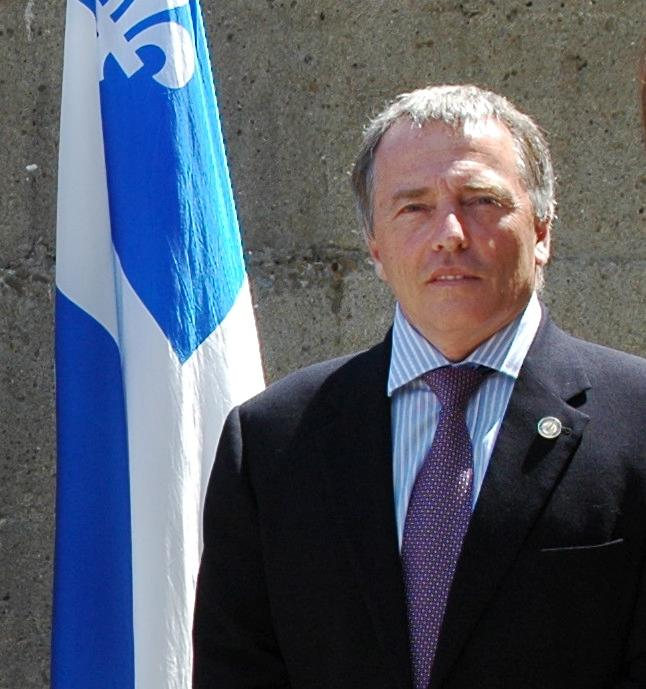
- Georges Mamelonet in 2010

MNA for Gaspé
- In office 8 December 2008 – 4 September 2012
- Preceded by: Guy Lelièvre
- Succeeded by: Gaétan Lelièvre

Personal details
- Born: 30 November 1954 Casablanca, Morocco
- Died: 11 March 2015 (aged 60) near Sainte-Angèle-de-Mérici, Quebec, Canada
- Party: Quebec Liberal Party

Georges Mamelonet (30 November 1954 – 11 March 2015) was a Canadian politician, who was elected to the National Assembly of Quebec for the riding of Gaspé in the 2008 provincial election. He was a member of the Quebec Liberal Party.

Prior to his election to the assembly, Mamelonet served as mayor of Percé. He studied at École de la Marine nationale in Marseille, France, as a steam and diesel mechanic before moving in the Gaspésie region in 1978 and worked as a businessman and restaurateur until starting his political career. Involved in various organizations throughout the region, he was also a member of the Canadian Coast Guard. He died in a car accident on 11 March 2015.
