= Stéphane Sainte-Croix =

Canadian politician

Member of the National Assembly of Quebec for Gaspé
- In office October 3, 2022 – October 5, 2026
- Preceded by: Méganne Perry Mélançon
- Succeeded by: Méganne Perry Mélançon

Personal details
- Born: 1969 Rimouski, Quebec
- Party: Coalition Avenir Québec

Stéphane Sainte-Croix is a Canadian politician, who was elected to the National Assembly of Quebec in the 2022 Quebec general election. He represented the riding of Gaspé as a member of the Coalition Avenir Québec. In the 2026 Quebec general election, he was unseated by Méganne Perry Mélançon from the Parti Québécois (PQ).

== Electoral record ==
2026 Quebec general election: Gaspé
** Preliminary results — Not yet official **
Party	Candidate	Votes	%	±%
Parti Québécois	Méganne Perry Mélançon	10,525	58.81	+21.34
Coalition Avenir Québec	Stéphane Sainte-Croix	2,404	13.49	–27.96
Liberal	Michel Marin	2,278	12.73	+5.85
Conservative	Christian Pierry	1,358	7.59	+2.34
Québec solidaire	Emmanuelle Babin	1,322	7.39	–1.58
Total valid votes		17,897	98.71	–0.28
Total rejected ballots		233	1.29	+0.28
Turnout		18,130	60.21	–0.75
Electors on the lists		30,110		
Parti Québécois gain from Coalition Avenir Québec		Swing		+24.65
Source: Élections Québec

2022 Quebec general election: Gaspé
Party	Candidate	Votes	%	±%
Coalition Avenir Québec	Stéphane Sainte-Croix	7,542	41.40	+21.80
Parti Québécois	Méganne Perry Mélançon	6,832	37.50	+4.09
Québec solidaire	Yv Bonnier Viger	1,634	8.97	–4.84
Liberal	Michel Marin	1,255	6.89	–26.29
Conservative	Pier-Luc Bouchard	956	5.25	New
Total valid votes		18,219	98.99	
Total rejected ballots		185	1.01	-0.62
Turnout		18,404	60.96	+0.14
Electors on the lists		30,190		
Coalition Avenir Québec gain from Parti Québécois		Swing		+8.86
Source: Élections Québec
