= Méganne Perry Mélançon =

Canadian politician

Méganne Perry Mélançon MNA

Member of the National Assembly of Quebec for Gaspé
- Incumbent
- Assumed office October 5, 2026
- Preceded by: Stéphane Sainte-Croix
- In office October 1, 2018 – August 28, 2022
- Preceded by: Gaétan Lelièvre
- Succeeded by: Stéphane Sainte-Croix

Personal details
- Born: May 10, 1990 (age 36) Gaspé, Quebec, Canada
- Party: Parti Québecois

Méganne Perry Mélançon (born May 10, 1990) is a Canadian politician, who was elected to the National Assembly of Quebec in the 2018 provincial election. She represented the electoral district of Gaspé as a member of the Parti Québécois until her defeat in the 2022 Quebec general election.

On election night, Perry Mélançon was declared to have been defeated by Alexandre Boulay of the Quebec Liberal Party. She was found to have defeated Boulay by a margin of 41 votes after a recount.

== Electoral record ==
2026 Quebec general election: Gaspé
** Preliminary results — Not yet official **
Party	Candidate	Votes	%	±%
Parti Québécois	Méganne Perry Mélançon	10,525	58.81	+21.34
Coalition Avenir Québec	Stéphane Sainte-Croix	2,404	13.49	–27.96
Liberal	Michel Marin	2,278	12.73	+5.85
Conservative	Christian Pierry	1,358	7.59	+2.34
Québec solidaire	Emmanuelle Babin	1,322	7.39	–1.58
Total valid votes		17,897	98.71	–0.28
Total rejected ballots		233	1.29	+0.28
Turnout		18,130	60.21	–0.75
Electors on the lists		30,110		
Parti Québécois gain from Coalition Avenir Québec		Swing		+24.65
Source: Élections Québec

2022 Quebec general election: Gaspé
Party	Candidate	Votes	%	±%
Coalition Avenir Québec	Stéphane Sainte-Croix	7,542	41.40	+21.80
Parti Québécois	Méganne Perry Mélançon	6,832	37.50	+4.09
Québec solidaire	Yv Bonnier Viger	1,634	8.97	–4.84
Liberal	Michel Marin	1,255	6.89	–26.29
Conservative	Pier-Luc Bouchard	956	5.25	New
Total valid votes		18,219	98.99	
Total rejected ballots		185	1.01	-0.62
Turnout		18,404	60.96	+0.14
Electors on the lists		30,190		
Coalition Avenir Québec gain from Parti Québécois		Swing		+8.86
Source: Élections Québec

2018 Quebec general election: Gaspé
Party	Candidate	Votes	%	±%
Parti Québécois	Méganne Perry Mélançon	6,003	33.41	-18.62
Liberal	Alexandre Boulay	5,962	33.18	-0.62
Coalition Avenir Québec	Louis LeBouthillier	3,521	19.6	+13.41
Québec solidaire	Alexis Dumont-Blanchet	2,482	13.81	+8.68
Total valid votes		17,968	98.37	
Total rejected ballots		297	1.63	
Turnout		18,265	60.82	-2.32
Eligible voters		30,033		
Parti Québécois hold		Swing		-9
These results were subject to a judicial recount, and modified from the validated results in accordance with the Judge's rulings. The initial results declared Alexandre Boulay the victor by a margin of 132 votes. The recount resulted in Perry Mélançon's victory by 41 votes.
Source(s) "Rapport des résultats officiels du scrutin". Élections Québec. "Parti Québécois wins Gaspé in recount as investigation launched into vote". CBC News. October 10, 2018.
