= Gaétan Lelièvre =

Canadian politician

Member of the National Assembly of Quebec for Gaspé
- In office September 4, 2012 – August 29, 2018
- Preceded by: Georges Mamelonet
- Succeeded by: Méganne Perry Mélançon

Personal details
- Party: Independent (2017-); Parti Québécois (2012-2017)

Gaétan Lelièvre is a Canadian politician. He is a member of the National Assembly of Quebec for the riding of Gaspé, first elected in the 2012 election and re-elected in 2014.

He was removed from the PQ caucus on May 16, 2017 after admitting to having received numerous gifts and perks from engineering firm Roche while serving as director general of the city of Gaspé.
