= Henri Lemay =

Canadian politician (1939–2021)

Parliamentary Assistant to the Minister of Agriculture, Fisheries and Food of Quebec
- In office 25 May 1983 – 20 December 1984
- Constituency: Gaspé

Deputy Minister of Municipal Affairs and Housing of Quebec
- In office 20 December 1984 – 12 December 1985
- Preceded by: François Gendron
- Succeeded by: Marc-Yvan Côté

Member of the National Assembly of Quebec
- In office 13 April 1981 – 12 December 1985
- Preceded by: Michel Le Moignan
- Succeeded by: André Beaudin

Personal details
- Born: Joseph Émile Henri Marcel Le May; 22 August 1939 Chicoutimi, Quebec, Canada
- Died: 4 April 2021 (aged 81) Quebec City, Quebec, Canada
- Party: Parti Québécois

Henri Lemay (22 August 1939 – 4 April 2021) was a Canadian politician and professor. A member of the Parti Québécois, he served on the National Assembly of Quebec for Gaspé from 1981 to 1985, and from 1983 to 1984, he was Parliamentary Assistant to the Minister of Agriculture, Fisheries and Food of Quebec. He also served as Deputy Minister of Municipal Affairs and Housing of Quebec from 1984 to 1985.

Henri Lemay died in Quebec City on 4 April 2021 at the age of 81.
