= Guy Lelièvre =

Canadian politician (1952–2021)

MNA for Gaspé
- In office September 12, 1994 – December 8, 2008
- Preceded by: André Beaudin
- Succeeded by: Georges Mamelonet

Personal details
- Born: March 20, 1952 Sainte-Thérèse-de-Gaspé, Quebec
- Died: March 30, 2021 (aged 69)
- Party: Parti Québécois
- Spouse: diane dumaresq
- Profession: lawyer

Guy Lelièvre (March 20, 1952 – March 29, 2021) was a Quebec politician and lawyer. He was the Member of National Assembly of Quebec for the riding of Gaspé. He represented the Parti Québécois from 1994 to 2008.

Lelièvre went to the Université du Québec à Montréal and obtained a bachelor's degree in juridical sciences in 1977 and was admitted to the Quebec Bar in 1979, where he practiced law for 15 years. He was also an administration member of several regional associations in the Gaspé region which promote development. He was also an active member of the Parti Québécois since 1990 and was a member of the NO coalition of Charlottetown Accord in 1992.

Lelièvre was first elected in Gaspé in 1994 and re-elected in 1998. He was named from 1999 to 2002 the parliamentary secretary to the Minister of natural resources. He was re-elected in 2003 and 2007 and served as the PQ critic for revenue, public security and information access. He did not seek re-election in 2008.

== Electoral record ==
2003 Quebec general election: Gaspé
Party	Candidate	Votes	%	±%
Parti Québécois	Guy Lelièvre	9,033	47.40	
Liberal	Johnny Gérard	8,052	42.26	
Action démocratique	Denis Paradis	1,743	9.15	
Green	Luc-Reno Fournier	227	1.19	–
Total valid votes		19,055	100.00	
Rejected and declined votes		167		
Turnout		19,222	68.72	
Electors on the lists		27,971		
