= Michel Le Moignan =

Canadian politician

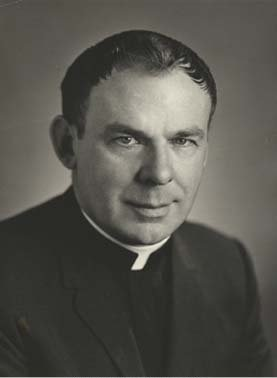

Member of the National Assembly of Quebec for Gaspé
- In office 1976–1981
- Preceded by: Guy Fortier
- Succeeded by: Henri Lemay

Personal details
- Born: November 7, 1919 Grande-Rivière, Quebec
- Died: December 21, 2000 (aged 81) Chandler, Quebec
- Party: Union Nationale

Michel Le Moignan (November 7, 1919 – December 21, 2000) was a Catholic priest and a Canadian politician from Quebec.

== Political career ==
Born in Grande-Rivière, Quebec, Le Moignan won a seat to the National Assembly of Quebec in the 1976 provincial election in the district of Gaspé as a member of the Union Nationale.

After party leader Rodrigue Biron left the party in 1980, Le Moignan became the Union Nationale's parliamentary leader for the remainder of the term. Roch La Salle, a Progressive Conservative Party of Canada Member of Parliament, led the party into the 1981 provincial election. The party was wiped out and Le Moignan finishing a distant third in his constituency.

Party political offices
Preceded by Rodrigue Biron	Leader of the Union Nationale (interim); 1980–1981	Succeeded by Roch La Salle
