= Nancy Charest =

Canadian politician

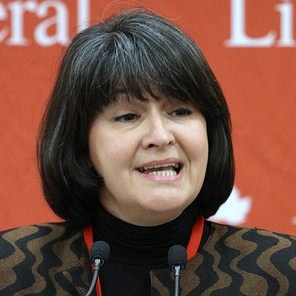
- Charest in 2011

Member of the National Assembly of Quebec for Matane
- In office April 14, 2003 – March 26, 2007
- Preceded by: Matthias Rioux
- Succeeded by: Pascal Bérubé

Personal details
- Born: November 28, 1959 Matane, Quebec, Canada
- Died: March 1, 2014 (aged 54) Matane, Quebec, Canada
- Party: Liberal
- Occupation: Lawyer

Nancy Charest (November 28, 1959 – March 1, 2014) was a Canadian politician. She represented the electoral district of Matane in the National Assembly of Quebec from 2003 to 2007 as a member of the Quebec Liberal Party. She was defeated by Pascal Bérubé of the Parti Québécois in the 2007 provincial election.

She ran as the Liberal Party of Canada's candidate for the district of Haute-Gaspésie—La Mitis—Matane—Matapédia in the 2008 federal election. She lost to Bloc Québécois incumbent Jean-Yves Roy, but received the highest vote percentage of any non-winning Liberal candidate in the province outside of the Montreal area.

Charest was found dead on March 1, 2014, along a road in her native Matane, Quebec. The cause of death was hypothermia, caused by exposure while Charest was heavily intoxicated. She was 54 years old.

== Electoral record ==
2003 Quebec general election: Matane
Party	Candidate	Votes	%
Liberal	Nancy Charest	7,602	40.84
Parti Québécois	Pascal Bérubé	7,569	40.67
Action démocratique	Raynald Bernier	3,005	16.14
Independent	Nelson Gauthier	178	0.96
Independent	Nestor Turcotte	135	0.73
Green	David Lejeune	124	0.67

2007 Quebec general election: Matane
Party	Candidate	Votes	%
Parti Québécois	Pascal Bérubé	7,830	39.10
Liberal	Nancy Charest	7,617	38.04
Action démocratique	Donald Grenier	3,980	19.88
Québec solidaire	Brigitte Michaud	358	1.79
Green	François Vincent	240	1.20

2008 Canadian federal election: Haute-Gaspésie—La Mitis—Matane—Matapédia
Party	Candidate	Votes	%	±%
Bloc Québécois	Jean-Yves Roy	11,977	37.5%	-8.5%
Liberal	Nancy Charest	11,368	35.6%	+22.5%
Conservative	Jérôme Landry	5,743	18.0%	-11.7%
New Democratic	Julie Demers	1,497	4.6%	-1.6%
Green	Louis Drainville	1,139	3.5%	+0.8%
Independent	Liliane Potvin	175	0.5%	-1.8%
Total valid votes		31,899		
Turnout		–	43.6%	
Bloc Québécois hold		Swing		-15.5

2011 Canadian federal election: Haute-Gaspésie—La Mitis—Matane—Matapédia
Party	Candidate	Votes	%	±%	Expenditures
Bloc Québécois	Jean-François Fortin	12,633	36.05	-1.48	
Liberal	Nancy Charest	8,964	25.58	-10.02	
New Democratic	Joanie Boulet	7,484	21.36	+16.67	
Conservative	Allen Cormier	5,253	14.99	-3.08	
Green	Louis Drainville	707	2.02	-1.55	
Total valid votes/Expense limit		35,041	100.00		
Total rejected ballots		393	1.11	+0.07	
Turnout		35,434	59.81	+5.43	
Eligible voters		59,242	–	–	
