= Louis-Félix Pinault =

Canadian politician

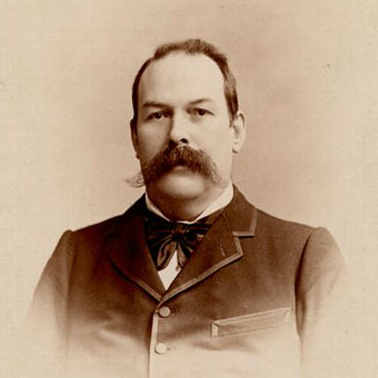

Member of the Legislative Assembly of Quebec for Matane
- In office 1890–1892
- Preceded by: District was created in 1890
- Succeeded by: Edmund James Flynn
- In office 1892–1898
- Preceded by: Edmund James Flynn
- Succeeded by: Donat Caron

Personal details
- Born: November 9, 1852 Rimouski, Canada East
- Died: December 10, 1906 (aged 54) Ottawa, Ontario, Canada
- Resting place: Notre-Dame Cemetery (Ottawa)
- Party: Liberal

Louis-Félix Pinault CMG (November 9, 1852 – December 10, 1906) was a lawyer and political figure in Quebec. He represented Matane in the Legislative Assembly of Quebec from 1890 to 1892 and from 1892 to 1898 as a Liberal.

He was born in Rimouski, Canada East, the son of Nicolas Pineau and Christine Lepage, and was educated at the Séminaire de Rimouski. Pinault was called to the Quebec bar in 1879 and practised law in Quebec City for 20 years. He was also vice-president of the Matane Railway Company. He was a major in Les Voltigeurs de Québec, served during the North-West Rebellion and then was promoted to colonel. He was defeated by Edmund James Flynn in the 1892 election, but Flynn had been elected in both Gaspé and Matane and, after Flynn chose to sit for Gaspé, Pinault was reelected in an 1892 by-election held in Matane. Pinault resigned his seat in 1898 after being named deputy minister in the federal Department of Militia. He was appointed CMG in the 1903 Birthday Honours. In 1905, he married Marie-Louise Lambert. Pinault died in Ottawa at the age of 54 and was buried in the Notre-Dame Cemetery.
