= Claire-Hélène Hovington =

Canadian politician

MNA for Matane
- In office 1985–1994
- Preceded by: Yves Bérubé
- Succeeded by: Matthias Rioux

Personal details
- Born: May 14, 1944 (age 81)
- Party: Liberal

Claire-Hélène Hovington (born May 14, 1944 in Sacré-Cœur, Quebec) is a Canadian politician, who represented the electoral district of Matane in the National Assembly of Quebec from 1985 to 1994 as a member of the Quebec Liberal Party.
