= Mont-Saint-Pierre =

- Village municipality
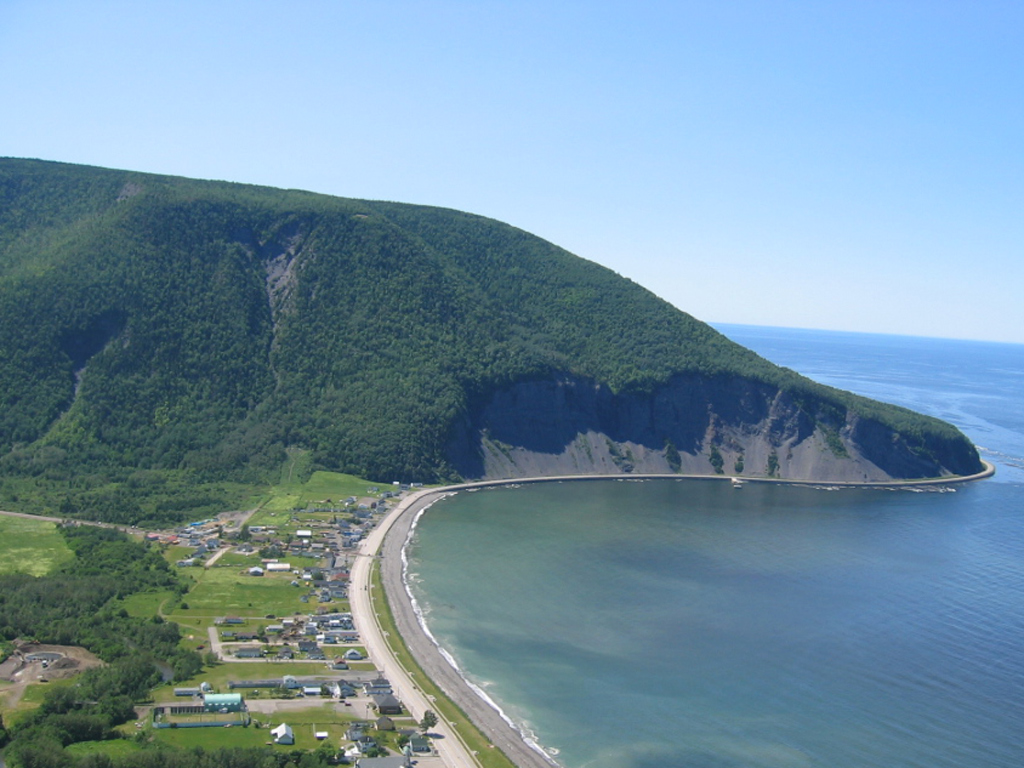

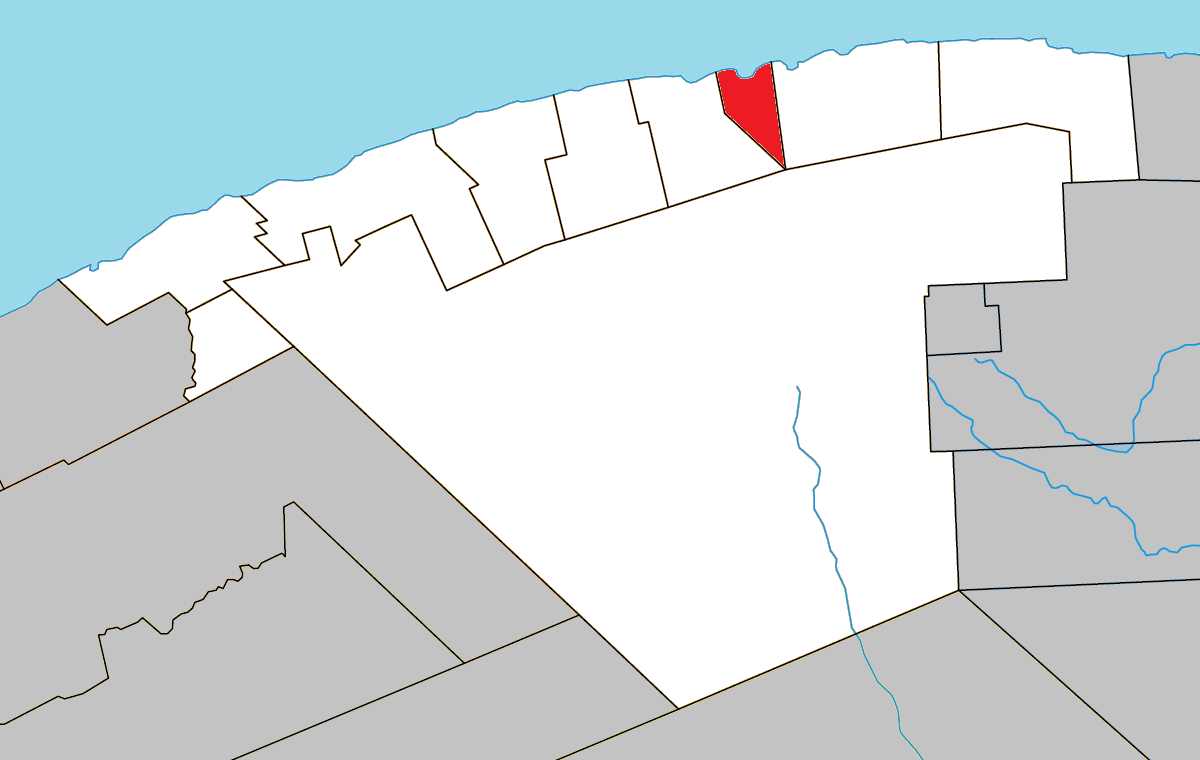
- Location within La Haute-Gaspésie RCM

- Location in eastern Quebec
- Coordinates: 49°13′21″N 65°48′26″W
- Country: Canada
- Province: Quebec
- Region: Gaspésie–Îles-de-la-Madeleine
- RCM: La Haute-Gaspésie
- Settled: 1858
- Constituted: January 1, 1947

Government
  - Mayor: Magella Emond
  - Federal riding: Gaspésie—Les Îles-de-la-Madeleine—Listuguj
  - Prov. riding: Gaspé

Area
  - Total: 51.78 km^{2} (19.99 sq mi)
  - Land: 52.07 km^{2} (20.10 sq mi)
- There is an apparent contradiction between two authoritative sources.

Population (2021)
  - Total: 186
  - Density: 3.6/km^{2} (9.3/sq mi)
  - Pop (2016-21): ▲20.0%
  - Dwellings: 133
- Time zone: UTC−5 (EST)
  - Summer (DST): UTC−4 (EDT)
- Postal code(s): G0E 1V0
- Area codes: 418 and 581
- Highways: R-132
- Website: www.mont-saint-pierre.ca/html

Mont-Saint-Pierre (French pronunciation: [mɔ̃ sɛ̃ pjɛʁ]) is a village municipality in Quebec, Canada, located in the regional county municipality of La Haute-Gaspésie in the administrative region of Gaspésie–Îles-de-la-Madeleine.

The village is located at the foot of the eponymous Mount Saint-Pierre. This 411 metres (1,348 ft) high mount juts into the Gulf of Saint Lawrence, separating Cove Mont-Louis from Cove Mont-Saint-Pierre, into which the Mont-Saint-Pierre River flows. The place was formerly called Rivière-à-Pierre.

The 2021 census there were 186 inhabitants.

Mont-Saint-Pierre is well known for hang-gliding and paragliding, and home to the Mont-Saint-Pierre Ecological Reserve. The Festival of Free Flight (Fête de Vol Libre) is held each year since 1978.

== History ==
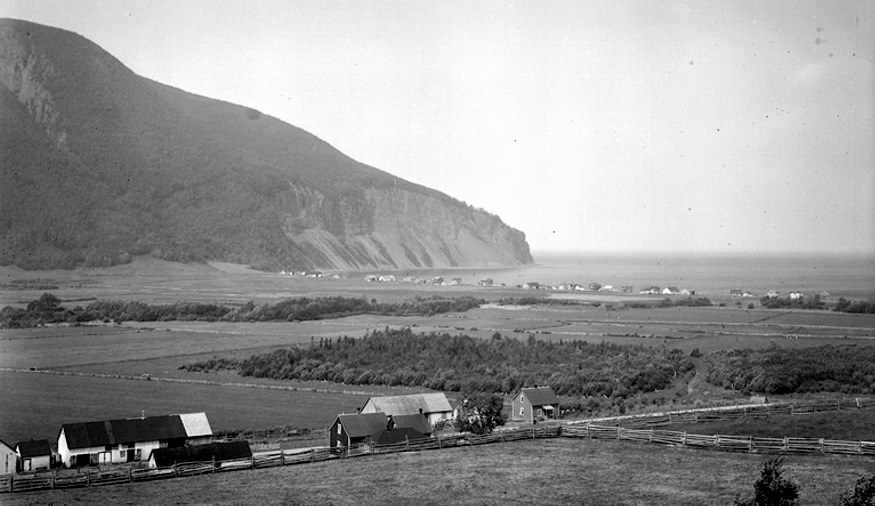
A farm in the valley of Mont-Saint-Pierre in 1944

Permanent settlement occurred in 1858. Its post office opened in 1904. In 1947, the village was incorporated when it separated from Mont-Louis.

== Demographics ==
In the 2021 Census of Population conducted by Statistics Canada, Mont-Saint-Pierre had a population of 186 living in 98 of its 133 total private dwellings, a change of 20% from its 2016 population of 155. With a land area of 52.07 km^{2} (20.10 sq mi), it had a population density of 3.6/km^{2} (9.3/sq mi) in 2021.

Canada census – Mont-Saint-Pierre community profile

| | 2021 | 2016 | 2011 |
| Population | 186 (+20.0% from 2016) | 155 (-19.3% from 2011) | 192 (-16.5% from 2006) |
| Land area | 52.07 km^{2} (20.10 sq mi) | 52.39 km^{2} (20.23 sq mi) | 53.20 km^{2} (20.54 sq mi) |
| Population density | 3.6/km^{2} (9.3/sq mi) | 3.0/km^{2} (7.8/sq mi) | 3.6/km^{2} (9.3/sq mi) |
| Median age | 61.6 (M: 60.8, F: 62.0) | 61.2 (M: 59.5, F: 61.7) | 58.2 (M: 56.0, F: 60.0) |
| Private dwellings | 133 (total) 98 (occupied) | 139 (total) | 130 (total) |
| Median household income | $.N/A | $36,160 | $.N/A |

Notes: Income data for this area has been suppressed for data quality or confidentiality reasons.
References: 2021 2016 2011

As of 2021, the population speaks almost exclusively French. The breakdown of mother tongues is:

- English as first language: 0%
- French as first language: 94.6%
- English and French as first language: 0%
- Other as first language: 2.7%

Historical Census Data - Mont-Saint-Pierre, Quebec

| Year | Pop. | ±% |
|---|---|---|
| 1951 | 371 | — |
| 1956 | 427 | +15.1% |
| 1961 | 428 | +0.2% |
| 1966 | 406 | −5.1% |
| 1971 | 371 | −8.6% |
| 1976 | 366 | −1.3% |
| 1981 | 351 | −4.1% |
| 1986 | 346 | −1.4% |

| Year | Pop. | ±% |
|---|---|---|
| 1991 | 273 | −21.1% |
| 1996 | 288 | +5.5% |
| 2001 | 239 | −17.0% |
| 2006 | 230 | −3.8% |
| 2011 | 192 | −16.5% |
| 2016 | 155 | −19.3% |
| 2021 | 186 | +20.0% |

Source: Statistics Canada

== See also ==
- List of village municipalities in Quebec
