= La Martre, Quebec =

La Martre
- Municipality
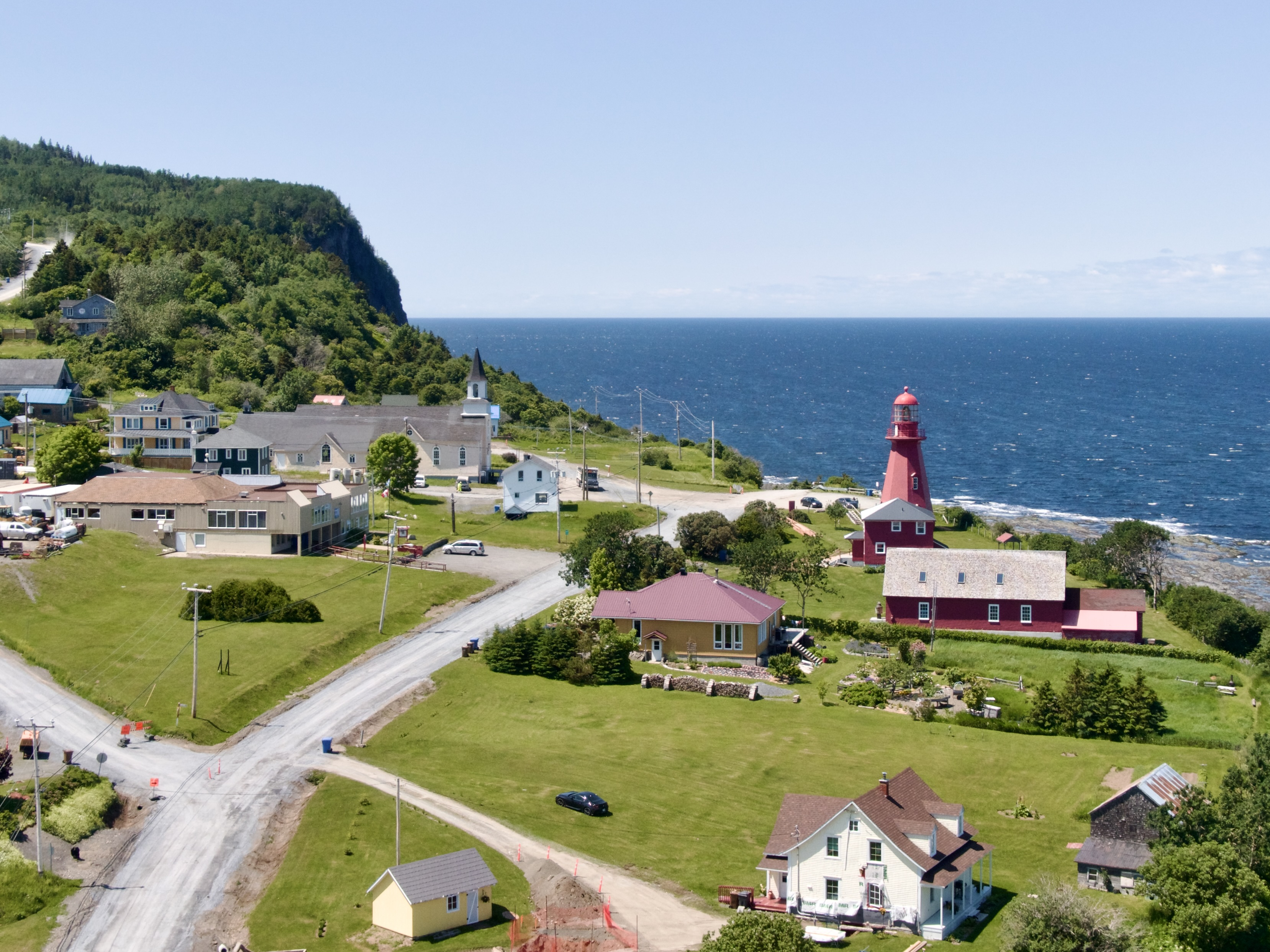
- La Martre lighthouse and village

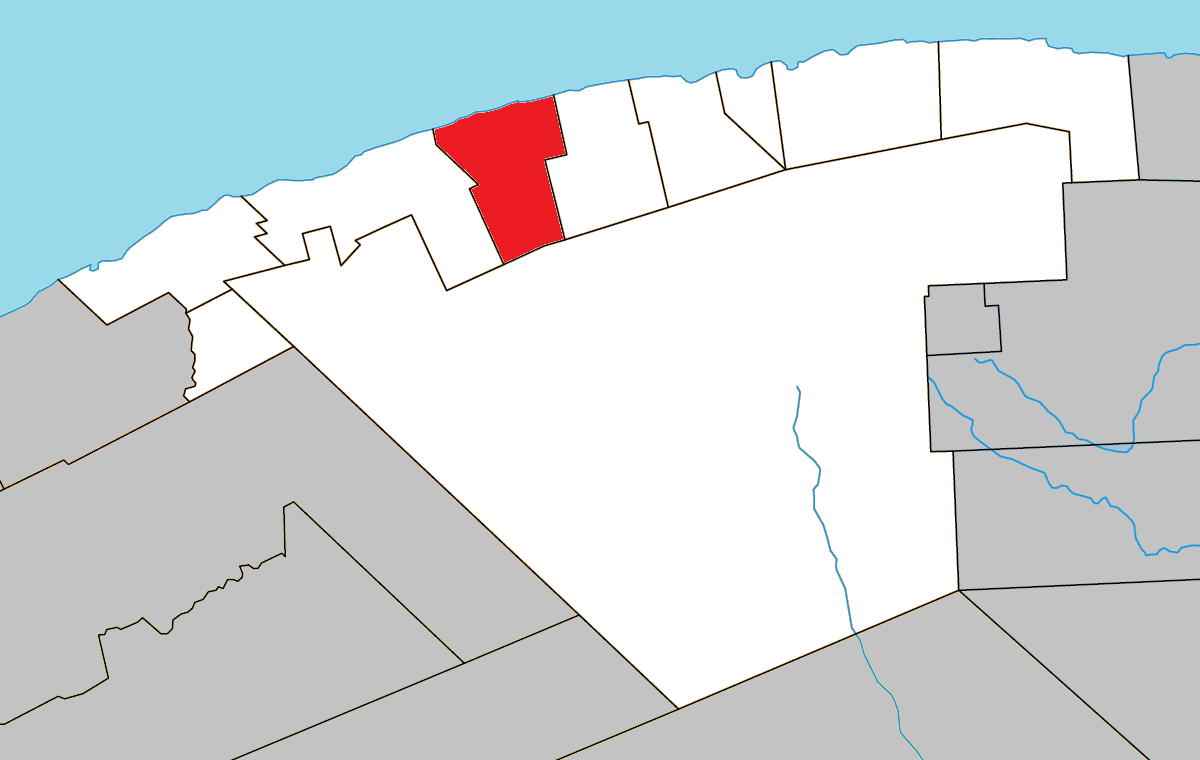
- Location within La Haute-Gaspésie RCM

- Location in eastern Quebec
- Coordinates: 49°10′N 66°10′W
- Country: Canada
- Province: Quebec
- Region: Gaspésie–Îles-de-la-Madeleine
- RCM: La Haute-Gaspésie
- Constituted: December 18, 1923

Government
  - Mayor: Yves Sohier
  - Federal riding: Gaspésie—Les Îles-de-la-Madeleine—Listuguj
  - Prov. riding: Gaspé

Area
  - Total: 179.11 km^{2} (69.15 sq mi)
  - Land: 175.23 km^{2} (67.66 sq mi)

Population (2021)
  - Total: 194
  - Density: 1.1/km^{2} (2.8/sq mi)
  - Pop (2016-21): ▼20.2%
  - Dwellings: 119
- Time zone: UTC−5 (EST)
  - Summer (DST): UTC−4 (EDT)
- Postal code(s): G0E 2H0
- Area codes: 418 and 581
- Highways: R-132
- Website: www.la-martre.ca

La Martre (French pronunciation: [la maʁtʁ]) is a municipality in the Gaspésie-Îles-de-la-Madeleine region of the province of Quebec in Canada.

In addition to La Martre itself, the municipality also includes the communities of Cap-au-Renard, Christie, and Sainte-Marthe-de-Gaspé.

== History ==
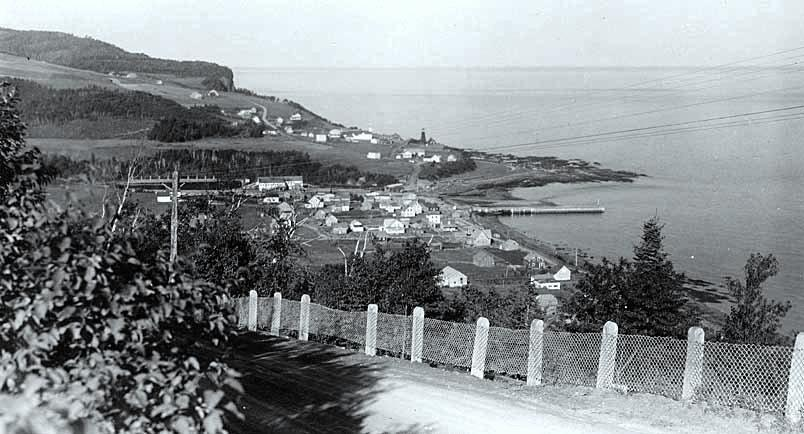
La Martre ca. 1935

The area saw permanent settlement in the late 19th century and was originally called Rivière-à-la-Marthe, after the Marten River (French: Rivière à la Marthe) that flows into the Gulf of Saint Lawrence there. The marten is found along this river's banks and is abundant in the Gaspé region.

In 1923, the place separated from the municipality of Sainte-Anne-des-Monts to form the Township Municipality of Christie, named in honour of Robert Christie. In 1950, the township municipality was split in two when Marsoui was incorporated as a village municipality.

In 1970, the municipality was renamed to La Martre.

== Demographics ==
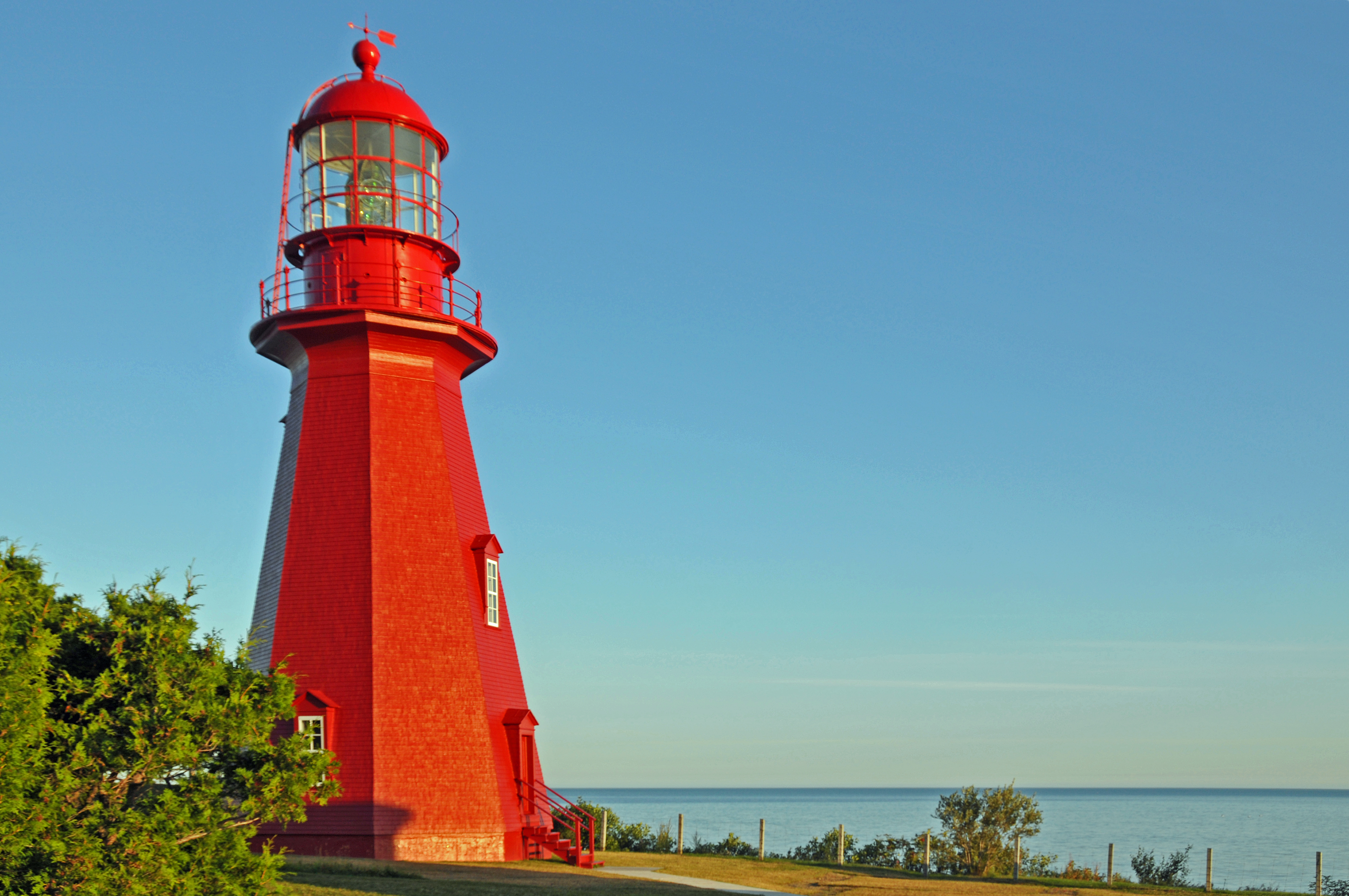
La Martre Lighthouse, built in 1906

In the 2021 Census of Population conducted by Statistics Canada, La Martre had a population of 194 living in 84 of its 119 total private dwellings, a change of −20.2% from its 2016 population of 243. With a land area of 175.23 km^{2} (67.66 sq mi), it had a population density of 1.1/km^{2} (2.9/sq mi) in 2021.

Canada census – La Martre community profile

	2021	2016	2011
Population	194 (-20.2% from 2016)	243 (-0.8% from 2011)	245 (-3.2% from 2006)
Land area	175.23 km^{2} (67.66 sq mi)	175.46 km^{2} (67.75 sq mi)	173.24 km^{2} (66.89 sq mi)
Population density	1.1/km^{2} (2.8/sq mi)	1.4/km^{2} (3.6/sq mi)	1.4/km^{2} (3.6/sq mi)
Median age	55.2 (M: 57.2, F: 48.0)	52.1 (M: 51.8, F: 53.0)	50.2 (M: 50.2, F: 50.2)
Private dwellings	119 (total) 84 (occupied)	147 (total) 99 (occupied)	184 (total)
Median household income	$.N/A	$45,184	$.N/A

Notes: 2021 and 2011 income data for this area has been suppressed for data quality or confidentiality reasons.
References: 2021 2016 2011

Historical Census Data - La Martre, Quebec

Year	Pop.	±%
1931	519	—
1941	966	+86.1%
1951	736	−23.8%
1956	779	+5.8%
1961	652	−16.3%
1966	565	−13.3%

Year	Pop.	±%
1971	471	−16.6%
1976	430	−8.7%
1981	376	−12.6%
1986	383	+1.9%
1991	336	−12.3%
1996	315	−6.2%

Year	Pop.	±%
2001	266	−15.6%
2006	253	−4.9%
2011	245	−3.2%
2016	243	−0.8%
2021	194	−20.2%

Population counts are not adjusted for boundary changes.
Source: Statistics Canada

== Government ==
List of former mayors:

- Louis Roy (1924–1926)
- Pierre Maloney (1926–1937)
- Roger L'Italien (1937–1939, 1949–1953)
- Willie Gagnon (1939–1945, 1947–1949)
- Marcellin Campion (1945–1947)
- Gérard Gagnon (1953–1957, 1958–1959)
- Damase Morin (1957–1958)
- Maurice Gasse (1959–1965)
- Grégoire Gasse (1965–1971)
- Jean-Yves Gagnon (1971–1973, 1980–1989)
- Ovilla Vallée (1973–1976, 1977–1980)
- Noël Vallée (1976–1977)
- Albert Robinson (1980)
- Jean-Guy Vallée (1989–1990)
- Fernand Hanley (1990–1992)
- Raymond St-Pierre (1992–1996, 2005–2009)
- Théodule Dion (1996–1999)
- Harold Gagnon (1999–2005)
- Claudette Robinson (2009–2013)
- Michel Laperle (2013–2014)
- Yves Sohier (2014–present)

== Gallery ==
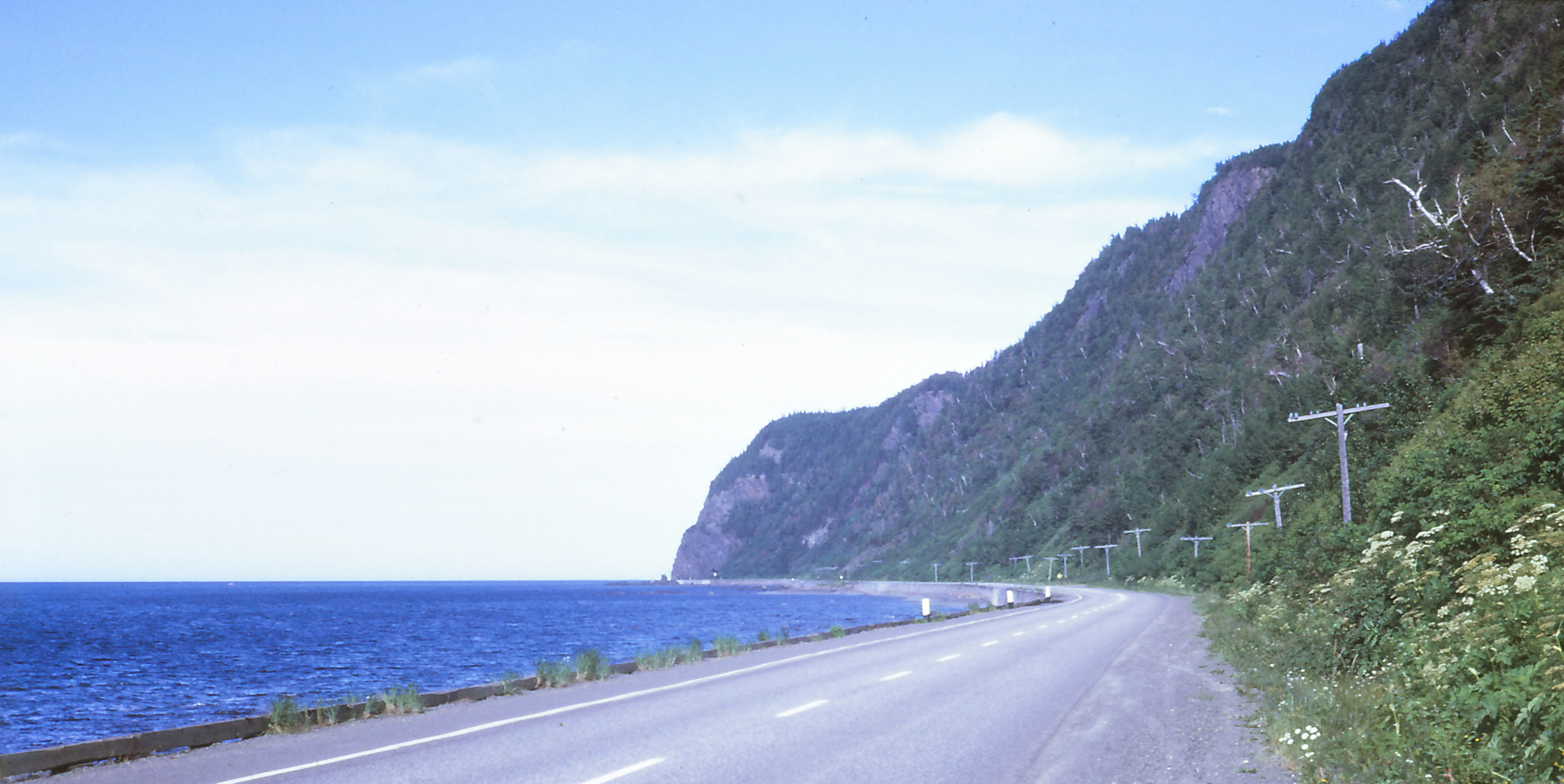
Cap-au-Renard

== See also ==
- List of municipalities in Quebec
