= Coulée-des-Adolphe =

- Unorganized territory
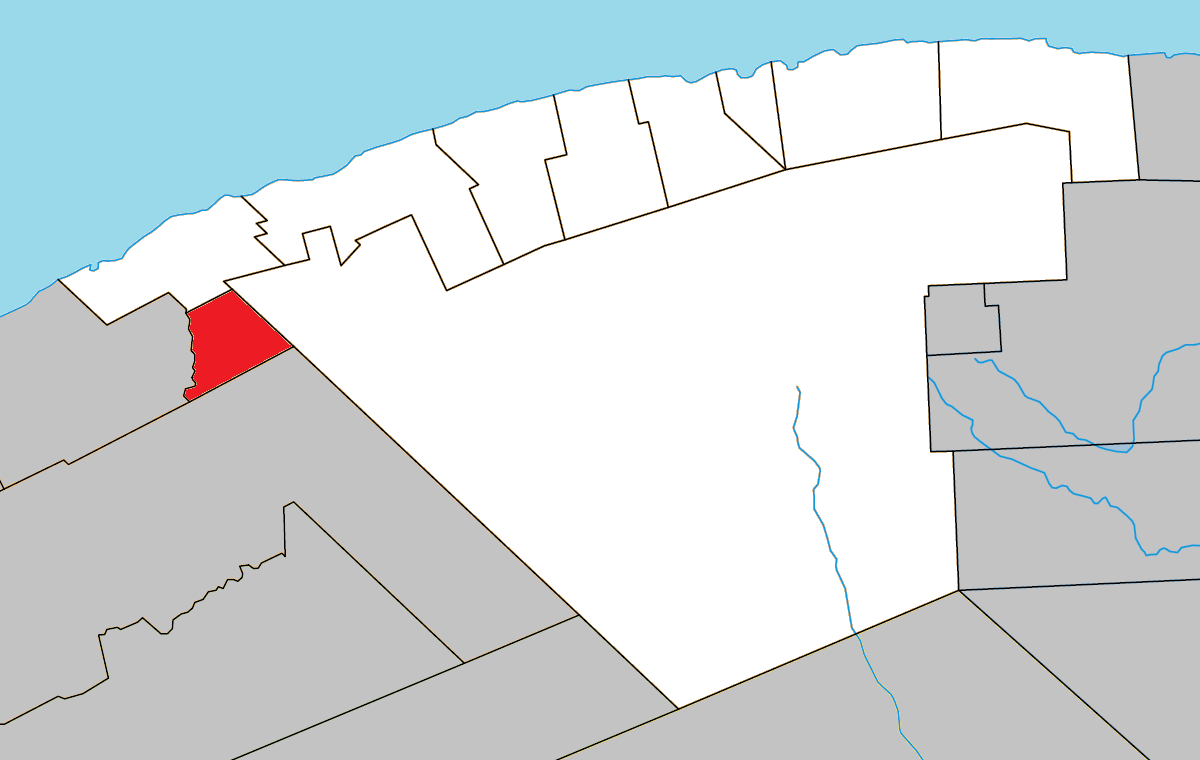
- Location within La Haute-Gaspésie RCM

- Location in eastern Quebec
- Coordinates: 48°58′N 66°39′W
- Country: Canada
- Province: Quebec
- Region: Gaspésie–Îles-de-la-Madeleine
- RCM: La Haute-Gaspésie
- Constituted: January 1, 1986

Government
  - Federal riding: Gaspésie—Les Îles-de-la-Madeleine—Listuguj
  - Prov. riding: Gaspé

Area
  - Total: 87.76 km^{2} (33.88 sq mi)
  - Land: 86.20 km^{2} (33.28 sq mi)

Population (2021)
  - Total: 0
  - Density: 0/km^{2} (0/sq mi)
  - Pop (2016-21): 0.0%
  - Dwellings: 1
- Time zone: UTC−05:00 (EST)
  - Summer (DST): UTC−04:00 (EDT)
- Highways: No major routes

Coulée-des-Adolphe (French pronunciation: [kule dez‿adɔlf]) is an unorganized territory in the Gaspésie–Îles-de-la-Madeleine region of Quebec, Canada.

It is named after a small ravine found in the centre of the territory (coulée is an archaic French word meaning "small canal" or "channel"). The ravine is formed by the Adolphe Creek, a tributary of the Little Cap-Chat River, that was named in honour of Adolphe Gagnon or one of the sons of this former inhabitant. The creek is only 2.5 kilometres (1.6 mi) long and drops from an elevation of 250 metres (820 ft) off the Appalachian plateau to less than 100 metres (330 ft).

== Demographics ==
Historical Census Data - Coulée-des-Adolphe, Quebec

Year	Pop.
1991	0
1996	0
2001	0
2006	0

Year	Pop.
2011	0
2016	0
2021	0

Source: Statistics Canada

== See also ==
- List of unorganized territories in Quebec
