= Sainte-Madeleine-de-la-Rivière-Madeleine =

- Municipality
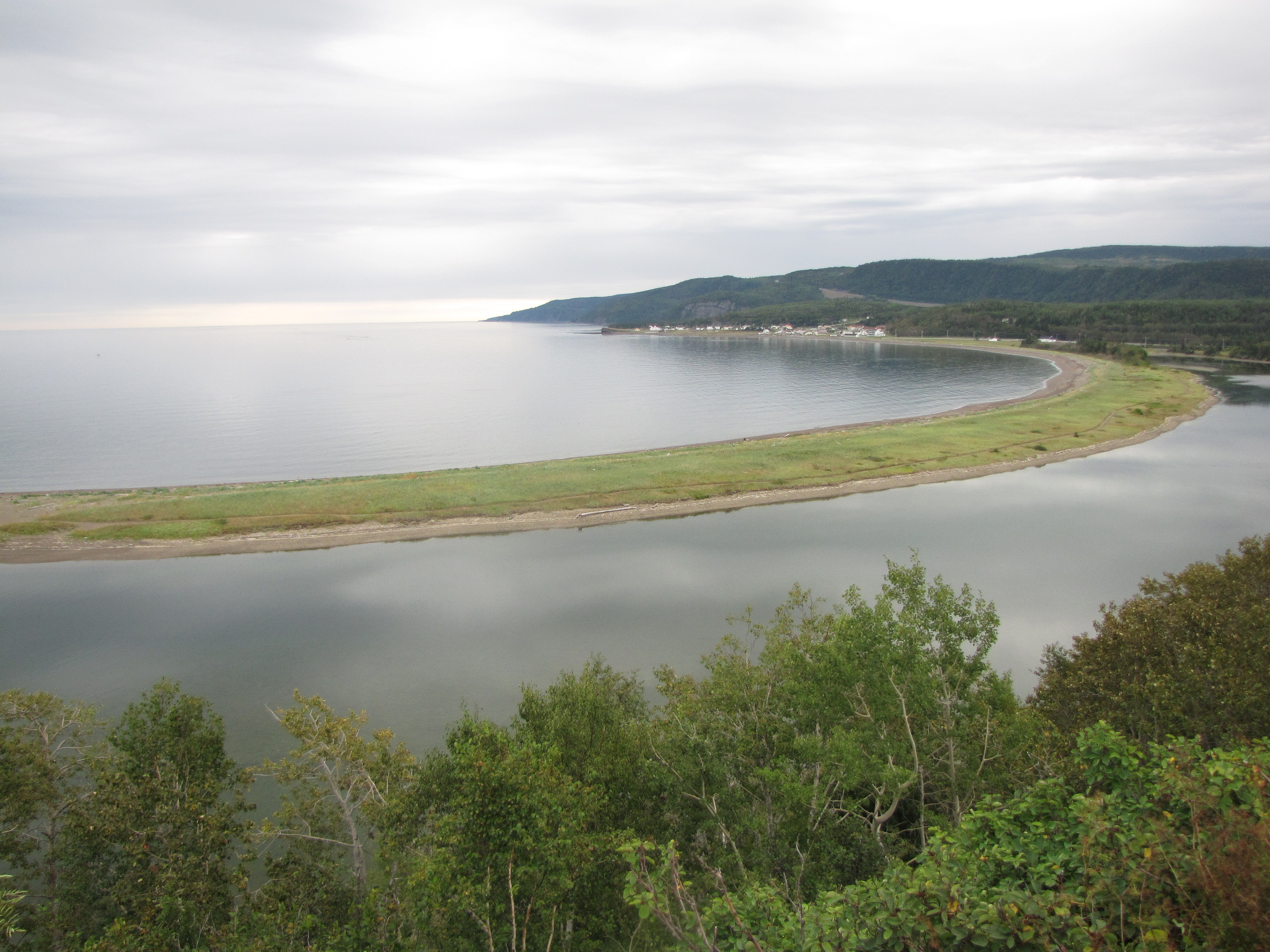
- View from the lighthouse of Sainte-Madeleine-de-la-Rivière-Madeleine

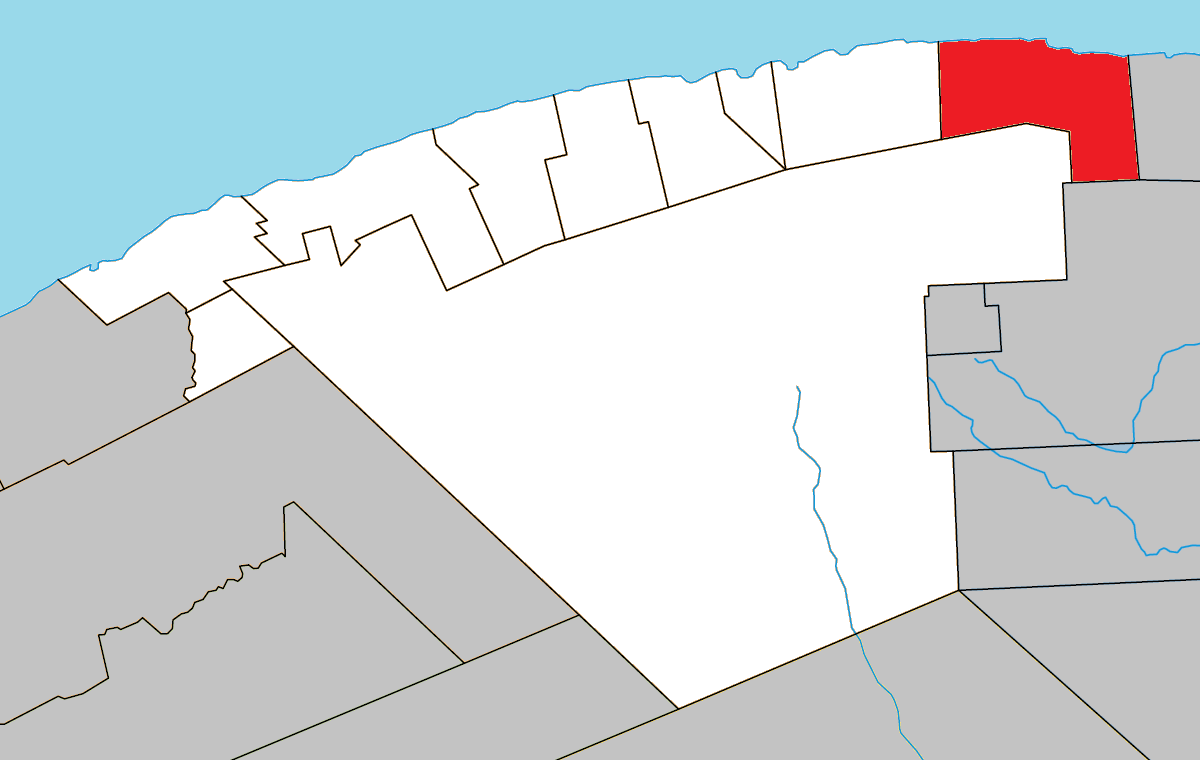
- Location within La Haute-Gaspésie RCM

- Location in eastern Quebec
- Coordinates: 49°14′N 65°18′W
- Country: Canada
- Province: Quebec
- Region: Gaspésie–Îles-de-la-Madeleine
- RCM: La Haute-Gaspésie
- Constituted: February 27, 1915

Government
  - Mayor: Joël Côté
  - Federal riding: Gaspésie—Les Îles-de-la-Madeleine—Listuguj
  - Prov. riding: Gaspé

Area
  - Total: 264.92 km^{2} (102.29 sq mi)
  - Land: 262.35 km^{2} (101.29 sq mi)

Population (2021)
  - Total: 289
  - Density: 1.1/km^{2} (2.8/sq mi)
  - Pop 2011-2016: 0%
  - Dwellings: 224
- Time zone: UTC−5 (EST)
  - Summer (DST): UTC−4 (EDT)
- Postal code(s): G0E 1P0
- Area codes: 418 and 581
- Highways: R-132
- Website: stemadeleine.ca

Sainte-Madeleine-de-la-Rivière-Madeleine (French pronunciation: [sɛ̃t madlɛn də la ʁivjɛʁ madlɛn]) is a municipality in the Gaspésie-Îles-de-la-Madeleine region of the province of Quebec in Canada. It has the longest municipal name in Quebec.

The municipality includes the communities of Madeleine-Centre, Manche-d'Épée, and Rivière-la-Madeleine.

The community of Manche-d'Épée is home to the Manche-d'Épée Ecological Reserve.

== History ==
The Seignory of the Rivière-de-la-Madeleine was first granted to Antoine Caddé in 1679, then to Denis Riverin in 1689, taking its name from the Madeleine River which flows its territory. The toponym could refer to Jacques de La Ferté de La Madeleine, the first missionary of the place who, however, never went to Canada or the Gaspé region.

In 1874, the Parish of Sainte-Marie-Madeleine was founded and the local post office opened in 1889 under the name Petite-Magdeleine. In 1916, the place was incorporated as the Municipality of Sainte-Madeleine-de-la-Rivière-Madeleine.

== Climate ==
Climate data for Sainte-Madeleine-de-la-Rivière-Madeleine (1991−2020 normals, extremes 1939–2020)
Month	Jan	Feb	Mar	Apr	May	Jun	Jul	Aug	Sep	Oct	Nov	Dec	Year
Record high °C (°F)	15.4 (59.7)	15.6 (60.1)	21.4 (70.5)	29.0 (84.2)	29.5 (85.1)	33.3 (91.9)	34.0 (93.2)	32.8 (91.0)	32.1 (89.8)	27.2 (81.0)	24.6 (76.3)	21.1 (70.0)	34.0 (93.2)
Mean daily maximum °C (°F)	−5.9 (21.4)	−5.6 (21.9)	−0.9 (30.4)	5.2 (41.4)	11.6 (52.9)	17.1 (62.8)	20.3 (68.5)	19.7 (67.5)	15.9 (60.6)	9.5 (49.1)	4.0 (39.2)	−1.7 (28.9)	7.4 (45.3)
Daily mean °C (°F)	−9.6 (14.7)	−9.4 (15.1)	−4.5 (23.9)	1.8 (35.2)	7.7 (45.9)	13.0 (55.4)	16.6 (61.9)	16.2 (61.2)	12.3 (54.1)	6.4 (43.5)	1.1 (34.0)	−4.8 (23.4)	3.9 (39.0)
Mean daily minimum °C (°F)	−13.4 (7.9)	−13.1 (8.4)	−8.1 (17.4)	−1.6 (29.1)	3.8 (38.8)	9.0 (48.2)	12.9 (55.2)	12.7 (54.9)	8.5 (47.3)	3.4 (38.1)	−1.8 (28.8)	−7.8 (18.0)	0.4 (32.7)
Record low °C (°F)	−31.1 (−24.0)	−30.0 (−22.0)	−25.0 (−13.0)	−18.0 (−0.4)	−8.3 (17.1)	−0.6 (30.9)	4.0 (39.2)	3.3 (37.9)	−2.2 (28.0)	−9.5 (14.9)	−20.5 (−4.9)	−27.2 (−17.0)	−31.1 (−24.0)
Average precipitation mm (inches)	56.9 (2.24)	45.3 (1.78)	64.0 (2.52)	56.6 (2.23)	59.6 (2.35)	69.8 (2.75)	79.8 (3.14)	81.3 (3.20)	62.9 (2.48)	72.4 (2.85)	62.4 (2.46)	85.3 (3.36)	796.2 (31.35)
Average rainfall mm (inches)	5.8 (0.23)	1.8 (0.07)	6.7 (0.26)	30.2 (1.19)	58.2 (2.29)	69.8 (2.75)	79.8 (3.14)	81.3 (3.20)	62.9 (2.48)	70.0 (2.76)	29.5 (1.16)	16.4 (0.65)	512.2 (20.17)
Average snowfall cm (inches)	51.1 (20.1)	43.5 (17.1)	57.3 (22.6)	26.4 (10.4)	1.4 (0.6)	0.0 (0.0)	0.0 (0.0)	0.0 (0.0)	0.0 (0.0)	2.4 (0.9)	33.0 (13.0)	68.9 (27.1)	284.0 (111.8)
Average precipitation days (≥ 0.2 mm)	10.3	8.2	9.0	11.0	12.1	12.3	12.3	12.6	12.3	13.4	10.2	13.0	136.6
Average rainy days (≥ 0.2 mm)	1.2	0.61	1.8	7.2	12.0	12.3	12.3	12.6	12.3	13.0	6.0	2.2	93.4
Average snowy days (≥ 0.2 cm)	9.5	7.7	7.5	4.3	0.29	0.0	0.0	0.0	0.0	0.52	5.0	11.4	46.2
Average relative humidity (%) (at 15:00 LST)	73.9	73.7	71.8	69.6	71.4	72.1	75.4	75.7	75.0	74.6	73.7	75.9	73.6
Source: Environment and Climate Change Canada (precipitation/rainfall/snow 1971–2000)

== Demographics ==
=== Population ===
Canada census – Sainte-Madeleine-de-la-Rivière-Madeleine community profile

	2021	2016	2011
Population	289 (0%% from 2016)	289 (-13.5% from 2011)	334 (-10.5% from 2006)
Land area	262.35 km^{2} (101.29 sq mi)	263.34 km^{2} (101.68 sq mi)	262.42 km^{2} (101.32 sq mi)
Population density	1.1/km^{2} (2.8/sq mi)	1.1/km^{2} (2.8/sq mi)	1.3/km^{2} (3.4/sq mi)
Median age	66.0 (M: 66.5, F: 66.0)	62.4 (M: 62.9, F: 61.7)	58.6 (M: 58.5, F: 58.8)
Private dwellings	224 (total) 161 (occupied)	281 (total)	298 (total)
Median household income	$40,800	$35,072	$29,118

References: 2021 2016 2011

Historical Census Data - Sainte-Madeleine-de-la-Rivière-Madeleine, Quebec

Year	Pop.	±%
1921	605	—
1931	674	+11.4%
1941	713	+5.8%
1951	726	+1.8%
1956	826	+13.8%
1961	918	+11.1%

Year	Pop.	±%
1966	777	−15.4%
1971	771	−0.8%
1976	773	+0.3%
1981	706	−8.7%
1986	622	−11.9%
1991	544	−12.5%

Year	Pop.	±%
1996	482	−11.4%
2001	425	−11.8%
2006	373	−12.2%
2011	334	−10.5%
2016	289	−13.5%
2021	289	+0.0%

Source: Statistics Canada

=== Language ===
Canada Census Mother Tongue – Sainte-Madeleine-de-la-Rivière-Madeleine, Quebec
Census	Total	French			English			French & English			Other		
Year	Responses	Count	Trend	Pop %	Count	Trend	Pop %	Count	Trend	Pop %	Count	Trend	Pop %
2021	290	285	▲1.8%	98.3%	5	▲ n/a%	1.7%	0	0.0%	0.0%	0	0.0%	0.0%
2016	290	280	▼16.4%	96.6%	0	▼100.0%	0.0%	0	0.0%	0.0%	0	0.0%	0.0%
2011	330	335	▼6.9%	101.5%	5	▲ n/a%	1.5%	0	0.0%	0.0%	0	0.0%	0.0%
2006	360	360	▼12.2%	100.0%	0	0.0%	0.0%	0	0.0%	0.0%	0	0.0%	0.0%
2001	415	410	▼14.6%	98.8%	0	0.0%	0.0%	0	0.0%	0.0%	0	0.0%	0.0%
1996	480	480	n/a	100.0%	0	n/a	0.0%	0	n/a	0.0%	0	n/a	0.0%

== See also ==
- List of municipalities in Quebec
