= Marsoui =

- Village municipality
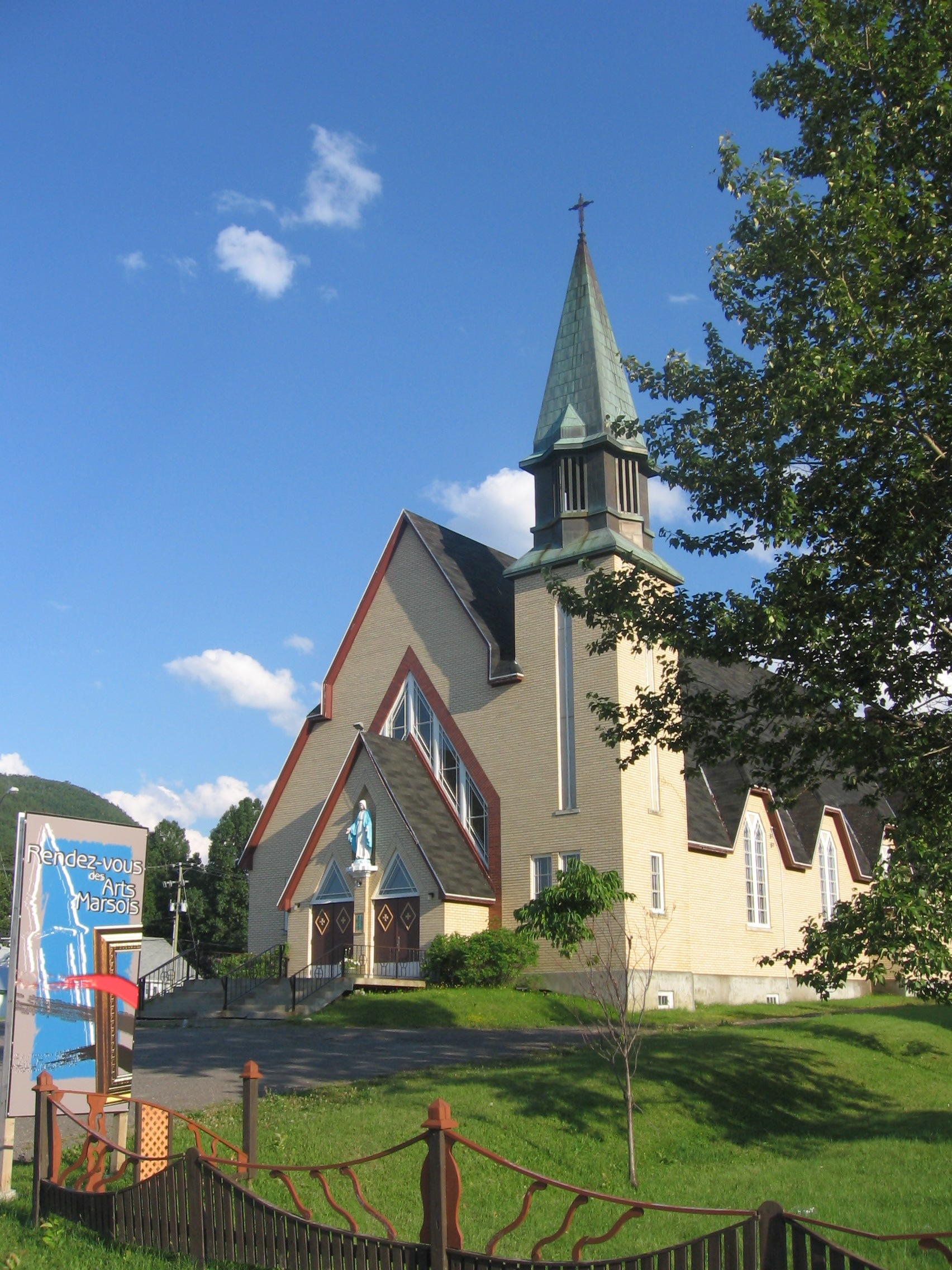
- Church in Marsoui

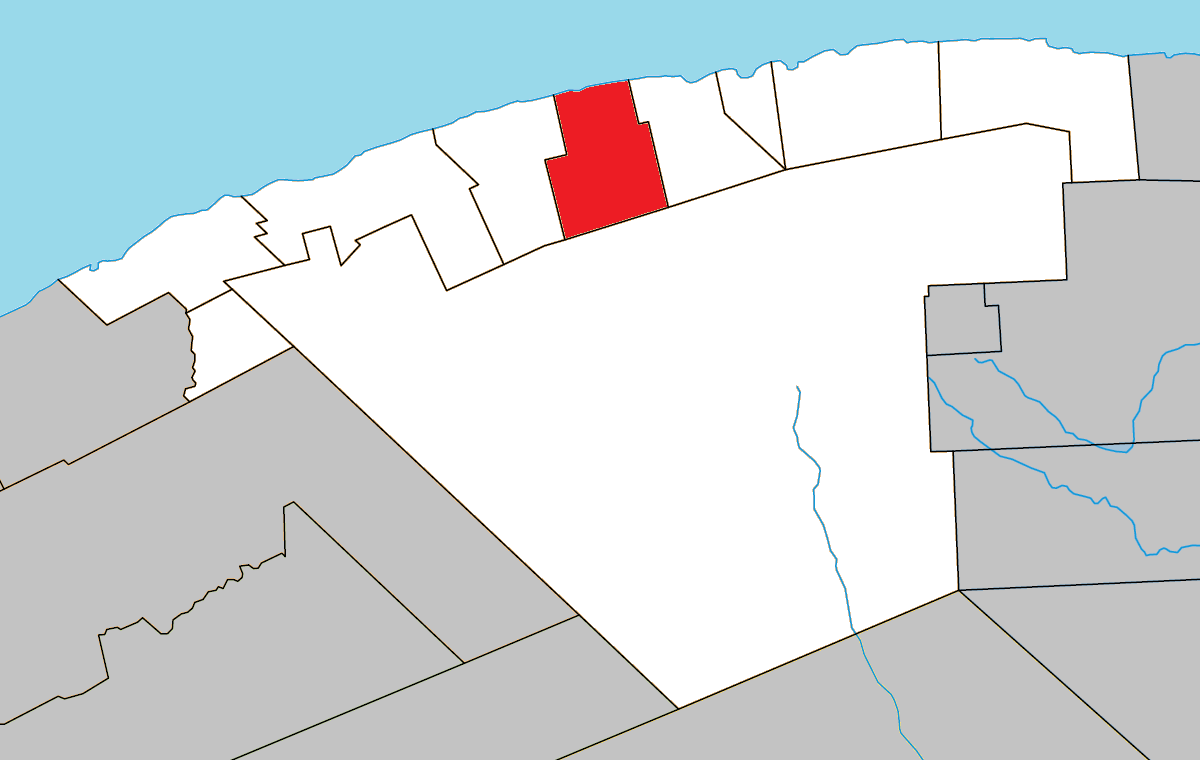
- Location within La Haute-Gaspésie RCM

- Location in eastern Quebec
- Coordinates: 49°13′N 66°04′W
- Country: Canada
- Province: Quebec
- Region: Gaspésie–Îles-de-la-Madeleine
- RCM: La Haute-Gaspésie
- Settled: 1830s
- Constituted: January 1, 1950

Government
  - Mayor: Renée Gasse
  - Federal riding: Gaspésie—Les Îles-de-la-Madeleine—Listuguj
  - Prov. riding: Gaspé

Area
  - Total: 178.64 km^{2} (68.97 sq mi)
  - Land: 181.40 km^{2} (70.04 sq mi)
- There is an apparent contradiction between two authoritative sources

Population (2021)
  - Total: 289
  - Density: 1.6/km^{2} (4.1/sq mi)
  - Pop (2016-21): ▲5.1%
  - Dwellings: 179
- Time zone: UTC−5 (EST)
  - Summer (DST): UTC−4 (EDT)
- Postal code(s): G0E 1S0
- Area codes: 418 and 581
- Highways: R-132
- Website: municipalites-du-quebec.com/marsoui/

Marsoui (French pronunciation: [maʁswi]) is a village municipality in the Gaspésie–Îles-de-la-Madeleine region of Quebec, Canada.

The name Marsoui is thought to originate from the Mi'kmaq word malseoui, meaning "flint" which is abundant in the area. However, another theory explains that it comes from the French word marsouin, the vernacular term for porpoise or beluga whale that used to be present in the Gulf of Saint Lawrence in large numbers. Alternate spellings used over time were Marsouis, Marsoin, and Marsouins.

== History ==
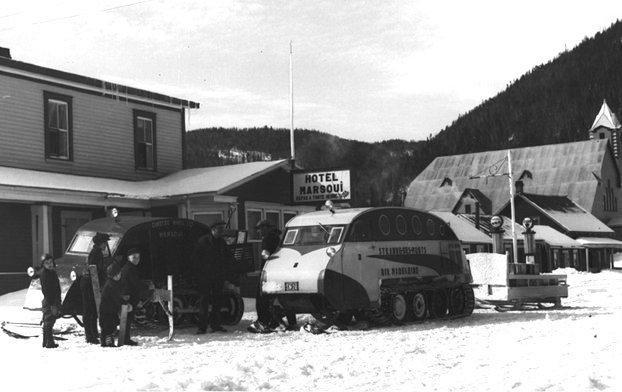
Two snowcats in front of Marsoui Hotel ca. 1949

While the beluga hunt and cod fishing was popular in this area during the late 17th century, it was not until 1836 that the first permanent settlers, the Henley family of Mont-Louis, arrived. They were followed by people from Jersey.

In 1890, the Mission of Sainte-Émélie-de-Marsoui was founded there, and 3 years later, the local post office opened. Subsistence fishing was the main economic activity until 1911. Then a small saw mill was built that started the transformation to a forestry-based economy. Over the following decades, several saw mills burnt down and were rebuilt.

During the Prohibition era in the United States, Marsoui was a favorite hideout for smugglers fleeing the Royal Canadian Mounted Police.

In 1923, the villages of Marsoui and Rivière-à-la-Marthe separated from the municipality of Sainte-Anne-des-Monts to form the Township Municipality of Christie. In turn, Marsoui separated from this township in 1950 to be incorporated as a village municipality. Its first mayor was Alphonse Couturier, whose company had built a large saw mill in Marsoui in 1940.

From 1945 to 1954, a lead and zinc mine operated about 21 kilometres (13 mi) southwest of Marsoui.

== Demographics ==
=== Population ===
In the 2021 Census of Population conducted by Statistics Canada, Marsoui had a population of 289 living in 149 of its 179 total private dwellings, a change of 5.1% from its 2016 population of 275. With a land area of 181.4 km^{2} (70.0 sq mi), it had a population density of 1.6/km^{2} (4.1/sq mi) in 2021.

Canada census – Marsoui community profile

| | 2021 | 2016 | 2011 |
| Population | 289 (+5.1% from 2016) | 275 (-11.0% from 2011) | 309 (-9.4% from 2006) |
| Land area | 181.40 km^{2} (70.04 sq mi) | 181.75 km^{2} (70.17 sq mi) | 183.63 km^{2} (70.90 sq mi) |
| Population density | 1.6/km^{2} (4.1/sq mi) | 1.5/km^{2} (3.9/sq mi) | 1.7/km^{2} (4.4/sq mi) |
| Median age | 62.4 (M: 61.2, F: 62.8) | 57.2 (M: 56.2, F: 57.7) | 55.2 (M: 55.1, F: 55.3) |
| Private dwellings | 179 (total) 149 (occupied) | 182 (total) | 177 (total) |
| Median household income | $50,400 | $48,768 | $55,296 |

References: 2021 2016 2011

Historical Census Data - Marsoui, Quebec

| Year | Pop. | ±% |
|---|---|---|
| 1951 | 621 | — |
| 1956 | 710 | +14.3% |
| 1961 | 724 | +2.0% |
| 1966 | 656 | −9.4% |
| 1971 | 600 | −8.5% |
| 1976 | 541 | −9.8% |
| 1981 | 529 | −2.2% |
| 1986 | 523 | −1.1% |

| Year | Pop. | ±% |
|---|---|---|
| 1991 | 475 | −9.2% |
| 1996 | 440 | −7.4% |
| 2001 | 373 | −15.2% |
| 2006 | 341 | −8.6% |
| 2011 | 309 | −9.4% |
| 2016 | 275 | −11.0% |
| 2021 | 289 | +5.1% |

Source: Statistics Canada

=== Language ===
Canada Census Mother Tongue – Marsoui, Quebec
| Census | Total | French | | | English | | | French & English | | | Other | | |
| Year | Responses | Count | Trend | Pop % | Count | Trend | Pop % | Count | Trend | Pop % | Count | Trend | Pop % |
| 2021 | 285 | 285 | ▲5.6% | 100.0% | 0 | 0.0% | 0.0% | 0 | 0.0% | 0.0% | 0 | ▼100.0% | 0.0% |
| 2016 | 275 | 270 | ▼11.5% | 98.2% | 0 | 0.0% | 0.0% | 0 | 0.0% | 0.0% | 5 | ▲ n/a% | 1.8% |
| 2011 | 310 | 305 | ▼10.3% | 98.4% | 0 | 0.0% | 0.0% | 0 | 0.0% | 0.0% | 0 | 0.0% | 0.0% |
| 2006 | 340 | 340 | ▼8.1% | 100.0% | 0 | 0.0% | 0.0% | 0 | 0.0% | 0.0% | 0 | 0.0% | 0.0% |
| 2001 | 370 | 370 | ▼14.9% | 100.0% | 0 | ▼100.0% | 0.0% | 0 | 0.0% | 0.0% | 0 | 0.0% | 0.0% |
| 1996 | 445 | 435 | n/a | 97.8% | 10 | n/a | 2.2% | 0 | n/a | 0.0% | 0 | n/a | 0.0% |

== Economy ==
The primary industry of Marsoui is forestry. The Bois Marsoui GDS mill supports 60% of its population. There is also a small tourism industry, including 2 commercial sugar houses. Other businesses provide local commercial and public services.

== Government ==
List of former mayors:

- Alphonse Couturier (1950–1961)
- Oscar Couturier (1961–1971)
- Daniel Goupil (1971–1973)
- Ghislain Deschênes (1973–2001, 2003–2005, 2017–2021)
- Clément Gagné (2001–2003)
- Jovette Gasse (2005–2013)
- Dario Jean (2013–2017)
- Renée Gasse (2021–present)

== See also ==
- List of village municipalities in Quebec
