= Rivière-à-Claude =

- Municipality
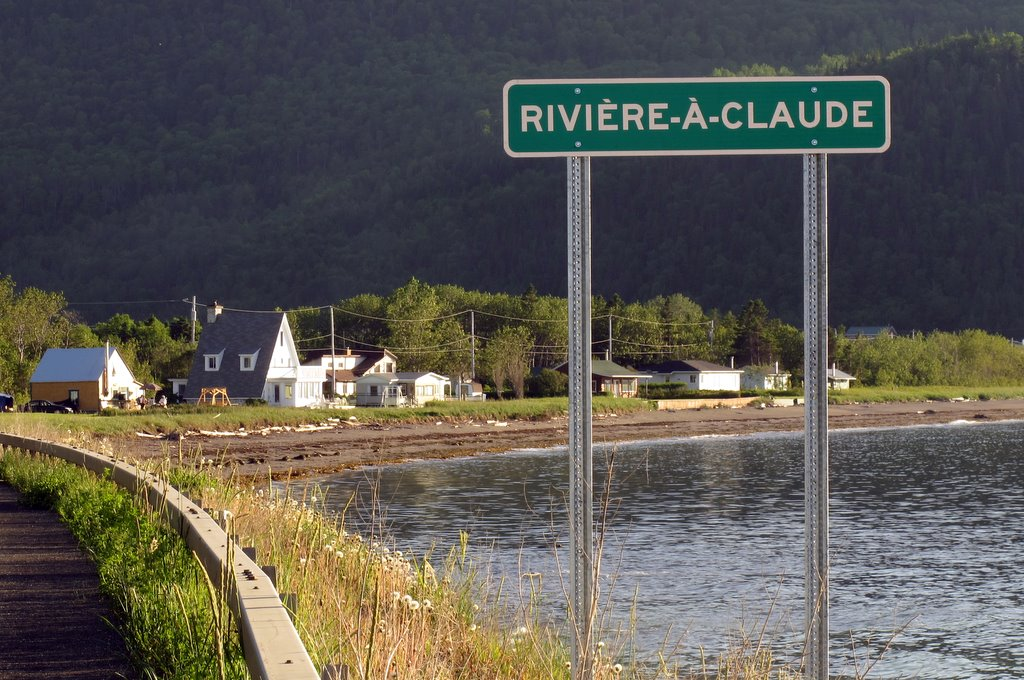

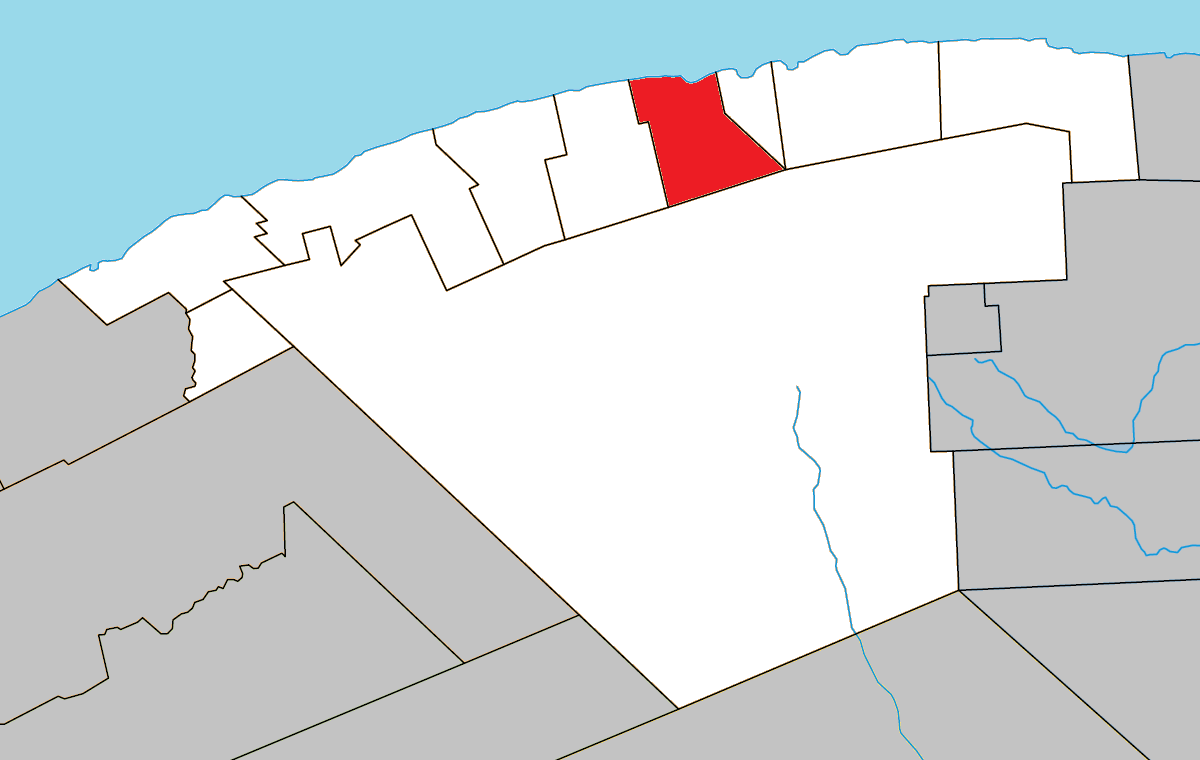
- Location within La Haute-Gaspésie RCM

- Location in eastern Quebec
- Coordinates: 49°13′N 65°54′W
- Country: Canada
- Province: Quebec
- Region: Gaspésie–Îles-de-la-Madeleine
- RCM: La Haute-Gaspésie
- Settled: 1860
- Constituted: December 18, 1923

Government
  - Mayor: Réjean Normand
  - Federal riding: Gaspésie—Les Îles-de-la-Madeleine—Listuguj
  - Prov. riding: Gaspé

Area
  - Total: 156.17 km^{2} (60.30 sq mi)
  - Land: 155.95 km^{2} (60.21 sq mi)

Population (2021)
  - Total: 141
  - Density: 0.9/km^{2} (2.3/sq mi)
  - Dwellings: 113
- Time zone: UTC−5 (EST)
  - Summer (DST): UTC−4 (EDT)
- Postal code(s): G0E 1Z0
- Area codes: 418 and 581
- Highways: R-132
- Website: municipalites-du-quebec.ca/riviere-a-claude/

Rivière-à-Claude (French pronunciation: [ʁivjɛʁ a klod]) is a municipality in the Gaspésie-Îles-de-la-Madeleine region of the province of Quebec in Canada. In addition to Rivière-à-Claude itself, the municipality also includes the community of Ruisseau-à-Rebours.

== History ==
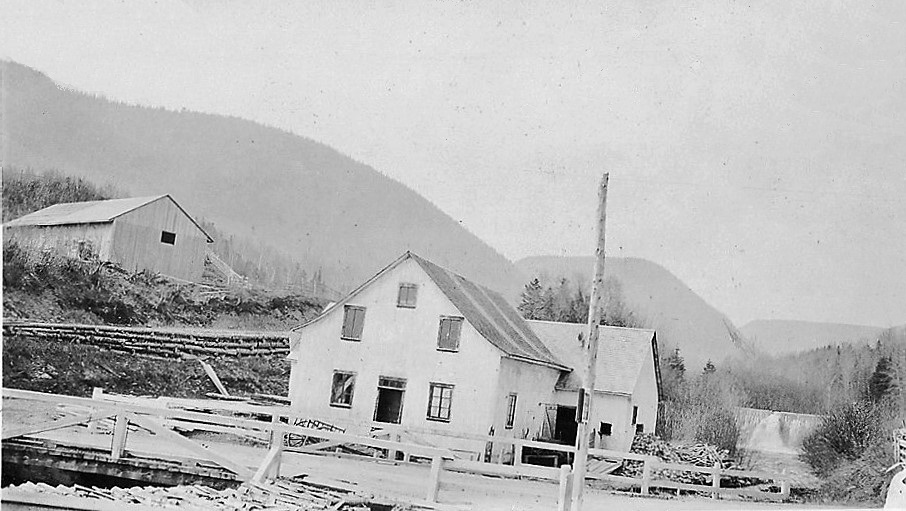
Mill in 1922

The first permanent settlers arrived in 1860. The settlement, originally called Duchesnay after senator Édouard-Louis-Antoine-Charles Juchereau Duchesnay (1809-1886), gained a post office in 1879 and grew to 200 persons by 1888. In 1898, the Parish of Saint-Évagre was founded.

In 1923, the place was incorporated as Municipality of Duchesnay. In 1968, the municipality was renamed to Rivière-à-Claude after the Claude River that has its source near the municipality's inland boundary. This river may be named in honour of a pioneer named Joseph Glaude, but there is no certainty since various spellings have existed over time.

== Demographics ==
In the 2021 Census of Population conducted by Statistics Canada, Rivière-à-Claude had a population of 141 living in 76 of its 113 total private dwellings, a change of 10.2% from its 2016 population of 128. With a land area of 155.95 km^{2} (60.21 sq mi), it had a population density of 0.9/km^{2} (2.3/sq mi) in 2021.

Canada census – Rivière-à-Claude, Quebec community profile

	2021	2016	2011
Population	141 (+10.2% from 2016)	128 (-1.5% from 2011)	130 (-24.0% from 2006)
Land area	155.95 km^{2} (60.21 sq mi)	156.28 km^{2} (60.34 sq mi)	156.61 km^{2} (60.47 sq mi)
Population density	0.9/km^{2} (2.3/sq mi)	0.8/km^{2} (2.1/sq mi)	0.8/km^{2} (2.1/sq mi)
Median age	62.0 (M: 62.0, F: 62.8)	64.0 (M: 62.5, F: 65.0)	58.5 (M: 55.8, F: 60.8)
Private dwellings	113 (total) 76 (occupied)	70 (total)	127 (total)
Median household income	$.N/A	$.N/A	$.N/A

Notes: Income data for this area has been suppressed for data quality or confidentiality reasons.
References: 2021 2016 2011

Historical Census Data - Rivière-à-Claude, Quebec

Year	Pop.	±%
1931	337	—
1941	384	+13.9%
1951	425	+10.7%
1956	450	+5.9%
1961	427	−5.1%
1966	370	−13.3%

Year	Pop.	±%
1971	352	−4.9%
1976	307	−12.8%
1981	286	−6.8%
1986	251	−12.2%
1991	203	−19.1%
1996	192	−5.4%

Year	Pop.	±%
2001	161	−16.1%
2006	171	+6.2%
2011	130	−24.0%
2016	128	−1.5%
2021	141	+10.2%

Source: Statistics Canada

== Government ==
List of former mayors:

- Alphé Leclerc (1930–1935)
- Charles Bernier (1935–1939, 1943–1946)
- Léude Rioux (1939–1943)
- Alphonse Rioux (1946–1951)
- Germain Auclair (1951–1969)
- Arthur Rioux (1969–1977)
- Josep Eleude Robert Castonguay (1977–1979)
- Marius Auclair (1979–1993)
- Joseph Marius Hilaire Castonguay (1993–2005)
- Micheline Bernier (2005–2009)
- Réjean Normand (2005–present)

== See also ==
- List of municipalities in Quebec
