= La Haute-Gaspésie Regional County Municipality =

La Haute-Gaspésie
- Regional county municipality
- Coordinates: 49°13′N 66°04′W
- Country: Canada
- Province: Quebec
- Region: Gaspésie–Îles-de-la-Madeleine
- Effective: March 18, 1981
- County seat: Sainte-Anne-des-Monts

Government
  - Type: Prefecture
  - Prefect: Sylvain Tanguay

Area
  - Total: 5,189.31 km^{2} (2,003.60 sq mi)
  - Land: 5,053.88 km^{2} (1,951.31 sq mi)

Population (2021)
  - Total: 10,950
  - Density: 2.2/km^{2} (5.7/sq mi)
  - Change (2016-21): ▼3.2%
  - Dwellings: 6,222
- Time zone: UTC−5 (EST)
  - Summer (DST): UTC−4 (EDT)
- Area codes: 418 and 581
- Website: www.hautegaspesie.com

La Haute-Gaspésie (French pronunciation: [la ot gaspezi]) is a regional county municipality in the Gaspésie–Îles-de-la-Madeleine region of eastern Quebec, Canada, on the Gaspé peninsula. The regional county municipality seat is in Sainte-Anne-des-Monts.

Prior to May 27, 2000, it was known as Denis-Riverin Regional County Municipality.

== Subdivisions ==
There are 10 subdivisions within the RCM:

Cities & Towns (2)

- Cap-Chat
- Sainte-Anne-des-Monts

Municipalities (4)

- La Martre
- Rivière-à-Claude
- Sainte-Madeleine-de-la-Rivière-Madeleine
- Saint-Maxime-du-Mont-Louis

Villages (2)

- Marsoui
- Mont-Saint-Pierre

Unorganized Territory (2)

- Coulée-des-Adolphe
- Mont-Albert

== Demographics ==
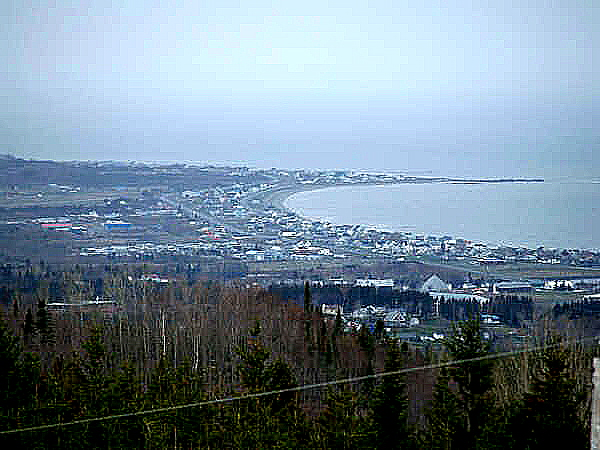
Sainte-Anne-des-Monts

=== Population ===
Canada census – La Haute-Gaspésie community profile

	2021	2016	2011
Population	10,950 (-3.2% from 2016)	11,316 (-6.4% from 2011)	12,088 (-2.0% from 2006)
Land area	5,053.88 km^{2} (1,951.31 sq mi)	5,066.06 km^{2} (1,956.02 sq mi)	5,066.02 km^{2} (1,956.00 sq mi)
Population density	2.2/km^{2} (5.7/sq mi)	2.2/km^{2} (5.7/sq mi)	2.4/km^{2} (6.2/sq mi)
Median age	56.4 (M: 56.0, F: 56.4)	53.8 (M: 53.2, F: 54.2)	51.0 (M: 50.6, F: 51.4)
Private dwellings	6,222 (total) 5,415 (occupied)	6,282 (total)	6,292 (total)
Median household income	$52,800	$45,046	$38,749

References: 2021 2016 2011

Historical Census Data - La Haute-Gaspésie Regional County Municipality, Quebec

Year	Pop.	±%
1991	14,019	—
1996	13,733	−2.0%
2001	12,722	−7.4%
2006	12,329	−3.1%

Year	Pop.	±%
2011	12,088	−2.0%
2016	11,316	−6.4%
2021	10,950	−3.2%

=== Language ===
Canada Census Mother Tongue - La Haute-Gaspésie Regional County Municipality, Quebec
Census	Total	French			English			French & English			Other		
Year	Responses	Count	Trend	Pop %	Count	Trend	Pop %	Count	Trend	Pop %	Count	Trend	Pop %
2016	11,165	11,010	▼7.0%	98.61%	45	▼30.8%	0.40%	20	0%	0.18%	90	▲100.0%	0.81%
2011	11,970	11,840	▼1.4%	98.91%	65	▲225.0%	0.54%	20	▲100.0%	0.17%	45	▼65.4%	0.38%
2006	12,170	12,010	▼3.3%	98.69%	20	▼60.0%	0.16%	10	0.0%	0.08%	130	▲550.0%	1.07%
2001	12,495	12,415	▼7.9%	99.36%	50	▼16.7%	0.40%	10	▼77.8%	0.08%	20	0.0%	0.16%
1996	13,610	13,485	n/a	99.08%	60	n/a	0.44%	45	n/a	0.33%	20	n/a	0.15%

== Transportation ==
=== Access Routes ===
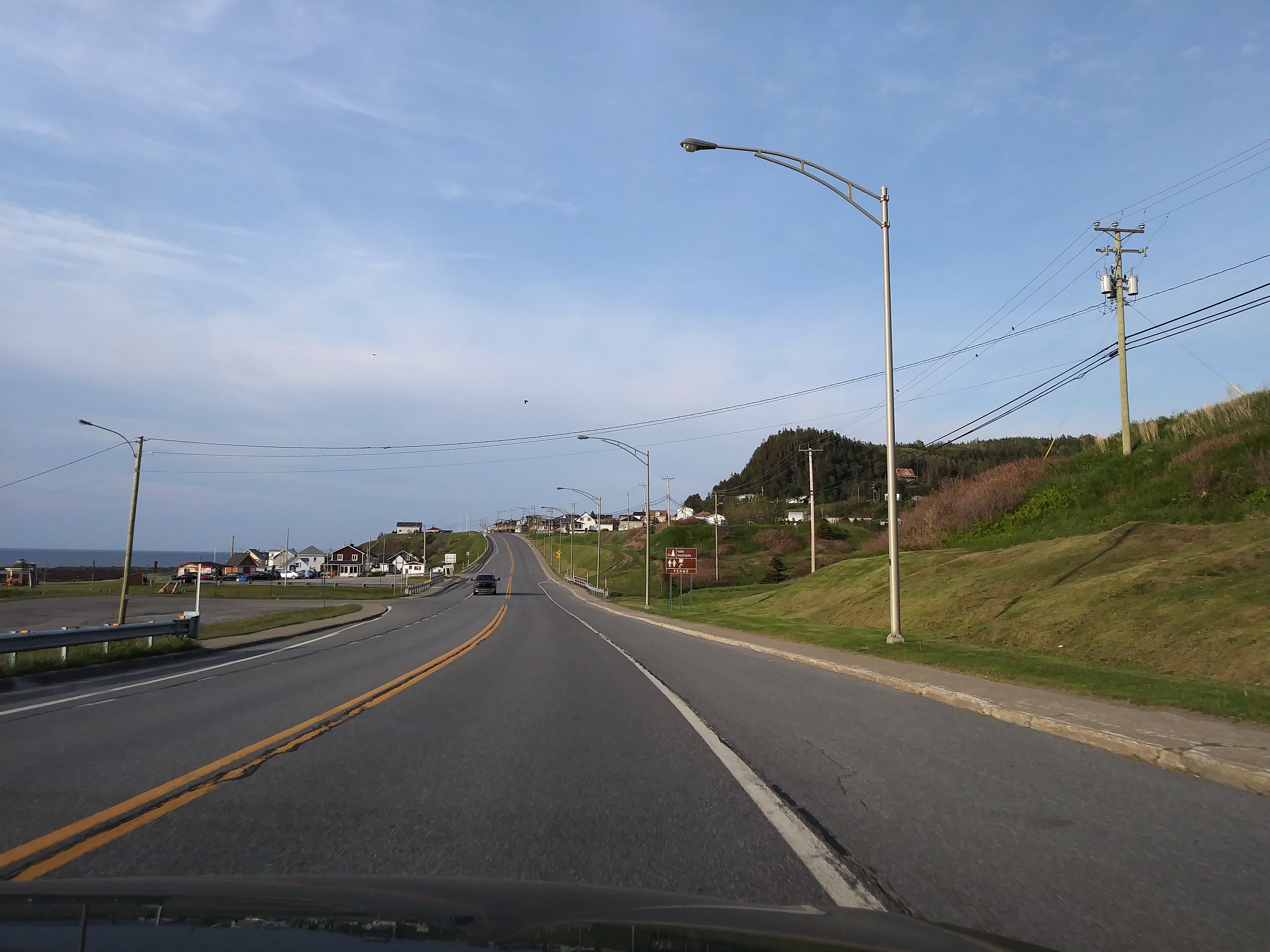
Quebec Route 132 in Sainte-Anne-des-Monts

Highways and numbered routes that run through the municipality, including external routes that start or finish at the county border:

- Autoroutes
  - None
- Principal Highways
  - R-132
  - R-198
- Secondary Highways
  - R-299
- External Routes
  - None

== See also ==
- List of regional county municipalities and equivalent territories in Quebec
