= Pabos =

Pabos may refer to:

- Pabos, Quebec, former name of Chandler, a town in the Gaspésie–Îles-de-la-Madeleine region of Quebec, Canada
- Grand-Pabos, former seigneurie of New France
- Petit-Pabos, a community within the city of Grande-Rivière, Quebec

== See also ==
- Pabo (disambiguation)
- Grand Pabos River, a river in the Gaspé Peninsula of Quebec
- Grand Pabos West River, a river in the Gaspé Peninsula of Quebec
- Petit Pabos River, a river in the Gaspé Peninsula of Quebec
