= Zec de la Grande-Rivière =

- Location within Quebec
- Location: Mont-Alexandre, Quebec, Canada
- Coordinates: 48°32′00″N 64°36′00″WCommission de toponymie du Québec - Bank of place names - Toponym: Zec de la Grande-Rivière
- Established: 1980

The Zec de la Grande-Rivière is a zone d'exploitation contrôlée (controlled harvesting zone or ZEC) in the unorganized territory of Mont-Alexandre, in Le Rocher-Percé Regional County Municipality, in administrative region of Gaspésie-Îles-de-la-Madeleine, Quebec, Canada. The economy of the territory of the ZEC is based primarily on fishing.

== Geography ==
Grand River (French: Grande Rivière) flows from north to south and empties into the Chaleur Bay at Grande-Rivière. The territory of the ZEC extends 23 kilometres (14 mi) along the shore of the river.

The Grand River has 55 pools for salmon breeding, which are divided into three quota sectors and a further three non-quota sectors. These pools are identified along the road by special numbering. All sectors are fished by wading.

Provincial fishing licenses are available at the administrative office of the Zec which is located at 3, rue Grande-Allée East, Grande-Rivière or at the Zec entrance station. In order to reach it, members and visitors to the ZEC, start from the city of Grande-Rivière, drive on the route Rameau, located on the border of the municipalities of Grande-Rivière and the one of Sainte-Thérèse-de-Gaspé and Percé.

== History ==
The Gaspé Peninsula, including the Grande-Rivière area, was inhabited for thousands of years before European fishers, traders and explorers began passing through the area at the end of the 15th century. Europeans first began settling near the river in the late seventeenth century. On May 31, 1697, Count Frontenac wrote the deed for the seigneurie of the Grande-Rivière, the first seigneur being Jacques Cochu.

After the British conquest of New France, the land passed to the British and a group of Jersey Islanders. In 1919, it was sold to Americans who established the Grand River Fishing Club, which remained in operation until it was bought out in 1992.

== Toponymy ==
The name "Zec de la Grande-Rivière" takes its name from the river of the same name. The name" Zec de la Grande-Rivière" was formalized on December 5, 1982 in the Bank of place names of the Commission de toponymie du Québec (Geographical Names Board of Quebec).

== See also ==
- Gaspé
- Zec Pabok
- Zec des Anses
- Réserve faunique de la rivière Saint-Jean (Wildlife Sanctuary of Saint John River)
- Réserve écologique de la Grande-Rivière (Ecological Reserve Great River)
