= Gaspé (Province of Canada electoral district) =

Electoral district in former Province of Canada

Province of Canada electoral district

Defunct pre-Confederation electoral district
- Legislature: Legislative Assembly of the Province of Canada
- District created: 1841
- District abolished: 1867
- First contested: 1841
- Last contested: 1863

Gaspé was an electoral district of the Legislative Assembly of the Parliament of the Province of Canada, in Canada East. Located on the Gaspé Peninsula, it was created in 1841, based on the previous electoral district of the same name for the Legislative Assembly of Lower Canada. It was represented by one member in the Legislative Assembly.

The electoral district was abolished in 1867, upon the creation of Canada and the province of Quebec.

== Boundaries ==
The Union Act, 1840 merged the two provinces of Upper Canada and Lower Canada into the Province of Canada, with a single Parliament. The separate parliaments of Lower Canada and Upper Canada were abolished.

The Union Act provided that the pre-existing electoral boundaries of Lower Canada and Upper Canada would continue to be used in the new Parliament, unless altered by the Union Act itself. The Gaspé electoral district of Lower Canada was not altered by the Act, and therefore continued with the same boundaries which had been set by a statute of Lower Canada in 1829:

The County of Gaspé shall be bounded on the south west by a line, commencing at Point Maquereaux, on the north side, and at the entrance of Chaleurs Bay, running from thence north west, a distance of forty-seven miles, thence south, sixty-nine degrees west, until it intersects a line running from Cape Chat on the River Saint Lawrence, due south east, on the west by the said last mentioned line, and on the north and east by the River and Gulf of Saint Lawrence, including in the said County, the Island of Bonaventure, and all the Islands in front thereof, in whole or in part, nearest the same, as well as the Magdalen Islands in the said Gulf of Saint Lawrence, which said County so bounded, comprises the Fiefs of Saint Anne, Magdalene, Grand Vallée des Monts and Anse de l'Etang, the Bay of Gaspé, and settlements therein, Point Saint Peter, Malbay, Percé, Quebec, Anse à Beaufils, Cape Despair, Grand River, Little River and Pabos, and New-Port.

The electoral district was at the eastern end of the Gaspé Peninsula (now part of the Gaspésie–Îles-de-la-Madeleine administrative region). The elections took place in Point Saint Peters.

== Members of the Legislative Assembly ==
Gaspé was a single-member consistutency.

The following were the members of the Legislative Assembly from Gaspé. "Party" was a fluid concept, especially during the early years of the Province of Canada. Party affiliations are based on the biographies of individual members given by the National Assembly of Quebec, as well as votes in the Legislative Assembly.

Parliament	Member	Years in Office	Party
1st Parliament; 1841–1844	Robert Christie	1841–1854	Anti-unionist; Independent
2nd Parliament; 1844–1847	Robert Christie	1841–1854	Independent
3rd Parliament; 1848–1851	Robert Christie	1841–1854	Conservative Independent
4th Parliament; 1851–1854	Robert Christie	1841–1854	Independent

== Abolition ==
The district was abolished on July 1, 1867, when the British North America Act, 1867 came into force, splitting the Province of Canada into Quebec and Ontario. It was succeeded by electoral districts of the same name in the House of Commons of Canada and the Legislative Assembly of Quebec.
