= Charles Robin =

Entrepreneur from the Isle of Jersey

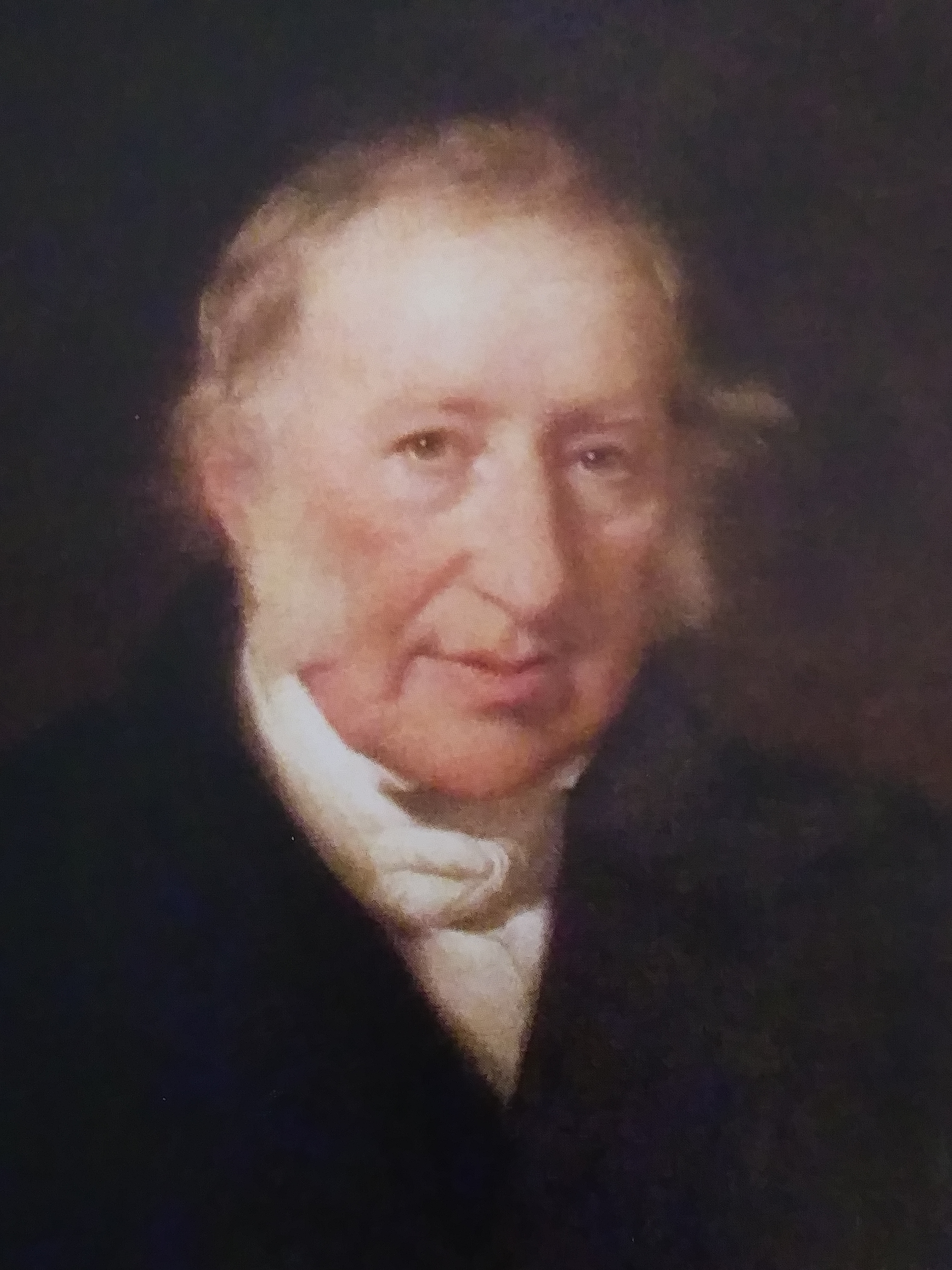
- Born: October 30, 1743; St Brelade, Jersey
- Died: June 10, 1824 (aged 80); Saint Aubin, Jersey
- Occupations: Merchant, businessman, judge

Charles Robin (October 30, 1743 – June 10, 1824) was a merchant from the Isle of Jersey, who traded between the maritime region of Canada and the British Isles.

== Fishery trader ==
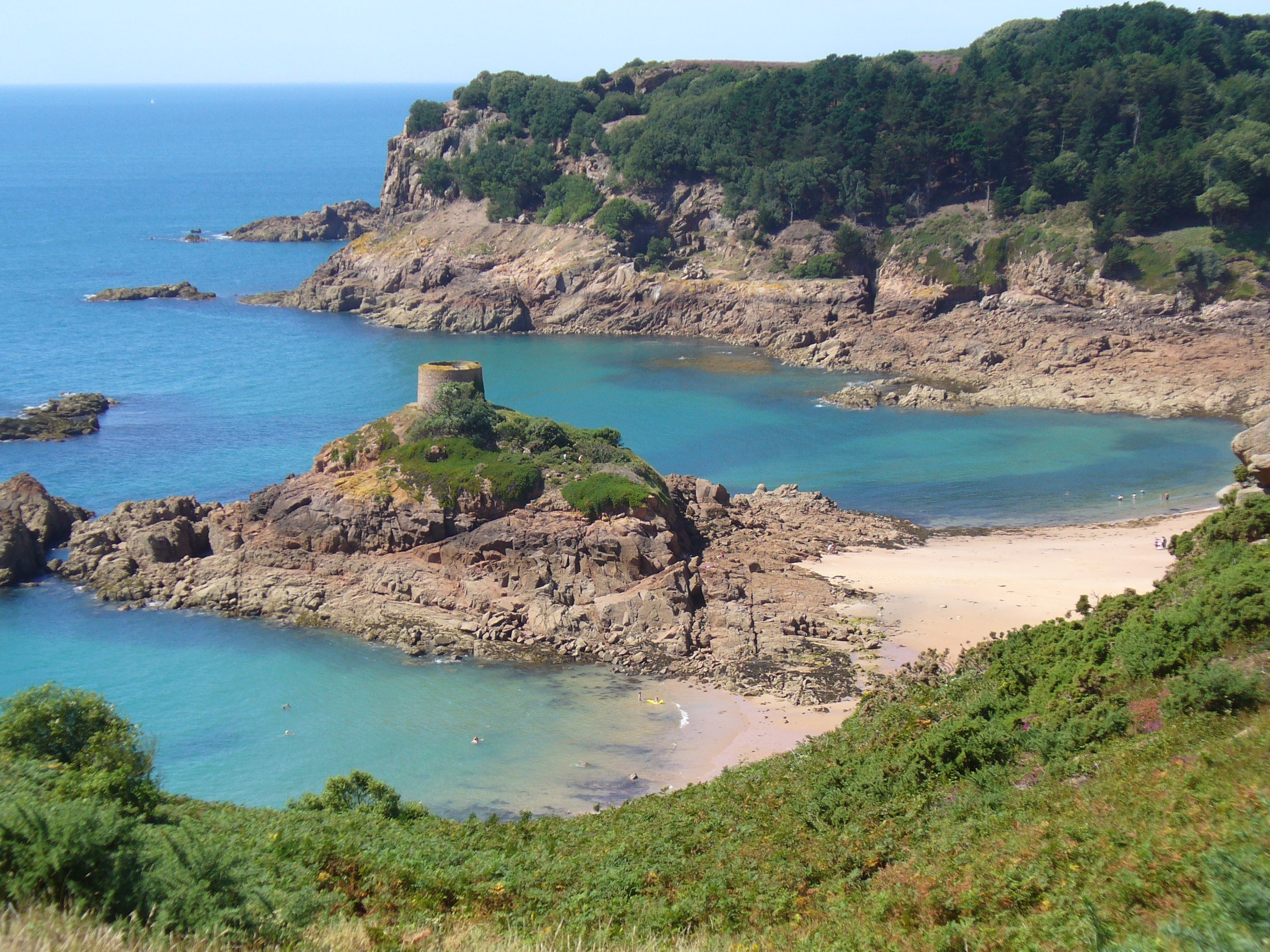
The coastline of St. Brelade, Jersey, birthplace of Charles Robin

He was born in Saint Brélade, Jersey in 1743. By 1763, he was the captain of a ship working in the Newfoundland cod trade. In 1765, with his two brothers and two others, they formed a firm which developed fishing grounds off Cape Breton Island and the Gaspé region. The company sold dried cod to Portugal and Spain, and salmon, furs, and timber to England and Quebec. Robin saw off competitors from Guernsey and several other Jersey firms through judicious employment of a truck system.

Robin brought exiled Acadians from France to work on Cape Breton Island and in the Chaleur Bay region. The area was sparsely settled in these early years: in 1765 there were 209 persons in the Baie des Chaleurs: 93 Indians in the Restigouche area and 109 persons in Gaspé. By 1774–5 there were 200 persons in the Baie des Chaleurs and 158 at Bonaventure. In 1777, three families at "Gaspee" and four on Bonaventure Island, two families at each of the seigneuries of Grand River and Pabos, and ten families (sixty persons) wintering at Paspébiac were reported. Malbaie and Point St. Peter were described as "inhabited by people from the Rebel Colonies who came away at the Commencement of the War" and some Acadians had settled at Bonaventure and Tracadigaiche. The Census of Canada gives a total population, seasonal and permanent, of 874 persons on the coast between Gaspé and Tracadigaiche in 1777.

The operation suffered much damage at the hands of American forces during the American Revolution. Robin, who had quit in despair six years earlier on the destruction by Americans of his ship, became partner in a new firm under his own name in 1783. The company advanced merchandise to fisherman against future catches; this resulted in a labour force captive to credit and reduced costs for the company. His connections with the government in Quebec gave him access to the best beach locations near the fishing grounds used to cure the fish.

Robin's fishing and trading operations extended around the Gulf of St. Lawrence region, particularly Paspebiac, Quebec, and Arichat, Nova Scotia. From 1790, he built 200 ton merchant ships at Paspebiac. Fishermen on Isle Madame sold all of their fish to Robin, allowing him to control the price. Other merchants at Isle Madame included Valpy dit Janvrin, LeVesconte, de Gruchy, Hubert, Jean, and Moore. Many of these firms continued to exploit Isle Madame's fisheries until well into the twentieth century.

When he left Paspébiac for good on 28 September 1802, his company had extended to include general stores and fishing stations all along the Gaspé, with a few in Cape Breton and at least one on the Lower North Shore of the St Lawrence at Magpie. His company was exporting somewhere in the region of 15,000 to 17,000 quintals (kin'tle: a quintal is equivalent to 112 pounds) of dry cod each year to ports in Europe – principally Spain, Portugal, and Italy – and the coast of South America.

== Later life ==
Robin was a judge in the Court of Common Pleas (of the Province of Quebec) from 1788 to 1792, a justice of the peace, and served on the land board for the legal District of Gaspé. In 1802, Robin retired to Jersey. He died in Saint Aubin, Jersey, in 1824.

He never married. His successors in the company were his brother's three sons. When he died on 14 June 1824 at the age of 81, he left assets worth about £22,500 (equivalent to £2,500,944 in 2023).

== Development of Robin & Co. ==
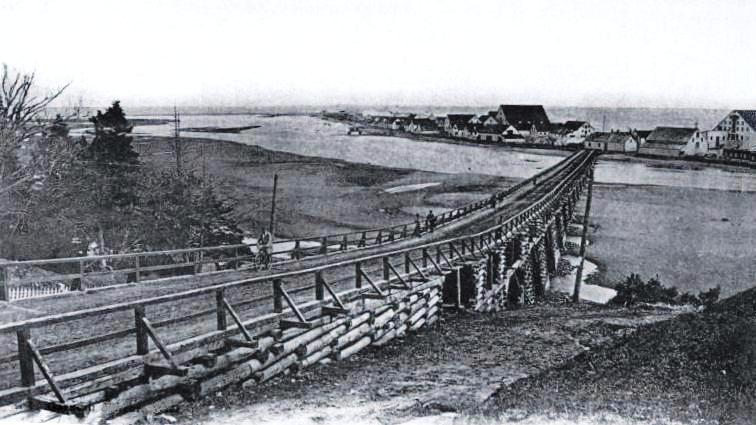
Lagoon bridge in Paspébiac, 1910

Robin groomed his nephews Philip and James to take over the operation of the company, which remained an important part of the region's economy for the century that followed. Several export markets mid-18th century for the Charles Robin and Company firm were located at Naples, Civitavecchia, Cádiz, Porto, Jersey, Trinidad, Pernambuco, Bahia and Rio de Janeiro.

The company evolved into the 20th century as Robin, Jones and Whitman, with establishments, c. 1940 on the Gaspé Coast in Bonaventure, Paspébiac, Port-Daniel–Gascons (Anse-aux-Gascons), Newport Islands, Newport Point, Pabos, Grande-Rivière, Sainte-Thérèse-de-Gaspé, Anse-à-Beaufils, Percé, Barachois, Malbaie, Gaspé (where there were two stores), Anse-à-Griffon and Rivière-au-Renard. In New Brunswick there were locations at Caraquet, Shippegan and Lamèque. In Nova Scotia, Chéticamp, Inverness, Musquodoboit Harbour. On the North Shore of the St. Lawrence River, Magpie River, Thunder River (Rivière-au-Tonnerre), Sheldrake (Port-Cartier), Eskimo Point, Seven Islands (Sept-Îles), Mingan and St John River.

== See also ==
- Fishing industry in Canada
