= Grand Pabos West River =

Grand Pabos West River Grand Pabos Ouest, Rivière Grand Pabos Ouest
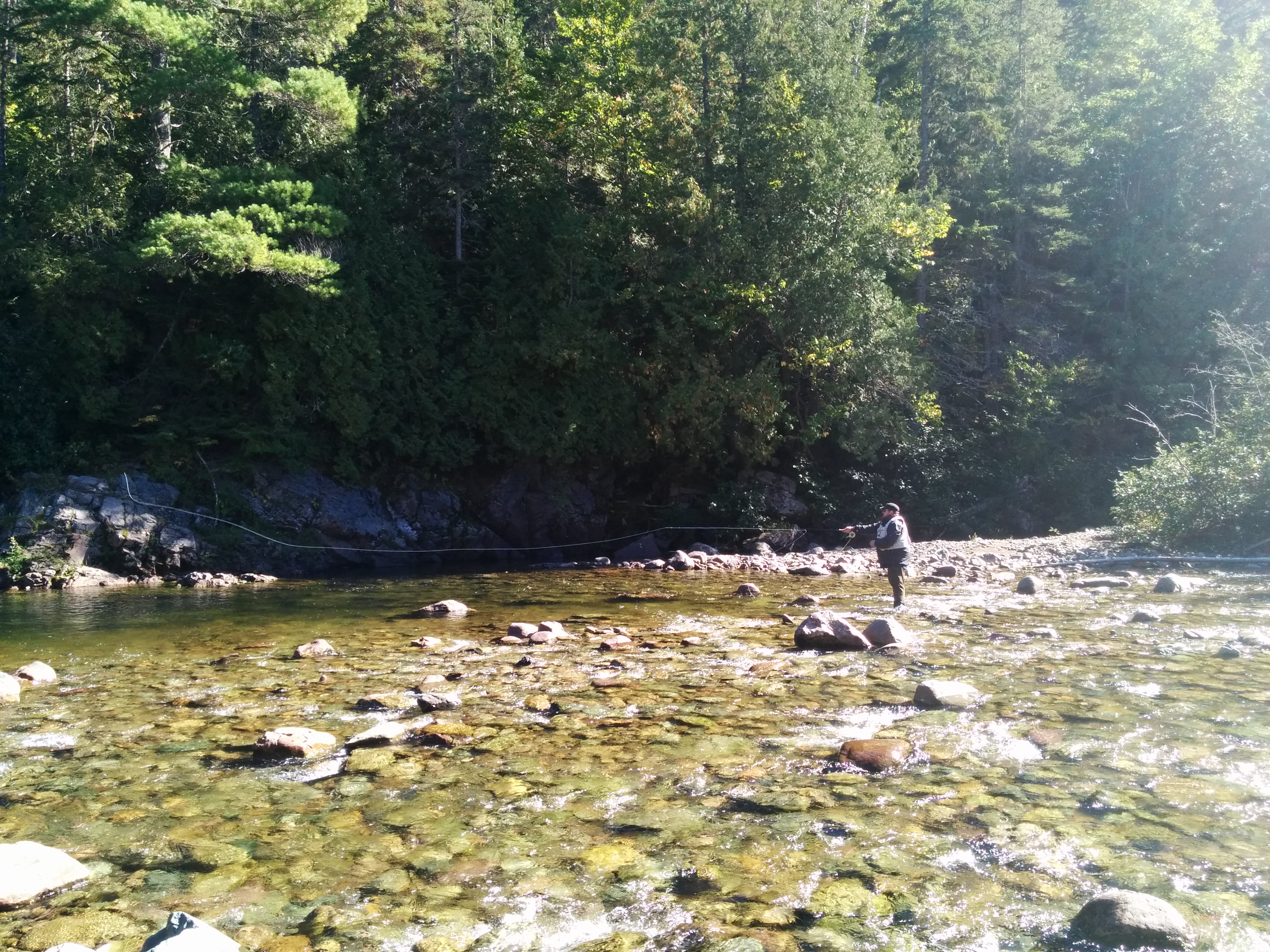
- A salmon Fisherman at the Pabos West River

Location
- Country: Canada
- Province: Quebec
- Region: Bas-Saint-Laurent, Gaspésie

Physical characteristics
- Source: Mont-Alexandre, Quebec
  - location: Uncharted territory, Gaspé Peninsula
  - coordinates: 48°37′0″N 65°9′0″W
  - elevation: 427 m (1,401 ft)
- Mouth: Pabos Bay (Chaleur Bay)
  - location: Chandler, Quebec, Gaspé Peninsula
  - coordinates: 48°20′16.01″N 64°44′7.01″W
  - elevation: 0 m (0 ft)
- Length: 47.3 km (29.4 mi)
- Discharge
  - location: Gulf of Saint Lawrence
  - average: 0 m^{3}/s (0 cu ft/s)

The Grand Pabos West River or Pabos West River (French : Rivière du Grand Pabos Ouest) is a river in the Gaspé Peninsula of Quebec, Canada, which has its source in streams of the Chic-Choc Mountains in the Mont-Alexandre, Quebec sector. The river is about 47.3 kilometres (29.4 mi) long. Its name comes from the Mi'kmaq word pabog meaning "tranquility waters"

== Salmon fishing ==
The Grand Pabos West River is known for its Atlantic Salmon (salmo salar) fishing. The river was a renowned salmon river from 1880 to 1950. Overfished, the salmon were almost completely annihilated in 1984 and the river was closed to fisherman. It has been reopened since 2003. The water of the Pabos West River is of a copper color and is not as crystal clear as the other two Pabos rivers but still fairly transparent.

== Access and administration ==
The river is accessible via Quebec Route 132 and is managed by an organism that administrates salmon fishing on the 3 Pabos Rivers. It is easy to fish the Grand Pabos River and the Petit Pabos River on the same fishing trip.

== See also ==
- List of rivers of Quebec
- Grand Pabos River
- Petit Pabos River
