= Zec Pabok =

- Location within Quebec
- Location: Canada, Quebec, Le Rocher-Percé Regional County Municipality
- Nearest city: Chandler
- Coordinates: 48°20′38″N 64°42′20″W
- Area: length 165 kilometres (103 mi)
- Established: 1997

The Zec Pabok is a "zone d'exploitation contrôlée" (Controlled harvesting zone) (ZEC) located in the municipality of Chandler in the Le Rocher-Percé Regional County Municipality (RCM) in administrative region Gaspésie-Îles-de-la-Madeleine, in Quebec, in Canada. The ZEC has a mixed use including salmon fishing.

== Geography ==
Zec Pabok is located near the banks of the Baie-des-Chaleurs and close to the Zec des Anses.

== Toponymy ==
The name Zec Pabok was formalized on December 12, 1997, to the Bank of place names in the Commission de toponymie du Québec (Geographical Names Board of Quebec).

== See also ==
=== Related articles ===
- Baie des Chaleurs, Gaspésie
- Gaspé, Gaspésie
- Chandler
- Réserve écologique de la Grande-Rivière (Ecological Reserve of Grande-Rivière)
- Zec des Anses
- Zone d'exploitation contrôlée (Controlled harvesting zone) (ZEC)
