= Petit Pabos River =

Petit Pabos River Rivière du Petit Pabos, Little Babos River
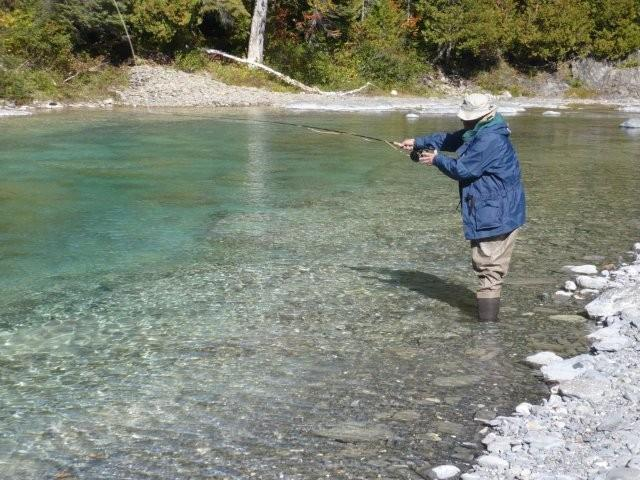
- A salmon Fisherman at the Petit Pabos River

Location
- Country: Canada
- Province: Quebec
- Region: Bas-Saint-Laurent, Gaspésie

Physical characteristics
- Source: Mont-Alexandre, Quebec
  - location: Uncharted territory, Gaspé Peninsula
  - coordinates: 48°37′0″N 65°9′0″W
  - elevation: 419 m (1,375 ft)
- Mouth: Chaleur Bay
  - location: Chandler, Quebec, Gaspé Peninsula
  - coordinates: 48°22′34.24″N 64°35′20.819″W
  - elevation: 0 m (0 ft)
- Length: 61.6 km (38.3 mi)
- Discharge
  - location: Gulf of Saint Lawrence
  - average: 0 m^{3}/s (0 cu ft/s)

The Petit Pabos River (Little Babos River in English) is a river in the Gaspé Peninsula of Quebec, Canada, which has its source at streams of the Chic-Choc Mountains in the Mont-Alexandre, Quebec sector. The river is about 61.6 kilometres (38.3 mi) long. Its name comes from the Mi'kmaq word pabog meaning “tranquility waters”.

== Salmon fishing ==
The Petit Pabos River is known for its Atlantic Salmon (salmo salar) fishing in crystal clear blue water and his deep forest environment. The river has long been a renowned salmon river from 1880 to 1950. Overfished, the salmons where almost completely annihilate in 1984 and the river was closed to fisherman. It has been reopened since 2003. The Petit Pabos River is smaller the other 2 Pabos rivers: the Grand Pabos River and the Grand Pabos West River and have a smaller salmon presence. But it is often consider to be more beautiful and less fished.

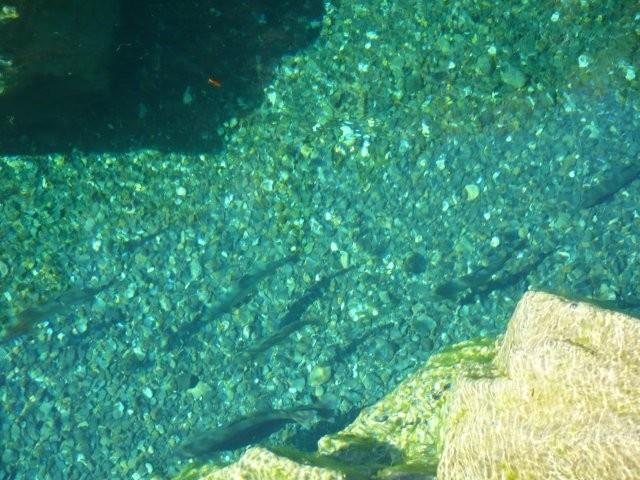
The crystal Clear water of the river anables you to see the salmons.

== Access and administration ==
The river is accessible via Quebec Route 132 and is managed by an organisation that administrates salmon fishing on the 3 Pabos Rivers. It is easy to fish the Grand Pabos West River and the Grand Pabos River on the same fishing trip.

== See also ==
- List of rivers of Quebec
- Grand Pabos West River
- Grand Pabos River
