= Zec des Anses =

- Location within Quebec
- Location: Le Rocher-Percé Regional County Municipality
- Nearest city: Percé
- Coordinates: 48°17′00″N 64°57′00″W
- Area: 164
- Established: 1979

The ZEC des Anses is a "zone d'exploitation contrôlée" (controlled harvesting zone) (ZEC) of 164 square kilometres (63 sq mi), located in the municipality of Chandler, in Le Rocher-Percé Regional County Municipality, in the administrative region of Gaspésie-Îles-de-la-Madeleine, in Quebec, in Canada. The economic activities of Zec focus on forestry and recreational and tourism activities.

The "Zec des Anses" is managed by the "Centre plein air Harfang des neiges inc". This non-profit organization was founded on February 17, 1993 and registered on September 13, 1995 to the "Registraire des entreprises du Québec" (Registrar of entreprises in Quebec) which is administered by Revenu Québec. The mission of this association is to promote outdoor activities in the region. Its head office is located in Pabos Mills.

== Geography ==
Established in 1979, the ZEC is located near the north shore of the Chaleur Bay, in Gaspé, namely:

- Southwest of Ecological Reserve of Great River,
- North of the Wildlife Sanctuary of Port-Daniel,
- Southeast of Zec Pabok.

Two rivers that empty into the "Bay of Grand Pabos" delimit the territory of the ZEC:

- West, the "brook trout river", which flows south-east, then east along the McGrath Highway,
- East, the River of Grand Pabos. Its main tributaries are: Big Creek Falls, Rocky Creek and Blue Creek.

Zec des Anses counts 54 lakes for sport fishing for trout. Lake of the Seven Islands is the main body of water. The other lakes are: Rory Islands, Armstrong, Morrison and Brule. The drainage basin of the River Petit Pabos is located on the east side; while the watershed Port-Daniel-North River is on the west side.

ZEC has numerous hiking trails for ATVs and mountain bikes. Lake Road of the Seven Islands and the McGrath Highway are the main routes of access and movement within the ZEC.

The host house of the Zec is located five minutes by car from the route 132 to Chandler. This docking station offers various equipment and fishing accessories: provincial permits, access cards, fishing tackle ... The distance to reach the reception office of the Zec, near Chandler, is: Rimouski (405 km), Carleton-sur-Mer (152 km), Bonaventure (82 km), Percé, Quebec (50 km) and Gaspé (115 km).

== Hunting and Fishing ==
In winter, followers and visitors practice ice fishing and snowmobiling. Two lakes ZEC have a specific vocation for fishing:

- The Career fishing lake "high end" to catch trout over 2.0 pounds;
- The small lake Sept-Îles, in popular fishing, with trout over 0.5 pounds.

== Toponymy ==
The name "ZEC des Anses" was recorded on August 5, 1982 at the Bank of place names in the Commission de toponymie du Québec (Geographical Names Board of Québec).

== See also ==
=== Related articles ===
- Chaleur Bay (Baie des Chaleurs)
- Gaspé
- Chandler
- Ecological Reserve of Great River
- Zec Pabok
- Zone d'exploitation contrôlée (Controlled Harvesting Zone)

== Attachments ==
=== External links ===
- Official website of ZEC des Anses.
- Official website of Wildlife Reserve of Port-Daniel.
- Official website of Ecological Reserve of Grande-Rivière (Gaspésie).
