= Newport, Chandler, Quebec =

Coordinates: 48.2667°N 64.7424°W

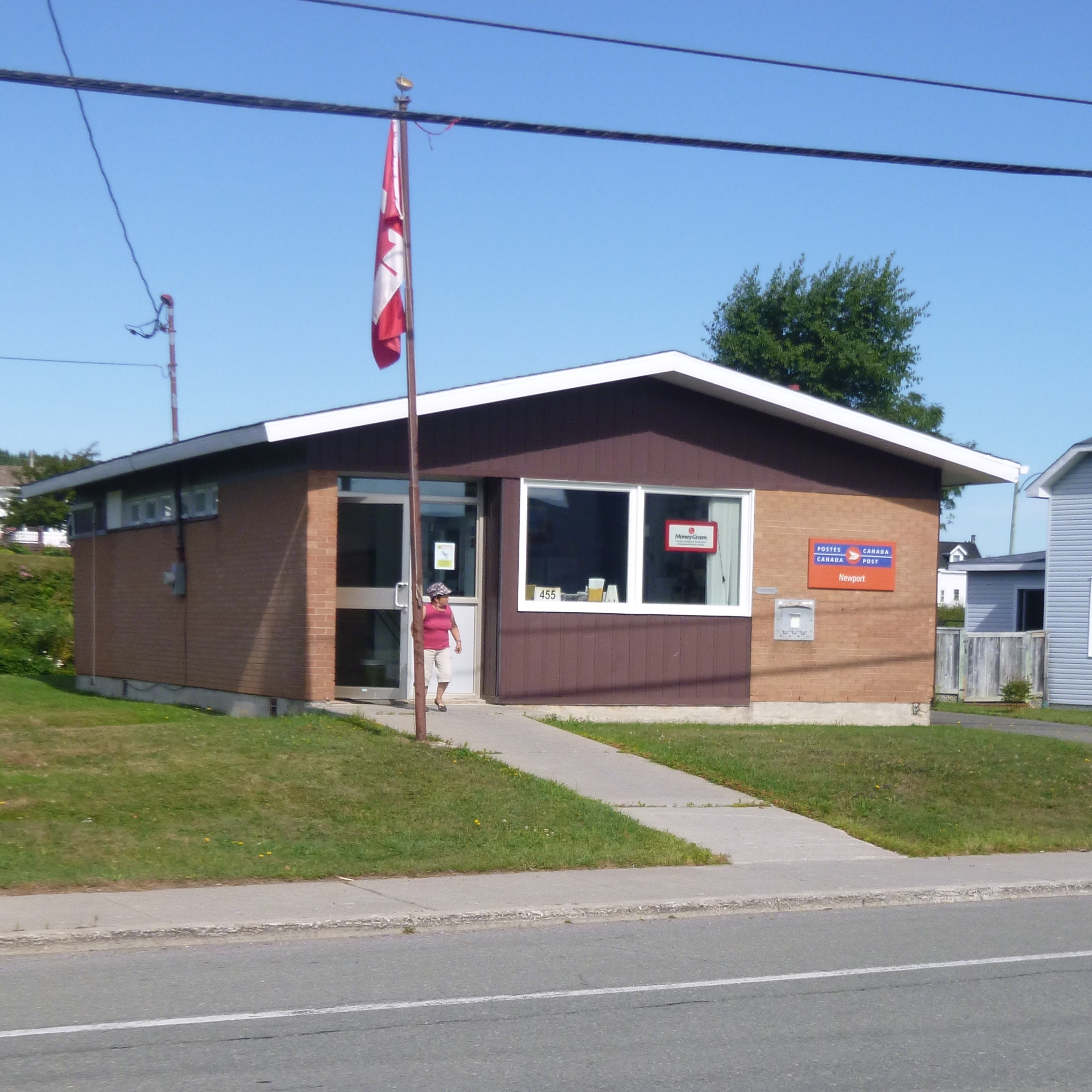
Newport post office

Newport was a former municipality in Le Rocher-Percé Regional County Municipality in the Gaspésie–Îles-de-la-Madeleine region of Quebec.

On June 27, 2001, it ceased to exist and merged with several other towns, including Pabos and Chandler; the merged town was initially called Pabos, but was renamed Chandler in 2002.
