= Grand Pabos River =

Grand Pabos River North Pabos River, Grand Pabos Nord, Rivière Grand Pabos
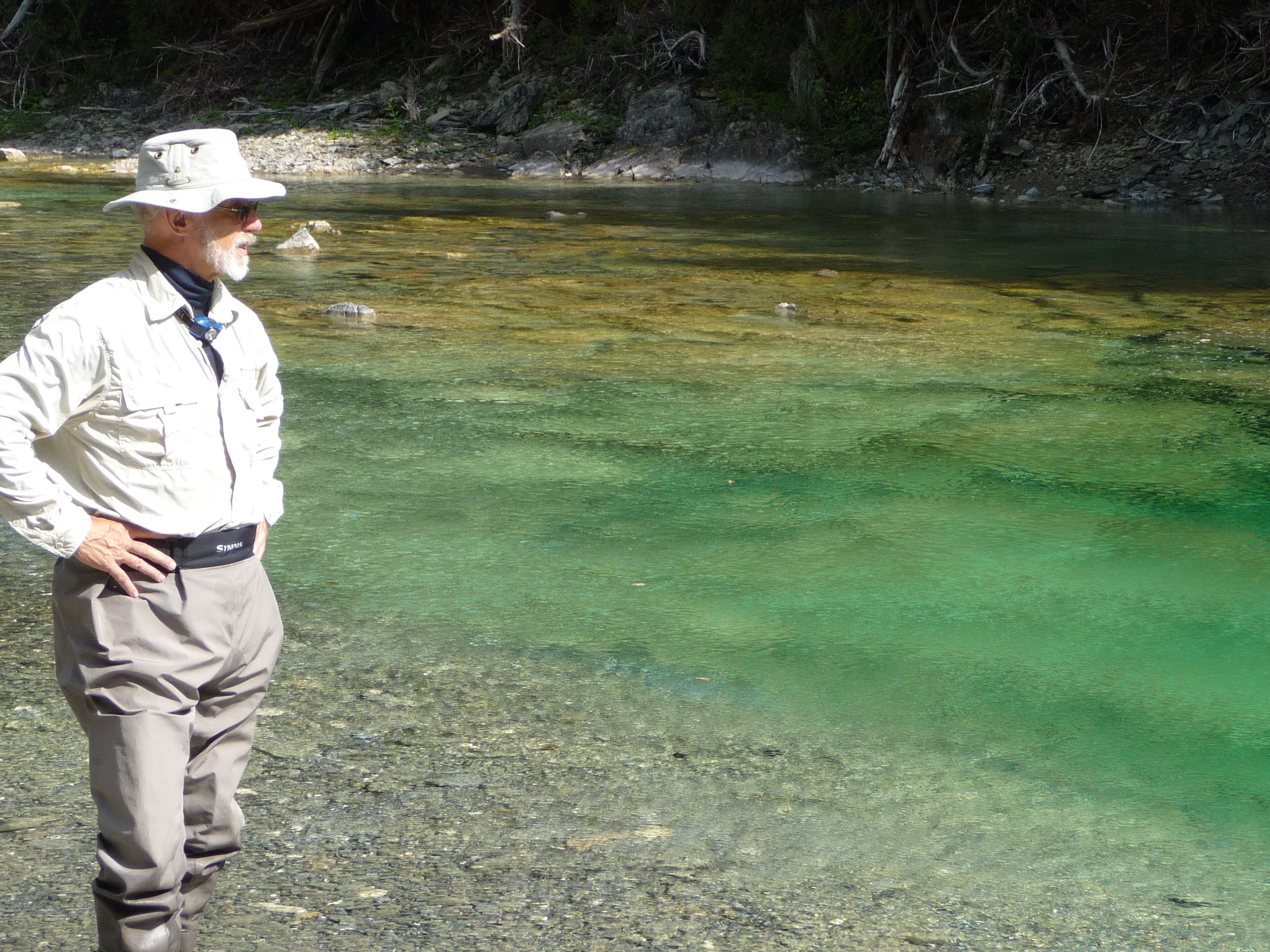
- Pool 18 on the Grand Pabos

Location
- Country: Canada
- Province: Quebec
- Region: Bas-Saint-Laurent, Gaspésie

Physical characteristics
- Source: Lac du Nord
  - location: [Gaspé Peninsula]
  - coordinates: 48°32′48.33″N 65°13′52.13″W
  - elevation: 432 m (1,417 ft)
- Mouth: Pabos Bay (Chaleur Bay)
  - location: Chandler, Quebec, [Gaspé Peninsula]
  - coordinates: 48°21′06.3″N 64°43′13.1″W
  - elevation: 0 m (0 ft)
- Length: 42 km (26 mi)
- Discharge
  - location: Gulf of Saint Lawrence
  - average: 0 m^{3}/s (0 cu ft/s)

The Grand Pabos River or Pabos North River is a river in the Gaspé Peninsula of Quebec, Canada, which has its source at Lake of the North (Lac du Nord in French), fed by streams of the Chic-Choc Mountains. The river is about 42 kilometres (26 mi) long. Its name comes from the Mi'kmaq word pabog meaning "tranquility waters".

== Salmon fishing ==
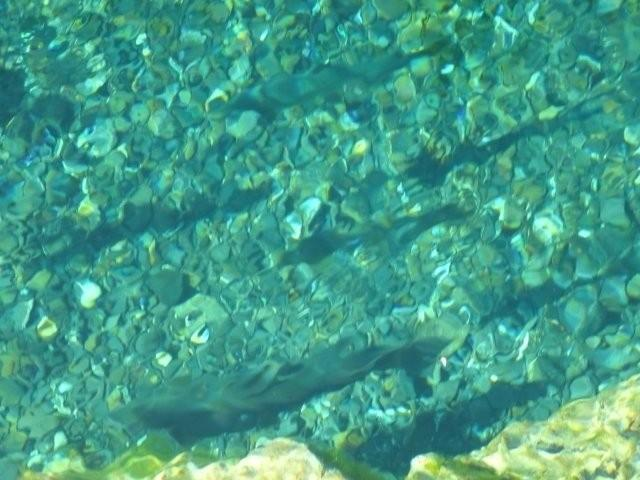
The crystal Clear water of the river anables you to see the salmons.

The Grand Pabos River is known for its Atlantic Salmon (salmo salar) fishing in clear water and deep forest with no human presence. The river has long been a renowned salmon river from 1880 to 1950. Overfished, the salmons were almost completely annihilated in 1984 and the river was closed to fisherman. It has been reopened since 2003.

== Access and administration ==
The river is accessible via Quebec Route 132 and is managed by an organisation that administrates salmon fishing on the 3 Pabos Rivers. It is easy to fish the Grand Pabos West River and the Petit Pabos River on the same fishing trip.

== See also ==
- List of rivers of Quebec
- Grand Pabos West River
- Petit Pabos River
