= Robert Christie (Lower Canada politician) =

Politician in Lower Canada and Province of Canada

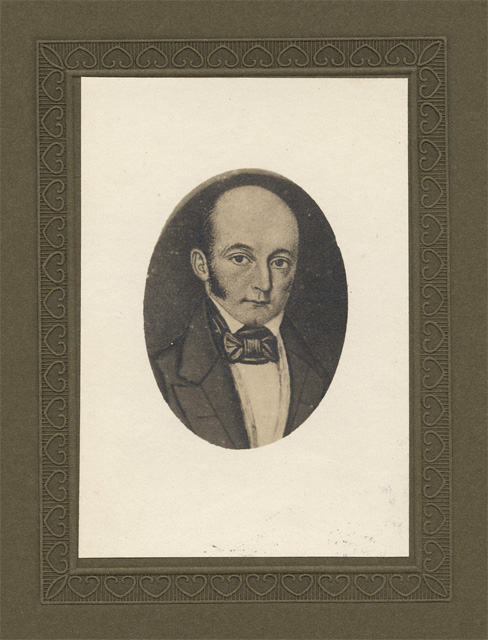
- Robert Christie

Member of the Legislative Assembly of Lower Canada for Gaspé
- In office 1827 – 1832 (elected five times and expelled five times)
- Preceded by: Jean-Thomas Taschereau
- Succeeded by: John Le Boutillier

Member of the Legislative Assembly of the Province of Canada for Gaspé (4 elections)
- In office 1841–1854
- Preceded by: New position
- Succeeded by: John Le Boutillier

Personal details
- Born: January 20, 1787 Windsor, Nova Scotia
- Died: October 13, 1856 (aged 69) Quebec City
- Resting place: Mount Hermon Cemetery, Sillery
- Party: Lower Canada: Government Party (Parti de Bureaucrates); Province of Canada: Unionist; Independent
- Spouse: Monique-Olivier Doucet (m. February 24, 1812)
- Education: King's College, Windsor, Nova Scotia
- Occupation: Journalist, public official, historian
- Profession: Lawyer

Military service
- Allegiance: Britain
- Branch/service: Lower Canada militia
- Rank: Captain
- Unit: 4th Militia Battalion
- Battles/wars: War of 1812

Robert Christie (January 20, 1787 – October 13, 1856) was a lawyer, journalist, historian and political figure in Lower Canada and Canada East (now Quebec). Born in Nova Scotia, he moved to Lower Canada as a young man. Elected to the Legislative Assembly of Lower Canada, he generally supported the Parti bureaucrates, or government group. He opposed the union of Lower Canada with Upper Canada, but was elected to the Legislative Assembly of the Province of Canada. As a member, he remained opposed to the union and was an independent, not supporting any particular party. He had a reputation for being hot-headed, but also incorruptible.

== Family and early life ==
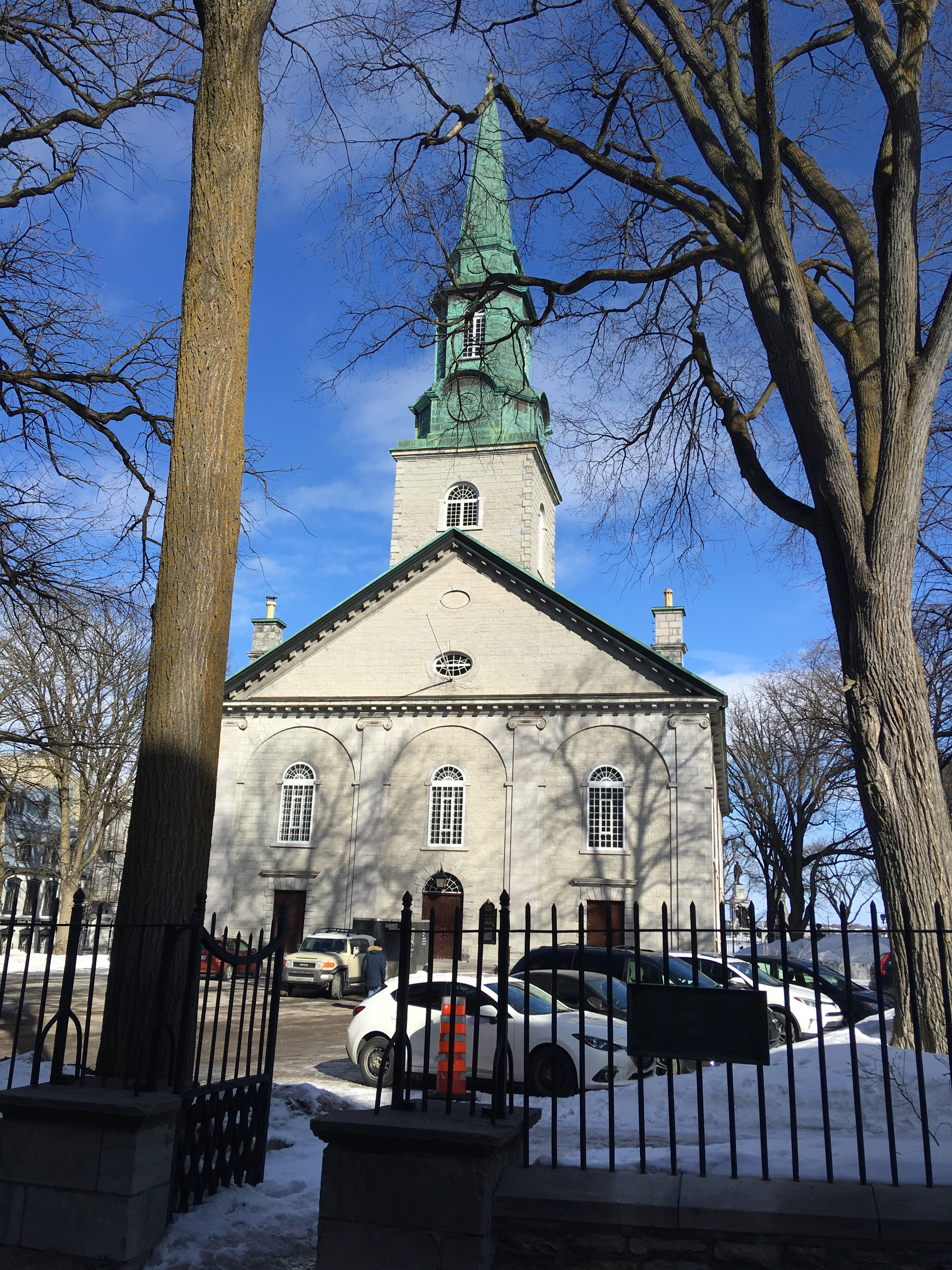
Anglican Cathedral of the Holy Trinity, Quebec, where Christie married Monique-Olivier Doucet

Christie was born in Windsor, Nova Scotia in 1787, the second son of Scottish immigrants, James Christie and Janet McIntosh. James Christie was a shoemaker who had acquired land and various positions in the Windsor area. Robert attended the King's College in Windsor, graduating some time before 1803. His father's plan was that Robert would take up business in Halifax, but in 1805 Robert went to Quebec City and was articled to Edward Bowen, a lawyer and political figure in Lower Canada. Christie became an advocate and attorney in 1810. In 1812, he married Monique-Olivier Doucet at the Anglican Cathedral of the Holy Trinity in Quebec City.

== Journalism and public service ==
Christie served in the War of 1812, reaching the rank of captain in the 4th Militia Battalion of Quebec City.

In 1816, he established the Quebec Telegraph and became its editor. The Telegraph was a weekly newspaper, with a focus on business and politics, including reports of proceedings in the provincial Legislative Assembly. Christie published it in English and French, to attract both English and French readers. The articles on political affairs became the foundation for his later books on the politics of Lower Canada. However, the paper folded in July 1817.

At the same time as he was publishing and editing the Telegraph, Christie also held the position of law clerk to the Legislative Assembly of Lower Canada, charged with drafting bills and providing legal advice to the members of the Assembly. In 1819, he was appointed the clerk of a government commission set up to investigate land claims in the Gaspé region. The Gaspé area had been settled in advance of the organization of local government, and questions arose about prior land claims. His appointment began a long personal interest in the affairs of the Gaspé.

== Political career ==
=== Lower Canada ===
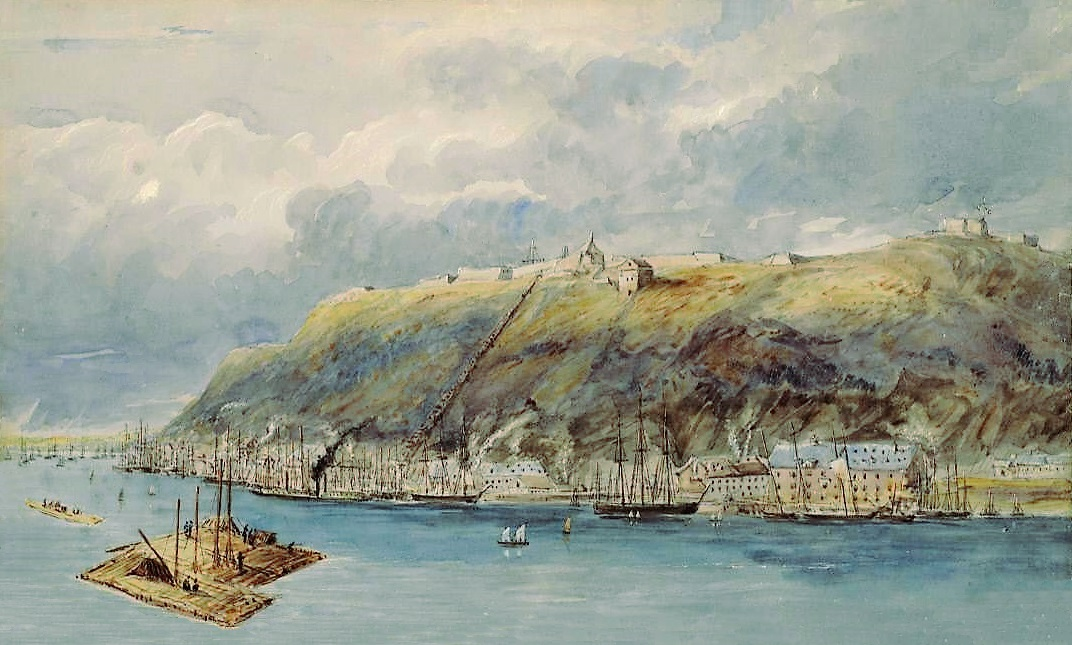
View of Quebec from the River St Lawrence, 1827

When Christie came to Lower Canada, there were tensions building between the elected Legislative Assembly and the various governors, appointed by the British government. The Parti canadien (also known as the Parti patriote) had begun to challenge the actions of the governors, who governed without regard to the wishes of the elected Assembly, particularly on the issue of the budget. One of the leaders of the Parti canadien at this time was James Stuart, also an alumnus of King's College at Windsor, who appeared to have some influence on Christie. However, Christie gained favour with Governor General Lord Dalhousie, and came to be a supporter of the provincial government against the popular movement in the Assembly.

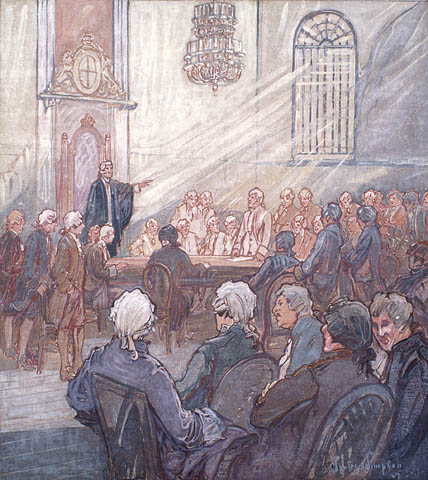
Legislative Assembly of Lower Canada, meeting in the Bishop's Chapel, Quebec

In 1827, Christie was elected to the Legislative Assembly of Lower Canada representing Gaspé and was appointed chairman of the Court of Quarter Sessions for the Quebec district. He generally supported the Government Party, also known as the Parti des Bureaucrates. He came into conflict with the Parti Canadien for removing magistrates who opposed the governor. The issue was investigated by a committee of the Assembly, and its report recounted his hot-tempered dealings with other members on the issue, particularly Louis Bourdages, one of the leaders of the Parti canadien. In 1829, he was expelled from the Legislative Assembly, the first of five expulsions. However, the constituents of Gaspé continued to vote him back in. His opponents in the Assembly, notably leaders of the Parti canadien such as Bourdages and John Neilson, argued that the repeated expulsions amounted to a legal disqualification to be elected to the Assembly. However, his supporters in the Assembly argued that approach would place the Assembly over the wishes of the populace in choosing their representatives. The issue was referred to the Colonial Secretary, Viscount Goderich, who ruled in favour of Christie's continued eligibility for election to the Assembly.

The conflict with the Parti canadien and the expulsions was complicated by Christie's attempt to start a movement to separate the Gaspé from Lower Canada and join the province of New Brunswick. At the time, the Gaspé had a significant anglophone population. This proposal alienated the voters of the region and he was defeated by John Le Boutillier in a by-election in 1833, after his fifth expulsion from the Assembly. Christie temporarily retired from politics.

==== Summary of expulsions from the Assembly ====
Summary of expulsions
Elected in	Expulsion	Outcome
1827: general election	Expelled in 1827; seat declared vacant, February 14, 1829	Re-elected in by-election, April 16, 1829
1829: by-election	Expelled January 22, 1830	Re-elected in general election, 1830
1830: general election	Expelled January 31, 1831	Re-elected in by-election, March 21, 1831
1831: by-election	Expelled November 15, 1831	Re-elected in by-election, April 17, 1832
1833: by-election	Expelled November 15, 1832	John Le Boutillier elected in by-election

=== Province of Canada ===
Following the rebellion in Lower Canada, and the similar rebellion in 1837 in Upper Canada (now Ontario), the British government decided to merge the two provinces into a single province, as recommended by Lord Durham in the Durham Report. The Union Act, 1840, passed by the British Parliament, abolished the two provinces and their separate parliaments, and created the Province of Canada, with a single parliament for the entire province, composed of an elected Legislative Assembly and an appointed Legislative Council. The Governor General retained a strong position in the government.

In 1841, Christie stood for election in the first general election for the Legislative Assembly of the Province of Canada. He was unopposed and was elected by acclamation, again representing Gaspé. Once elected, Christie demonstrated an independent approach in the Assembly. He opposed the union of Upper Canada and Lower Canada, and was a consistent opponent of the Governor General, Lord Sydenham. Although not a strong supporter of responsible government, he voted with the Reform group on the disputes between them and the Governor-General.

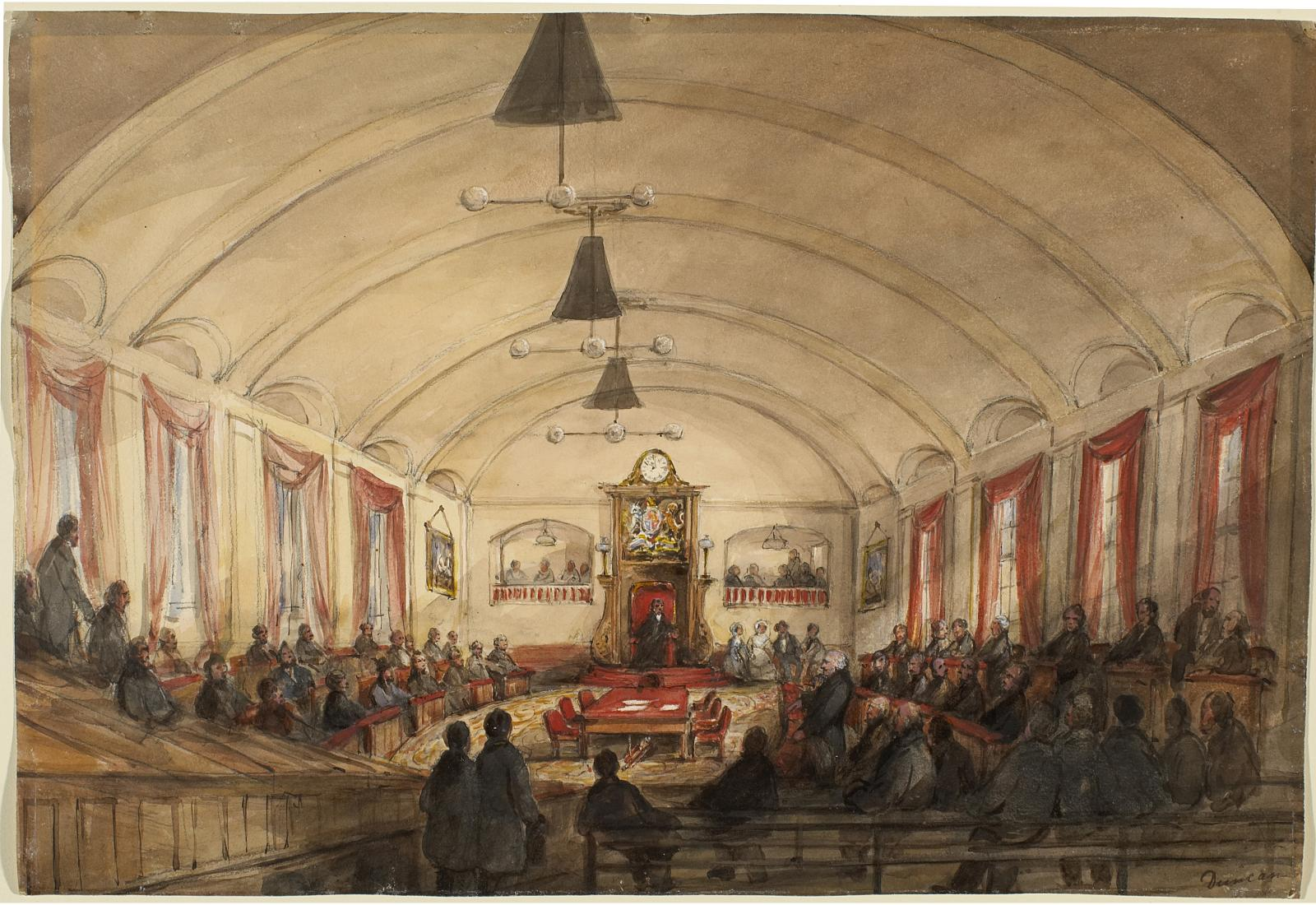
Chamber of the Parliament Building in Montreal, where the Parliament met from 1844 to 1849

One of the issues facing the new Province was the location of the capital. Governor General Lord Sydenham had directed that the capital would be Kingston in Canada West, and that was where the first and second parliaments were held. However, Canada East had a larger population than Canada West, and there was a strong feeling that the capital should be in the more populous province. Christie introduced the successful motion in 1842 to move the capital from Kingston to Montreal.

Throughout his time in office, Christie was a strong advocate for the interests of the Gaspé, including the land issue and also the administration of justice and registration of marriages. He was also an advocate for economy of government and the Assembly's control over public finances. He had strong opinions on many issues which came before the Assembly, but had erratic responses to them. Always quick-tempered, at one point he challenged another member to a duel.

Christie was committed to gathering and maintaining the public records of the province. He stated that “the history of a people is part of their public property,” and went to great lengths to preserve and obtain records relating to the government of Lower Canada, the former British province of Quebec, and the former French province of Canada. In 1844–1845, he was the driving force for the creation of a parliamentary committee, which he chaired, to inquire into the condition of records stored in government facilities, and took steps to acquire copies of relelvant documents from the archives of France and the state of New York. In 1846 and again in 1849 he urged the government to take steps to gather and preserve historical government documents, including judicial and parliamentary records, civil and military records of the government prior to the establishment of Lower Canada in 1791, and also the records of the Jesuits prior to their suppression in 1791.

He continued to represent the Gaspé region until 1854, when he was again defeated by Le Boutillier. By the end of his political career, he had a reputation for incorruptibility, as a result of his obvious honesty and outspokenness.

== Historical writings ==
During his period as editor of the Quebec Telegraph, Christie wrote commentaries on political events for the newspaper. The various articles became the foundation for a book, published in 1818, which reviewed the administrations of Sir James Henry Craig, and Sir George Prevost. Craig had been Governor General of British North America and Lieutenant Governor of Lower Canada from 1807 to 1811; Prevost from 1812 to 1815.

Christie followed with a second book two years later, covering the period of the next three governors, Sir Gordon Drummond, Sir John Coape Sherbrooke, and Charles Lennox, Duke of Richmond, from 1815 to 1820. A third volume appeared in 1829, covering the government of the Earl of Dalhousie.

Later in life, Christie returned to journalism, contributing articles to various newspapers and editing the Quebec Mercury from 1848 to 1850. At the same time, he began work on a six volume history of Lower Canada, focusing on political events from the creation of Lower Canada in 1791 until the union with Upper Canada in 1841. He incorporated material from his three earlier volumes on the administrations of the various governors-general, and also relied on contemporaneous documents, some of which are no longer available. From the time the text first came out, it was recognised as well-balanced, particularly compared to some other historical works at the time. Even Louis-Joseph Papineau, the leader of the Parti canadien, acknowledged that Christie accurately portrayed Papineau's role in the Lower Canada Rebellion, although he disagreed on some points of detail.

Fifty years later, this history was judged "one of the few works of importance written by English-Canadians during all these years". Although by modern standards the writing style is rather ornate and difficult, the work is considered detailed and impartial, and "thorough and enduring".

== Later life and legacy ==
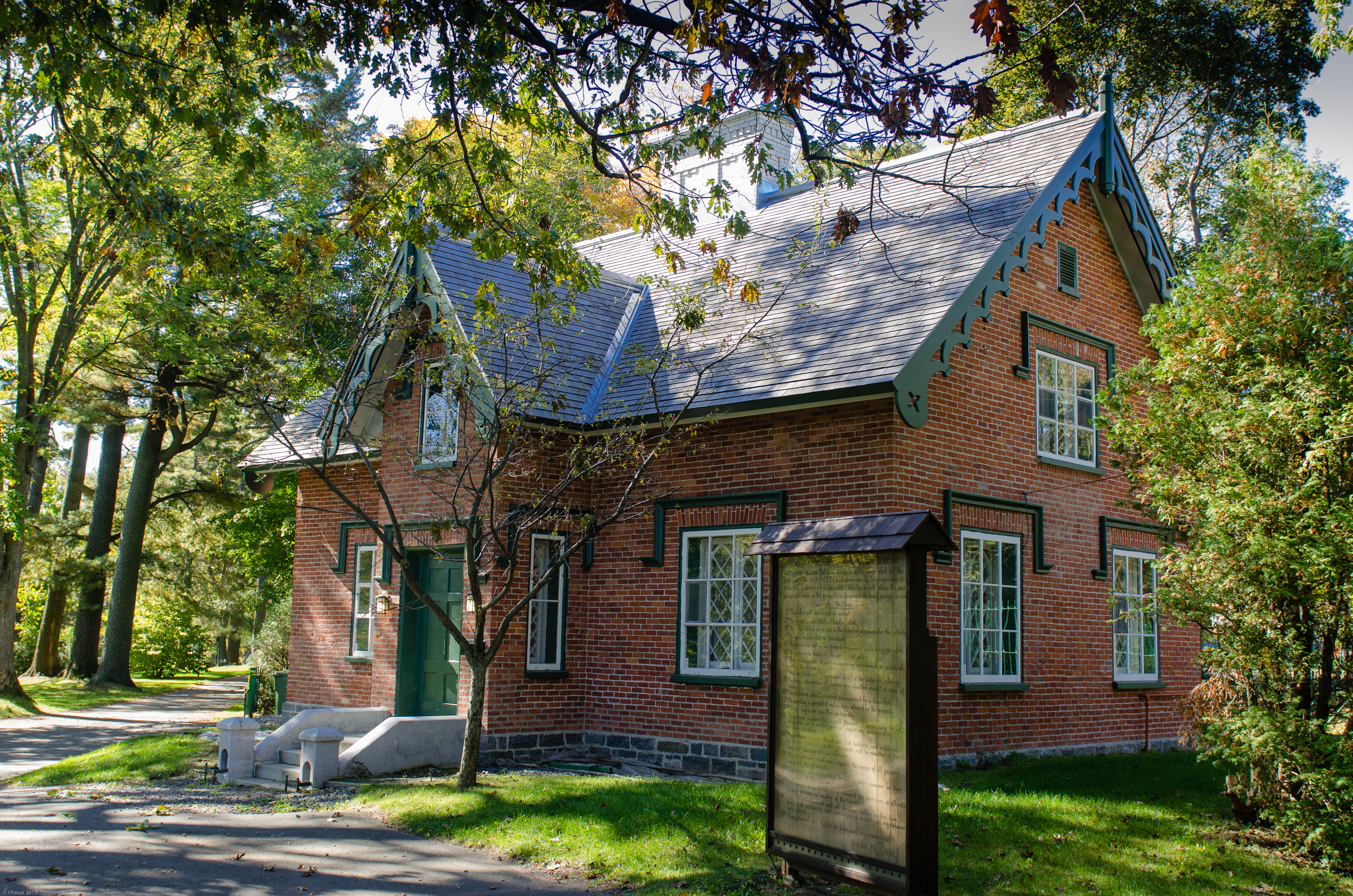
Entrance Lodge to Mount Hermon Cemetery, which Christie is buried

In later life, Christie grew increasingly irascible, but also mended fences with old political opponents, such as John Neilson, who had led the efforts to exclude Christie from the Legislative Assembly of Lower Canada. He also developed a close friendship with Papineau, and worked to have Papineau's pre-1837 salary as Speaker of the Assembly paid to him.

Christie died at Quebec City in 1856, and was buried at Mount Hermon Cemetery, the Anglican cemetery in Sillery.

In 1874, the township of Christie was created in the Gaspésie, named after Christie. The community of Christie is now part of a larger municipality, La Martre, Quebec.

In 1938, Christie was designated a National Historic Person by the federal government, with a commemorative plaque at his birthplace in Windsor, Nova Scotia.

== Works ==
- Memoirs Of The Administration of the Colonial Government Of Lower-Canada, By Sir James Henry Craig, And Sir George Prevost, from the Year 1807 until the Year 1815 : Comprehending the Military and Naval Operations in the Canadas during the Late War with the United States of America (Quebec: 1818)
- Memoirs of the administration of the government of Lower-Canada by Sir Gordon Drummond, Sir John Coape Sherbrooke, the late Duke of Richmond, James Monk, Esquire, and Sir Peregrine Maitland; continued from the 3d April, 1815 until the 18th June, 1820 (Quebec: New Printing House, 1820).
- Memoirs of the administration of the government of Lower Canada, by the Right Honorable the Earl of Dalhousie, G.C.B., comprehending a period of eight years, vizt: – from June, 1820 till September, 1828 (Quebec, 1829).
- A History of the Late Province of Lower Canada Parliamentary and Political, From the Commencement to the Close of Its Existence as a Separate Province, Embracing a Period of Fifty Years, that is to say, from the Erection of the Province, in 1791, to the Extinguishment thereof, in 1841, and Its Reunion with Upper Canada, by Act of the Imperial Parliament (Quebec and Montreal: various publishers, 1848–1855) (Internet Archive: All 6 volumes).

== See also ==
1st Parliament of the Province of Canada
