= Pabo =

Pabo may refer to:

== Personal name ==
- Pabo Post Prydain (fl. c. 500?), northern British king
- Pabo, supposed founder of Llanbabo, Anglesey
- Pabo, abbot of St. Emmeram's Abbey

== Geographic name ==
- Pabbo, a town in northern Uganda
- Pabo, Uttarakhand, a community development block of Uttarakhand state of India
- Pabo, a crater on Mars

== Music ==
- Pabo, a Japanese female idol group created for the variety show Quiz! Hexagon II

== See also ==
- Pabos (disambiguation)
