= Mont-Alexandre =

- Unorganized territory
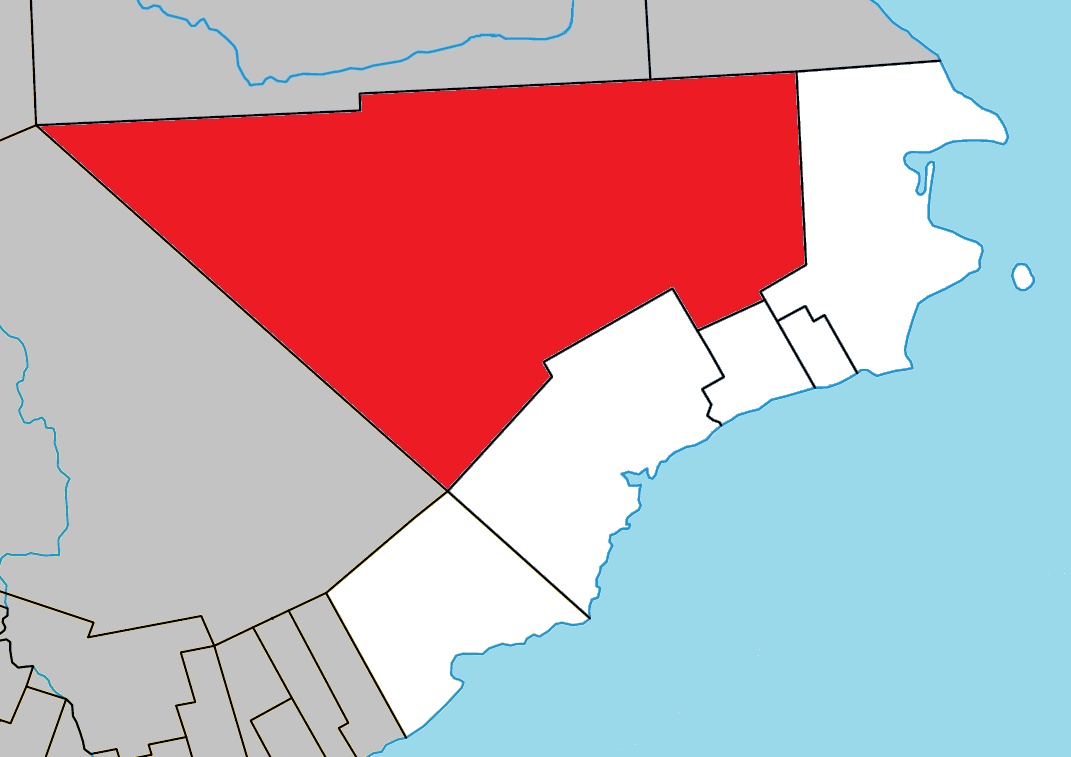
- Location within Le Rocher-Percé RCM

- Location in eastern Quebec
- Coordinates: 48°37′N 65°09′W
- Country: Canada
- Province: Quebec
- Region: Gaspésie–Îles-de-la-Madeleine
- RCM: Le Rocher-Percé
- Constituted: January 1, 1986

Government
  - Federal riding: Gaspésie—Les Îles-de-la-Madeleine—Listuguj
  - Prov. riding: Gaspé

Area
  - Total: 1,807.5 km^{2} (697.9 sq mi)
  - Land: 1,800.87 km^{2} (695.32 sq mi)

Population (2021)
  - Total: 0
  - Density: 0/km^{2} (0/sq mi)
  - Pop (2016-21): 0.0%
  - Dwellings: 0
- Time zone: UTC−05:00 (EST)
  - Summer (DST): UTC−04:00 (EDT)
- Highways: No major routes

Mont-Alexandre is an unorganized territory in the Gaspésie–Îles-de-la-Madeleine region of Quebec, Canada.

The eponymous Mount Alexandre is located in the territory 70 kilometres (43 mi) west of Percé. This 760 metres (2,490 ft) peak was named after an Indian trapper, Alexander, who visited the area in the first half of the 19th century.

The Grande-Rivière Ecological Reserve (French: Réserve écologique de la Grande-Rivière) and the Zec de la Grande-Rivière are within this territory.

== Demographics ==
Historical Census Data - Mont-Alexandre, Quebec

Year	Pop.
1991	0
1996	0
2001	0
2006	0

Year	Pop.
2011	0
2016	0
2021	0

Source: Statistics Canada

== See also ==
- List of unorganized territories in Quebec
