= Sainte-Thérèse-de-Gaspé =

- Municipality
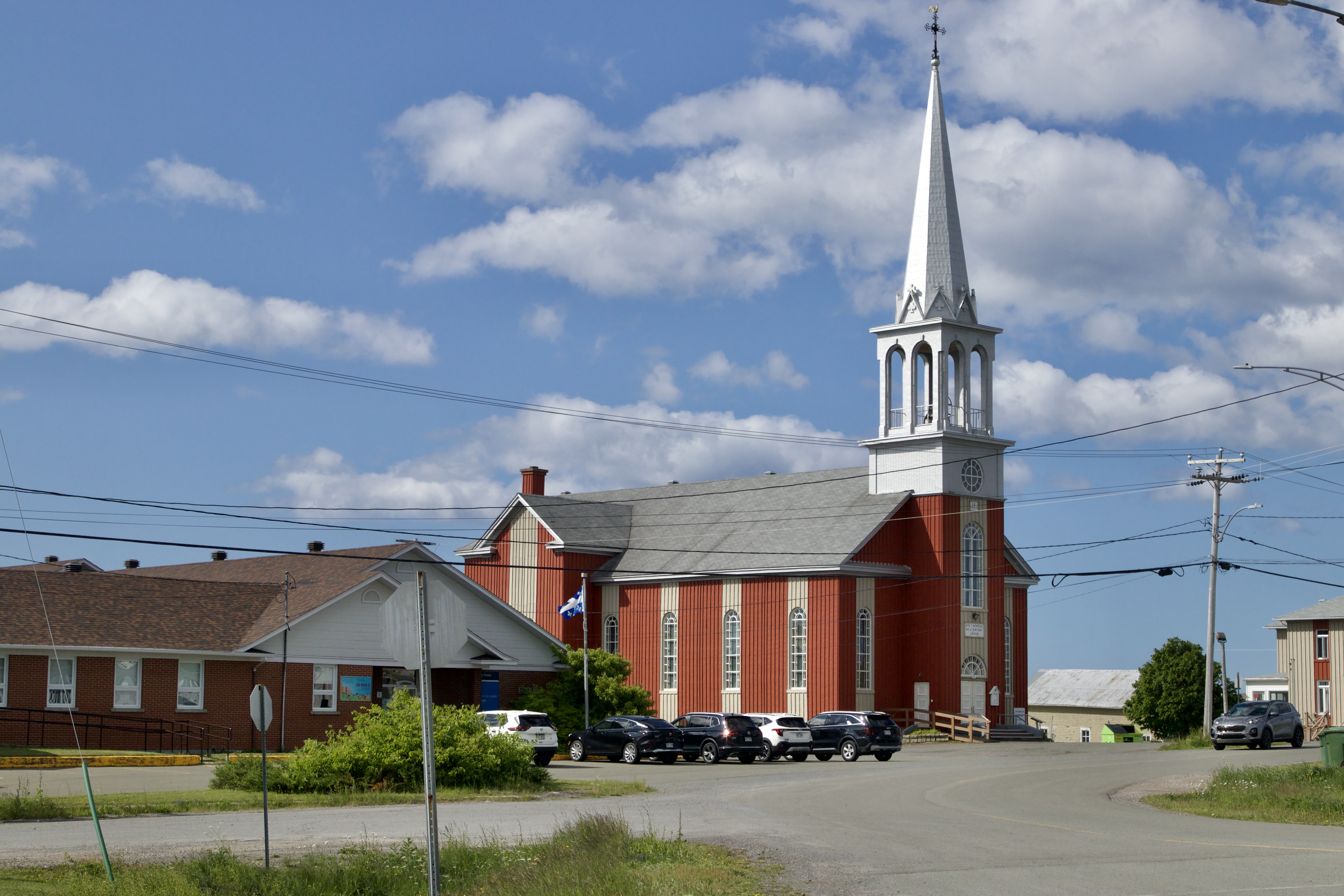
- Church of Sainte-Thérèse-de-Gaspé

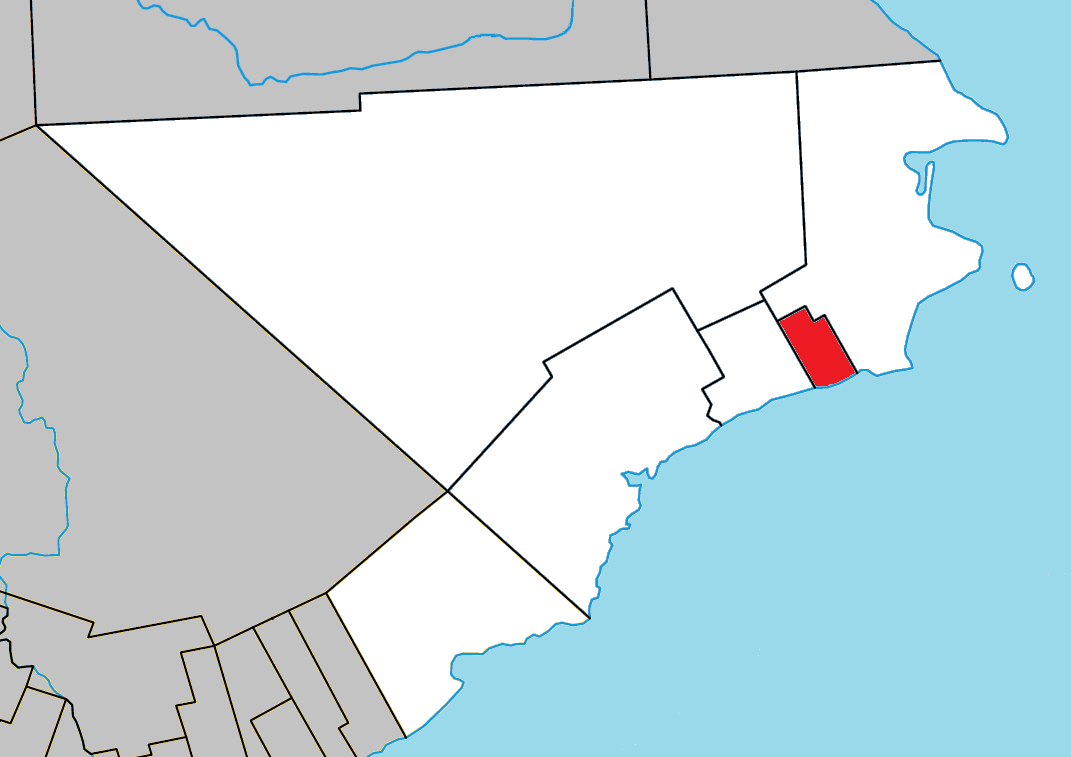
- Location within Le Rocher-Percé RCM

- Location in eastern Quebec
- Coordinates: 48°25′N 64°25′W
- Country: Canada
- Province: Quebec
- Region: Gaspésie–Îles-de-la-Madeleine
- RCM: Le Rocher-Percé
- Constituted: September 6, 1930

Government
  - Mayor: Roberto Blondin
  - Federal riding: Gaspésie—Les Îles-de-la-Madeleine—Listuguj
  - Prov. riding: Gaspé

Area
  - Total: 34.94 km^{2} (13.49 sq mi)
  - Land: 34.45 km^{2} (13.30 sq mi)

Population (2021)
  - Total: 979
  - Density: 28.4/km^{2} (74/sq mi)
  - Pop (2016-21): ▼3.5%
  - Dwellings: 504
- Time zone: UTC−5 (EST)
  - Summer (DST): UTC−4 (EDT)
- Postal code(s): G0C 3B0
- Area codes: 418 and 581
- Highways: R-132
- Website: www.saintetheresedegaspe.com

Sainte-Thérèse-de-Gaspé (French pronunciation: [sɛ̃t teʁɛz də ɡaspe]) is a municipality in the Gaspésie-Îles-de-la-Madeleine region of the province of Quebec in Canada. It is the smallest municipality, in land area and population, of the Le Rocher-Percé Regional County Municipality.

Fishing is its primary business, and its harbour handles the fourth highest value of seafood in Quebec. Its factories, employing hundreds of people, process snow crab, rock crab, and lobster.

In addition to the village of Sainte-Thérèse-de-Gaspé itself, the municipality also includes the community of Saint-Isidore.

== Demographics ==
=== Population ===
Canada census – Sainte-Thérèse-de-Gaspé community profile

	2021	2016	2011
Population	979 (-3.5% from 2016)	1,015 (-3.8% from 2011)	1,055 (-4.9% from 2006)
Land area	34.45 km^{2} (13.30 sq mi)	34.41 km^{2} (13.29 sq mi)	33.50 km^{2} (12.93 sq mi)
Population density	28.4/km^{2} (74/sq mi)	29.5/km^{2} (76/sq mi)	31.5/km^{2} (82/sq mi)
Median age	56.4 (M: 55.6, F: 56.8)	53.6 (M: 53.6, F: 53.6)	50.5 (M: 49.9, F: 51.1)
Private dwellings	504 (total) 475 (occupied)	509 (total)	470 (total)
Median household income	$65,000	$54,144	$36,496

References: 2021 2016 2011

Historical Census Data - Sainte-Thérèse-de-Gaspé, Quebec

Year	Pop.	±%
1931	1,045	—
1941	1,137	+8.8%
1951	1,276	+12.2%
1956	1,433	+12.3%
1961	1,394	−2.7%
1966	1,415	+1.5%

Year	Pop.	±%
1971	1,356	−4.2%
1976	1,243	−8.3%
1981	1,235	−0.6%
1986	1,273	+3.1%
1991	1,280	+0.5%
1996	1,262	−1.4%

Year	Pop.	±%
2001	1,165	−7.7%
2006	1,109	−4.8%
2011	1,055	−4.9%
2016	1,015	−3.8%
2021	979	−3.5%

Source: Statistics Canada

=== Language ===
Canada Census Mother Tongue - Sainte-Thérèse-de-Gaspé, Quebec
Census	Total	French			English			French & English			Other		
Year	Responses	Count	Trend	Pop %	Count	Trend	Pop %	Count	Trend	Pop %	Count	Trend	Pop %
2021	980	955	▼4.0%	97.4%	5	0.0%	0.5%	5	0.0%	0.5%	10	▲100.0%	1.0%
2016	1,005	995	▼4.3%	99.0%	5	0.0%	0.5%	5	0.0%	0.5%	5	0.0%	0.5%
2011	1,055	1,040	0.0%	98.6%	5	▼50.0%	0.5%	5	▲ n/a%	0.5%	5	▼87.5%	0.5%
2006	1,090	1,040	▼8.8%	95.4%	10	0.0%	0.9%	0	0.0%	0.0%	40	▲ n/a%	3.7%
2001	1,150	1,140	▼10.6%	99.1%	10	0.0%	0.9%	0	0.0%	0.0%	0	0.0%	0.0%
1996	1,285	1,275	n/a	99.2%	10	n/a	0.8%	0	n/a	0.0%	0	n/a	0.0%

== See also ==
- List of municipalities in Quebec
