= Grande-Rivière, Quebec =

Grande-Rivière
- City
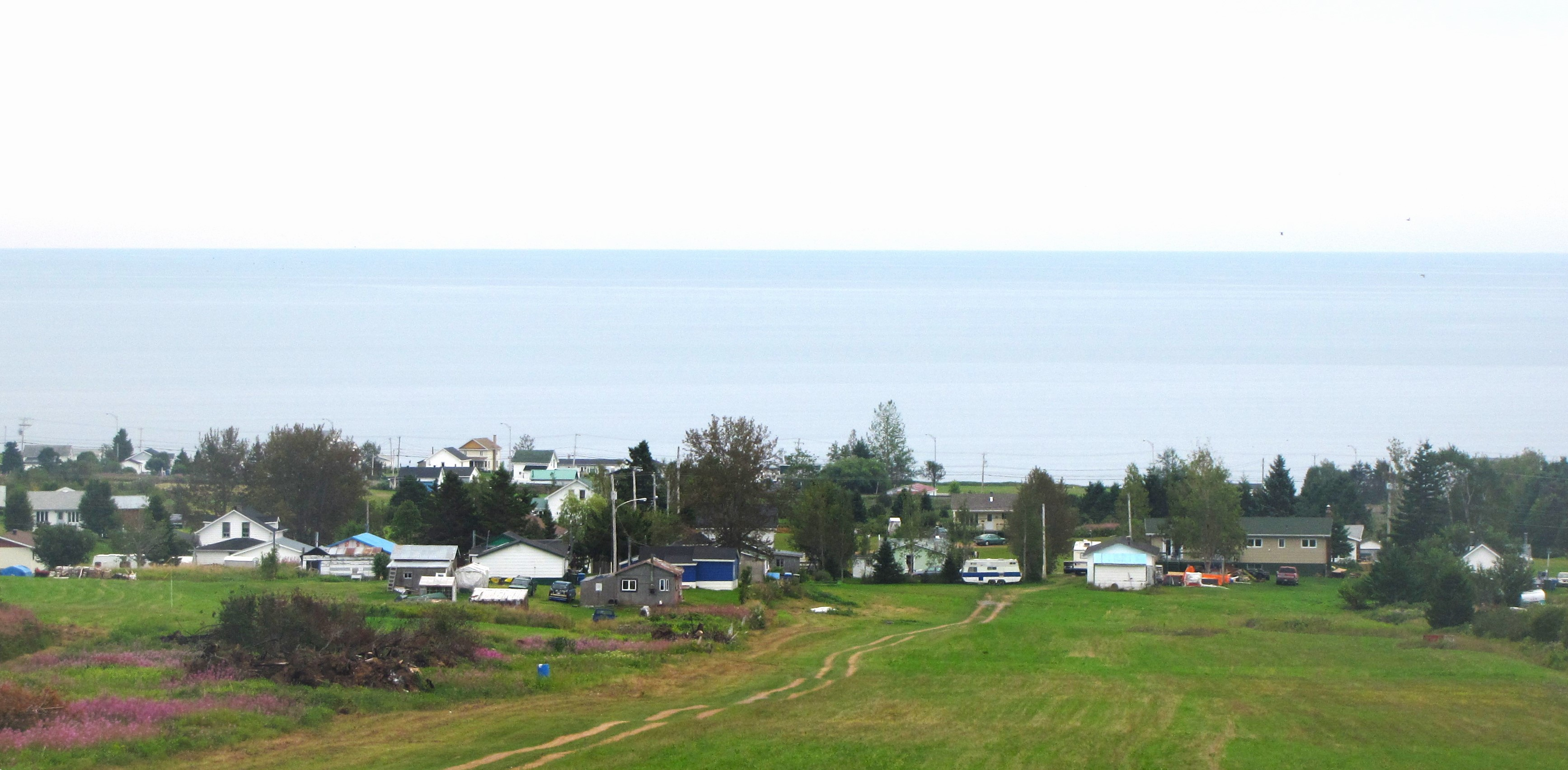

- Coat of arms

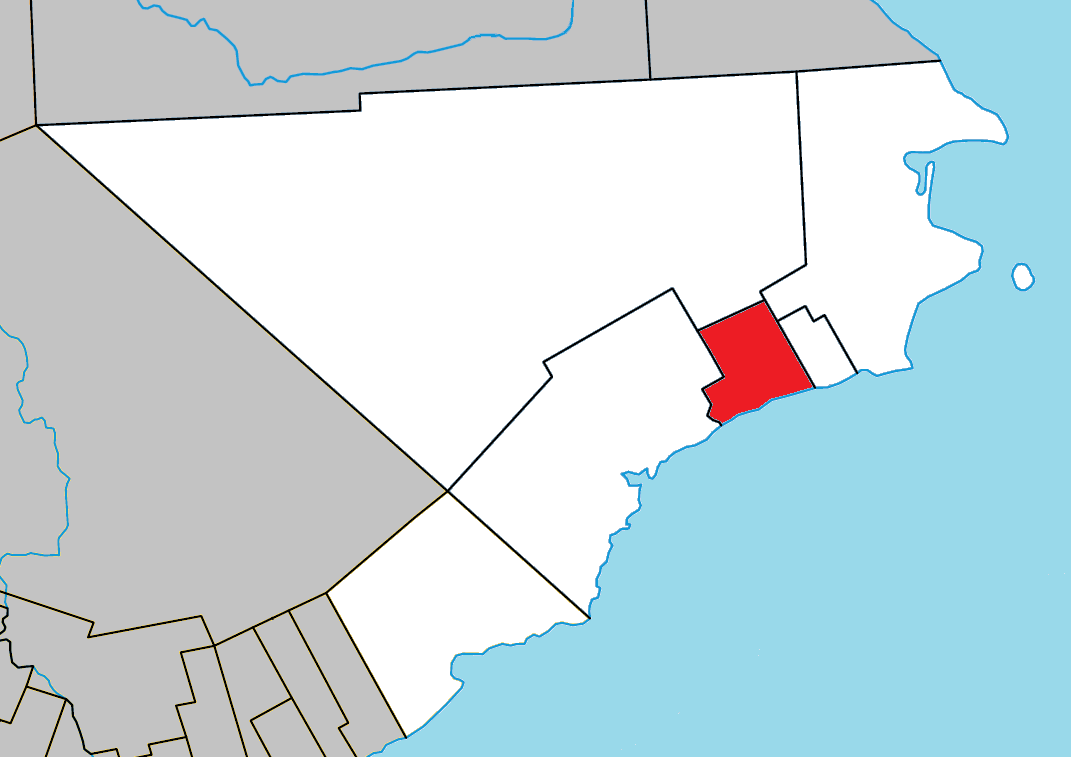
- Location within Le Rocher-Percé RCM

- Location in eastern Quebec
- Coordinates: 48°24′N 64°30′W
- Country: Canada
- Province: Quebec
- Region: Gaspésie–Îles-de-la-Madeleine
- RCM: Le Rocher-Percé
- Constituted: September 21, 1974

Government
  - Mayor: Gino Cyr
  - Federal riding: Gaspésie—Les Îles-de-la-Madeleine—Listuguj
  - Prov. riding: Gaspé

Area
  - Total: 105.89 km^{2} (40.88 sq mi)
  - Land: 87.92 km^{2} (33.95 sq mi)
  - Urban: 3.31 km^{2} (1.28 sq mi)

Population (2021)
  - Total: 3,384
  - Density: 38.5/km^{2} (100/sq mi)
  - Urban: 1,330
  - Urban density: 401.3/km^{2} (1,039/sq mi)
  - Pop (2016-21): ▼0.7%
  - Dwellings: 1,723
- Time zone: UTC−5 (EST)
  - Summer (DST): UTC−4 (EDT)
- Postal code(s): G0C 1V0
- Area codes: 418 and 581
- Highways: R-132
- Website: villegranderiviere.ca

Grande-Rivière (French pronunciation: [ɡʁɑ̃d ʁivjɛʁ], literally Great River) is a city in the Gaspésie-Îles-de-la-Madeleine region of the province of Québec in Canada.

In addition to Grande-Rivière itself at the mouth of the namesake Grand River, the town's territory also includes the communities of Grande-Rivière-Ouest, Petite-Rivière-Ouest, and Petit Pabos.

Its economy is based on the fishing industry. It is home to two processing plants, as well as offices of the provincial Ministry of Agriculture, Fisheries and Food and federal Department of Fisheries and Oceans. The Marine Agricultural Centre is also located there.

== History ==
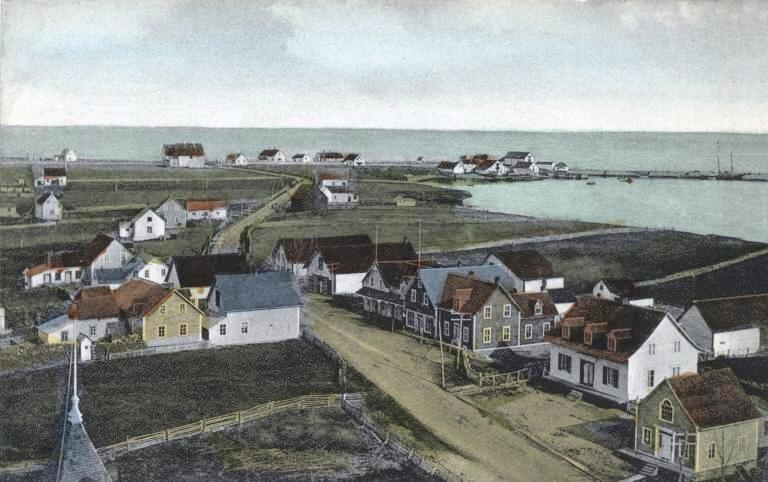
Grande-Rivière in 1910

In 1697, Jacques Cochu was granted the seignory of Grande-Rivière, named after the namesake river that drains there into the Gulf of St. Lawrence. By the middle of the 18th century, about 70 families were living there, but in 1758, the place was destroyed by General James Wolfe's army during the Gulf of St. Lawrence campaign during the French and Indian War.

By 1795, the seignory was owned by Charles Robin, whose company established fishery operations in Grande-Rivière, opening a fish processing plant in 1828.

In 1840, the Parish of Assomption-de-Notre-Dame-de-la-Grande-Rivière was founded. In 1845, the Municipality of Grande-Rivière was created, abolished in 1847, and reestablished in 1855. In 1853, its post office opened under the English name Grand River (Francized in 1933).

On December 19, 1931, the main population centre split off to form the separate Village Municipality of Grande-Rivière, but it was annexed into the Municipality of Grande-Rivière on February 1, 1967.

On September 21, 1974, the City (Ville) of Grande-Rivière was formed through the merger of the Municipality of Grande-Rivière, the Municipality of Grande-Rivière-Ouest (founded in 1932 as Petite-Rivière-Ouest), and the Municipality of Petit-Pabos (founded in 1955).

== Demographics ==
In the 2021 Census of Population conducted by Statistics Canada, Grande-Rivière had a population of 3,384 living in 1,643 of its 1,723 total private dwellings, a change of −0.7% from its 2016 population of 3,408. With a land area of 87.92 km^{2} (33.95 sq mi), it had a population density of 38.5/km^{2} (99.7/sq mi) in 2021.

Canada census – Grande-Rivière community profile

	2021	2016	2011
Population	3,384 (-0.7% from 2016)	3,408 (-1.4% from 2011)	3,456 (+1.4% from 2006)
Land area	87.92 km^{2} (33.95 sq mi)	87.86 km^{2} (33.92 sq mi)	87.49 km^{2} (33.78 sq mi)
Population density	38.5/km^{2} (100/sq mi)	38.8/km^{2} (100/sq mi)	39.5/km^{2} (102/sq mi)
Median age	55.6 (M: 54.8, F: 56.0)	47.9 (M: 47.4, F: 48.4)	48.7 (M: 48.8, F: 48.6)
Private dwellings	1,723 (total) 1,643 (occupied)	1,701 (total)	1,566 (total)
Median household income	$60,400	$45,751	$37,493

References: 2021 2016 2011

Historical Census Data - Grande-Rivière (ville)

Year	Pop.	±%
1976	4,390	—
1981	4,420	+0.7%
1986	4,413	−0.2%
1991	3,979	−9.8%
1996	3,888	−2.3%

Year	Pop.	±%
2001	3,556	−8.5%
2006	3,409	−4.1%
2011	3,456	+1.4%
2016	3,408	−1.4%
2021	3,384	−0.7%

Source: Statistics Canada

Historical Census Data - Grande-Rivière (municipalité)

Year	Pop.	±%
1921	2,059	—
1931	1,981	−3.8%
1941	524	−73.5%
1951	616	+17.6%

Year	Pop.	±%
1956	615	−0.2%
1961	704	+14.5%
1966	772	+9.7%
1971	2,114	+173.8%

Population counts are not adjusted for boundary changes.
Source: Statistics Canada

Canada Census Mother Tongue - Grande-Rivière, Quebec
Census	Total	French			English			French & English			Other		
Year	Responses	Count	Trend	Pop %	Count	Trend	Pop %	Count	Trend	Pop %	Count	Trend	Pop %
2021	3,380	3,300	▼1.0%	97.6%	40	▼11.1%	1.2%	15	▲50.0%	0.4%	30	▲100.0%	0.9%
2016	3,405	3,335	▼1.6%	97.9%	45	▲12.5%	1.3%	10	0.0%	0.3%	15	▲50.0%	0.4%
2011	3,450	3,390	▲2.0%	98.3%	40	▲14.3%	1.2%	10	▲ n/a%	0.3%	10	▼77.8%	0.3%
2006	3,405	3,325	▼5.4%	97.7%	35	▲75.0%	1.0%	0	▼100.0%	0.0%	45	▲350.0%	1.3%
2001	3,555	3,515	▼7.6%	98.9%	20	▼71.4%	0.6%	10	▼33.3%	0.3%	10	▲ n/a%	0.3%
1996	3,890	3,805	n/a	97.8%	70	n/a	1.8%	15	n/a	0.4%	0	n/a	0.0%

== Government ==
List of former mayors:

- Romuald Boutin (...–2009)
- Bernard Stevens (2009–2017)
- Gino Cyr (2017–present)

== Attractions ==
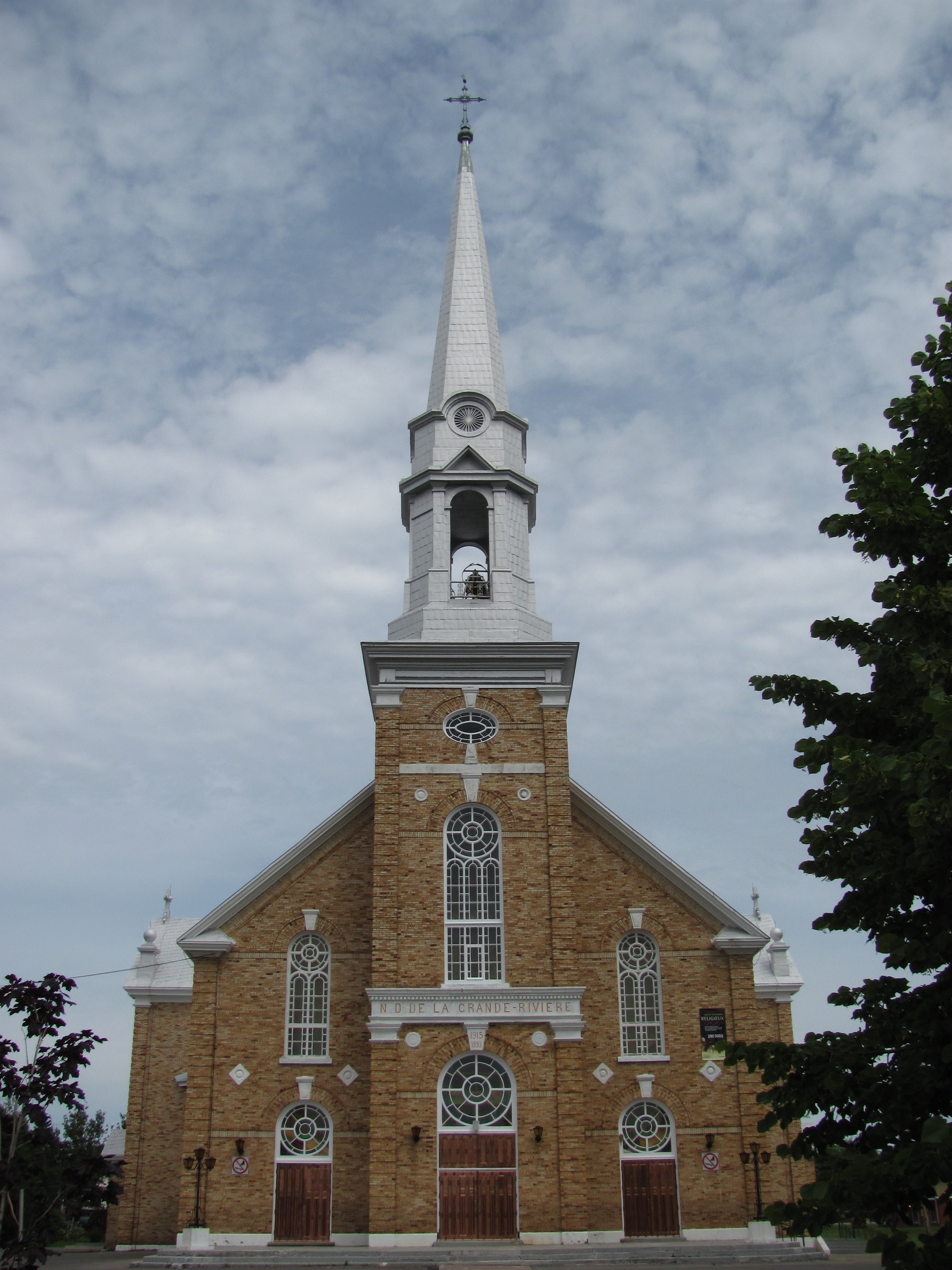
Église de Notre-Dame-de-l'Assomption

L'Église de Notre-Dame-de-l'Assomption is a large Roman Catholic church with 1,500 seats, which was completed in 1893. The church has a Casavant organ dating from 1954.

== Education ==
The Cégep de la Gaspésie et des Îles operates its École des pêches et de l’aquaculture du Québec (Quebec School of Fisheries and Aquaculture) in Grande-Rivière.

== See also ==
- List of cities in Quebec
- Zec de la Grande-Rivière
