= Le Rocher-Percé Regional County Municipality =

Le Rocher-Percé
- Regional county municipality

- Coordinates: 48°22′N 64°37′W
- Country: Canada
- Province: Quebec
- Region: Gaspésie–Îles-de-la-Madeleine
- Effective: April 1, 1981
- County seat: Chandler

Government
  - Type: Prefecture
  - Prefect: Samuel Parisé

Area
  - Total: 3,276.893 km^{2} (1,265.215 sq mi)
  - Land: 3,074.80 km^{2} (1,187.19 sq mi)

Population (2021)
  - Total: 17,219
  - Density: 5.6/km^{2} (15/sq mi)
  - Change (2016-21): ▼0.4%
  - Dwellings: 9,110
- Time zone: UTC−5 (EST)
  - Summer (DST): UTC−4 (EDT)
- Area codes: 418 and 581
- Website: www.mrcrocherperce.qc.ca

Le Rocher-Percé (French pronunciation: [lə ʁɔʃe pɛʁse]) is a regional county municipality in the Gaspésie–Îles-de-la-Madeleine region of Quebec, Canada. Its seat is Chandler. Prior to July 17, 1999, it was known as Pabok Regional County Municipality.

It is named after Percé Rock (the pierced rock), a massive arched sandstone rock rising from the Atlantic just off the tip of the Gaspé peninsula. The region includes the towns of Percé, Grande-Rivière, Port-Daniel–Gascons and Chandler. Major tourist attractions include the Percé Rock and Bonaventure Island.

== Subdivisions ==
There are six subdivisions within the RCM:

Cities & towns (3)

- Chandler
- Grande-Rivière
- Percé

Municipalities (2)

- Port-Daniel–Gascons
- Sainte-Thérèse-de-Gaspé

Unorganized territory (1)

- Mont-Alexandre

== Demographics ==
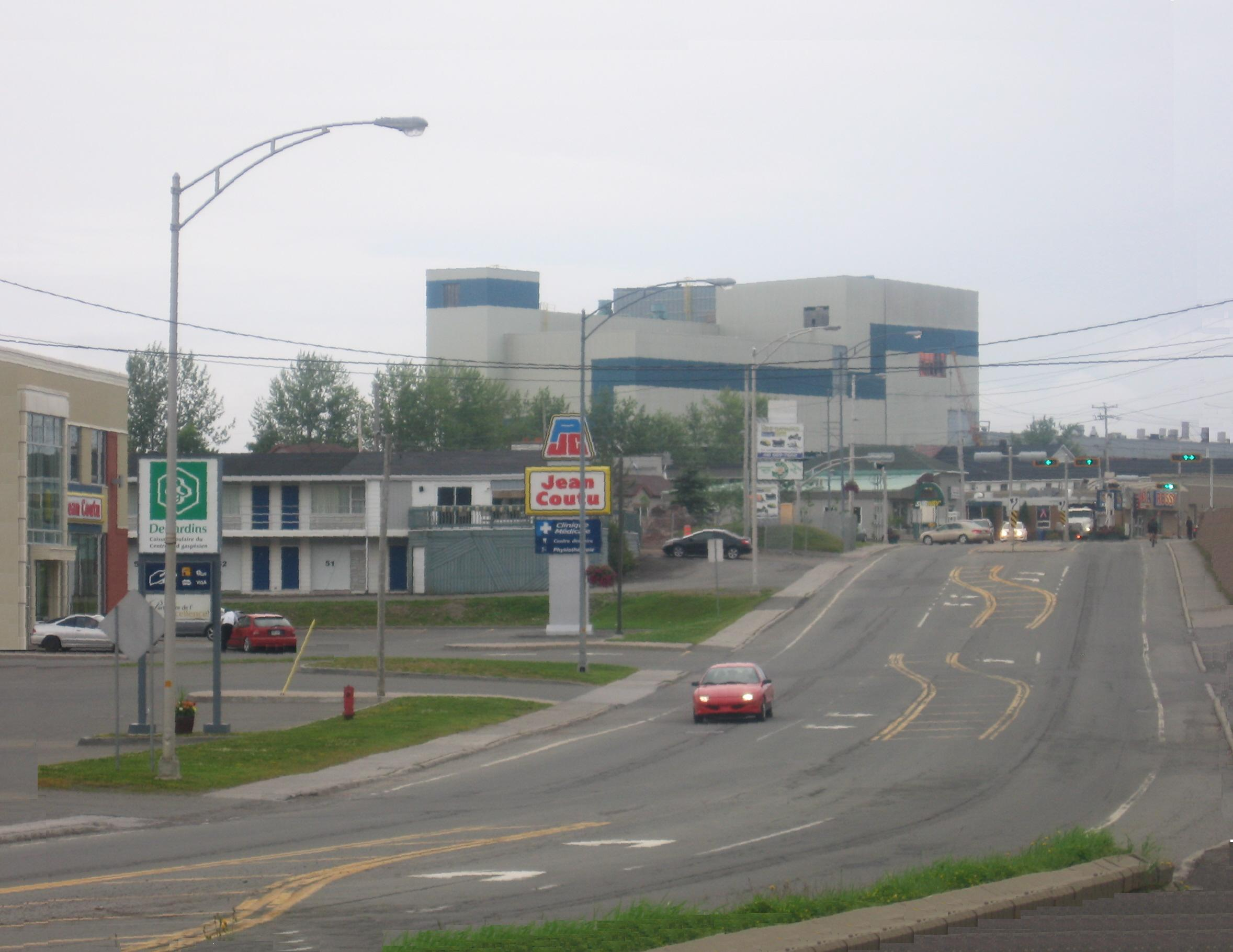
Chandler

=== Population ===
Canada census – Le Rocher-Percé community profile

	2021	2016	2011
Population	17,219 (-0.4% from 2016)	17,282 (-3.9% from 2011)	17,979 (-2.5% from 2006)
Land area	3,074.80 km^{2} (1,187.19 sq mi)	3,076.80 km^{2} (1,187.96 sq mi)	3,077.81 km^{2} (1,188.35 sq mi)
Population density	5.6/km^{2} (15/sq mi)	5.6/km^{2} (15/sq mi)	5.8/km^{2} (15/sq mi)
Median age	56.0 (M: 55.2, F: 57.2)	53.9 (M: 53.2, F: 54.7)	50.6 (M: 50.0, F: 51.3)
Private dwellings	9,110 (total) 8,319 (occupied)	8,969 (total)	8,622 (total)
Median household income	$59,600	$47,957	$38,549

References: 2021 2016 2011

Historical census data - Le Rocher-Percé Regional County Municipality, Quebec

Year	Pop.	±%
1991	21,713	—
1996	21,340	−1.7%
2001	19,298	−9.6%

Year	Pop.	±%
2006	18,437	−4.5%
2011	17,979	−2.5%
2016	17,282	−3.9%

=== Language ===
Canada Census mother tongue - Le Rocher-Percé Regional County Municipality, Quebec
Census	Total	French			English			French & English			Other		
Year	Responses	Count	Trend	Pop %	Count	Trend	Pop %	Count	Trend	Pop %	Count	Trend	Pop %
2016	17,100	15,680	▼4.0%	91.7%	1,235	▼10.8%	7.2%	110	▼4.3%	0.6%	75	▲66.7%	0.4%
2011	17,870	16,325	▼2.1%	91.35%	1,385	▲5.3%	7.75%	115	▲283.3%	0.64%	45	▼81.6%	0.25%
2006	18,265	16,675	▼5.4%	91.29%	1,315	▼8.0%	7.20%	30	▼66.7%	0.16%	245	▲716.7%	1.34%
2001	19,170	17,620	▼8.8%	91.91%	1,430	▼13.6%	7.46%	90	▼60.0%	0.47%	30	▼14.3%	0.16%
1996	21,230	19,315	n/a	90.98%	1,655	n/a	7.80%	225	n/a	1.06%	35	n/a	0.16%

== Transportation ==
=== Access routes ===
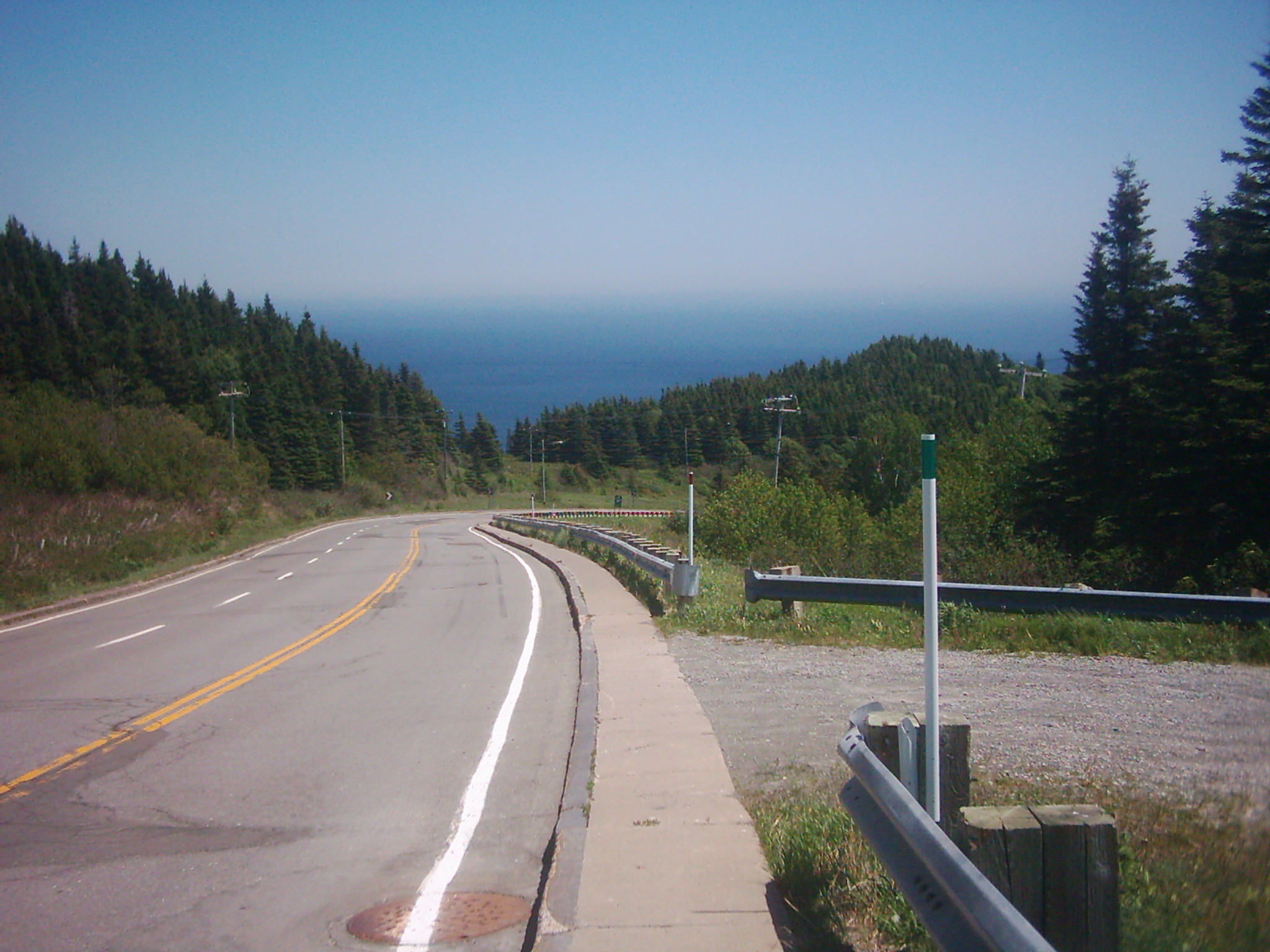
Quebec Route 132 near Percé

Highways and numbered routes that run through the municipality, including external routes that start or finish at the county border:

- Autoroutes
  - None
- Principal highways
  - R-132
- Secondary highways
  - None
- External routes
  - None

== See also ==
- List of regional county municipalities and equivalent territories in Quebec
