= Chandler, Quebec =

Chandler
- City
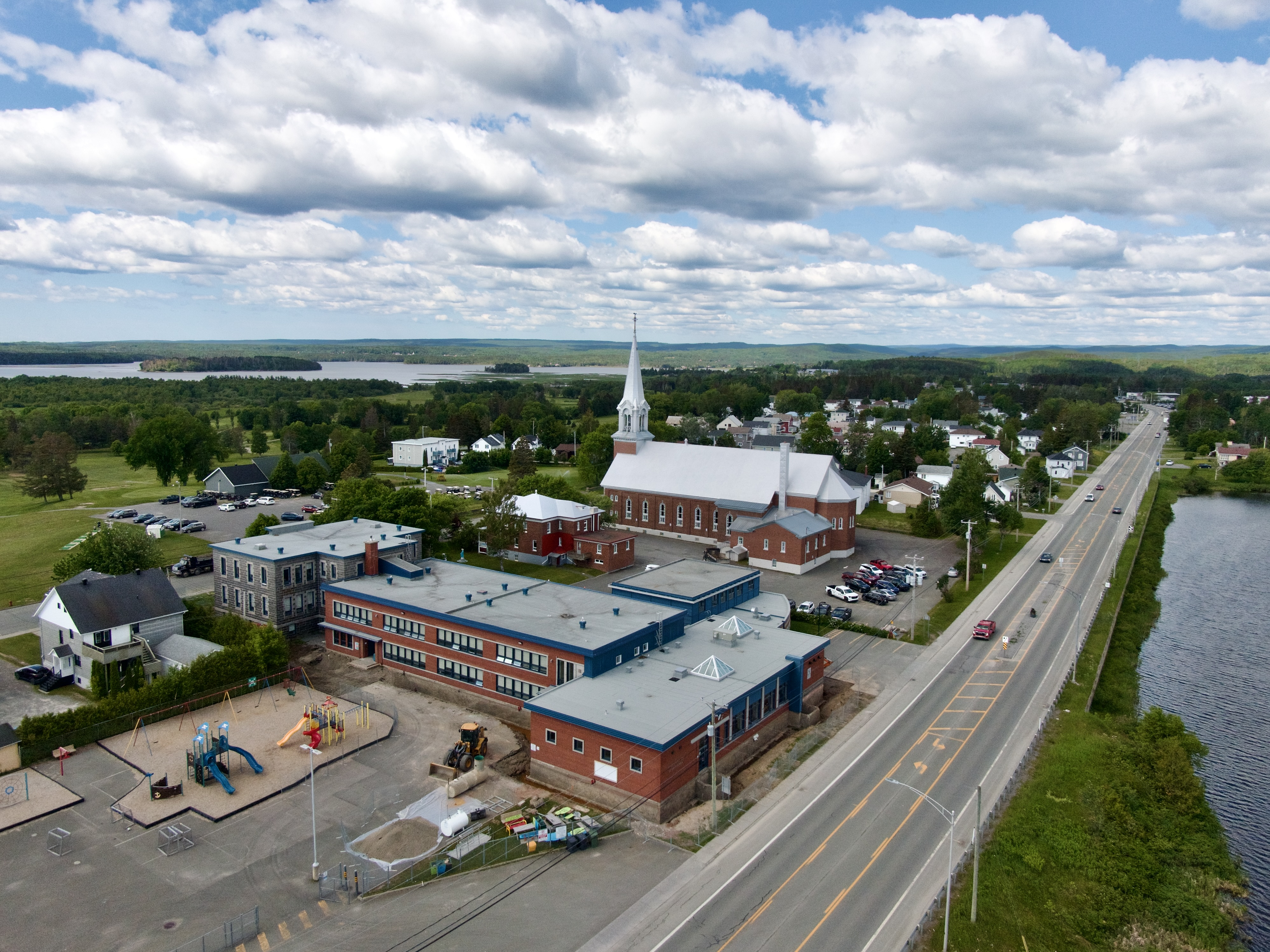

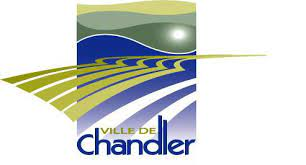
- Seal

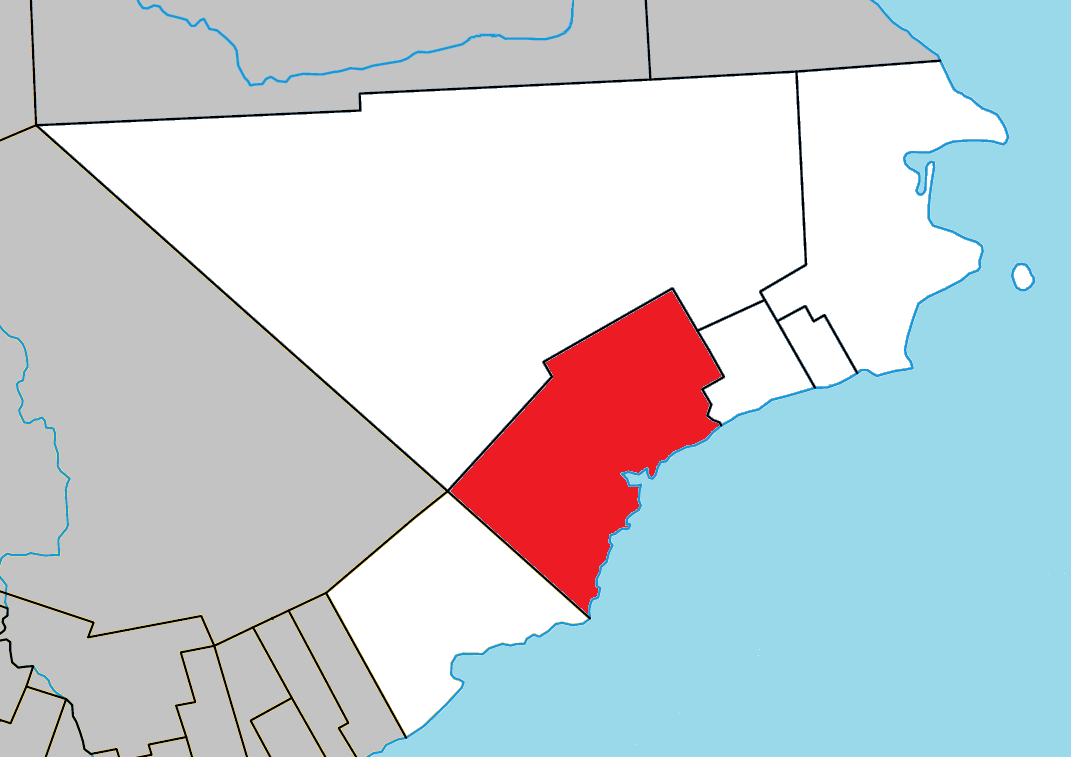
- Location within Le Rocher-Percé RCM

- Location in eastern Quebec
- Coordinates: 48°21′N 64°41′W
- Country: Canada
- Province: Quebec
- Region: Gaspésie–Îles-de-la-Madeleine
- RCM: Le Rocher-Percé
- Settled: 1729
- Constituted: June 27, 2001

Government
  - Mayor: Gilles Daraiche
  - Federal riding: Gaspésie—Les Îles-de-la-Madeleine—Listuguj
  - Prov. riding: Bonaventure

Area
  - Total: 438.77 km^{2} (169.41 sq mi)
  - Land: 418.45 km^{2} (161.56 sq mi)

Population (2021)
  - Total: 7,490
  - Density: 17.9/km^{2} (46/sq mi)
  - Pop (2016–21): ▼0.7%
  - Dwellings: 3,794
- Time zone: UTC−5 (EST)
  - Summer (DST): UTC−4 (EDT)
- Postal code(s): G0C 1K0
- Area codes: 418 and 581
- Highways: R-132
- Website: www.villedechandler.com

Chandler (French pronunciation: [tʃandlɚ, -lœʁ]) is a town in the Gaspésie–Îles-de-la-Madeleine region of Quebec, Canada. It is the second-most populous town on the Gaspé Peninsula after the Town of Gaspé. It was known as Pabos between June 27, 2001, and May 4, 2002.

The city is the birthplace of NHL player Mathieu Garon, Quebec politician Joseph-Léonard Duguay, singer "La Bolduc" (Mary Rose Anna Travers) and world curling champion John Kawaja.

In addition to Chandler itself, the town's territory also includes the communities of Newport, Grand-Pabos-Ouest, Pabos, Pabos Mills, and Saint-François-de-Pabos. Chandler's major industries include fishing and tourism.

== History ==
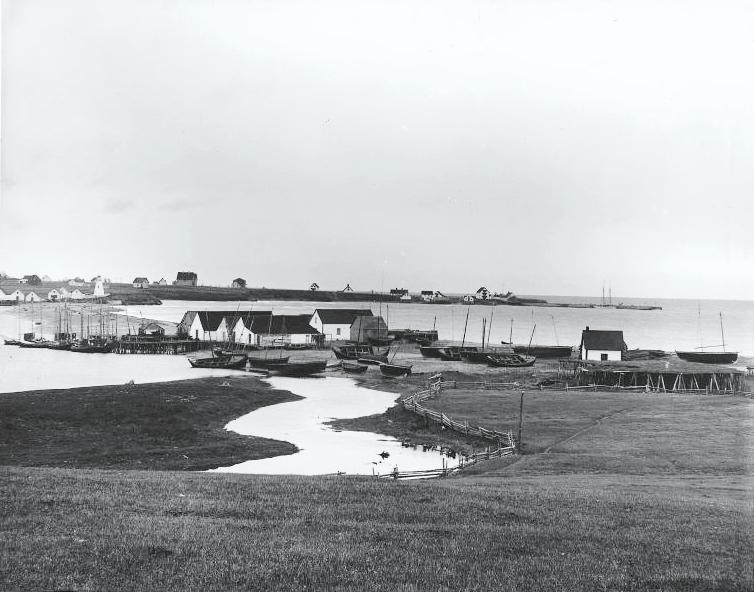
Grand-Pabos in 1900

The area was first settled in 1729, making it one of the oldest places on the Gaspé coast. It was known over time as Paboc, Pabo, Pabok, Pabeau, and Pas-bos. In 1815, the final spelling of Pabos was assigned in the Description topographique de la province du Bas Canada (Topographical Description of the province of Lower Canada). The meaning of this name is uncertain, although there are various theories: from the Mi'kmaq word papôg (meaning "playful waters"); a Basque name; from the Spanish pavo; a place in France, home of the first seignoral lord; or from the French words pas[sage] beau (meaning "beautiful passage").

In 1758, the settlement was destroyed by General James Wolfe during his Gulf of St. Lawrence Campaign. It was rebuilt and by 1860, the Parish of Sainte-Adélaïde-de-Pabos was formed. In 1876, it had become the most important civil and religious town in the Gaspésie region, and the place was incorporated as the Municipality of Pabos. 3 years later, its post office opened.

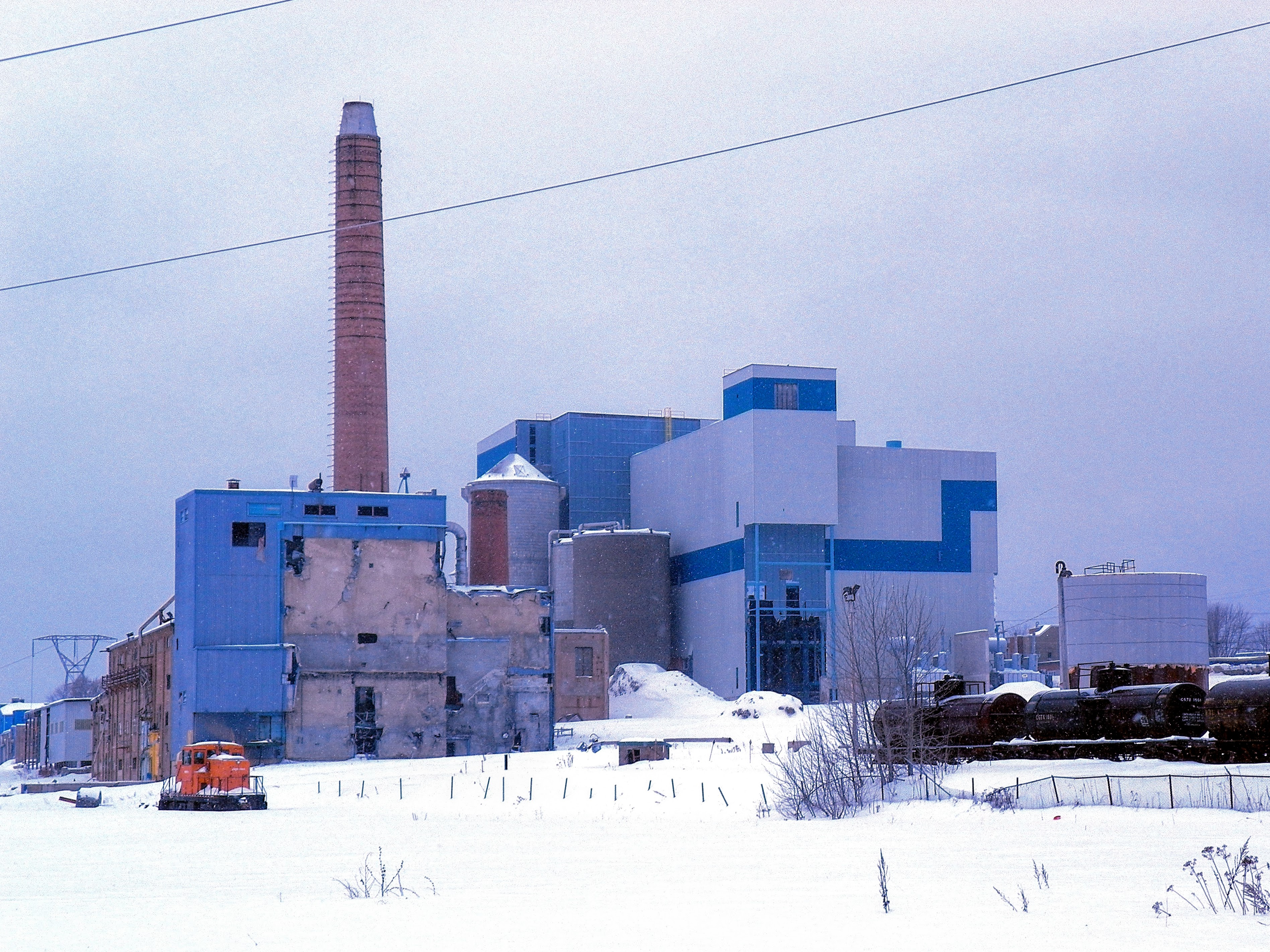
Dismantling of the Gaspésia Pulp and Paper Mill in 2012.

In 1912, Percy Milton Chandler, a Philadelphian manufacturer, built the first pulp and paper mill in the Gaspésie at the mouth of the Grand Pabos River, originally known as Portage-du-Grand-Pabos. By 1916, this village separated from Pabos and was incorporated as the Village Municipality of Chandler. The name Grand-Pabos was also used and in the 1930s, it was even tried to officially rename the village to Grand-Pabos. In 1958, Chandler gained ville (city) status.

On June 27, 2001, the municipalities of Newport, Pabos, Pabos Mills, and Saint-François-de-Pabos, as well as the City of Chandler, were merged to form the new City of Pabos, renamed to Chandler on May 4, 2002.

== Demographics ==
In the 2021 Census of Population conducted by Statistics Canada, Chandler had a population of 7,490 living in 3,572 of its 3,794 total private dwellings, a change of −0.7% from its 2016 population of 7,546. With a land area of 418.45 km^{2} (161.56 sq mi), it had a population density of 17.9/km^{2} (46.4/sq mi) in 2021.

Canada census – Chandler community profile

	2021	2016	2011
Population	7,490 (-0.7% from 2016)	7,546 (-2% from 2011)	7,703 (-2.7% from 2006)
Land area	418.45 km^{2} (161.56 sq mi)	419.34 km^{2} (161.91 sq mi)	419.53 km^{2} (161.98 sq mi)
Population density	17.9/km^{2} (46/sq mi)	18/km^{2} (47/sq mi)	18.4/km^{2} (48/sq mi)
Median age	56.0 (M: 54.8, F: 56.8)	54 (M: 53.1, F: 55)	50.7 (M: 50.1, F: 51.5)
Private dwellings	3,794 (total) 3,572 (occupied)	3,739 (total)	3,506 (total)
Median household income	$60,000	$45,160	$41,440

References: 2021 2016 2011

Historical Census Data – Chandler, Quebec
Year	Pop.	±%
2006	7,914	—
2011	7,703	−2.7%
2016	7,546	−2.0%
2021	7,490	−0.7%
Source: Statistics Canada

Canada Census Mother Tongue – Chandler, Quebec
Census	Total	French			English			French & English			Other		
Year	Responses	Count	Trend	Pop %	Count	Trend	Pop %	Count	Trend	Pop %	Count	Trend	Pop %
2021	7,385	6,970	▼0.2%	94.4%	275	▼16.7%	3.7%	100	▲100.0%	1.4%	35	▲16.7%	0.5%
2016	7,400	6,985	▼2.9%	94.4%	330	▼1.5%	4.5%	50	0.0%	0.7%	30	▲50.0%	0.4%
2011	7,600	7,195	▼3.3%	94.7%	335	▲31.4%	4.4%	50	▲400.0%	0.7%	20	▼73.3%	0.3%
2006	7,780	7,440	n/a%	95.6%	255	n/a%	3.3%	10	n/a%	0.1%	75	n/a%	1.0%

== Attractions ==
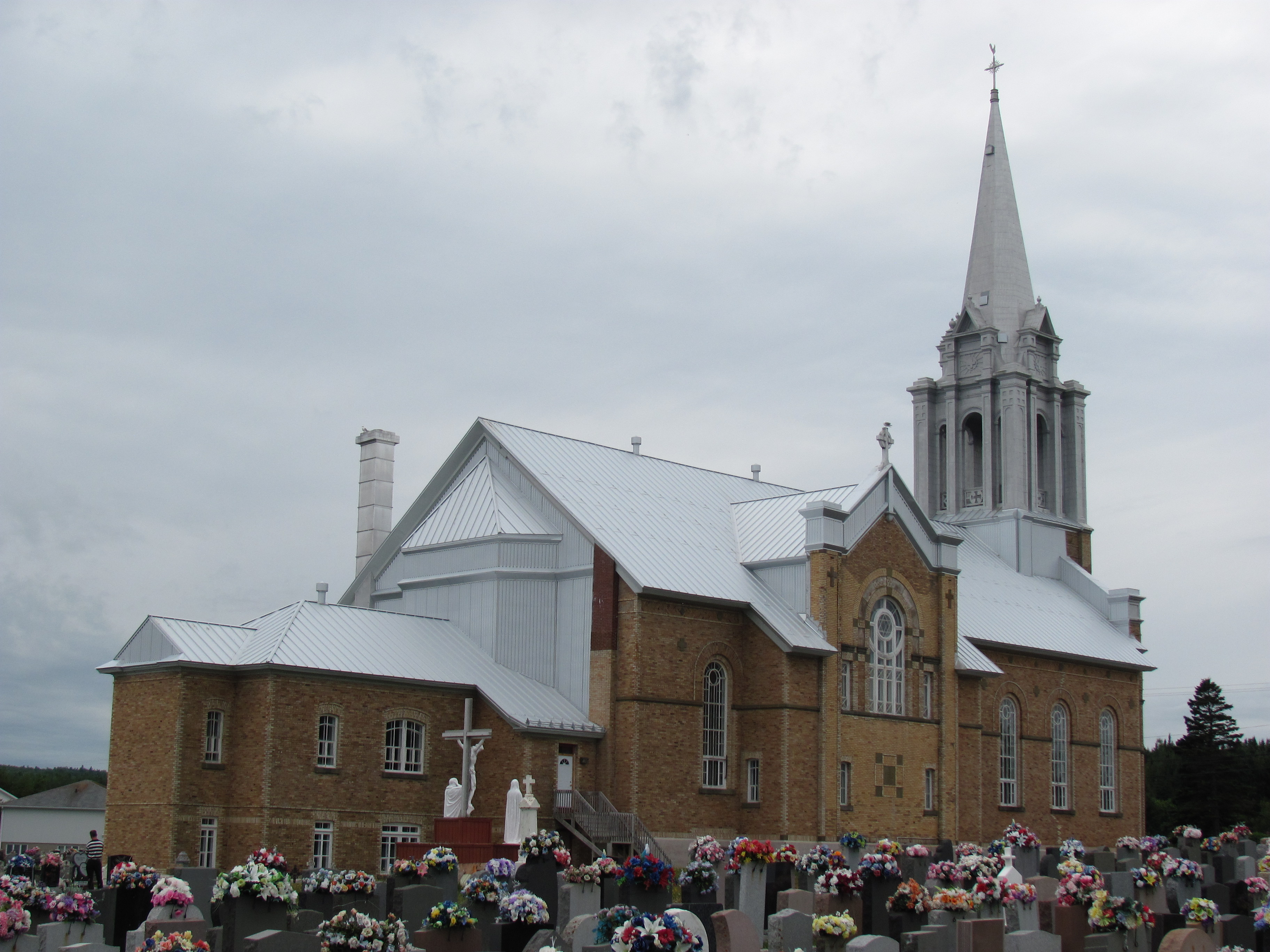
St. Dominique's Church in Newport

Saint Dominique's Church is a large Roman Catholic church in Newport.

== Government ==
List of former mayors (since formation of current municipality):

- Claude Cyr (2001–2009)
- Louisette Langlois (2009–2021)
- Gilles Daraiche (2021–present)

== Education ==
Centre de services scolaire René-Lévesque operates Francophone schools.

- École Sacré-Coeur
- École Saint-Joseph
- École Saint-Paul
- Polyvalente Mgr Sévigny

Eastern Shores School Board operates Anglophone schools.

- Saint Patrick's Elementary School
- Evergreen High School

== See also ==
- List of cities in Quebec
