= Gaspésie–Îles-de-la-Madeleine =

- Administrative region
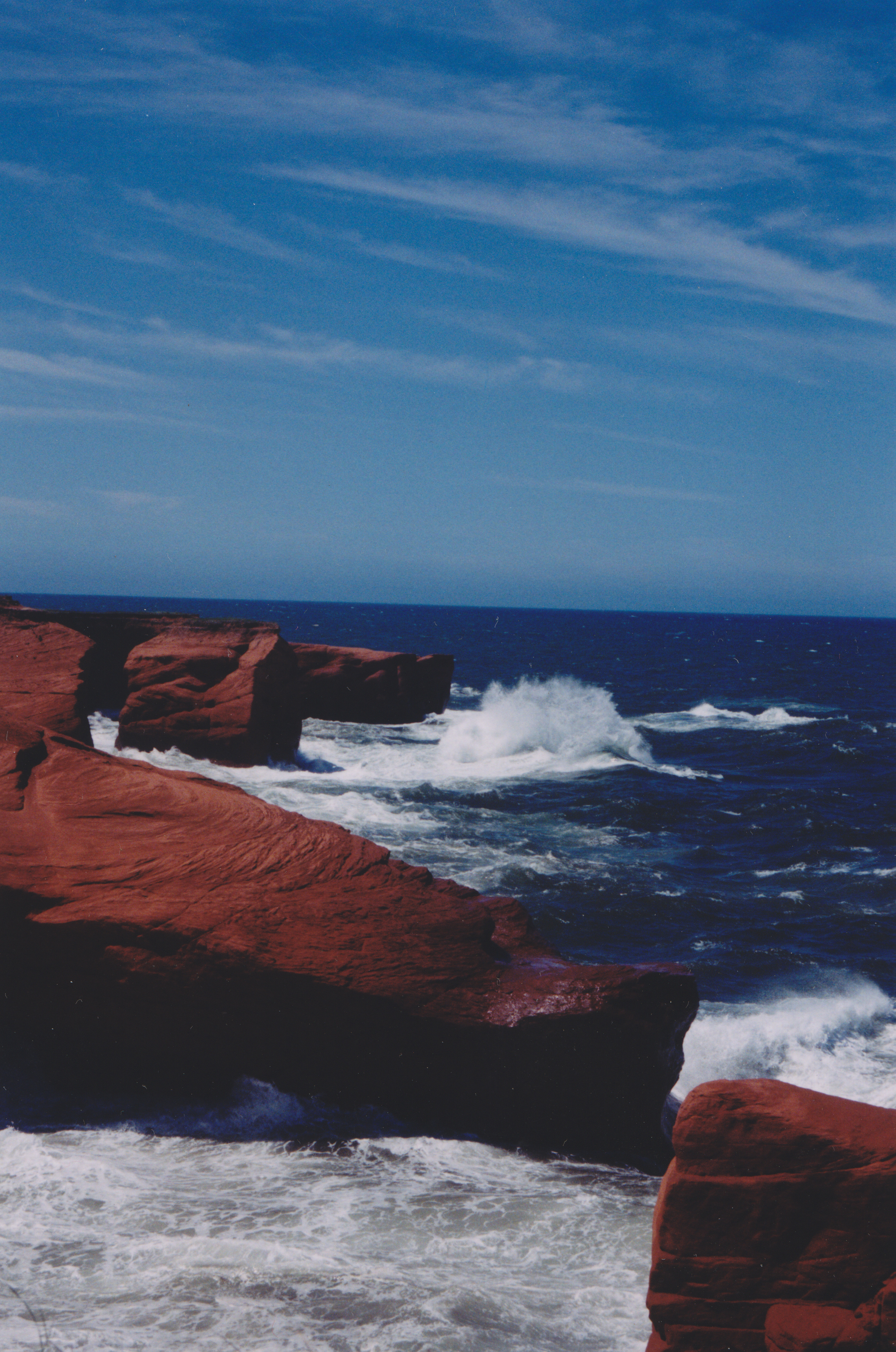
- Gulf of St Lawrence. Magdalen Island, Cap-aux-Meules, Chemin du Phare

- Coordinates: 48°41′N 65°24′W
- Country: Canada
- Province: Quebec
- Regional County Municipalities (RCM) and Equivalent Territories (ET): 5 RCM, 2 ET: Avignon; Bonaventure; Le Rocher-Percé; La Côte-de-Gaspé; La Haute-Gaspésie; Grosse-Île (ET); Les Îles-de-la-Madeleine (ET)

Government
  - Regroupement des MRC de la Gaspésie – Forum Gaspésie–Îles-de-la-Madeleine (Regional conference of elected officers): David Saint-Laurier de Parré (President)

Area
  - Land: 20,271.24 km^{2} (7,826.77 sq mi)

Population (2021)
  - Total: 89,342
  - Density: 4.4/km^{2} (11/sq mi)
- Time zone: UTC-5 (EST)
  - Summer (DST): UTC-4 (EDT)
- Postal code: G
- Area code: 418, 581
- Website: www.gaspesie-iles-de-la-madeleine.gouv.qc.ca

Gaspésie–Îles-de-la-Madeleine (French pronunciation: [ɡaspezi il də la madlɛn]) is an administrative region of Quebec consisting of the Gaspé Peninsula (Gaspésie) and the Îles-de-la-Madeleine. It lies in the Gulf of Saint Lawrence at the eastern extreme of southern Quebec. The predominant economic activities are fishing, forestry and tourism.

== Region ==
The administrative region of Gaspésie–Îles-de-la-Madeleine was created on December 22, 1987. It brings together two geographical units: the Gaspé Peninsula (20,102.69 km^{2}, 7,761.69 sq mi) and the Magdalen Islands archipelago (205.4 km^{2}, 79.3 sq mi). The population was 90,311 at the time of the 2016 census. The region's interior, 80% of which is covered by coniferous forests, is among the most rugged terrain in the province. Rich soils cover the land along the coast and within the region's river valleys. Important mineral deposits are also found in this region.

Forty-two local municipalities are located in the Gaspésie–Îles-de-la-Madeleine region, along with seven unorganized territories, two reserves, and one Mi'kmaq community. With the exception of a few villages, the entire population is spread out along the coast, in villages with fewer than 5,000 inhabitants. Its largest community is the city of Gaspé (2011 population 15,163), near the tip of the peninsula.

The region has undergone many stresses which have influenced the evolution of its economy. The decrease in population as well as in primary resources, the weak diversity of secondary economic activities, and the seasonal nature of many of its jobs are all elements that explain the fragility of the job market. Tourism plays a vital part in the region's economy.

== Administrative divisions ==
=== Regional county municipalities ===
- Avignon Regional County Municipality
- Bonaventure Regional County Municipality
- Le Rocher-Percé Regional County Municipality
- La Côte-de-Gaspé Regional County Municipality
- La Haute-Gaspésie Regional County Municipality

=== Independent municipalities ===
- Grosse-Île
- Les Îles-de-la-Madeleine

=== Indian reserves ===
- Gesgapegiag
- Gespeg
- Listuguj

== Major communities ==
- Carleton-sur-Mer
- Chandler
- Gaspé
- Grande-Rivière
- Les Îles-de-la-Madeleine
- New Richmond
- Sainte-Anne-des-Monts
