= Zec de la Rivière-Matane =

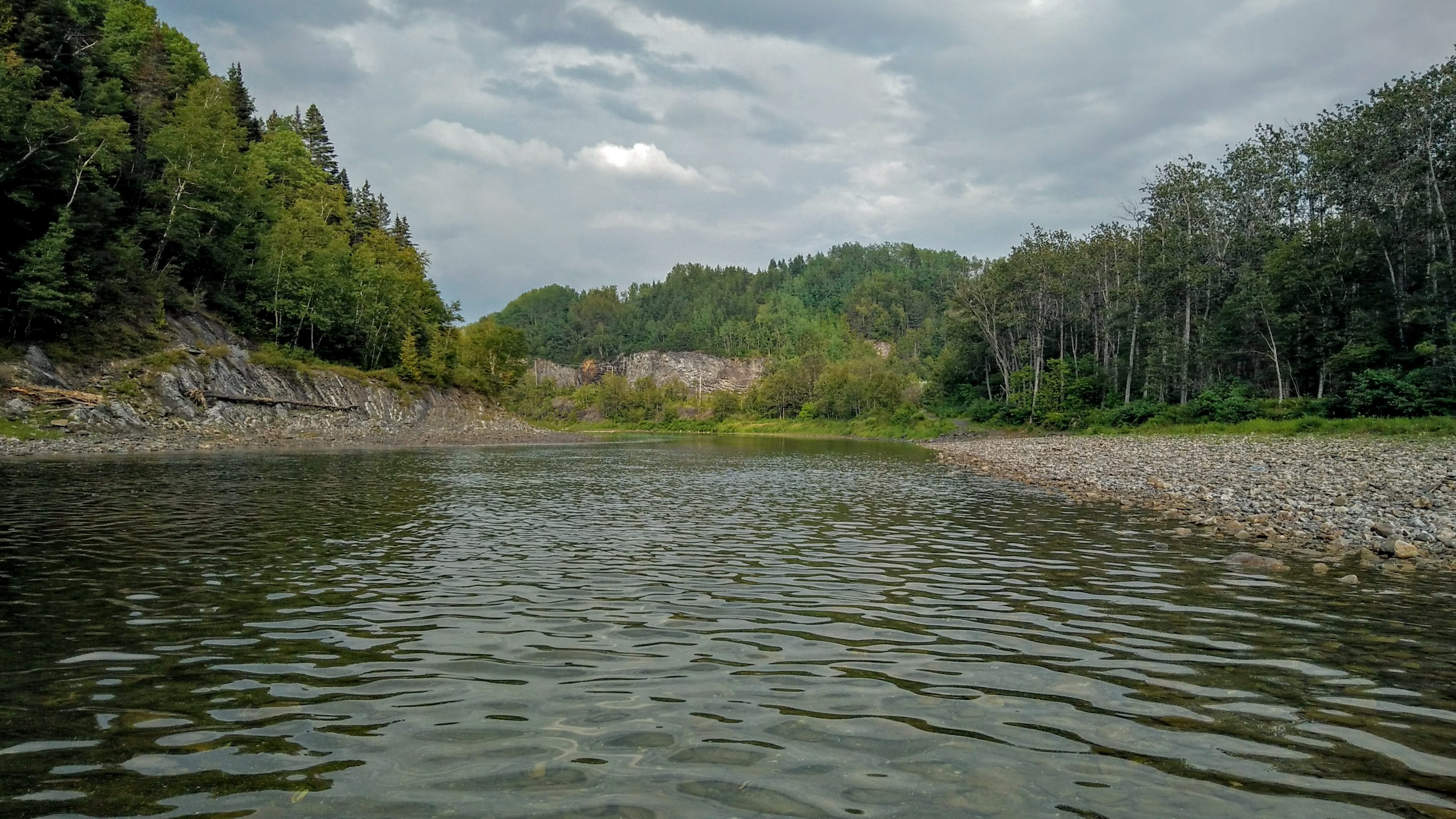
- Matane river as seen from Petite Montagne pool in Saint-Jérôme-de-Matane.

- Location within Quebec
- Location: Canada, Quebec, La Matanie Regional County Municipality
- Nearest city: Mtane
- Coordinates: 48°42′50″N 67°24′15″W
- Area: Length of 102 kilometres (63 mi)
- Established: 1992
- Governing body: Société de gestion de la Rivière-Matane

The Zec de la Rivière-Matane is a "zone d'exploitation contrôlée" (controlled harvesting zone) (ZEC) in the unorganized territory of Rivière-Bonjour (Matane Wildlife Reserve), in the municipality of Saint-René-de-Matane and in the city of Matane, in La Matanie Regional County Municipality, in the administrative region of Bas-Saint-Laurent, in Quebec, in Canada.

ZEC is administered by the "Société de gestion de la Rivière-Matane" which is a non-profit organization.

== Geography ==
Lac Matane

Located in Canton CUOQ, and having a length of 6 kilometres (3.7 mi) (in the north–south axis), the Matane lake is the main headwater lake of the Matane River. Upstream, we find smaller lakes: Leclercq, Lebreux and Lake Head. Streams "aux Perdrix" (Partridge) and Donetgay (taking it source at the foot of Mont Fernand-Fafard) feed these lakes.

Matane River

Bonjour River flowing toward south-west joins the outlet of Lake Matane, where begins Matane River. The latter runs a priori to the southwest, on 23 kilometres (14 mi) as if would be the continuation of the Bonjour River. Then down the river turns west, dropping about 45 kilometres (28 mi) up to its mouth, collecting water of:

- North side: streams of pitounes, Duvivier, Pénomect, Jean, Little River Matane and Gagnon;
- South side: streams "At the Trout", Chandler, Simoneau, Tamagodi, Johnson and Petchedetz (river).

The Matane River flows into cantons Cuoq, Matane and Tessier. The course of the river passes through (or near) the hamlets and villages of: La John, Rivière-Matane, Village-à-Dancause, Le Renversé, Saint-René-de-Matane, Ruisseau Gagnon, the "Ferme-Jeneusse", la Baie-des-Frissons, Mont Castor, Grand-Détour and Saint-Jérome-de-Matane.

The route 195 runs on 31.1 kilometres (19.3 mi) along the Matane River (north side). Upstream of the hamlet "Matane River," the path of the wildlife sanctuary can be traced back to Matane River and Bonjour River.

In the end, the river meets the dam Mathieu-D'Amours and rapids "De la Roche à Camel" located at Saint-Jérôme-de-Matane, close to the town of Matane.

== Salmon fishing ==
The Matane River has 81 water pits for salmon between the mouth of the river Duvivier (a tributary) and the city of Matane. The salmon journey upstream the river is generally regular, due mainly thanks to a major fish ladder fitted to Mathieu-d'Amour dam. The city of Matane is privileged to have two salmon water pits in its urban area, or downstream of the dam.

The salmon wildlife usually made a stop in the pit no. 2, before migrating to the upstream areas of the river, usually waiting for favorable conditions of flow and temperature. The shape and the strategic position of the pit no. 2 salmon guide to the entrance of the fishway dam. Exceptional floods in recent decades, particularly that of 2007, contributed to the deposition of sediments that filled the two pits downtown. In addition, the previous improvements on the river were deteriorated.

On Matane River, anglers can tease salmon without reservation or participation in a draw. ZEC requires only the provincial fishing license and salmon daily access fee for the Matane River. ZEC does not apply quota of fish or fishing limit. Only the salmon fly with silks and floating advance are permitted on the Matane River. The catch of all other species must be returned to the water. Fishing is only ford. Virtually all pits are easily accessible. In 2014, fishing is prohibited in the upstream part of the pit # 57 "Cape Sixteen".

At the entrance station the "Société de gestion de la rivière Matane" provides rental equipment for fly fishing, including: fly rod, boots, panties, silk, stockings line, fishing vest and glasses. In addition, the package provides ZEC River School for salmon fishing with qualified instructors appointed by the Sogerm.

== Toponymy ==
The name of the ZEC is directly derived from the name of the river of the same name.

The name "Zec de la Rivière-Matane" was made official on March 5, 1993, at the Bank of place names in the Commission de toponymie du Québec (Geographical Names Board of Quebec)

== See also ==
- Saint-René-de-Matane, municipality
- La Matanie Regional County Municipality (RCM)
- Matane Regional County Municipality
- Bas-Saint-Laurent, administrative region of Quebec
- Matane
- Matane River
- Little Matane River
- Jean-Chassé Bridge
- Rivière-Bonjour, unorganized territory
- Zone d'exploitation contrôlée (controlled harvesting zone) (zec)
