= Saint-Léon-le-Grand, Bas-Saint-Laurent =

Saint-Léon-le-Grand
- Parish municipality
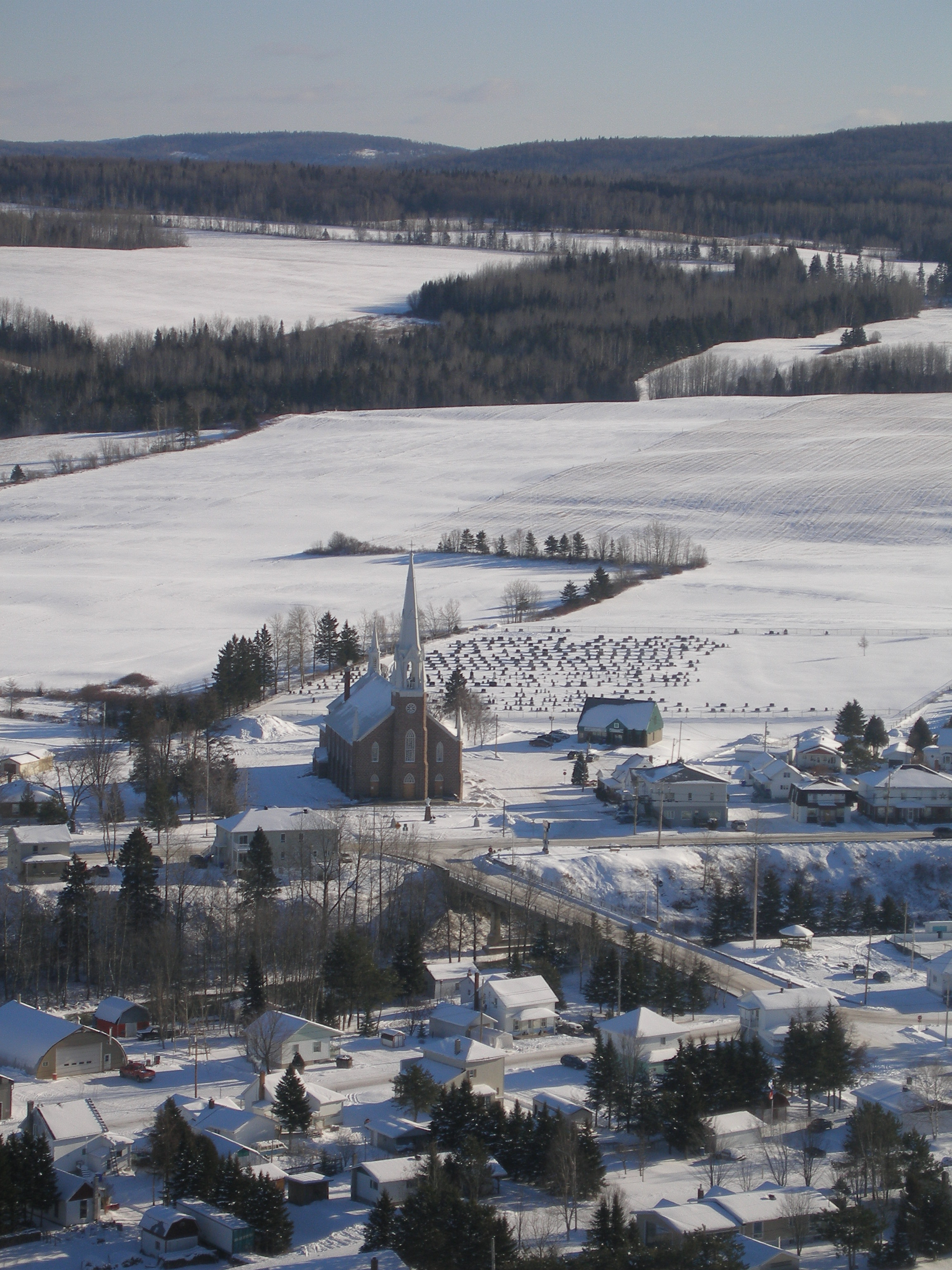

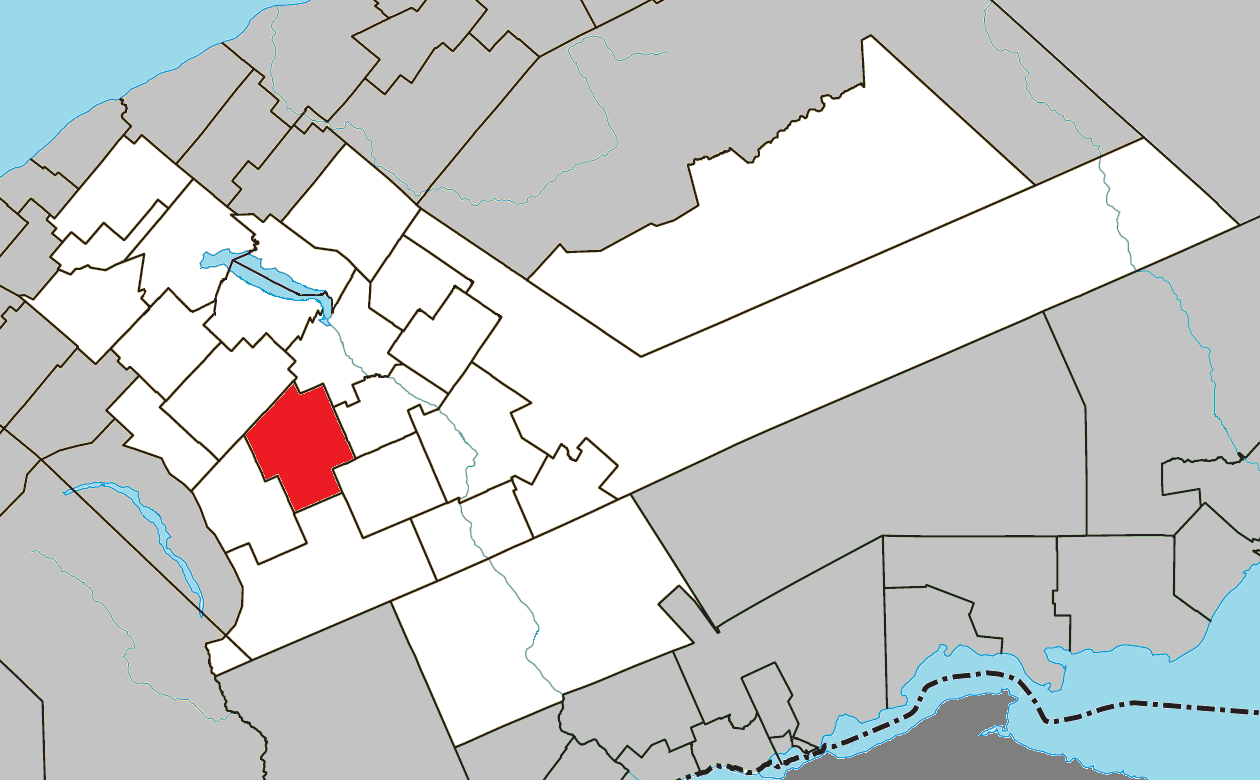
- Location within La Matapédia RCM

- Location in eastern Quebec
- Coordinates: 48°23′N 67°30′W
- Country: Canada
- Province: Quebec
- Region: Bas-Saint-Laurent
- RCM: La Matapédia
- Settled: 1896
- Constituted: August 12, 1903
- Named for: Pope Leo I

Government
  - Mayor: Aubert Turcotte
  - Fed. riding: Rimouski-Neigette—Mitis—Matapédia—Les Basques
  - Prov. riding: Matane-Matapédia-Mitis

Area
  - Total: 129.54 km^{2} (50.02 sq mi)
  - Land: 128.26 km^{2} (49.52 sq mi)

Population (2021)
  - Total: 968
  - Density: 7.5/km^{2} (19/sq mi)
  - Change 2016-21: ▲1.6%
  - Dwellings: 447
- Time zone: UTC−5 (EST)
  - Summer (DST): UTC−4 (EDT)
- Postal code(s): G0J 2W0
- Area codes: 418, 581
- Highways: R-195
- Website: municipalite.saint-leon-le-grand.qc.ca

Saint-Léon-le-Grand (French pronunciation: [sɛ̃ leɔ̃ lə ɡʁɑ̃]) is a parish municipality in Quebec, Canada.

== History ==
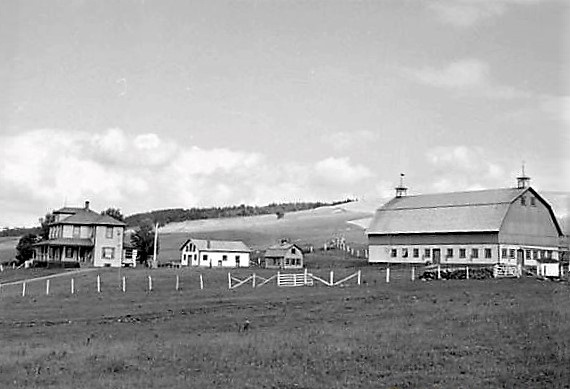
Farm in Saint-Leon-Le-Grand, 1948

The territory was first a logging concession belonging to the Price company. The first settlers arrived in 1896 from Baie-des-Sables, Cap-Chat, Sainte-Félicité, Chicoutimi and Lac Saint-Jean. In the late 1880s, Jos Néron, François Gagné, Eusèbe Gagnon, Polyte Bouchard, Louis Girard, Henri Desbiens, Achille Potvin, Polyte Bouchard (the great) and Hector Desbiens were the first pioneers of the region. The Catholic mission was founded in 1901. Contrary to custom, the civil erection took place before the canonical erection of the parish. The municipality was officially founded civilly on August 12, 1903, while the parish was canonically established four years later, on December 9, 1907. However, the parish registers had been open since 1905. For its part, the post office was created in 1903. In 1941, a major fire broke out in a business and destroyed a dozen homes.

== Geography ==
Saint-Léon-le-Grand is located on the southern slope of the St. Lawrence River, 430 km northeast of Quebec City and 110 km southeast of Rimouski. Important towns near Saint-Léon-le-Grand are Amqui at 12 km and Lac-au-Saumon at 16 km to the east. Causapscal at 27 km to the east as well as Sayabec at 33 km to the north. Saint-Léon-le-Grand is located on Route 195 halfway between Amqui and Saint-Zénon-du-Lac-Humqui. The territory of Saint-Léon-le-Grand covers an area of 127 km2. Most of this territory is mountainous and covered with forests.

The municipality of Saint-Léon-le-Grand is located in the regional county municipality (RCM) of La Matapédia in the administrative region of Bas-Saint-Laurent. The eponymous parish of Saint-Léon-le-Grand is located in the Roman Catholic Archdiocese of Rimouski and, more specifically, in the pastoral region of La Matapédia. Saint-Léon-le-Grand is part of the Gaspésie tourist region in the Matapédia Valley tourist sub-region.

== Demographics ==
=== Population ===
In the 2021 Census of Population conducted by Statistics Canada, Saint-Léon-le-Grand had a population of 968 living in 420 of its 447 total private dwellings, a change of 1.6% from its 2016 population of 953. With a land area of 128.26 km^{2} (49.52 sq mi), it had a population density of 7.5/km^{2} (19.5/sq mi) in 2021.

Canada census – Saint-Léon-le-Grand community profile

	2021	2016	2011
Population	968 (+1.6% from 2016)	953 (-1.8% from 2011)	970 (-9.6% from 2006)
Land area	128.26 km^{2} (49.52 sq mi)	128.47 km^{2} (49.60 sq mi)	128.50 km^{2} (49.61 sq mi)
Population density	7.5/km^{2} (19/sq mi)	7.4/km^{2} (19/sq mi)	7.5/km^{2} (19/sq mi)
Median age	51.6 (M: 54.4, F: 48.8)	51.3 (M: 51.8, F: 50.6)	47.7 (M: 49.4, F: 46.3)
Private dwellings	447 (total) 420 (occupied)	440 (total)	434 (total)
Median household income	$62,000	$48,256	$43,349

Notes: 2011 income data for this area has been suppressed for data quality or confidentiality reasons.
References: 2021 2016 2011

Historical Census Data - Saint-Léon-le-Grand, Quebec

Year	Pop.	±%
1911	2,310	—
1921	1,902	−17.7%
1931	1,494	−21.5%
1941	1,177	−21.2%
1951	2,068	+75.7%
1956	2,119	+2.5%
1961	2,139	+0.9%

Year	Pop.	±%
1966	1,933	−9.6%
1971	1,570	−18.8%
1976	1,325	−15.6%
1981	1,335	+0.8%
1986	1,277	−4.3%
1991	1,150	−9.9%
1996	1,145	−0.4%

Year	Pop.	±%
2001	1,144	−0.1%
2006	1,073	−6.2%
2011	970	−9.6%
2016	953	−1.8%
2021	968	+1.6%

Source: Statistics Canada

=== Language ===
Canada Census Mother Tongue - Saint-Léon-le-Grand, Quebec
Census	Total	French			English			French & English			Other		
Year	Responses	Count	Trend	Pop %	Count	Trend	Pop %	Count	Trend	Pop %	Count	Trend	Pop %
2021	950	940	▲0.5%	98.9%	10	▲100.0%	1.1%	0	0.0%	0.0%	0	0.0%	0.0%
2016	940	935	▼2.6%	99.5%	5	0.0%	0.5%	0	0.0%	0.0%	0	0.0%	0.0%
2011	960	960	▼7.7%	100.0%	5	▲ n/a%	0.5%	0	0.0%	0.0%	0	▼100.0%	0.0%
2006	1,050	1,040	▼7.6%	99.0%	0	0.0%	0.0%	0	0.0%	0.0%	10	▲ n/a%	1.0%
2001	1,130	1,125	▼1.7%	99.6%	0	▼100.0%	0.0%	0	0.0%	0.0%	0	0.0%	0.0%
1996	1,145	1,145	n/a	100.0%	10	n/a	0.9%	0	n/a	0.0%	0	n/a	0.0%

== Attractions ==
There are several footpaths in the mountains at Saint-Léon-le-Grand.

== Government ==
List of former mayors:

- Louis Girard (1903–1906)
- Louis Lefrançois (1906–1907, 1908–1909)
- Joseph Boudreault (1907–1908)
- Arsène Lauzier (1909–1914)
- Philippe Lévesque (1914–1916)
- Michel Morin (1916–1918)
- Arthur Laforest (1918–1921)
- Joseph Bélanger (1921–1923)
- Adélard Boudreault (1923–1927)
- Lazare Ouellet (1927–1933, 1935–1942)
- William Potvin (1933–1935)
- Alfred Belzile (1942–1944)
- André Imbeault (1944–1947)
- Charles Ouellet (1947–1948)
- Moïse Lavoie (1948–1961)
- Paul Guénette (1961–1967)
- Louis Anctil (1967–1969)
- Georges Lévesque (1969–1971, 1975–1978)
- Fabien Lapointe (1971–1975)
- Euloge Laplante (1978–1983)
- Lucienne Lévesque (1983–1989)
- Laurent Boudreau (1989–1995)
- Jean Guy Rioux (1995–2002)
- Mario Lévesque (2002–2003)
- Michel Mc Nicoll (2003–2009)
- Steve Lamontagne (2009–2013)
- Daniel Dumais (2013–2017)
- Jean-Côme Lévesque (2017–2025)
- Aubert Turcotte (2025–present)

== See also ==
- List of parish municipalities in Quebec
