= Zec de Cap-Chat =

- Location within Quebec
- Nearest city: 66° 49' 00" 48° 53' 00"
- Coordinates: 48°53′00″N 66°49′00″W
- Established: 1992
- Governing body: Société de gestion de la rivière Cap-Chat

The Zec de Cap-Chat (formerly designated "Réserve faunique de Cap-Chat" (Wildlife Sanctuary of Cap-Chat)) is a zone d'exploitation contrôlée (Controlled harvesting zone) (ZEC) located in the municipality of Les Méchins and the unorganized territory of Rivière-Bonjour, in La Matanie Regional County Municipality, in the administrative region of Bas-Saint-Laurent, Quebec, Canada.

The ZEC is administered by "Société de gestion de la rivière Cap-Chat".

== Geography ==
Zec de Cap-Chat is located on the Gaspé Peninsula.

The main entry of Zec is easily accessible. Visitors can use the Route 132 along the southern coast of St. Lawrence River, to the municipality of Cap-Chat. The visitors then head south along "rue des Fonds", rue des Érables (the Maples Street) and "chemin du Cassette". These roads of the panoramic corridor goes along the Cap-Chat River, passing near Mount Logan (elevation of 1,135 metres (3,724 ft)) in the Gaspésie National Park.

Visitors can access the "camping du Ruisseau l'Islet" (Creek Islet campsite) by car, or Platforms Prospector (accessible by hiking).

From the edge of the ZEC de Cap-Chat, the Cap-Chat River flows north-east, then north on 57.5 km to its mouth in the St. Lawrence River, in the municipality of Cap-Chat. And 56.6 kilometres (35.2 mi) of this river is incorporated as a zone d'exploitation contrôlée (Controlled Harvesting Zone) which turn to be the ZEC de la Rivière-Cap-Chat.

== Wildlife ==
Hunting is regulated on the ZEC. Hunters will need to consider quotas and follow the procedures (hunting season by species and gear hunting). The main species hunted on the ZEC are: coyote, moose, deer, black bear, grouse and Hare.

== Toponymy ==
The term "Cap-Chat" refers to a set of designated places in the region of Cap-Chat lordship, two ZECs, township, city, bay, roads and streets, rivers, tip, canyon and butte.

According to the Commission de toponymie du Québec (Geographical Names Board of Québec), the term "Cap-Chat" appears in 29 names on the territory of the Quebec, including the city, the river, the small-river, ZEC, the lordship township, bay and roads.

== See also ==
- Gaspé
- Zec de la Rivière-Cap-Chat
