= Matane River =

River in Quebec, Canada

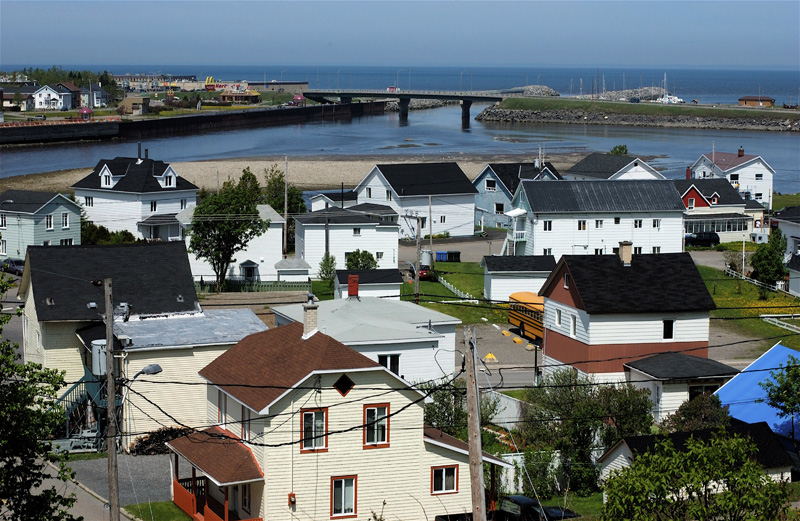
- Mouth of the Matane River

Location
- Country: Canada
- Province: Quebec
- Region: Bas-Saint-Laurent
- MRC: La Matanie Regional County Municipality

Physical characteristics
- Source: streams on the western slope of Mont Blanc
  - location: Rivière-Bonjour (canton Le Clercq)
  - coordinates: 48°47′08″N 66°52′57″W
  - elevation: 350 m (1,150 ft)
- Mouth: Saint Lawrence River
  - location: Matane
  - coordinates: 48°51′11″N 67°32′01″W
  - elevation: 1 m (3.3 ft)
- Length: 105.3 km (65.4 mi)

Basin features
- Tributaries
  - left: (upstream) Petchedetz River, Bastien Creek, Johnson Creek, Towagodi River, Tamagodi River, Simonneau Creek, Chandler Creek, Martel Creek, rivière à la Truite, Desjarlais Creek, Ouelette Creek, Camp Creek, Donetgay Creek
  - right: (upstream) Lac Blanchette and Lac Bernier outlet, Gagnon stream, Petite rivière Matane, Saint-Jean stream, Pitounes stream, Duvivier River

The Matane River (French pronunciation: [matan]) is a river flowing in La Matanie Regional County Municipality, in administrative region of Bas-Saint-Laurent, on the Gaspé Peninsula, in the province of Quebec, Canada, which empties into the Saint Lawrence River at the city of Matane.

The river successively crosses the cantons: Le Clercq and Cuoq (in unorganized territory of Rivière-Bonjour), Tessier (in Saint-René-de-Matane), Matapédia (in Saint-Alexis-de-Matapédia), and Matane (in Saint-Léandre and the city of Matane).

== Geography ==
The Matane River originates from mountain streams on the western slope of the mont Blanc, located in the Leclercq township, in the Matane Wildlife Reserve. This source is located 0.5 km (0.31 mi) on the north side of the summit of Mont Blanc, 24.1 km (15.0 mi) to the southeast of the southeast coast of the Estuary of Saint Lawrence, 2.3 km (1.4 mi) northeast of the summit of Mont Craggy and 40.0 km (24.9 mi) from the mouth from the Matane River.

From its source, the Matane River flows over 105.3 km (65.4 mi) divided into the following segments:

Upper course of the Matane river (segment of 30.0 km (18.6 mi)):

- 7.4 km (4.6 mi) towards the west in the Matane Wildlife Reserve, showing a steep drop of 637 m (2,090 ft) (passing from 955 m (3,133 ft) at 318 m (1,043 ft)), to the confluence of the Dontigny stream (coming from the south);
- 0.2 km (0.12 mi) north-west, up to the confluence of Camp stream (coming from the south-west);
- 1.4 km (0.87 mi) north-west, until the confluence of a stream coming from the north-east;
- 1.9 km (1.2 mi) north-west, up to the confluence of a stream coming from the north-east;
- 4.6 km (2.9 mi) south-west, to a bridge over a forest road;
- 3.4 km (2.1 mi) southwards, to the north shore of Lac de la Tête (altitude: 241 m (791 ft)), in the shape of a heart;
- 0.6 km (0.37 mi) to the south, crossing Lac de la Tête, to its mouth;
- 3.7 km (2.3 mi) towards the south-east, collecting the water from the outlet of Lake Lebreux (coming from the west), to the mouth of Lake Leclercq which the current crosses towards the south -is on 1.3 km (0.81 mi);
- 2.5 km (1.6 mi) southeasterly, to the north shore of Lac Matane;
- 4.3 km (2.7 mi) towards the south-east, crossing Lac Matane (length: altitude: 220 m (720 ft)) over its full length, to the dam located at its mouth ( south-eastern part of the lake). A road bridge is built on the top of the dam.

Intermediate course of the Matane river (segment of 33.9 km (21.1 mi))

From the Lac Matane dam, the Matane river flows over:

- 1.3 km (0.81 mi) south-west in township Cuoq, to a bridge over a forest road;
- 1.2 km (0.75 mi) south-west, to a bridge over a forest road;
- 11.4 km (7.1 mi) towards the southwest, crossing several falls and rapids, as well as passing under a road bridge at the end of the segment, until the confluence of the rivière à la Truite (coming from the east);
- 1.2 km (0.75 mi) westwards, up to the confluence of the Pitounes stream (coming from the north-west);
- 9.5 km (5.9 mi) westward, to the confluence of Simonneau stream (coming from the southwest);
- 0.5 km (0.31 mi) north-west, to a bridge over a forest road;
- 3.7 km (2.3 mi) north-west, up to the confluence of a stream (coming from the north);
- 2.7 km (1.7 mi) westwards, to the confluence of the Saint-Jean stream (coming from the north);
- 1.1 km (0.68 mi) westwards, to the limit of canton Tessier;
- 1.3 km (0.81 mi) towards the southwest, until the confluence of the Tamagodi River (coming from the south).

Lower course of the Matane river (segment of 41.4 km (25.7 mi))

From the confluence of the Tamagodi River, the Matane river flows over:

- 3.4 km (2.1 mi) north-west, up to the Rivière-Matane hamlet bridge, ie route 195;
- 9.8 km (6.1 mi) north-west, up to the covered bridge of the village of Saint-René-de-Matane;
- 1.8 km (1.1 mi) north-west, up to the confluence of the Petite rivière Matane (coming from the north-east);
- 1.0 km (0.62 mi) north-west, up to the mountain road bridge;
- 5.3 km (3.3 mi) towards the north-west, forming a large curve towards the south, up to the limit of canton of Matane;
- 2.1 km (1.3 mi) north-west, up to the Chemin de la Coulée-Carrier bridge; this point also constitutes the confluence of the Bastien stream (coming from the south);
- 4.2 km (2.6 mi) north-west, up to the confluence of the Petchedetz River (coming from the west);
- 2.5 km (1.6 mi) north-west, up to the limit of canton Tessier;
- 0.7 km (0.43 mi) northwards in canton Tessier, up to the city limit of Matane;
- 2.5 km (1.6 mi) northwards, to the covered bridge of Grand-Détour;
- 1.4 km (0.87 mi) north-west, up to the road bridge connecting the route 195 (east side of the river) and the route du Grand-Détour (west side of the river);
- 1.2 km (0.75 mi) northwards, to the Grand-Détour dam;
- 3.8 km (2.4 mi) towards the north, passing under the avenue Desjardins bridge and bypassing the Crust Islands, to the dam;
- 1.7 km (1.1 mi) to the north, passing under the rue du Bon-Pasteur bridge, crossing Matane harbor, then passing under the route 132 bridge, to its confluence.

The Matane River flows onto the northeast coast of the estuary of Saint Lawrence at the height of the town of Matane after a length of 80 km (50 mi). Among its tributaries are the rivers à la Truite, Bonjour River, Duvivier River, Petite rivière Matane and the Petchedetz River.

== Toponymy ==
The origin of the name "Matane", used for the first time by Samuel de Champlain in 1603 in the form "Mantanne" to name the river, is the subject of a dispute between the historians. Four different origins are advanced:

- the most popular is that it comes from Micmac language mtctan meaning "beaver pool", the region being rich;
- the term malécite for "spine", the trajectory of the river through the Gaspé hills allowing the approximation of meaning;
- the term Algonquin matandipives meaning "wreck" or "debris from ship" and would refer to the currents located in front of its mouth into the St. Lawrence River which would have made navigation difficult;
- the term "mattawa" or "matawin" meaning "meeting of the waters".

== Salmon spawning ground ==
The river is very well known as an important Atlantic salmon sport fishery. This fishery is highly regulated and restricted to fly fishing only. A daily permit is required to be purchased in addition to the Quebec provincial fishing license. All rules are strictly enforced to ensure the conservation and protection of this special salmon resource. Salmon permits can be obtained through the ZEC office in Matane. The river runs through a very scenic valley with a covered bridge, small farms and quaint villages on a section of Route 132.

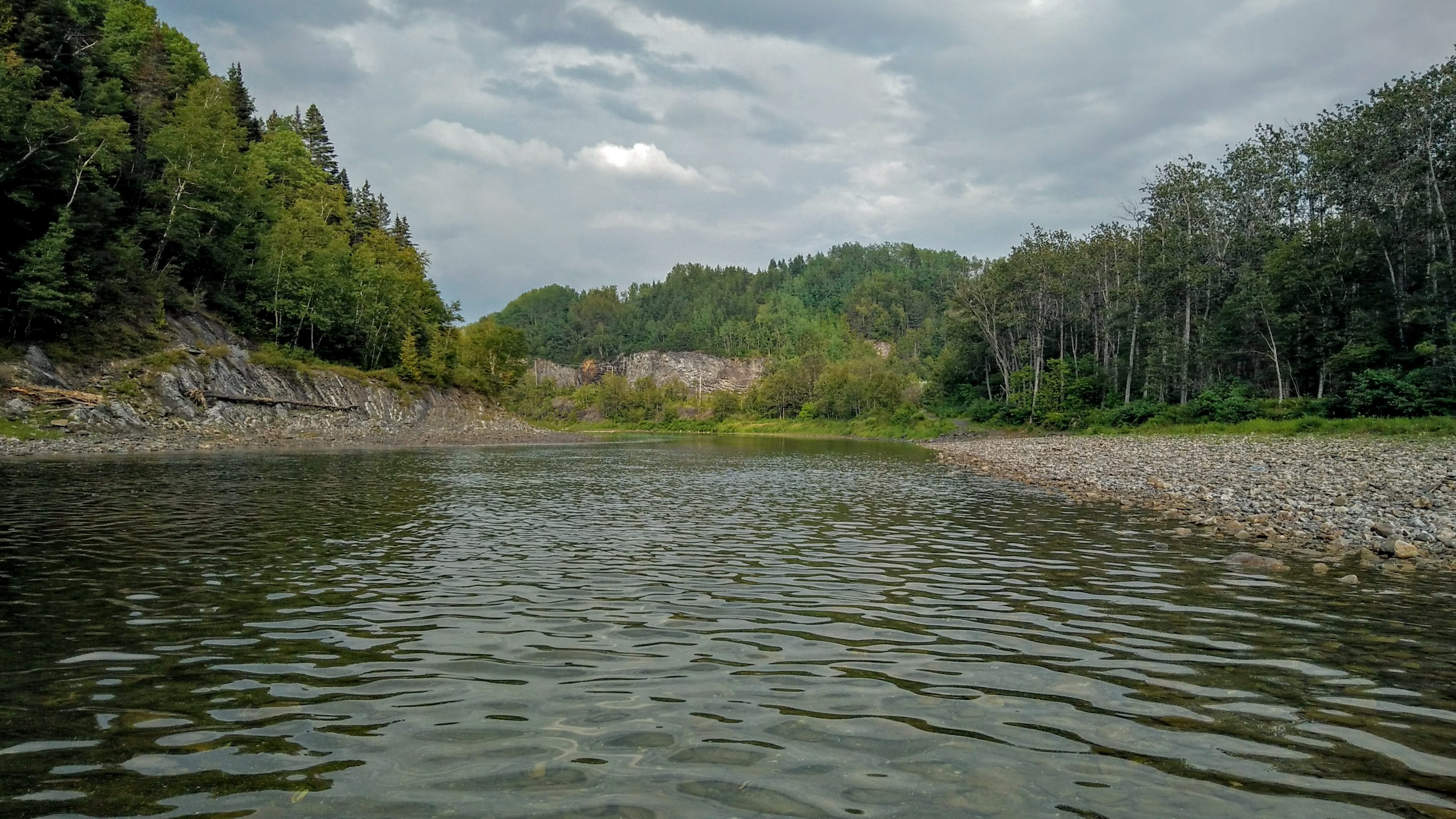
Petite Montagne pool in Matane.

There are over 70 named salmon pools on the river, and it is very popular destination during the summer months. One of the most famous salmon wet flies invented here, and still used locally as well as throughout the Gaspe region, is the Tiger Ghost. The Matane Special, also originally tied by the legendary George Maul of the village of St. Rene du Matane, halfway up the river, is a popular dry fly fished here as well.

Much of the upper river and the headwaters are included in a well-protected provincial reserve. The Matane River provides an important spawning habitat for Atlantic salmon. There is a fish ladder at the Mathieu-D'Amours dam in city of Matane with an observation centre where migrating salmon can be viewed.

== See also ==
- Zec de la Rivière-Matane, a ZEC
- List of rivers of Quebec
