= Capucins =

Capucins may refer to:

- Order of Friars Minor Capuchin
- Capucins, Quebec, a former municipality that is now part of Cap-Chat, Quebec
