= Saint-Léon-le-Grand, Quebec =

Saint-Léon-le-Grand, Quebec may refer to:

- Saint-Léon-le-Grand, Mauricie, Quebec, in Maskinongé Regional County Municipality
- Saint-Léon-le-Grand, Bas-Saint-Laurent, Quebec, in La Matapédia Regional County Municipality
