= Zec de la Rivière-Cap-Chat =

Controlled harvesting zone (zec) in Quebec, in Canada

- Location within Quebec
- Location: Canada, Quebec, La Haute-Gaspésie Regional County Municipality
- Nearest city: Cap-Chat
- Coordinates: 49°03′20″N 66°40′15″W
- Area: Length of 56.6 kilometres (35.2 mi)
- Established: 1992
- Governing body: Société de gestion de la rivière Cap-Chat

The zec de la Rivière-Cap-Chat (formerly designated "Réserve faunique de la Rivière-Cap-Chat") (Wildlife Sanctuary of Cap-Chat River) is a "zone d'exploitation controlée" (controlled harvesting zone) (zec), located in the municipality of Cap-Chat, in La Haute-Gaspésie Regional County Municipality, in the administrative region of Gaspésie-Îles-de-la-Madeleine, Quebec, Canada.

The "Société de gestion de la rivière Cap-Chat" is a nonprofit organism administering the Cap-Chat River, which is a salmon river.

== Geography ==
From the edge of the Zec de Cap-Chat, the Cap-Chat River flows north-east, then north on 57.5 km to its mouth in the St. Lawrence River, in the municipality of Cap-Chat. A segment of 56.6 kilometres (35.2 mi) of this river is formed in zone d'exploitation contrôlée (controlled harvesting zone) under the jurisdiction of the "zec de la Rivière-Cap-Chat".

This river takes its source in the heart of Chic-Choc Mountains, located in the center of the Gaspésie Peninsula. The waters of the river are very clear, as the waters descend on a gravel bottom. In this river, the size of the salmon caught is generally above average. Several individuals and organizations have been active in the preservation of salmon of the Atlantic on the river. From Cap-Chat, a forested road was built along the river to facilitate access to visitors. In complementarity, zec de Cap-Chat is located in the upper part of the Cap-Chat River, on the north shore of Gaspésie.

== Wildlife ==
In the Cap-Chat River, only five species of fish abound: the salmon, the brook trout, the slimy sculpin, the eel America and threespine épines.

The Cap-Chat River has 52 salmon pits in three fishing sectors of which just one is subject to fishing quotas. Only wading is allowed for fishing on the river; the use of a boat river is authorized only for crossing the river. The "Société de gestion de la rivière Cap-Chat" administers "zec de la Rivière-Cap-Chat" whose territory corresponds to the course of the river.

== Toponymy ==
The term "Cap-Chat" refers to a set of designated places in the region of Cap-Chat: lordship, two ZECs, township, city, bay, roads and streets, rivers, advanced land, canyon and butte.

The name "zec de la Rivière-Cap-Chat" was formalized on March 5, 1993 at the Bank of place names in the Commission de toponymie du Québec (Geographical Names Board of Quebec).

== See also ==
- St. Lawrence River
- Gaspésie
- Gaspésie National Park
- La Haute-Gaspésie Regional County Municipality, (MRC)
- Zec de Cap-Chat (controlled harvesting zone) (zec)
- Zone d'exploitation contrôlée (controlled harvesting zone) (zec)
