= Saint-Zénon-du-Lac-Humqui =

- Parish municipality
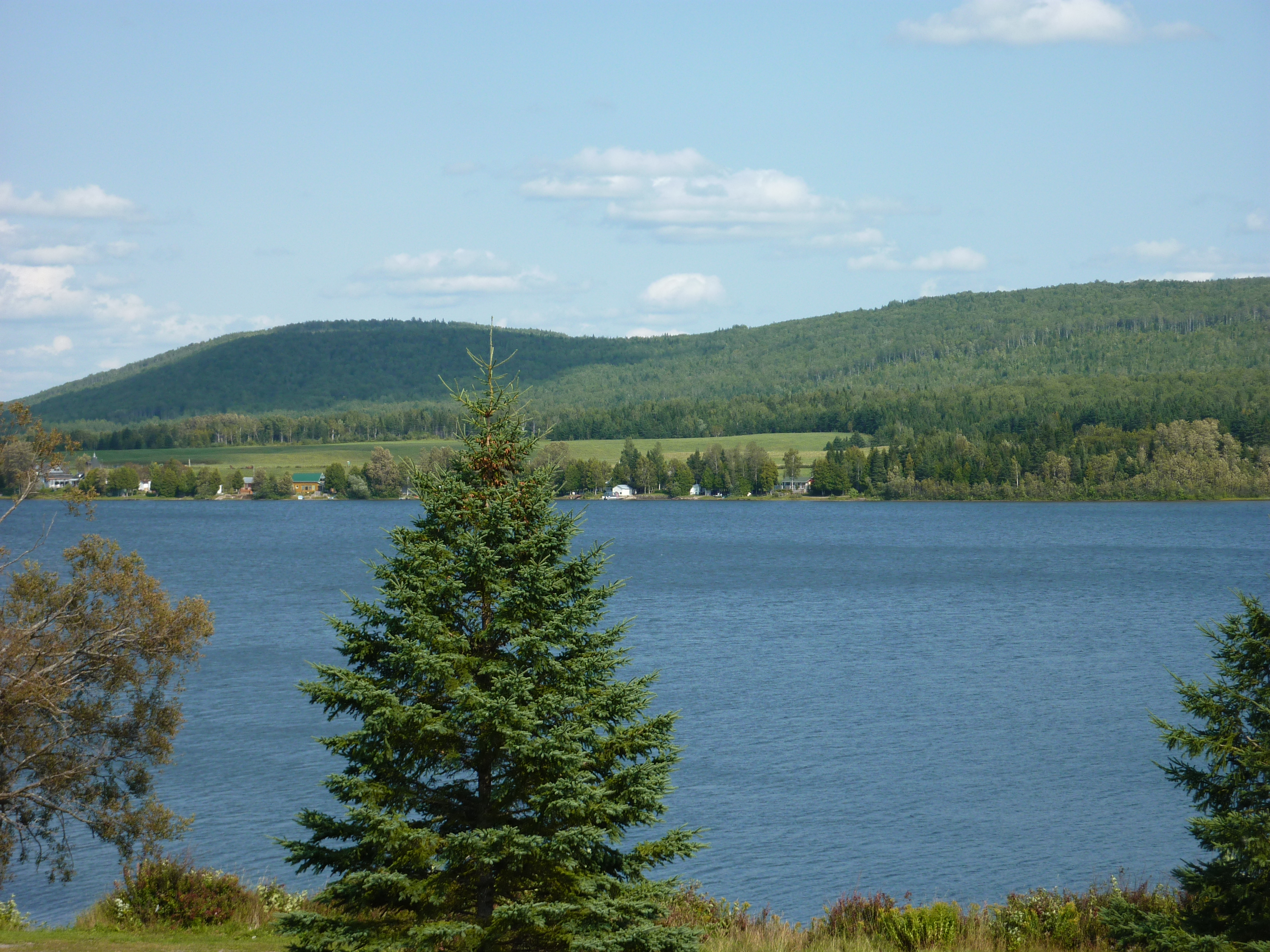
- Lake Humqui
- Motto: Fier et accueillant
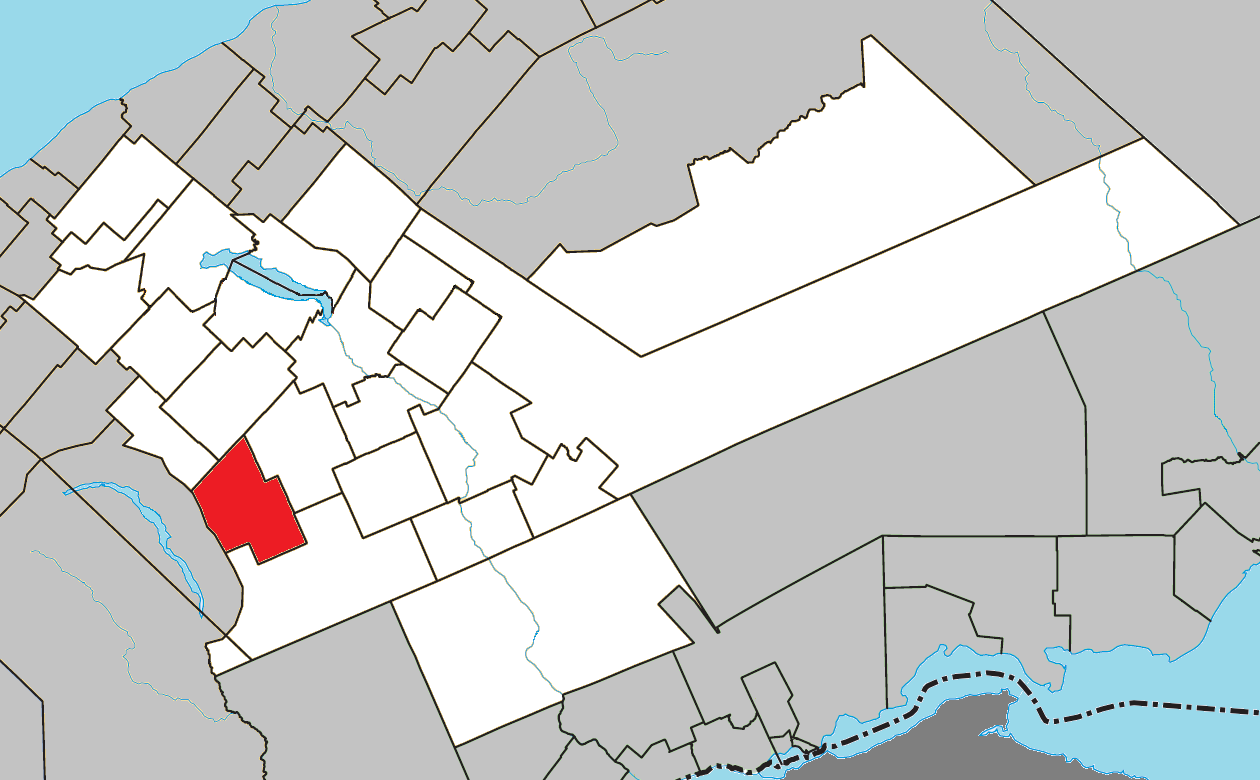
- Location within La Matapédia RCM

- Location in eastern Quebec
- Coordinates: 48°18′N 67°35′W
- Country: Canada
- Province: Quebec
- Region: Bas-Saint-Laurent
- RCM: La Matapédia
- Settled: 1902
- Constituted: April 28, 1920

Government
  - Mayor: Gino Canuel
  - Fed. riding: Rimouski-Neigette—Mitis—Matapédia—Les Basques
  - Prov. riding: Matane-Matapédia-Mitis

Area
  - Total: 114.96 km^{2} (44.39 sq mi)
  - Land: 113.09 km^{2} (43.66 sq mi)

Population (2021)
  - Total: 370
  - Density: 3.3/km^{2} (8.5/sq mi)
  - Change 2016-21: ▲3.1%
  - Dwellings: 283
- Time zone: UTC−5 (EST)
  - Summer (DST): UTC−4 (EDT)
- Postal code(s): G0J 1N0
- Area codes: 418, 581
- Highways: R-195
- Website: www.lachumqui.com

Saint-Zénon-du-Lac-Humqui (French pronunciation: [sɛ̃ zenɔ̃ dy lak amkwi], lit. 'Saint Zénon of the Humqui Lake') is a parish municipality in Quebec, Canada.

== History ==
The area was originally inhabited by Miꞌkmaq people. In 1868, Isaïe Ritchot, a native of L'Épiphanie, purchased several lots that now make up a large part of the present-day territory of Saint-Zénon-du-Lac-Humqui.

In 1892, the area was logged, while the first settlers, coming from Amqui, Sainte-Félicité, La Malbaie, Matane, and Lac-au-Saumon, arrived in 1902. In 1911, its mission was founded and named Saint-Zénon-du-Lac-Humqui. The name honours parish priest Zénon-Octave Gendron, whereas the second part refers to Lake Humqui on which the community is located (Humqui comes from the Miꞌkmaq language and means "Where the waters play").

In 1920, the parish municipality was established, taking its name from the parish.

== Demographics ==
In the 2021 Census of Population conducted by Statistics Canada, Saint-Zénon-du-Lac-Humqui had a population of 370 living in 194 of its 283 total private dwellings, a change of 3.1% from its 2016 population of 359. With a land area of 113.09 km^{2} (43.66 sq mi), it had a population density of 3.3/km^{2} (8.5/sq mi) in 2021.

Canada census – Saint-Zénon-du-Lac-Humqui community profile

	2021	2016	2011
Population	370 (+3.1% from 2016)	359 (-1.9% from 2011)	366 (-14.1% from 2006)
Land area	113.09 km^{2} (43.66 sq mi)	113.42 km^{2} (43.79 sq mi)	112.74 km^{2} (43.53 sq mi)
Population density	3.3/km^{2} (8.5/sq mi)	3.2/km^{2} (8.3/sq mi)	3.8/km^{2} (9.8/sq mi)
Median age	55.6 (M: 55.6, F: 54.8)	52.1 (M: 52.5, F: 52.0)	48.0 (M: 49.2, F: 46.8)
Private dwellings	283 (total) 194 (occupied)	284 (total)	273 (total)
Median household income	$48,000	$43,520	$.N/A

Notes: 2011 income data for this area has been suppressed for data quality or confidentiality reasons.
References: 2021 2016 2011

Historical census populations – Saint-Zénon-du-Lac-Humqui

Year	Pop.	±%
1921	75	—
1931	516	+588.0%
1941	957	+85.5%
1951	1,237	+29.3%
1956	1,199	−3.1%
1961	1,133	−5.5%

Year	Pop.	±%
1966	923	−18.5%
1971	767	−16.9%
1976	582	−24.1%
1981	550	−5.5%
1986	556	+1.1%
1991	496	−10.8%

Year	Pop.	±%
1996	464	−6.5%
2001	434	−6.5%
2006	426	−1.8%
2011	366	−14.1%
2016	359	−1.9%
2021	370	+3.1%

Source: Statistics Canada

Canada Census Mother Tongue - Saint-Zénon-du-Lac-Humqui, Quebec
Census	Total	French			English			French & English			Other		
Year	Responses	Count	Trend	Pop %	Count	Trend	Pop %	Count	Trend	Pop %	Count	Trend	Pop %
2021	370	360	▲2.7%	97.3%	5	0.0%	1.4%	0	0.0%	0.0%	0	0.0%	0.0%
2016	360	355	▼2.7%	98.6%	5	▲ n/a%	1.4%	0	0.0%	0.0%	0	0.0%	0.0%
2011	365	365	▼14.1%	100.0%	0	0.0%	0.0%	0	0.0%	0.0%	0	0.0%	0.0%
2006	425	425	0.0%	100.0%	0	▼100.0%	0.0%	0	0.0%	0.0%	0	0.0%	0.0%
2001	435	425	▼7.6%	97.7%	10	0.0%	2.3%	0	0.0%	0.0%	0	0.0%	0.0%
1996	470	460	n/a	97.9%	10	n/a	2.1%	0	n/a	0.0%	0	n/a	0.0%

== Government ==
Municipal council:

- Mayor: Gino Canuel
- Councillors: Caroline Dumont, Diane Soucy, Karine Dechamplain, Nancy Malenfant, Normand Henley, Marc Michaud

List of former mayors:

- Clovis Gagnon (1920–1924)
- Thomas Brousseau (1924–1925, 1931–1932, 1943–1951)
- Wilfrid Doucet (1925–1927)
- Joseph Gagnon (1927–1931, 1932–1933)
- Cajetan Rousseau (1933–1934)
- Zephir St-Gelais (1935–1943)
- Pierre-Omer Berube (1951–1954)
- Maurice Chamberland (1954–1961)
- Diogène Dumont (1961–1967)
- Robert St-Gelais (1967–1983)
- Réal Michaud (1983–1999)
- Francis Desjardins (1999–2001)
- Réginald Duguay (2001–2017)
- Gino Canuel (2017–present)

== See also ==
- List of parish municipalities in Quebec
