= Saint-René-de-Matane =

- Municipality
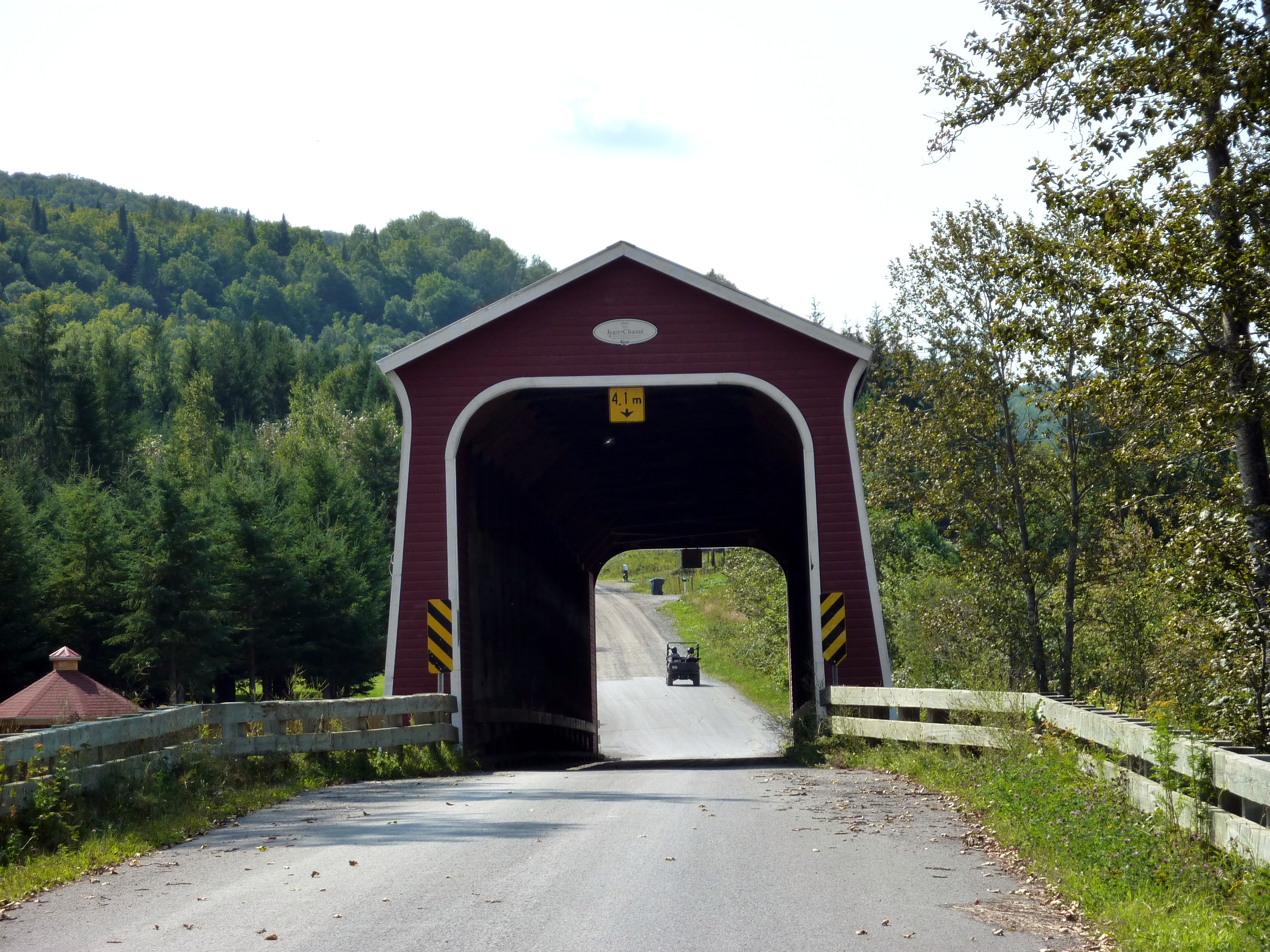
- Jean-Chassé covered bridge
- Motto: Agriculture, Nature, Sylviculture ("Agriculture, Nature, Forestry")
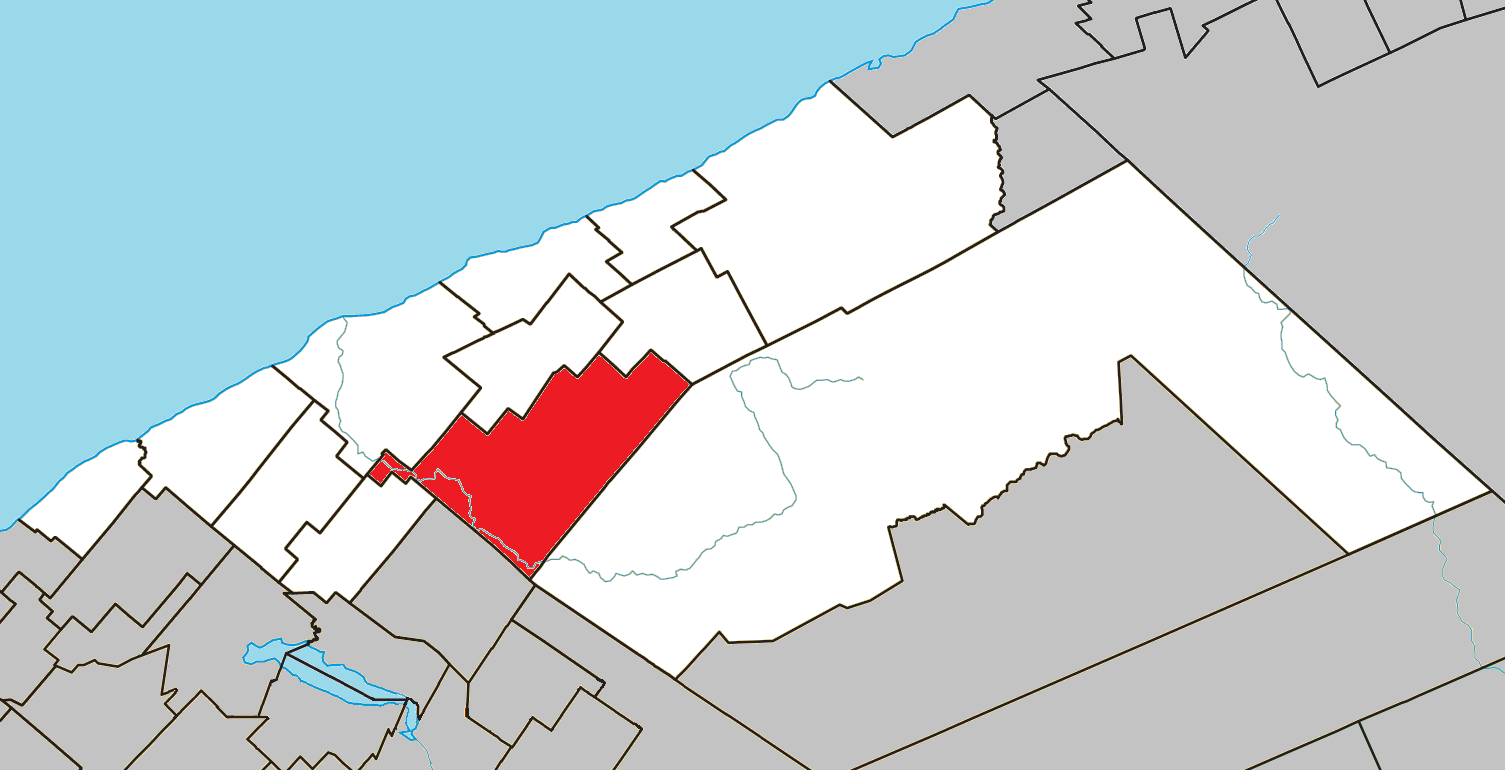
- Location within La Matanie RCM

- Location in eastern Quebec
- Coordinates: 48°42′N 67°23′W
- Country: Canada
- Province: Quebec
- Region: Bas-Saint-Laurent
- RCM: La Matanie
- Constituted: December 18, 1982

Government
  - Mayor: Rémi Fortin
  - Federal riding: Gaspésie—Les Îles-de-la-Madeleine—Listuguj
  - Prov. riding: Matane-Matapédia-Mitis

Area
  - Total: 258.29 km^{2} (99.73 sq mi)
  - Land: 253.89 km^{2} (98.03 sq mi)

Population (2021)
  - Total: 961
  - Density: 3.8/km^{2} (9.8/sq mi)
  - Pop (2016-21): ▼3.0%
  - Dwellings: 596
- Time zone: UTC−5 (EST)
  - Summer (DST): UTC−4 (EDT)
- Postal code(s): G0J 3E0
- Area codes: 418 and 581
- Highways: R-195
- Website: www.saintrene.ca

Saint-René-de-Matane (French pronunciation: [sɛ̃ ʁəne də matan]) is a municipality in Quebec, Canada.

In addition to main population centre of Saint-René located along Quebec Route 195, the municipality also includes the communities of Le Renversé, Rivière-Matane, Ruisseau-Gagnon, and Village-à-Dancause.

== History ==
The Municipality of Saint-René-de-Matane was formed on December 18, 1982, through the merger of the Parish Municipalities of Saint-René-de-Matane and Saint-Nil, founded in 1965 and 1974 respectively. Its name comes from René Goupil, a Canadian martyr canonized in 1930.

== Geography ==
Saint-René-de-Matane is located on the southern slope of the St. Lawrence River, 430 kilometres (270 mi) northeast of Quebec City and 110 kilometres (68 mi) northeast of Rimouski. Major cities near Saint-René-de-Matane are Matane, 25 kilometres (16 mi) to the north, Sayabec, 35 kilometres (22 mi) to the west, Amqui, 35 kilometres (22 mi) and Causapscal, 55 kilometres (34 mi) to the south. The municipality is located on Route 195, which connects Matane to Amqui, between Saint-Vianney to the south and Matane to the north. This road runs along the Matane River in its section crossing the municipality. The territory of the municipality, covering an area of 256 square kilometres (99 sq mi), also includes the Petite rivière Matane and the Gagnon stream.

The municipality of Saint-René-de-Matane is part of La Matanie Regional County Municipality in the administrative region of Bas-Saint-Laurent. In addition to the main hamlet of Saint-René, the municipality is made up of four hamlets: Le Renversé, Rivière-Matane, Ruisseau-Gagnon and Village-à-Dancause.

== Demographics ==
=== Population ===
Canada census – Saint-René-de-Matane community profile

	2021	2016	2011
Population	961 (-3.0% from 2016)	991 (-9.0% from 2011)	1,089 (+1.8% from 2006)
Land area	253.89 km^{2} (98.03 sq mi)	255.26 km^{2} (98.56 sq mi)	255.39 km^{2} (98.61 sq mi)
Population density	3.8/km^{2} (9.8/sq mi)	3.9/km^{2} (10/sq mi)	4.3/km^{2} (11/sq mi)
Median age	54.4 (M: 56.0, F: 52.4)	51.9 (M: 53.4, F: 49.6)	48.1 (M: 48.6, F: 46.9)
Private dwellings	596 (total) 478 (occupied)	659 (total) 468 (occupied)	639 (total)
Median household income	$56,800	$47,232	$39,263

Notes: 2016 Data based on population and dwelling count amendments.
References: 2021 2016 2011

Historical Census Data - Saint-René-de-Matane, Quebec

Year	Pop.	±%
1986	1,189	—
1991	1,081	−9.1%
1996	1,065	−1.5%
2001	968	−9.1%

Year	Pop.	±%
2006	1,070	+10.5%
2011	1,089	+1.8%
2016	991	−9.0%
2021	961	−3.0%

2016 Population based on revised count. Population counts are not adjusted for boundary changes.
Source: Statistics Canada

Mother tongue:

- English as first language: 0%
- French as first language: 99.5%
- English and French as first language: 0.5%
- Other as first language: 0%

== Government ==
List of former mayors:

- Jean Yves Murray (1982–1992)
- Colombe Canuel Lagacé (1992–2000)
- Jean Charles Gagnon (2000–2009)
- Sylvain Audit (2009–2011)
- Roger Vaillancourt (2011–2015)
- Harold Chassé (2015–2017)
- Rémi Fortin (2017–present)

== See also ==
- List of municipalities in Quebec
