= Mathieu Damours =

French politician (1657–1696)

Mathieu Damours (d’Amours) de Freneuse (baptized March 14, 1657 – 1696) was a seigneur in Acadia and member of the Conseil Souverain of New France. He was the son of Mathieu Damours de Chauffours and Marie Marsolet.

== Sources ==
- MacBeath, George (1979) [1966]. "Damours de Freneuse, Mathieu". In Brown, George Williams (ed.). Dictionary of Canadian Biography. Vol. I (1000–1700) (online ed.). University of Toronto Press.
