= Rivière-Bonjour, Quebec =

Rivière-Bonjour
- Unorganized territory
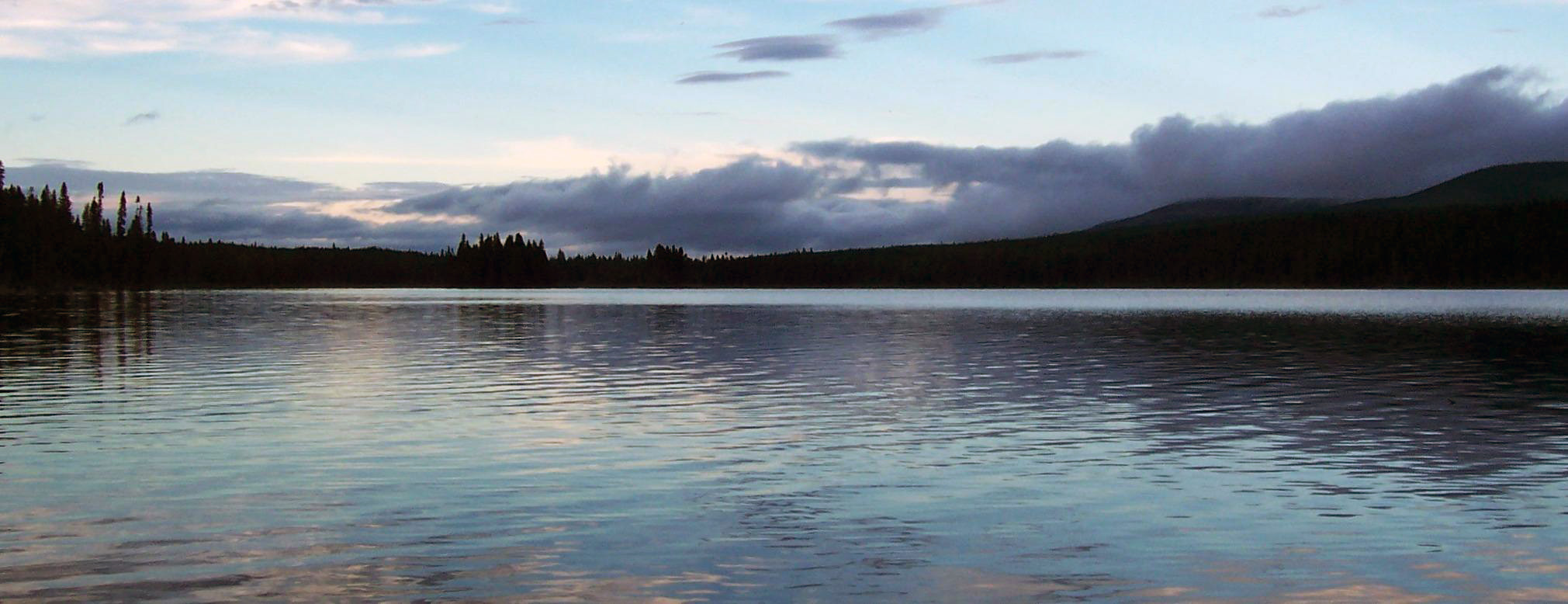

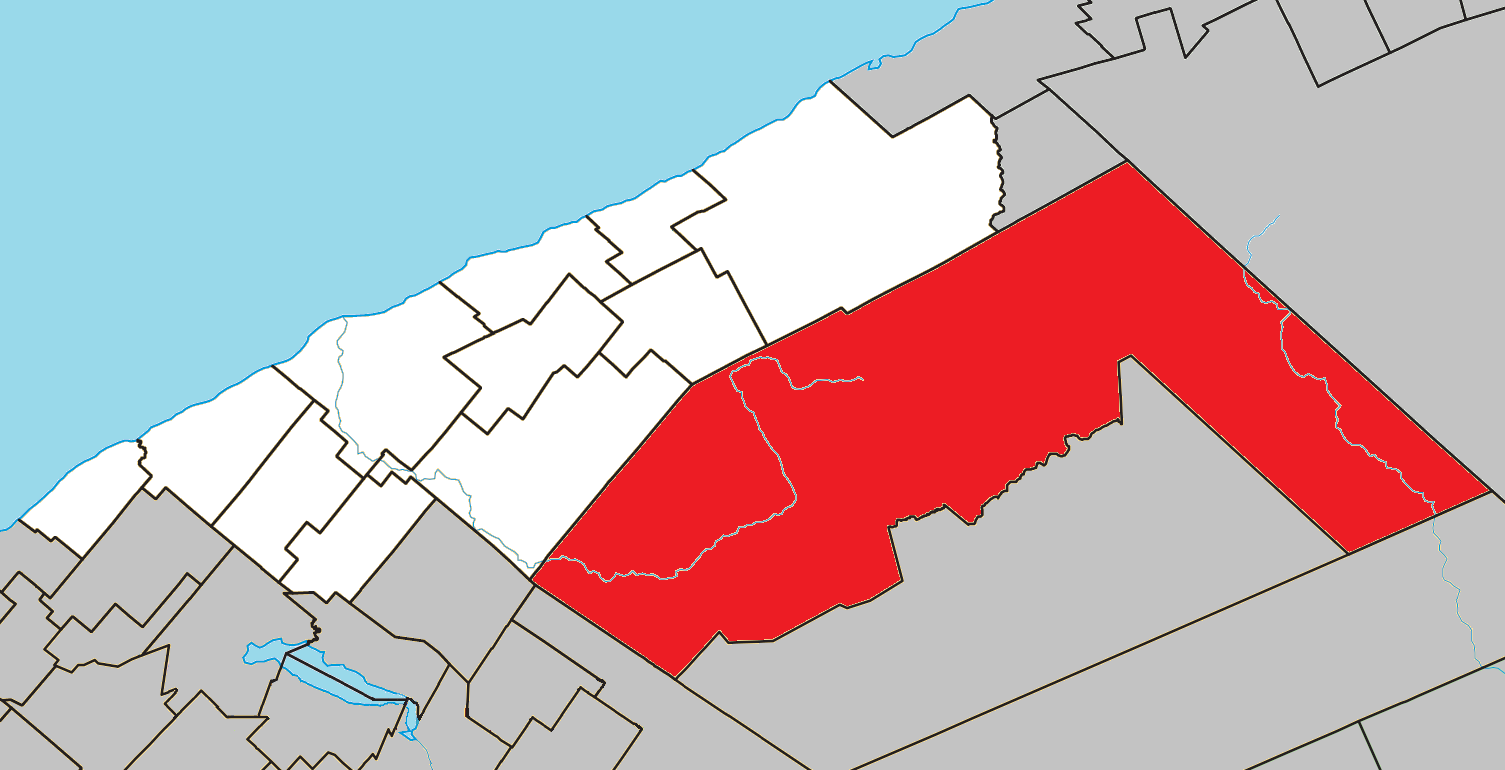
- Location within La Matanie RCM

- Location in eastern Quebec
- Coordinates: 48°46′N 66°55′W
- Country: Canada
- Province: Quebec
- Region: Bas-Saint-Laurent
- RCM: La Matanie
- Constituted: January 1, 1986

Government
  - Fed. riding: Gaspésie—Les Îles-de-la-Madeleine—Listuguj
  - Prov. riding: Matane-Matapédia-Mitis

Area
  - Total: 1,694.99 km^{2} (654.44 sq mi)
  - Land: 1,682.50 km^{2} (649.62 sq mi)

Population (2021)
  - Total: 16
  - Density: 0/km^{2} (0/sq mi)
  - Change (2016-21): ▲ N/A
  - Dwellings: 67
- Time zone: UTC-5 (EST)
  - Summer (DST): UTC-4 (EDT)
- Area codes: 418, 581
- Highways: R-299

Rivière-Bonjour (French pronunciation: [ʁivjɛʁ bɔ̃ʒuʁ]) is an unorganized territory in the Bas-Saint-Laurent region of Quebec, Canada. A large part of the territory is part of the Matane Wildlife Reserve. Other portions of the territory are partially within the Gaspésie National Park, Rivière-Cascapédia Wildlife Reserve, and Zec de Cap-Chat. Outdoor recreation and forestry are the main activities.

The eponymous Bonjour River is a 15 kilometres (9.3 mi) long stream roughly in the centre of the territory that has its source at the south-eastern slopes of the Chic-Choc Mountains, including the 1,065 metres (3,494 ft) high Mont Blanc. The stream joins the Matane River at Matane Lake.

== Demographics ==
=== Population ===
Canada census – Rivière-Bonjour community profile

	2021	2016	2011
Population	16 (% from 2016)	0 (-100% from 2011)	10 (-33.3% from 2006)
Land area	1,682.50 km^{2} (649.62 sq mi)	1,678.95 km^{2} (648.25 sq mi)	1,681.79 km^{2} (649.34 sq mi)
Population density	0.0/km^{2} (0/sq mi)	0.0/km^{2} (0/sq mi)	0.0/km^{2} (0/sq mi)
Median age	.N/A (M: , F: )	.N/A (M: , F: )	.N/A (M: , F: )
Private dwellings	67 (total) 8 (occupied)	144 (total) 0 (occupied)	145 (total)
Median household income	$.N/A	$.N/A	$.N/A

Notes: Median age & income data for this area has been suppressed for data quality or confidentiality reasons.
2016 population and dwellings based on revised count.
References: 2021 2016 2011

Historical Census Data - Rivière-Bonjour, Quebec

Year	Pop.	±%
1991	0	—
1996	0	0.00%
2001	0	0.00%
2006	15	—

Year	Pop.	±%
2011	10	−33.3%
2016	0	−100.0%
2021	16	—

Population figures based on revised counts.
Source: Statistics Canada

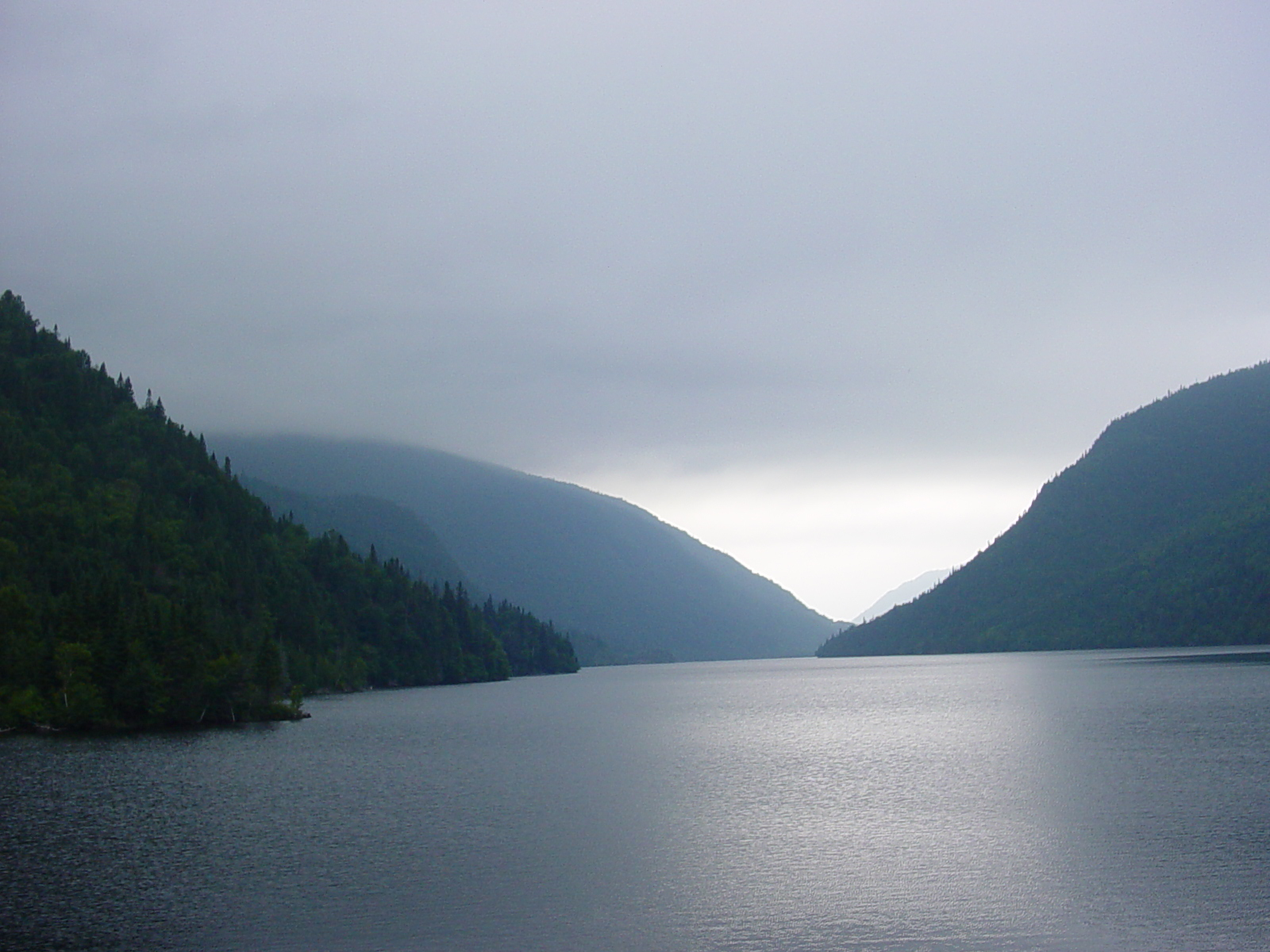
Lake Matane in the Matane Wildlife Reserve

== See also ==
- List of unorganized territories in Quebec
