= Matane =

- Town
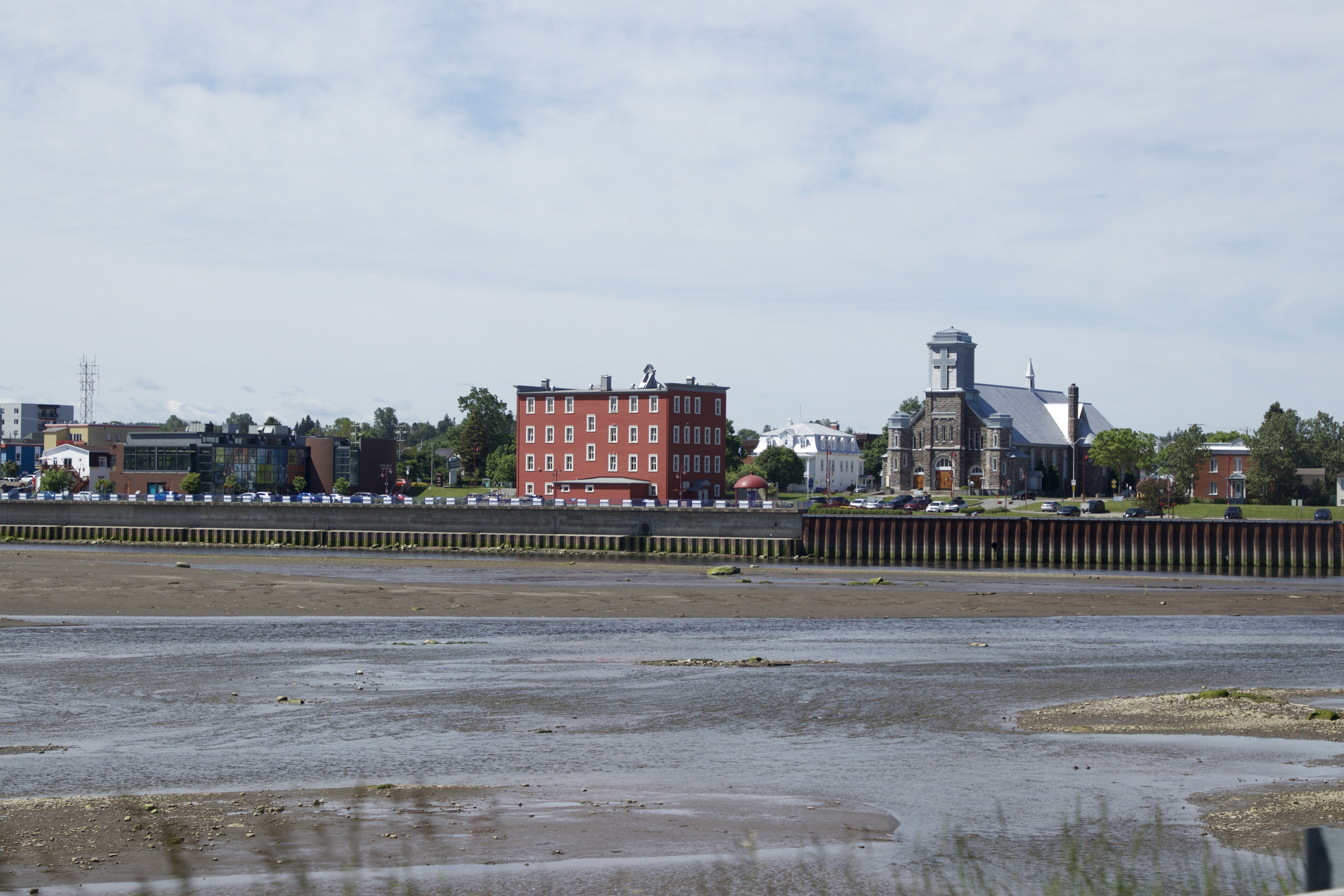

- Coat of arms
- Motto: Le succès dans l'effort (Success in effort)
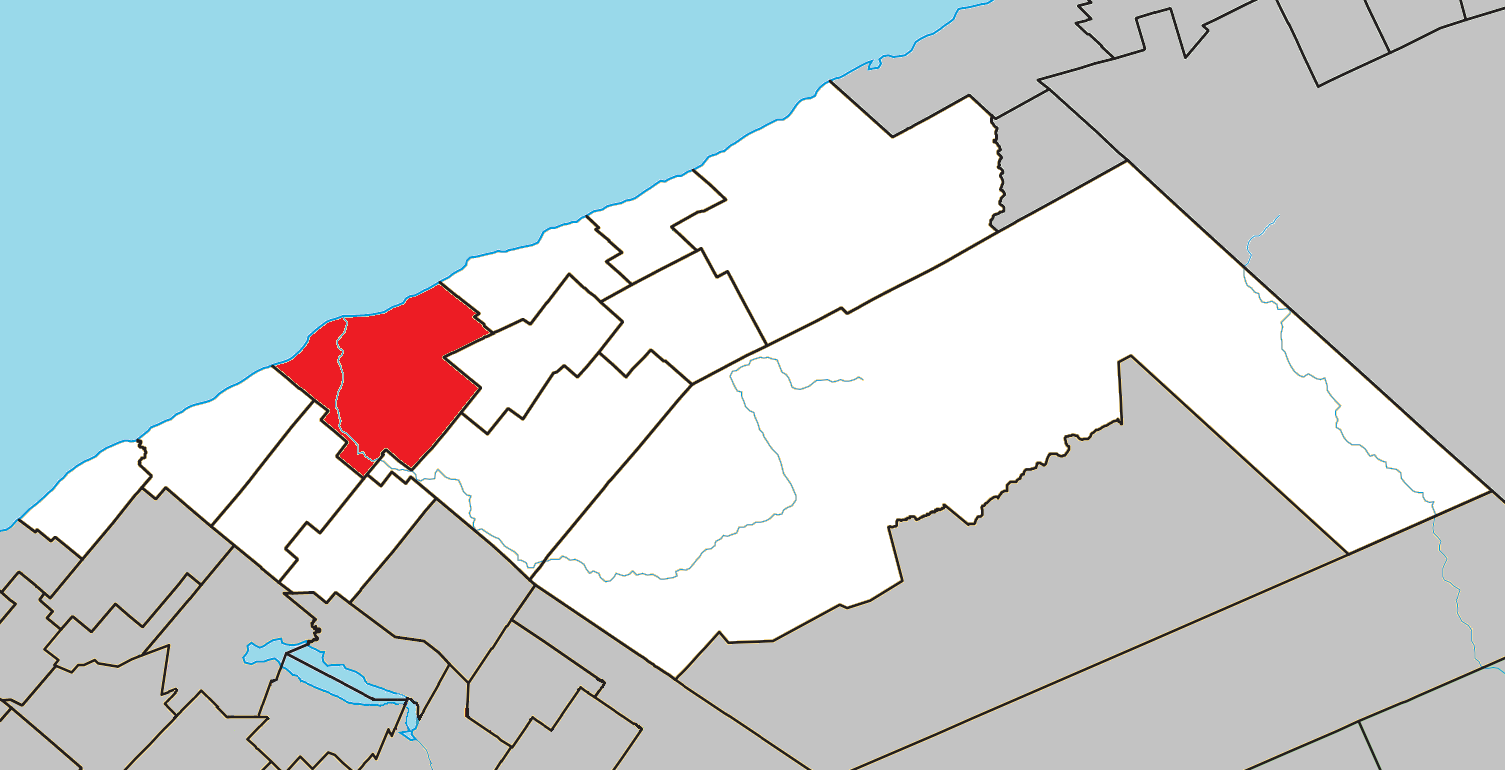
- Location within La Matanie RCM

- Location in eastern Quebec
- Coordinates: 48°51′N 67°32′W
- Country: Canada
- Province: Quebec
- Region: Bas-Saint-Laurent
- RCM: La Matanie
- Settled: 1670s
- Constituted: September 26, 2001

Government
  - Mayor: Eddy Métivier
  - Fed. riding: Gaspésie—Les Îles-de-la-Madeleine—Listuguj
  - Prov. riding: Matane-Matapédia-Mitis

Area
  - Total: 230.44 km^{2} (88.97 sq mi)
  - Land: 195.49 km^{2} (75.48 sq mi)
  - Urban: 10.16 km^{2} (3.92 sq mi)
  - Metro: 865.87 km^{2} (334.31 sq mi)

Population (2021)
  - Total: 13,987
  - Density: 71.5/km^{2} (185/sq mi)
  - Urban: 10,371
  - Urban density: 1,020.7/km^{2} (2,644/sq mi)
  - Metro: 18,474
  - Metro density: 21.3/km^{2} (55/sq mi)
  - Change (2016–21): ▼2.3%
  - Dwellings: 7,482
- Demonym(s): Matanais, Matanaises
- Time zone: UTC−5 (EST)
  - Summer (DST): UTC−4 (EDT)
- Postal code(s): G4W
- Area codes: 418, 581
- Highways: R-132 R-195
- Geographical code: 24 08053
- Website: www.ville.matane.qc.ca

Matane (French pronunciation: [matan]) is a town on the Gaspé Peninsula in Quebec, Canada, on the south shore of the Saint Lawrence River at the mouth of the Matane River. The town is the seat for the La Matanie Regional County Municipality.

In addition to Matane itself, the town's territory also includes the communities of Petit-Matane and Saint-Luc-de-Matane.

There is a ferry service which crosses the river to Baie-Comeau and Godbout on the north shore as well as a rail ferry service to Baie-Comeau and Sept-Îles.

The name Matane was first assigned to the river by Samuel de Champlain as "Mantanne" in 1603. Its meaning is open to different interpretations, with the most common one being that it comes from the Mi'kmaq word mtctan meaning "beaver pond", since the region had an abundant beaver population. It could also be a Maliseet word for "spinal cord", referring to the course of the Matane River; or from the word Mattawa/Matawin, meaning "meeting of the waters". Finally, it could be an abbreviation of the word matandipives, meaning "shipwreck".

== History ==
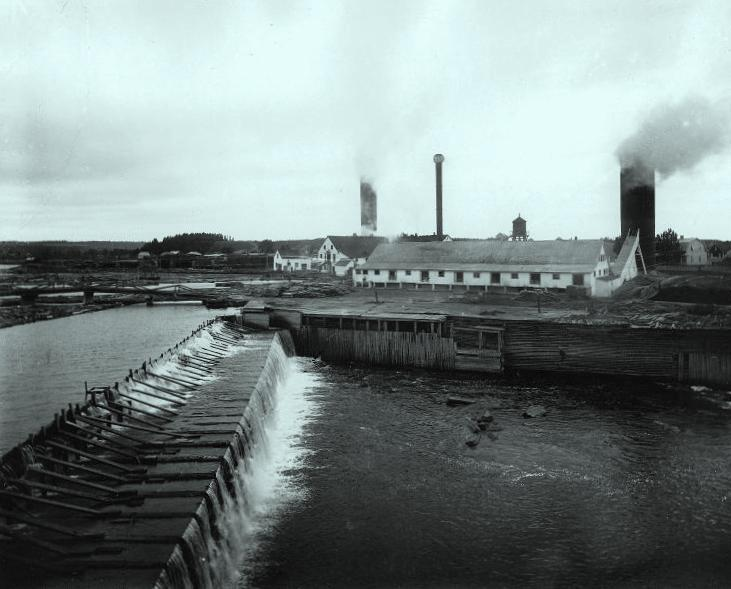
Lumber mill of Price Company, Matane, circa 1914

In 1603, Samuel de Champlain visited the area and considered the location as "pleasant enough". In 1616 merchants known as the Rochelais from La Rochelle were the first Europeans to spend the winter. Matane was used as a trading post for the Rochelais who were exchanging European goods for furs with the Mi'kmaq people. In 1672, the land on both sides of the Matane River was granted as a seignory to Mathieu D'Amours, which led to the first settlements shortly after. The Mi'kmaq people lived there until 1845.

In 1845, the place was first incorporated as the Municipality of Matane, but dissolved two years later. In 1855, it was reestablished as the Parish Municipality of Saint-Jérôme-de-Matane, named after the local parish. In 1893, the main population centre at the mouth of the Matane River separated from the parish municipality and was incorporated as the Village Municipality of Saint-Jérôme-de-Matane, which changed status and name to City of Matane in 1937 when city status was granted.

After World War II, Matane merchants decided to strengthen their economic and maritime bonds with the North side of the Saint Lawrence River. They ran a service of a regular ferry in 1962. In 1978 a train ferry system was in place.

On September 26, 2001, the neighbouring municipalities of Petit-Matane, Saint-Luc-de-Matane, and Saint-Jérôme-de-Matane were amalgamated into the Town of Matane.

== Geography ==
The town is divided in 4 districts that match the former municipalities before amalgamation in 2001:

- District 1 - Matane
- District 2 - Saint-Jérome-de-Matane
- District 3 - Petit-Matane
- District 4 - Saint-Luc-de-Matane

== Demographics ==
In the 2021 Census of Population conducted by Statistics Canada, Matane had a population of 13,987 living in 6,996 of its 7,482 total private dwellings, a change of −2.3% from its 2016 population of 14,311. With a land area of 195.49 km^{2} (75.48 sq mi), it had a population density of 71.5/km^{2} (185.3/sq mi) in 2021.

Canada census – Matane community profile

	2021	2016	2011
Population	13,987 (-2.3% from 2016)	14,311 (-1.0% from 2011)	14,462 (-1.9% from 2006)
Land area	195.49 km^{2} (75.48 sq mi)	196.08 km^{2} (75.71 sq mi)	195.47 km^{2} (75.47 sq mi)
Population density	71.5/km^{2} (185/sq mi)	73/km^{2} (190/sq mi)	74.0/km^{2} (192/sq mi)
Median age	52.4 (M: 50.0, F: 54.4)	52.3 (M: 50.5, F: 53.7)	49.7 (M: 48.2, F: 50.9)
Private dwellings	7,482 (total) 6,996 (occupied)	7,421 (total)	7,293 (total)
Median household income	$56,000	$48,094	$42,906

References: 2021 2016 2011

Historical census populations – Matane

Year	Pop.	±%
1901	1,176	—
1911	2,056	+74.8%
1921	3,050	+48.3%
1931	4,757	+56.0%
1941	4,633	−2.6%
1951	6,345	+37.0%
1956	8,069	+27.2%

Year	Pop.	±%
1961	9,190	+13.9%
1966	11,109	+20.9%
1971	11,841	+6.6%
1976	12,726	+7.5%
1981	13,612	+7.0%
1986	13,243	−2.7%
1991	12,756	−3.7%

Year	Pop.	±%
1996	12,364	−3.1%
2001	11,635	−5.9%
2006	14,742	+26.7%
2011	14,462	−1.9%
2016	14,311	−1.0%
2021	13,987	−2.3%

Population counts are not adjusted for boundary changes and amalgamations.
Source: Statistics Canada

Counting both single and multiple responses, the most commonly identified ethnocultural ancestries were (2021):

- Canadian: 37.6%
- French: 25.4%
- Québécois: 13.8%
- French Canadian: 13.5%
- Scottish: 2.8%
- Irish: 2.7%
- Caucasian: 1.7%
- "Christian": 1.7%
- First Nations: 1.7%
- English: 1.6%
- Gaspesian: 1.5%
- Acadian: 1.2%
- Métis: 1.0%

(Percentages may total more than 100% due to rounding and multiple responses).

Mother tongue (2021):

- English as first language: 0.5%
- French as first language: 98.5%
- English and French as first language: 0.4%
- Other as first language: 0.5%

== Economy ==
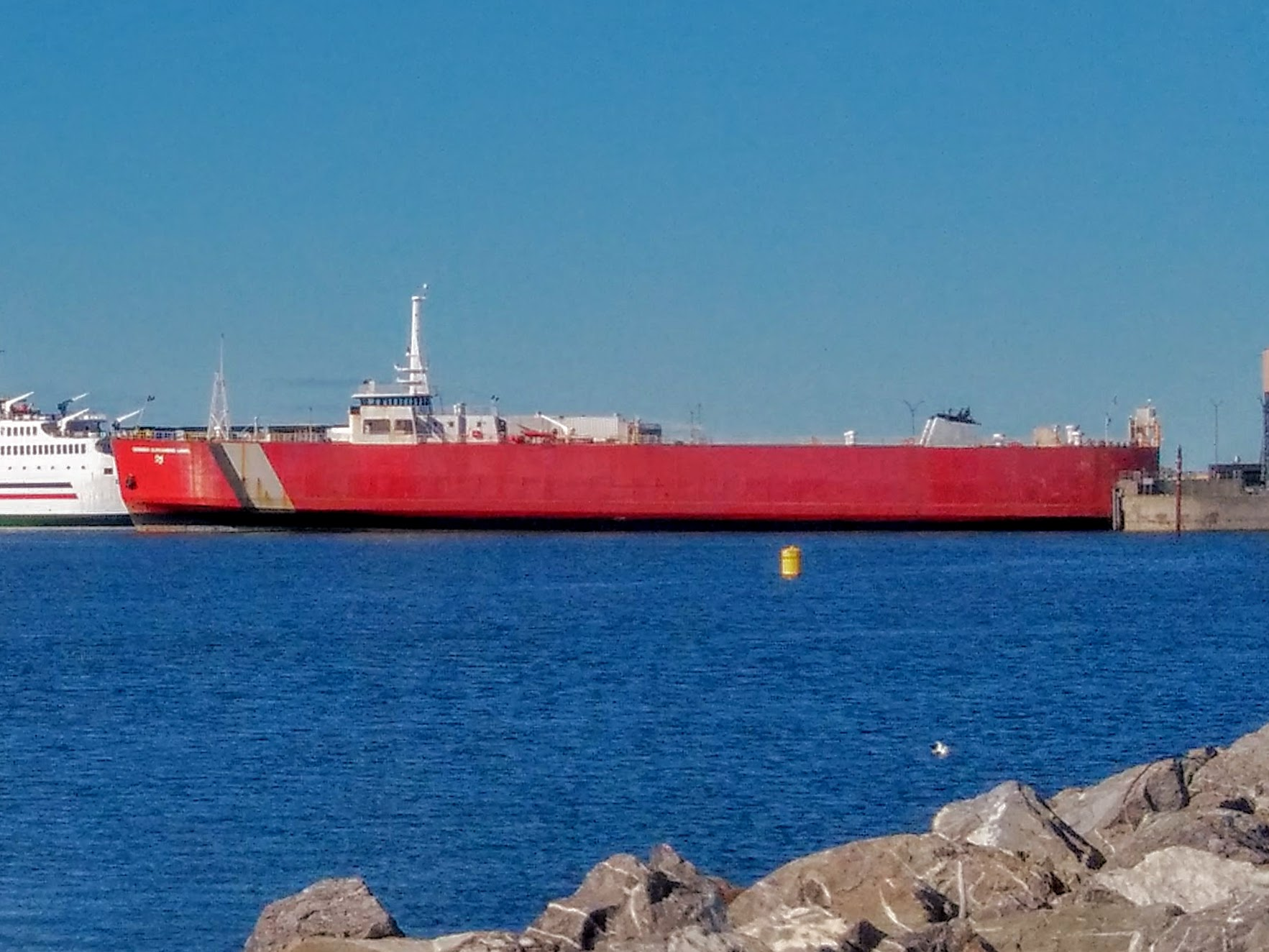
MV Georges-Alexandre-Lebel train ferry of the COGEMA in Matane

Matane has a diversified economy. The city is known for its shrimp, which are processed there: the northern prawn (known locally as crevettes de Matane) are renowned throughout the world for their high quality. Recent advances in wind power have also helped raise awareness of the region. Matane has the largest wind farm in Quebec in addition to having two windmill manufacturing plants: Marmen and Enercon.

The city also has a Sappi factory in the field of pulp and paper (separated thermochemical pulp). There is also a pork product processing plant: Les Cuisines gaspésiennes, which exports to the United States and China. Matane also has a shipyard and a large concrete pipe factory, Béton Provincial, and a sawmill.

Matane was also home of the first Dollarama which opened in April 1992. The former Larry Rossy chain decided to transform its banner into Dollarama and, with the success of the Matane store, the management decided to change all the Larry Rossy banners into Dolloramas.

== Local government ==
List of former mayors:

- François Dionne (1893–1895)
- Alexander Fraser (1895–1896)
- L. J. Levasseur (1896–1897, 1907–1910)
- Johnny Joncas (1897–1898)
- Georges L. Pelletier (1898)
- Louis Durette (1898–1899)
- Georges Santerre (1899–1900)
- L. Horace Chouinard (1900–1904, 1905–1906)
- Gustave A. Côté (1904–1905)
- Alfred Bouillon (1906–1907, 1911–1913)
- J. B. E. Bergeron (1910–1911)
- Pierre Langlois (1913–1914)
- Octave Dionne (1914–1915)
- C. E. Bernier (1915–1917, 1923)
- Joseph Eugène Arthur Bergeron (1917–1921, 1925–1936)
- J. E. Heppel (1921–1922)
- J. A. Lavoie (1922–1923)
- Hector Gagnon (1923–1925)
- Raoul Fafard (1936–1939, 1941–1948)
- J. A. Rouleau (1939–1941)
- J. Charles Gagnon (1948–1951)
- Léandre Thibault (1951–1954)
- J. Arthur Desjardins (1954–1960)
- Félix-Adrien Gauthier (1960–1963)
- Roger Dion (1963–1985)
- Maurice Gauthier (1985–1993, 1997–2001)
- Denise Gentil (1993–1997)
- Linda Cormier (2001–2009)
- Claude Canuel (2009–2013)
- Jérôme Landry (2013–2021)
- Eddy Métivier (2021–present)

== Attractions ==
Parc-des-Îles bridge from the Mathieu D'Amours dam

Since Matane is the first step to Gaspé's tourist circuit it receives and accommodates many passing tourists. The old lighthouse of Matane was transformed into a tourist information centre with a panoramic view of its surroundings. There are a number of art galleries in Matane that support local talent.

The Matane River is known as the "River-School" in Quebec because so many people learn to fish there. The river itself is 101 km (63 mi) in length and is the only place in Quebec where you can fish in the town square.

In 2000, Matane was named East Quebec's industrial capital.

== Notable people ==
A number of people from Matane and the area are well known locally or internationally, including artist Claude Picher and NHL player Yves Racine.

Other notable people born in Matane:

- Pascal Bérubé, politician
- Nancy Charest, politician
- Alain Côté (ice hockey, born 1957)
- Georges Dionne, politician
- Bruno Langlois, cyclist
- Sonia LeBel, politician
- Jacques Lemieux, NHL ice hockey player
- Joseph Rouleau, opera singer
- Ève Salvail, model
- Richard Z. Sirois, comedian
- Rodrigue Tremblay, economist

== See also ==
- COGEMA
- List of cities in Quebec
- Société des traversiers du Québec
