= Quebec Route 195 =

Highway in Quebec, Canada

Route 195

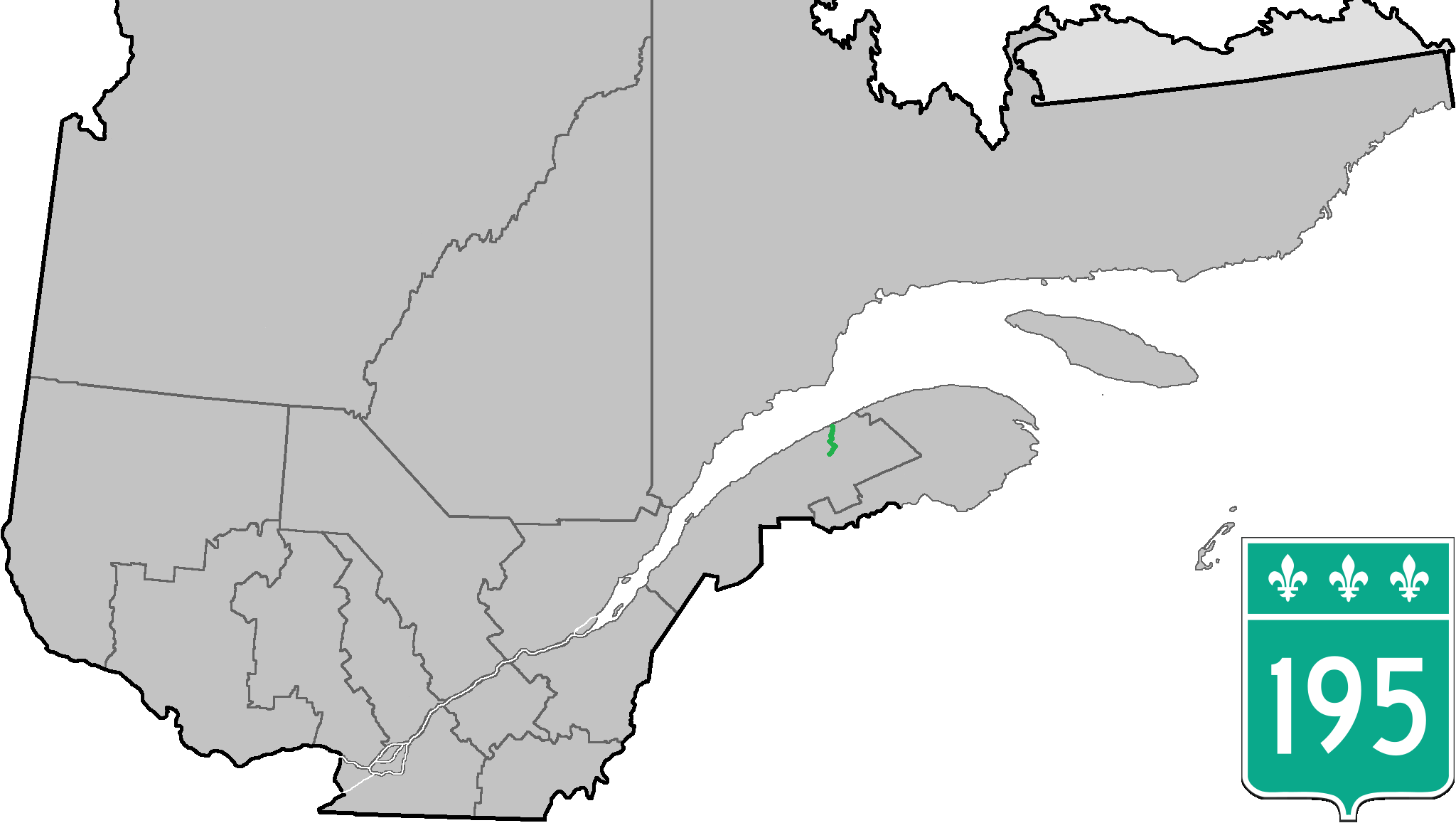

Route information
- Maintained by Transports Québec
- Length: 87.1 km (54.1 mi)

Major junctions
- South end: Route-des-Étangs in Saint-Zénon-du-Lac-Humqui
- R-132 in Amqui
- North end: R-132 in Matane

Location
- Country: Canada
- Province: Quebec
- Major cities: Amqui, Matane

Highway system
- Quebec provincial highways; Autoroutes; List; Former
← R-185	→ R-197

Route 195 is an 87 km two-lane north/south highway in Quebec, Canada, which starts in Matane at the junction of Route 132 and ends in Saint-Zénon-du-Lac-Humqui. The highway acts mainly as a shortcut between Matane and the southern section of Route 132 which leads to the Matapédia River Valley and the southern part of the Gaspé Peninsula.

== Municipalities along Route 195 ==
- Saint-Zénon-du-Lac-Humqui
- Saint-Léon-le-Grand
- Amqui
- Saint-Tharcisius
- Saint-Vianney
- Saint-René-de-Matane
- Matane

== See also ==
- List of Quebec provincial highways
