= Cap-Chat =

- City
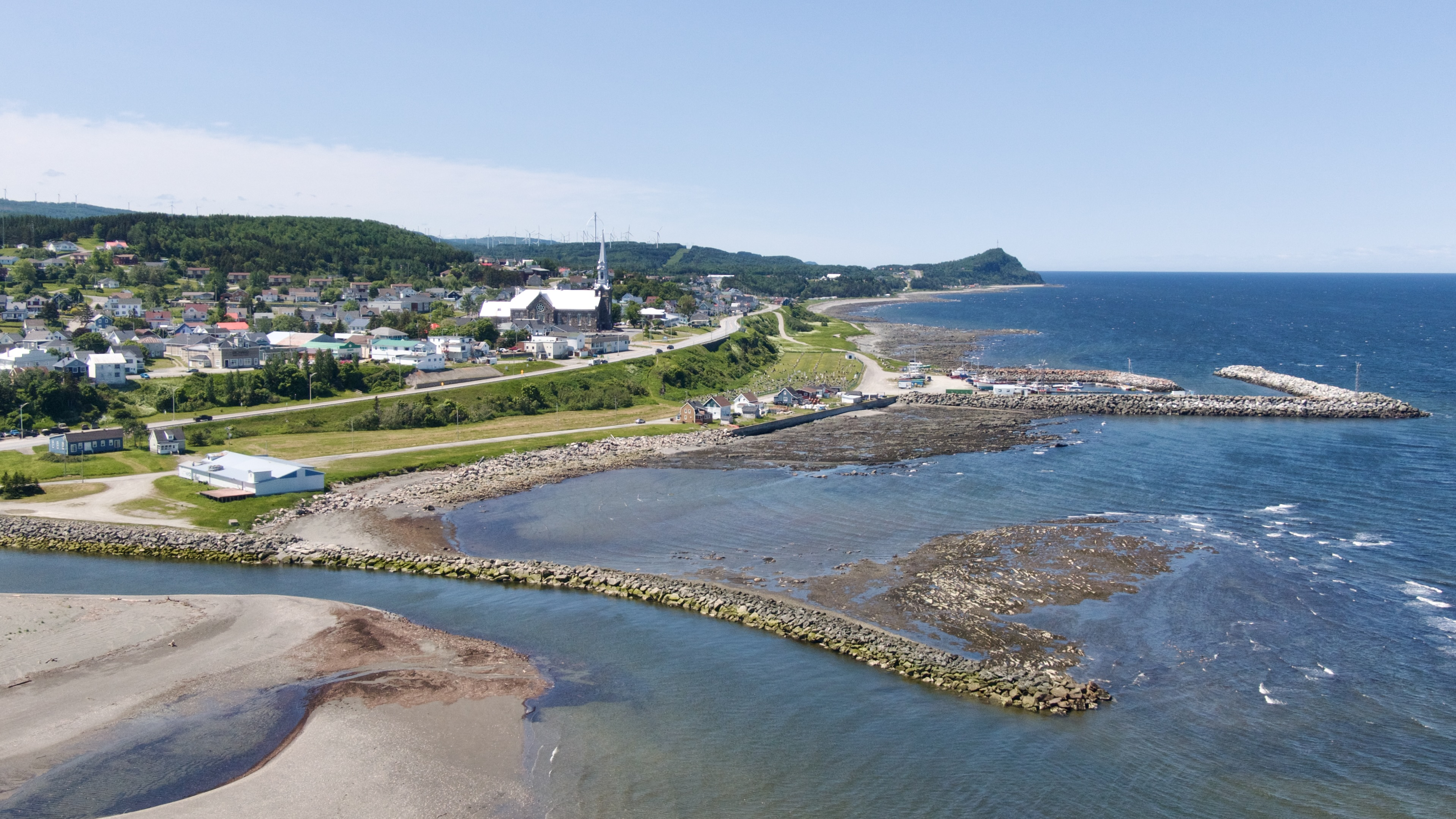
- View of the harbour at Cap-Chat, Quebec

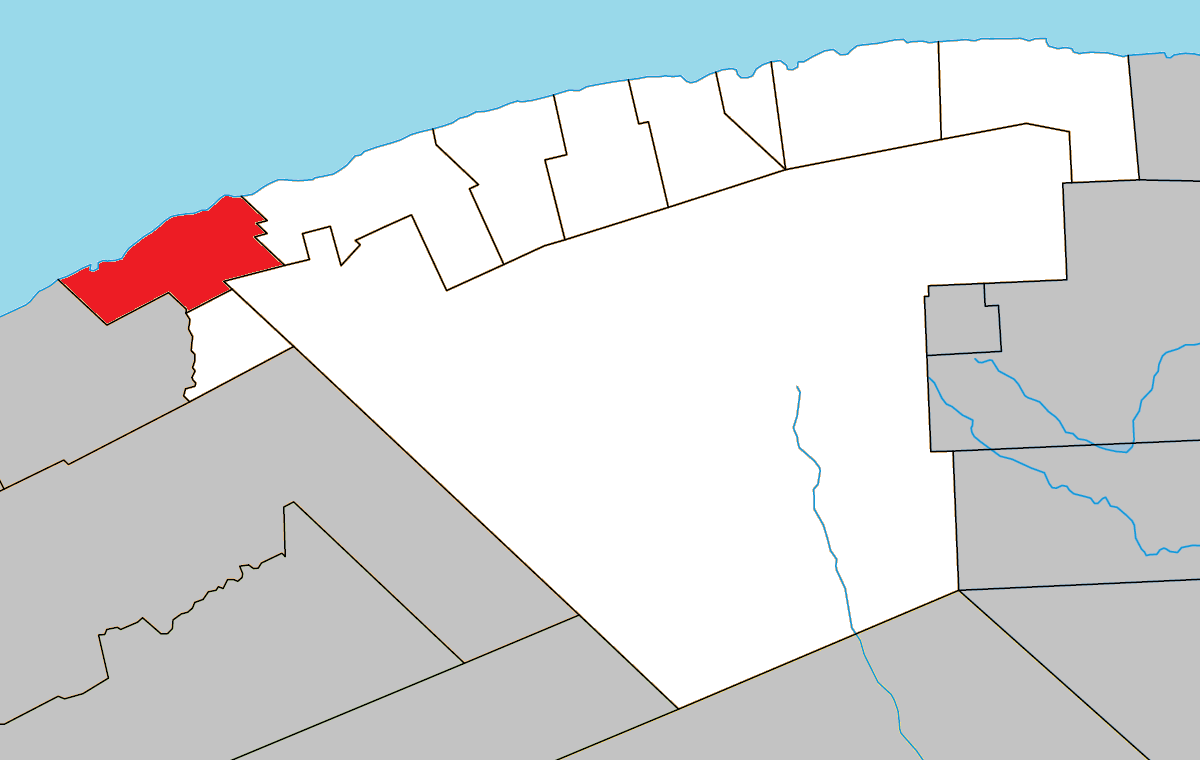
- Location within La Haute-Gaspésie RCM

- Location in eastern Quebec
- Coordinates: 49°06′N 66°41′W
- Country: Canada
- Province: Quebec
- Region: Gaspésie–Îles-de-la-Madeleine
- RCM: La Haute-Gaspésie
- Settled: 1815
- Constituted: March 15, 2000

Government
  - Mayor: Marcel Soucy
  - Federal riding: Gaspésie—Les Îles-de-la-Madeleine—Listuguj
  - Prov. riding: Gaspé

Area
  - Total: 208.99 km^{2} (80.69 sq mi)
  - Land: 181.31 km^{2} (70.00 sq mi)

Population (2021)
  - Total: 2,516
  - Density: 13.9/km^{2} (36/sq mi)
  - Pop 2016-2021: ▲1.6%
  - Dwellings: 1,405
- Time zone: UTC−5 (EST)
  - Summer (DST): UTC−4 (EDT)
- Postal code(s): G0J 1E0
- Area codes: 418 and 581
- Highways: R-132
- Website: ville.cap-chat.ca

Cap-Chat (French pronunciation: [kap ʃa]) is a town in the Canadian province of Québec, in the Regional County Municipality of Haute-Gaspésie, and in the administrative region of Gaspésie-Îles-de-la-Madeleine. Cap-Chat is found 16 kilometres (9.9 mi) west of Sainte-Anne-des-Monts. As of 2021, Cap-Chat's population is 2,516.

In addition to Cap-Chat itself, the town's territory also includes the communities of Cap-Chat-Est, Capucins, and Petit-Fonds.

== History ==
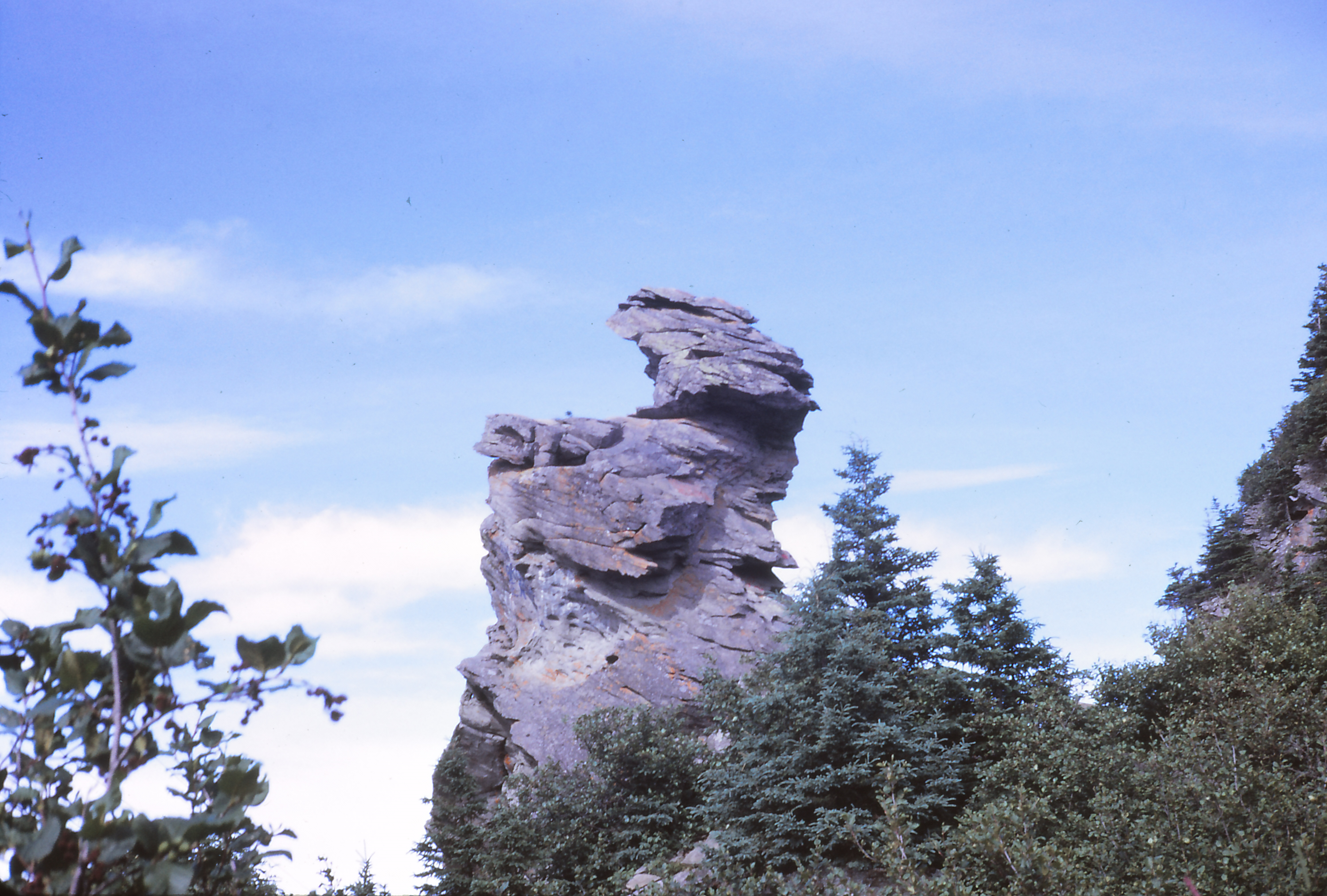
The Cat Rock in Cap-Chat

There are two theories about the origin of the town's name. One simply holds that the headland called Cap-Chat bore a likeness to a cat ("chat" in French). The other theory is a bit more fanciful. According to a local legend, a cat walking along the shore killed and ate various animals, whereupon the "cat fairy" accused him of having eaten her offspring. For his punishment, the cat was turned into stone forever.

It seems most likely, however, that the town's name is a corruption of "Aymar de Chaste", who was New France's lieutenant-general in 1603. Samuel de Champlain named this area C. de Chatte in 1612, then Cap de Chatte in 1626. The name became Cap de Chat in 1685.

The waterfront boardwalk at Cap-Chat has a display of photographs and informative plaques regarding the Second World War Battle of the St. Lawrence between U-Boats and coastal defence ships.

On October 19, 1968, The Town of Cap-Chat was formed through the merger of Parish Municipality of Saint-Norbert-du-Cap-Chat and the Village Municipality of Cap-Chat.

Cap-Chat was one of the prime viewing areas for the total solar eclipse of July 10, 1972. Unfortunately, cloudy skies prevented most observers from viewing the total phase of the eclipse.

On March 15, 2000, the Municipality of Capucins was amalgamated into the Town of Cap-Chat.

== Climate ==
Climate data for Cap-Chat (1991−2020 normals, extremes 1993–present)
Month	Jan	Feb	Mar	Apr	May	Jun	Jul	Aug	Sep	Oct	Nov	Dec	Year
Record high °C (°F)	14.7 (58.5)	12.9 (55.2)	15.6 (60.1)	21.8 (71.2)	27.8 (82.0)	33.5 (92.3)	31.4 (88.5)	34.5 (94.1)	32.5 (90.5)	24.9 (76.8)	22.7 (72.9)	18.1 (64.6)	34.5 (94.1)
Mean daily maximum °C (°F)	−6.1 (21.0)	−5.8 (21.6)	−1.2 (29.8)	4.6 (40.3)	11.1 (52.0)	16.5 (61.7)	19.7 (67.5)	19.1 (66.4)	15.3 (59.5)	9.3 (48.7)	3.8 (38.8)	−1.9 (28.6)	7.0 (44.6)
Daily mean °C (°F)	−10.0 (14.0)	−9.7 (14.5)	−5.0 (23.0)	1.4 (34.5)	7.3 (45.1)	12.6 (54.7)	16.1 (61.0)	15.6 (60.1)	11.6 (52.9)	6.0 (42.8)	0.8 (33.4)	−5.0 (23.0)	3.5 (38.3)
Mean daily minimum °C (°F)	−13.9 (7.0)	−13.3 (8.1)	−8.7 (16.3)	−1.9 (28.6)	3.5 (38.3)	8.6 (47.5)	12.4 (54.3)	12.0 (53.6)	7.9 (46.2)	2.7 (36.9)	−2.2 (28.0)	−8.2 (17.2)	−0.1 (31.8)
Record low °C (°F)	−33.1 (−27.6)	−29.2 (−20.6)	−26.9 (−16.4)	−15.6 (3.9)	−3.6 (25.5)	−1.2 (29.8)	5.7 (42.3)	2.3 (36.1)	−0.8 (30.6)	−6.0 (21.2)	−14.0 (6.8)	−26.3 (−15.3)	−33.1 (−27.6)
Average relative humidity (%) (at 15:00 LST)	77.3	76.0	74.6	72.5	72.5	74.2	76.4	76.9	77.8	78.6	77.0	79.4	76.1
Source: Environment and Climate Change Canada

== Demographics ==
In the 2021 Census of Population conducted by Statistics Canada, Cap-Chat had a population of 2,516 living in 1,225 of its 1,405 total private dwellings, a change of 1.6% from its 2016 population of 2,476. With a land area of 181.31 km^{2} (70.00 sq mi), it had a population density of 13.9/km^{2} (35.9/sq mi) in 2021.

Canada census – Cap-Chat community profile

	2021	2016	2011
Population	2,516 (+1.6% from 2016)	2,476 (-5.6%% from 2011)	2,623 (-5.5%% from 2006)
Land area	181.31 km^{2} (70.00 sq mi)	182.05 km^{2} (70.29 sq mi)	181.89 km^{2} (70.23 sq mi)
Population density	13.9/km^{2} (36/sq mi)	13.6/km^{2} (35/sq mi)	14.4/km^{2} (37/sq mi)
Median age	58.8 (M: 58.8, F: 59.2)	57.0 (M: 56.5, F: 57.4)	53.7 (M: 53.1, F: 54.5)
Private dwellings	1,405 (total) 1,225 (occupied)	1,333 (total)	1,368 (total)
Median household income	$50,800	$44,971	$37,511

References: 2021 2016 2011

Historical Census Data - Cap-Chat, Quebec

Year	Pop.	±%
1971	3,868	—
1976	3,617	−6.5%
1981	3,464	−4.2%
1986	3,202	−7.6%
1991	2,926	−8.6%
1996	2,847	−2.7%

Year	Pop.	±%
2001	2,913	+2.3%
2006	2,777	−4.7%
2011	2,623	−5.5%
2016	2,476	−5.6%
2021	2,516	+1.6%

== Economy ==
Cap-Chat has become synonymous with wind energy. There is a wind farm there containing 76 wind generators in revenue service. Each one of these is a horizontal axis wind turbine (HAWT), but there is also to be seen there one called Éole, which is the world's tallest vertical axis wind turbine (VAWT) at 110 m. It is capable of producing 4 MW of power, but has not been in use for more than ten years following damages sustained during a wind storm. Everything that there is to know about wind power at Cap-Chat may be learnt at the interpretative centre at the wind farm.

Cap-Chat has other things that are worth seeing, such as the aforesaid cat-shaped headland, and a lighthouse.

Those interested in wilderness and spectacular scenery can explore the areas inland from Cap-Chat, where there was once a village called Saint-Octave-de-l'Avenir (which ironically means Saint Octavius of the Future, though it's long in the past now). Salmon fishing and moose hunting are other activities available in the Cap-Chat area, as are hiking, horseback riding, and off-road four-wheel drive excursions in the back country.

In winter, Cap-Chat has a downhill skiing centre, as well as trails for cross-country skiing, snowshoeing, and snowmobiling.

== Local government ==
List of former mayors:

- Claude Jourdain (1968–1973)
- Jacques Gagné (1973–1976)
- Joseph Francois Alphonse Gagnon (1976–1977, 1981–1985)
- Gérard Côté (1977–1979)
- Julien Lepage (1979–1981)
- J. Augustin St-Laurent (1985–1993)
- Jean Yves Bérubé (1993–1996)
- Georgette Pelletier (1996–2000)
- Judes Landry (2000–2017)
- Marie Gratton (2017–2021)
- Marcel Soucy (2021–present)

== Images ==
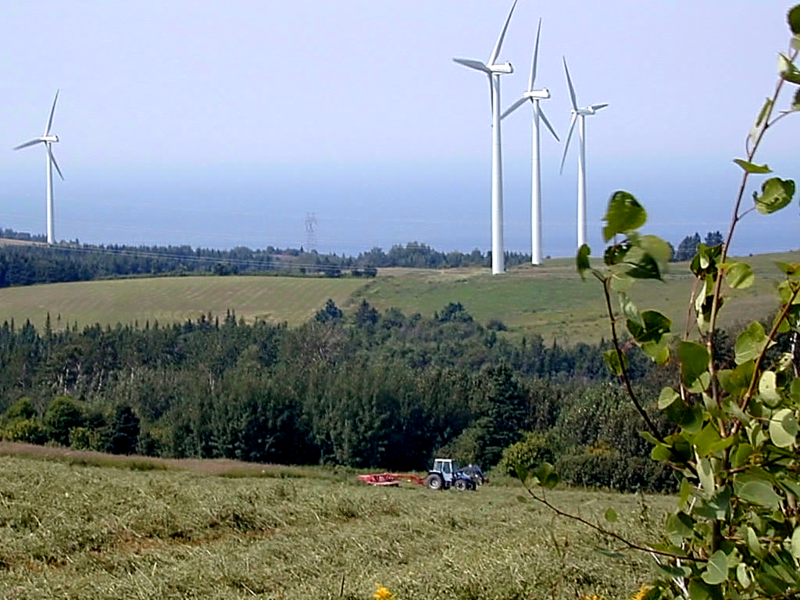
Wind turbines at Cap-Chat

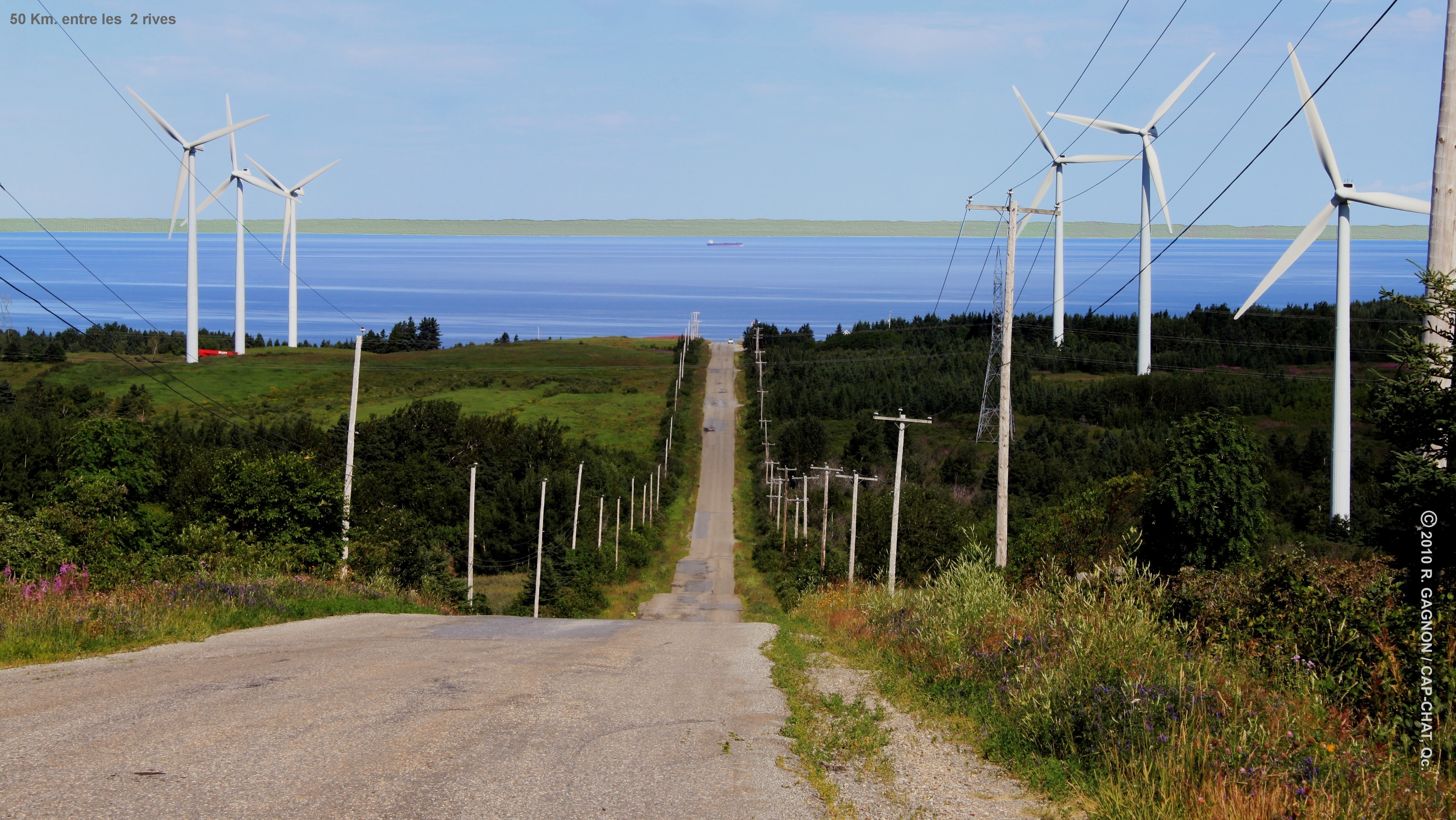
Wind farm

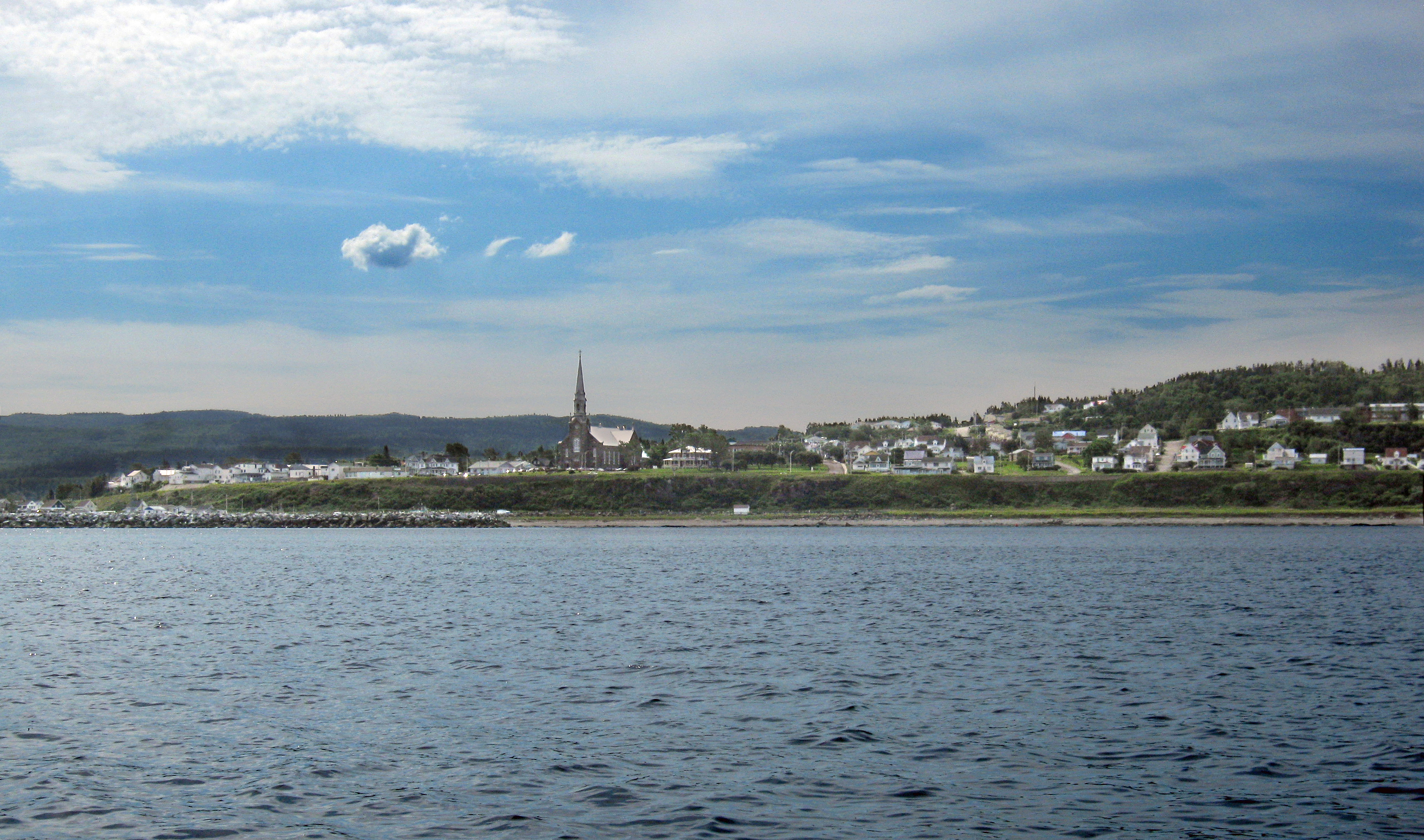
The village, as seen from the sea

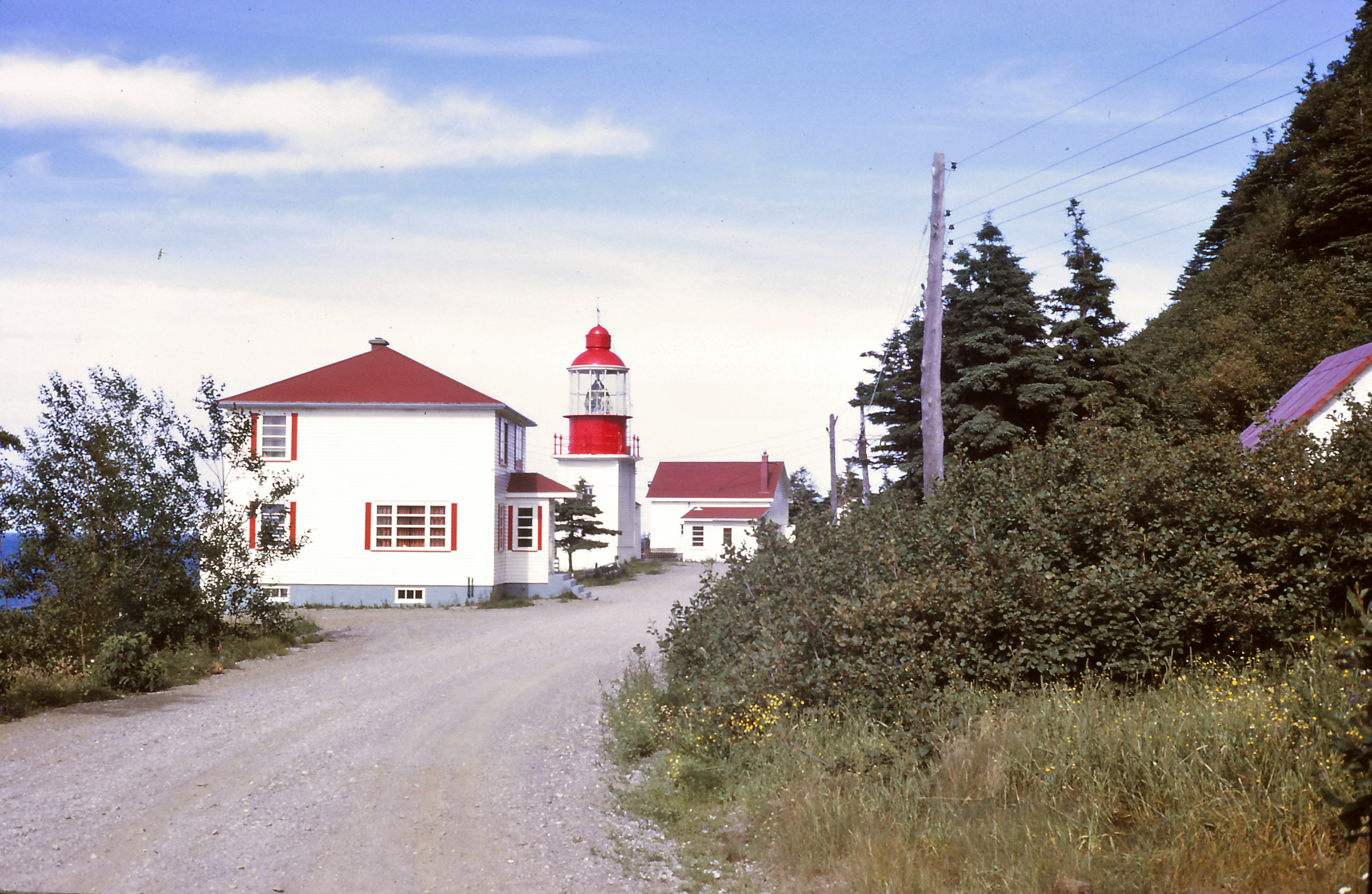
Lighthouse

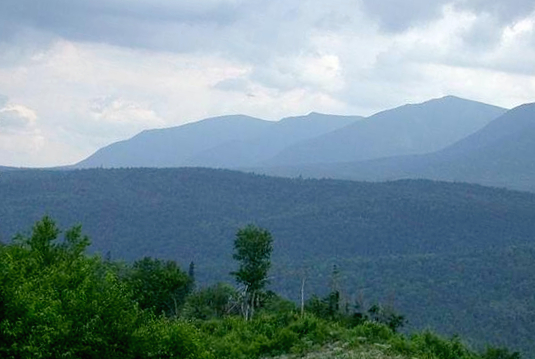
Backcountry

== See also ==
- List of cities in Quebec
