= Bas-Saint-Laurent =

- Administrative region
- Coordinates: 48°20′N 68°40′W
- Country: Canada
- Province: Quebec
- Regional County Municipalities (RCM) and Equivalent Territories (ET): 8 RCM: Kamouraska; La Matapédia; La Mitis; Les Basques; La Matanie; Rimouski-Neigette; Rivière-du-Loup; Témiscouata

Government
  - Table régionale des élus municipaux du Bas-Saint-Laurent (Regional conference of elected officers): Michel Lagacé (President)

Area
  - Land: 22,237.07 km^{2} (8,585.78 sq mi)

Population (2021)
  - Total: 199,039
  - Density: 9/km^{2} (23/sq mi)
- Time zone: UTC−05:00 (EST)
  - Summer (DST): UTC−04:00 (EDT)
- Postal code: G
- Area code: 418, 581
- Website: www.bas-saint-laurent.gouv.qc.ca

The Bas-Saint-Laurent (French pronunciation: [ba sɛ̃ lɔʁɑ̃], 'Lower Saint-Lawrence) is an administrative region of Quebec located along the south shore of the lower Saint Lawrence River in Quebec. The river widens at this place, later becoming a bay that discharges into the Atlantic Ocean and is often nicknamed "Bas-du-Fleuve" (Lower-River). The region is formed by eight regional county municipalities and 114 municipalities. In the south, it borders the US state of Maine, the Canadian province of New Brunswick and the Quebec administrative regions of Chaudière-Appalaches and Gaspésie–Îles-de-la-Madeleine.

It had a population of 199,039 and a land area of 22,188.19 km^{2} (8,566.91 sq mi) as of the 2021 census.

The territory has evidence of human occupation since the Pleistocene by successive indigenous peoples. The historic First Nations occupied it all until European colonisation started in the late 17th century; France made land concessions to settlers under the Seigneurial system of New France to encourage colonization. However, development of this region was slow until it started to exploit its mixed forests. Settlement gradually developed further inland, on the littoral, and since the late 20th century a leisure and recreation industry has developed.

Its geography is marked by the Saint Lawrence River to the northwest, the Notre Dame Mountains section of the Appalachians, as well as the Matapédia and Témiscouata valleys, which forms the natural communication corridors with the Gaspé Peninsula, the state of Maine in the United States, and the Maritimes.

== Etymology and toponymy ==
The region takes its name from the Saint Lawrence River, a waterway that has a central role in the history of Quebec and forms the northern border of the region. The name of the river, and by extension the region, has a hagiotoponymic origin originating from the baye sainct Laurens named by Jacques Cartier, originating from the date of discovery being 10 August 1535, day of the festival of Saint Lawrence in the Christian martyrology. The name of the bay was used again to describe the river when the Narration, his report of his expedition, was translated to Spanish and Italian, and definitively fixed by its use in the world map of cartographer Gerardus Mercator in 1569, according to historian Marcel Trudel.

The name "Bas-Saint-Laurent", however, only appeared much later. In their Histoire du Bas-Saint-Laurent, the historians Fortin and Lechasseur assert that the relation with the Saint Lawrence grew with the population of the region in the 19th century. The first mention of the name is attributed to a report from the Rimouskois deputy and writer Joseph-Charles Taché, which used the term to describe "the two shores of the Bas-Saint-Laurent except the Gaspé district". The authors, however, write that Taché preferred most of the time to use more precise and well-known references, like the counties of Montmorency and Rimouski. Even if the name of the region was present on a map made in 1863 by Stanislas Drapeau, it took time to settle in; the expression "le Bas du Fleuve" being preferred.

With the settlement of Témiscouata and la Matapédia, the name start imposing itself between 1920 and 1960, when a number of enterprises and organisms of the region delimitated by the Roman Catholic Archdiocese of Rimouski and Rivière-du-Loup, like the Compagnie de transport du Bas St-Laurent and the Compagnie de Pouvoir du Bas-Saint-Laurent or the newspaper l'Écho du Bas St-Laurent adopt it.

After being eclipsed for two decades when the State tried to erase regional differences by putting in place shared administrative structures east of the Quebec, the start of the 1980s sees this policy change, as the great region Bas-Saint-Laurent-Gaspésie is split into two different territories, being more accurate for the distinctive cultural traditions of these regions.

The evolution of the toponymy of the region takes root in the different steps of its development, with at first the initial settlement by First Nations. This was followed by a progressive settlement by French-speaking colonists starting in the very late 17th century, which was expanded on more in the 18th century. This was taken to an even greater extent in the 19th century. Additionally, there was a small Scottish presence starting in the 1800s, with activities centered on agriculture and the exploitation of its waters and forests. The last phase of this evolution took place when some inland communities started to decline and its centres of activity were reinforced.

== Geography ==
=== Situation and political divisions ===
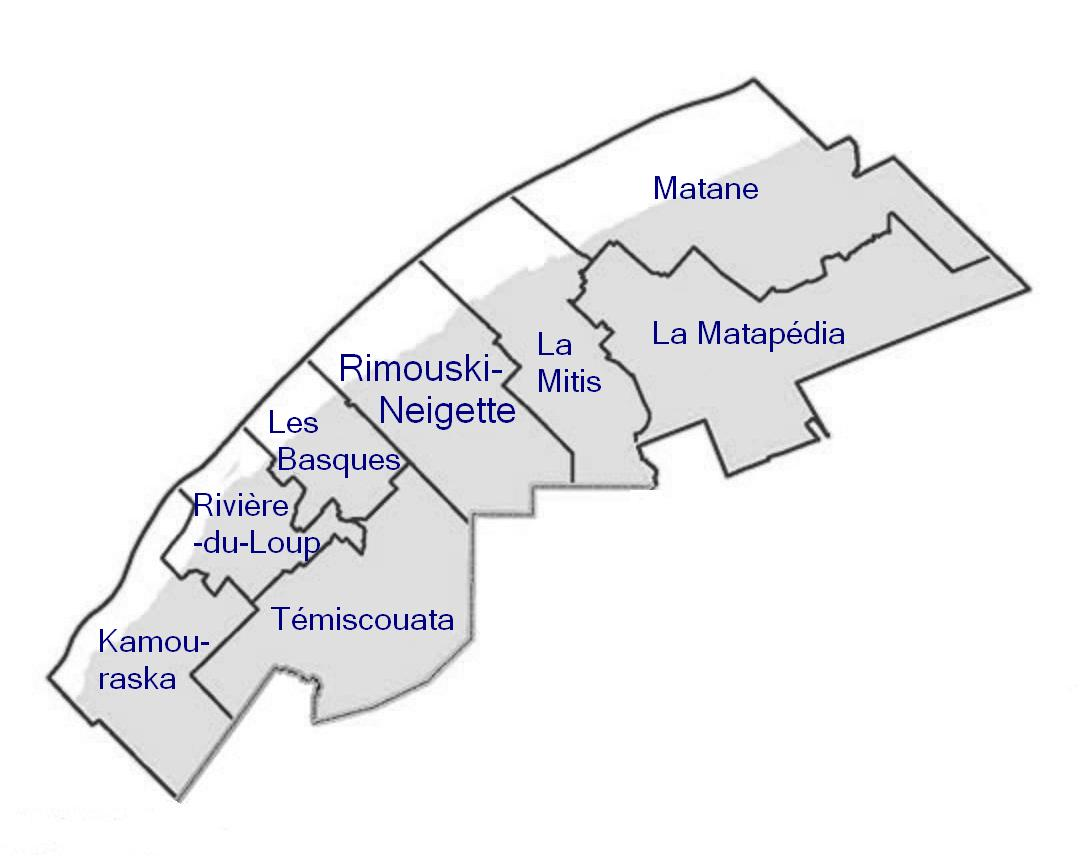
Map of Bas-Saint-Laurent with regional counties

The Bas-Saint-Laurent is a region in the East of Quebec, delimited to the north by the Saint Lawrence River, to the south by New-Brunswick and Maine, to the east by the Gaspé Peninsula and to the west by Côte-du-Sud. It extends over an area of 28,319 km^{2} (10,934 sq mi), with 22,141 km^{2} (8,549 sq mi) of land area, which represents a bit less than 2% of the total area of Quebec, however, this area also represents 10% of the inhabited area of Quebec, or about half the land area of Switzerland.

The region is divided into eight Regional county municipalities (RCM), which contain 130 municipalities. Bas Saint-Laurent contained 200,462 inhabitants in 2011, of which 55,400 were in its most populous RCM, Rimouski-Neigette. Otherwise, the least populous RCM of the region is Les Basques, with only 9,000 inhabitants in 2011, a number which decreased by 1,300 since 1996, making it also the RCM with the highest annual rate of population decrease of the region, with a rate of 9.6% between 2006 and 2011.

Forested areas and waterways dominate the land use of Bas-Saint-Laurent. The region counts 100,071 km^{2} (38,638 sq mi) of mixed forests, 4,918 km^{2} (1,899 sq mi) of coniferous forests and 6,177 km (3,838 mi) of waterways. Humid lands only covers 58 km^{2} (22 sq mi) and the land devoted to agriculture covers 2,819 km^{2} (1,088 sq mi), while developed areas represent only 143 km^{2} (55 sq mi), which equals to 0.5% of the total land area of the region.

=== Geology ===
Even if an isolated area of Cambrian and Precambrian rocks exist in an area of the Chic-Choc Mountains, the region belongs generally to the geologic province of the Appalachian Mountains, which covers an area of 3,000 km^{2} (1,200 sq mi), between Alabama and Newfoundland. The marks of two episodes of mountain-building, the Acadian orogeny and the Taconic orogeny, have shaped the land.

During the first orogeny, the Taconic, the subduction of the oceanic plate created a volcanic chain in the Iapetus Ocean, off the coast of Laurentia during the Cambrian period. The magma surfacing mixed with the sediments originating from the continental erosion and the volcanic arc of islands got gradually closer to the continent to the subduction. The two collided 450 million years ago and formed a chain of immature mountains, the Taconic Mountains, their nappe covers a part of the Saint Lawrence Lowlands.

This first zone, which follows the river today, is known as Humber's zone. Dating from the Ordovician, this bedrock is composed primarily of sedimentary rocks : sandstone, mudrocks and conglomerates. South of this zone, the Gaspé belt is the remnant of a second mountain formation during Siluro-Devonian times. Around 430 million years ago, the Taconic mountains eroded and created sediments that deposited at a shallow depth. As Laurentia and the micro-continent Avalonia deformed and raised the sedimentary deposits and volcanic rocks and created a second chain of mountains, the Acadian Chain, which superposes itself on the Taconic Chain.

=== Seismicity ===
The estuary of the St. Lawrence River in front of the Charlevoix region is one of the most active seismic regions in the east of Canada. Five earthquakes of a magnitude superior to 6 have occurred in history, in February 1663, December 1791, October 1860, October 1870 and February 1925. The distribution of these earthquakes indicates a concentration in the estuary, near La Malbaie and Rivière-du-Loup.

Surveys and the establishment of a seismometer network were conducted in the 1970s and allowed to circumscribe the seismically active area in an area of 30 km (19 mi) on 85 km (53 mi) along the Saint Lawrence River, this zone includes the towns of La Malbaie, Baie-Saint-Paul and La Pocatière. The seismic data indicates that an earthquake happens on average every 36 hours in the Charlevoix-Kamouraska zone. They are concentrated in the Precambrian bedrock under the Logan line and the Appalachian Mountains, at a variable depth between 30 km (19 mi) deep and the surface

Another seismic area located in the Gulf of Saint Lawrence, in a triangle between the towns of Matane, Baie-Comeau and Sept-Îles. However, this seismic area is less active than the one uphill, as only an average of sixty earthquakes occur each year and has not had a destructive earthquake in history. An earthquake of magnitude 5.1 occurred in 1944 east of Godbout and another of the same magnitude occurred on the 16 March 1999, its epicentre was located at about 60 km (37 mi) south of Sept-Îles.

=== Topography ===
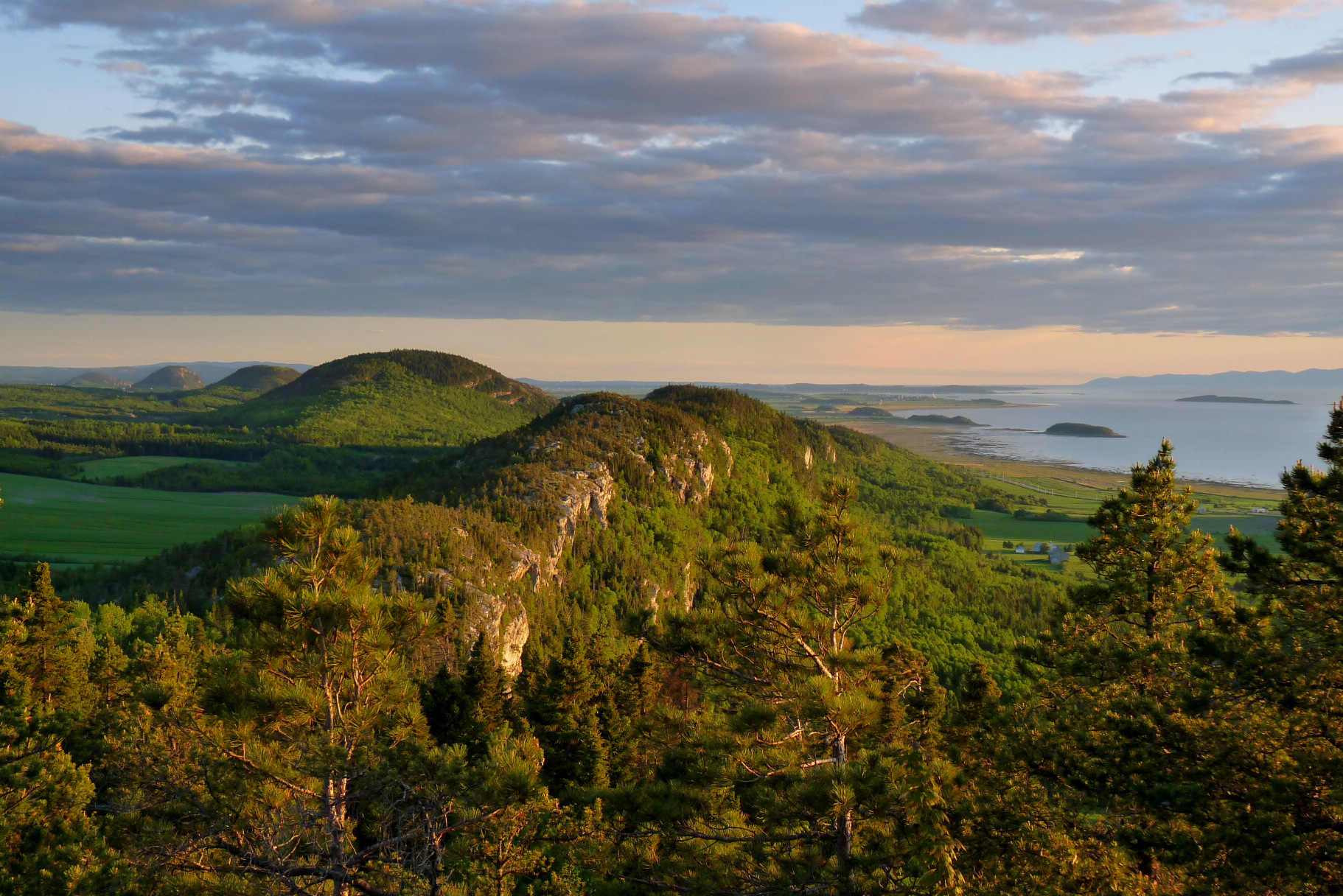
Inselbergs in Saint-André-de-Kamouraska

The topography of Bas-Saint-Laurent has two main elements : the plateaus of the Appalachian Mountains, called Notre Dame Mountains, and the lowlands in the fine stripe of land along the St. Lawrence River. These are separated by an intermediate area of ridges and foothills which meld with the plateaus. The Notre Dame Mountains, are a group of small mountains with summits reaching between 600 and 700 m (2,000 and 2,300 ft) high. the landscape is sometimes interrupted by valleys, like the Témiscouata valley or Matapedia Valley. These two parallel valleys allow access to The Maritimes, Maine and Chaleur Bay.

The littoral, spanning across 320 km (200 mi) is composed of riverside land of altitudes ranging from 0 to 250 m (0 to 820 ft) above sea level. This area has a depth of 5 km (3.1 mi) before reaching the mountains in the west of the region, but reaches 25 km (16 mi) in the vicinity of Rimouski, only to shrink again in the eastern limits of the region. This riverside land disappears entirely between the municipalities of Sainte-Félicité and Grosses-Roches. In the western part of the territory, this littoral plain is interrupted by inselbergs, ridges reaching that can reach 200m in height, typical of the riverside land of Bas-Saint-Laurent

In the Quaternary, the region was marked by glaciation. the Wisconsin glaciation caused the crust to sink by 200 m (660 ft) in the vicinity of Rimouski. When the end of the glaciation started in 18,000 BP, it opened a sound in the Saint-Laurent valley, isolating the glacier covering Bas-Saint-Laurent from the one covering Côte-Nord. The isostatic rebound created an inland sea, the Sea of Goldthwait, which flooded the region under at most 200m of water in the area around Rimouski.

The withdrawal of the Sea of Goldthwait was gradual, 2,000 years ago the isostatic rebound stabilised at around 1 mm (0.039 in) per year, the withdrawal of the water formed a number of narrow streaks of emerged land near the riverside between Rivière-du-Loup and Rimouski, known today as Île aux Lièvres, Île Verte, île aux Basques, île du Bic and île Saint-Barnabé.

=== Hydrography ===
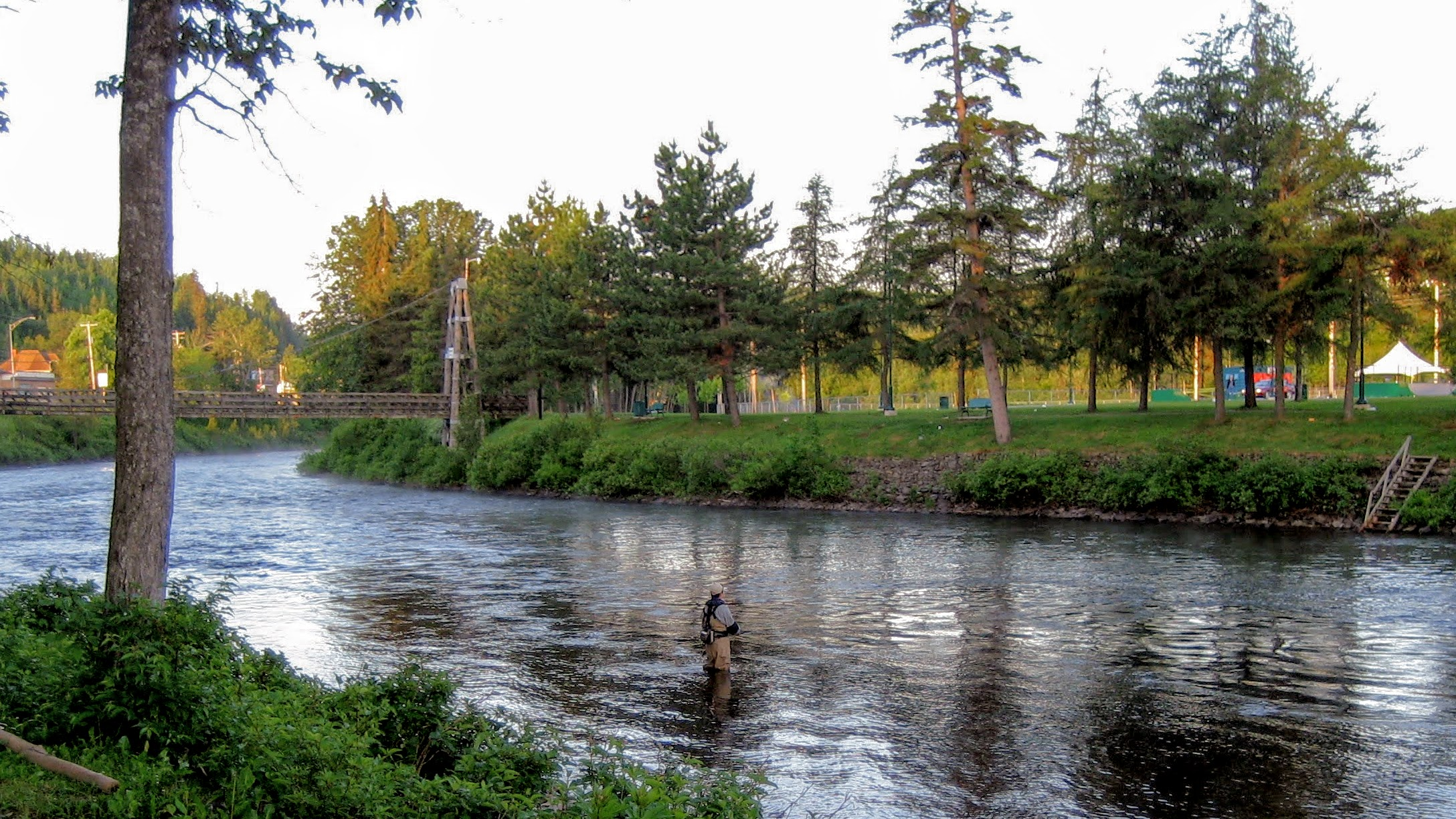
Matapédia River in Causapscal

The estuary of the St. Lawrence River, to the north of the region, plays a primary role in the region. It is divided in two regions split at Cacouna: west of Cacouna, it is called a medium estuary, while east of the municipality it is called a maritime estuary or lower estuary.

The region is relatively poor in fresh water, since lakes and rivers only count as 1.5% of the land area. It possesses two hydrographic regions, the first holds all the streams that pour into the estuary of the Saint-Lawrence river and the region of Chaleur Bay and Percé, whose streams flow south into New-Brunswick and Maine. These regions influenced the layout of the administrative areas of Bas-Saint-Laurent, by setting limits to some regional county municipalities.

The largest drainage basins of the region are located in the south of the territory. These are the drainage basins of the Matapedia River (3,328 km^{2} [1,285 sq mi]) and Madawaska River (2,861 km^{2} [1,105 sq mi]). Ranking third, the drainage basin of the Cascapédia River of 1,701 km^{2} (657 sq mi), half of this basin is located within the limits of the administrative region. Among the notable rivers pouring into the Saint-Lawrence, we can count the Mitis River (1,812 km^{2} [700 sq mi]), Matane River (1,692 km^{2} [653 sq mi]), Rimouski River (1,621 km^{2} [626 sq mi]), Rivière du Loup (1,046 km^{2} [404 sq mi]) and Trois Pistoles River (966 km^{2} [373 sq mi]).

Bas-Saint-Laurent counts 2,417 lakes, of which 90% do not exceed an area of 20 ha (49 acres). About 30% of them are situated in the RCM of Rimouski-Neigette. The two largest lakes of the region are Lake Témiscouata (66.82 km^{2} (25.80 sq mi)) and Lake Matapedia (38.07 km^{2} [14.70 sq mi]), significant human settlement on their shore has taken place, as well as along the roads going through their valleys. These lakes also distinguish themselves by their north west and south west orientation, compared to most of the other lakes of the region which prefer to follow the orientation of the creases and breaks of the Appalachian Mountains.

=== Climate ===
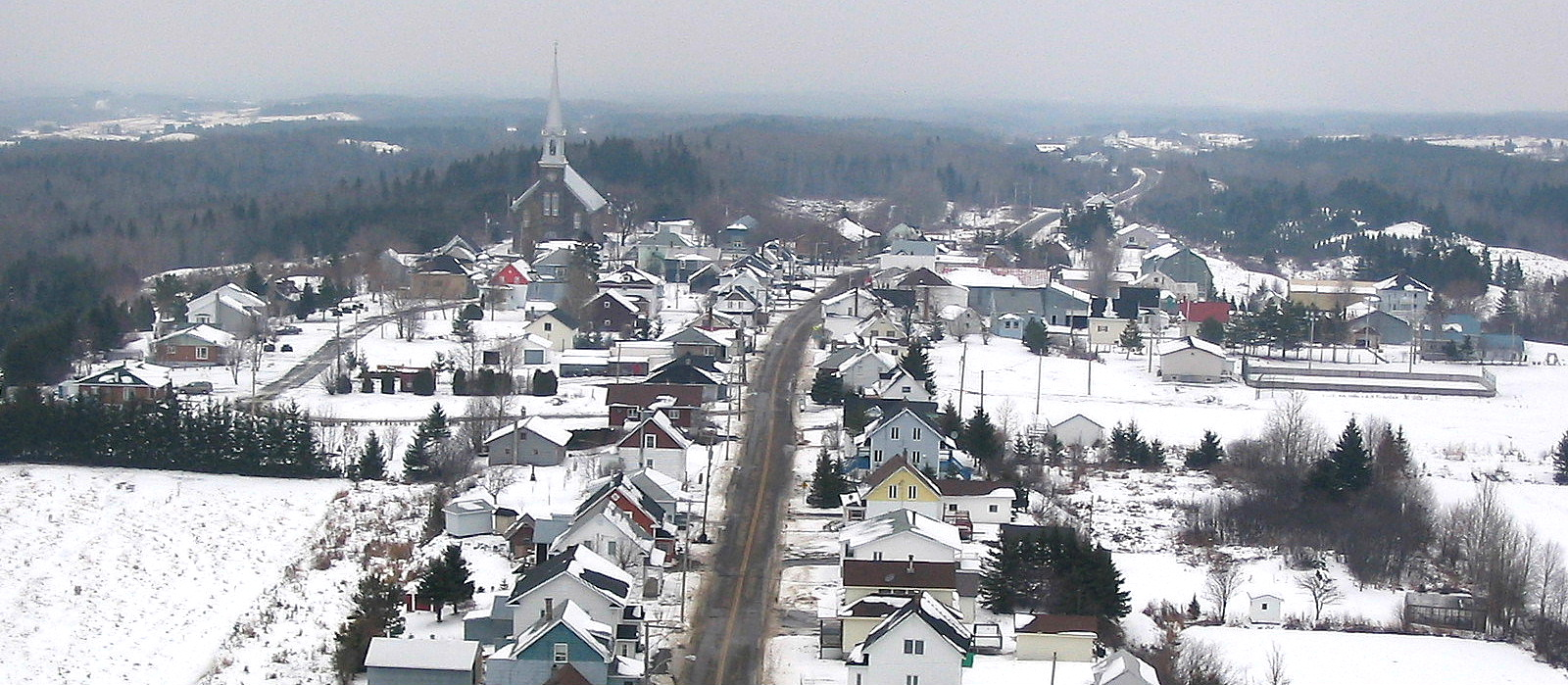
Winter in Saint-Paul-de-la-Croix

Bas-Saint-Laurent, like the rest of Quebec, is a Nordic American territory. The Quebecois geographer Louis-Edmond Hamelin categorized the region in his pre-north area, second of the five zones of his map of nordicity zones.

The oceanic influence of the estuary of the Saint Lawrence River has a small influence on the climate of the region, making it more alike to the climate of meridional Quebec, than with "Nordic" towns like La Sarre in Abitibi or Roberval, Quebec in Saguenay-Lac-Saint-Jean, located at the same latitude than the town of Matane. However, the climate of Bas-Saint-Laurent is of continental type, with a "great amplitude and no dry periods".

The French geographer Raoul Blanchard described the temperature variations between winter and summer as "brutal". During the winter, which lasts for five months, the cold freezes the lakes and rivers and transforms the estuary into a "vast prairie of ice".

The oceanic influence, while it mitigates the cold of the winters, cools the summers. The average temperature in July in Rimouski inferior by 4 degrees to the one recorded in Quebec. To this, the wind of the north west adds humidity and cold.

Rainfall is abundant and consistent throughout the year. The region currently receives annually 800 to 1,200 mm (31 to 47 in) of rainfall, of which between 250 and 360 cm (98 and 142 in) is snow. The oceanic influence is less present inland, where slightly warmer temperatures in the summer and slightly colder in the winter are recorded.

== Natural environment ==
=== Flora ===
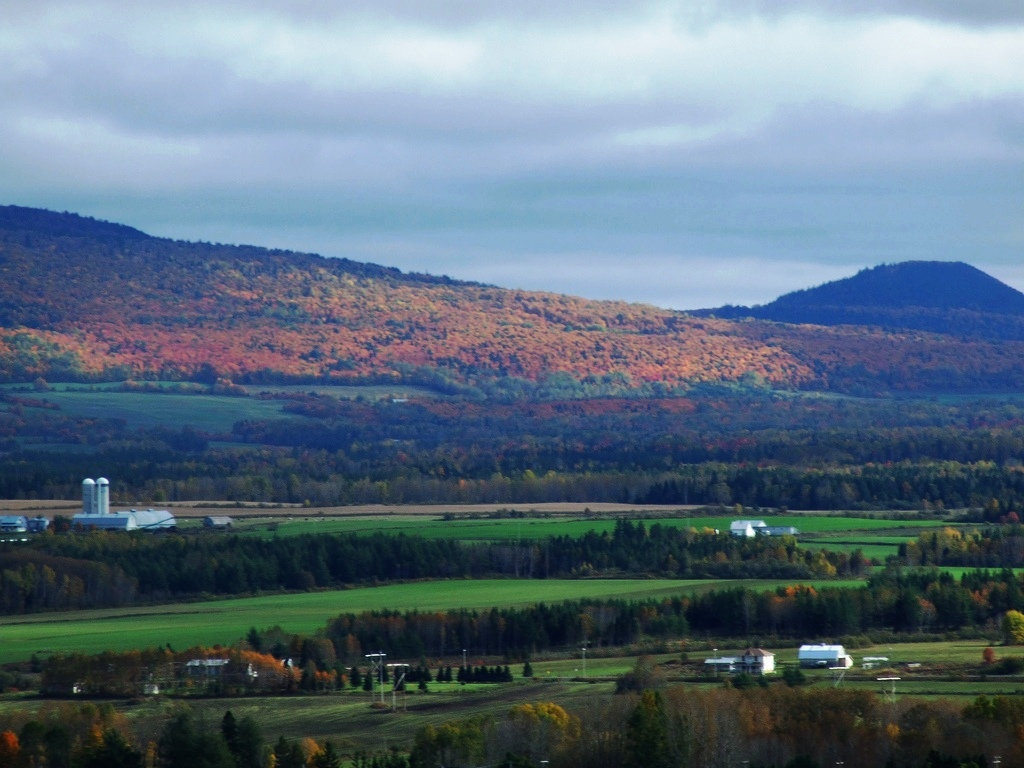
Chic-Choc Mountains in Sayabec

Bas-Saint-Laurent is part of the natural province of the Appalachian Mountains in the ecological reference area of Quebec. The forests of Bas-Saint-Laurent are 8,000 years old. Beyond inhabited areas, they cover the majority of the territory. They are boreal with a coniferous influence. The forests most important in order of superficy are those of golden birch, paper birch and white spruce.

The dominant forest of the territory is composed of golden birch trees, an Ecotone marking the transition between the temperate nordique area and the boreal area. It is located mainly in the highest part of the Appalachian plateau. The main species of trees within it are the paper birch, the balsam fir, and the white spruce, as well as rarer quaking aspens and jack pines. The second forest in superficy is composed of primarily golden birch, and covers 35% of the forested area of the region. It is mainly located in the centre of Bas-Saint-Laurent between Rivière-du-Loup and Rimouski. The main species of trees within it are the golden birch, balsam fir, white spruce, red spruce and the cedar, as well as rarer quaking aspens, paper birches, balsam poplars and mountain maple.

However, a more profound analysis of the composition of the forests of Bas-Saint-Laurent allows to shed light on which trees grow at which elevations, type of soils and latitudes. Miroslav Grandtner categorized the south west end of the region, the littoral stripe before Rivère-du-Loup and the medium plateau in the golden birch forest, the high plateau as part of the paper birch forest, and finally, the Chic-Choc Mountains as part of the white spruce forest.

=== Fauna ===
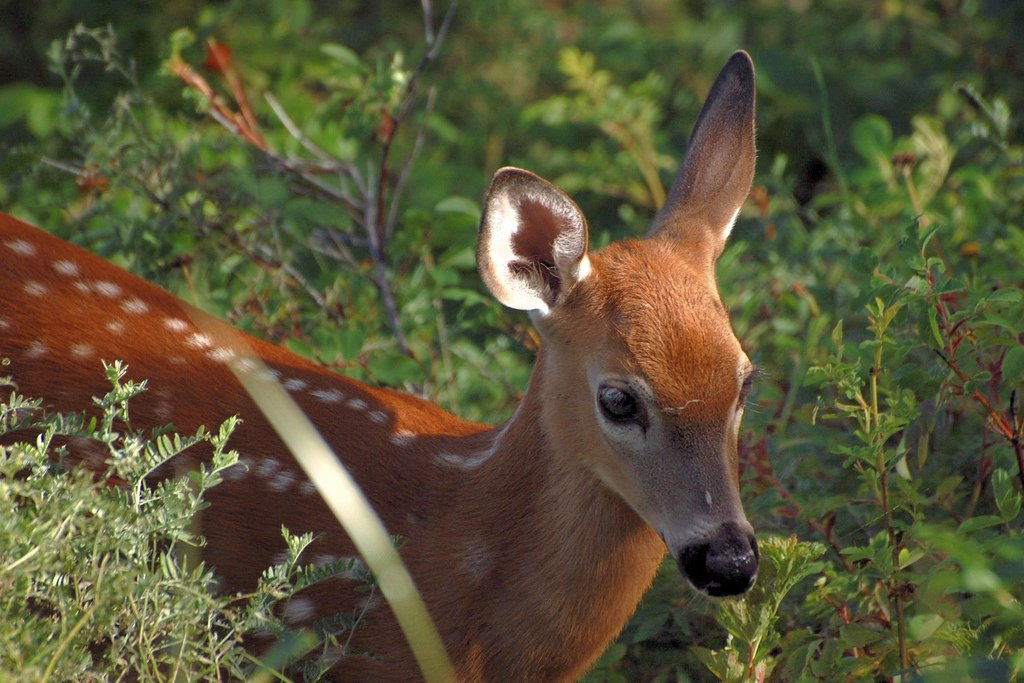
White-tailed deer fawn in Bic National Park

The fauna of Bas-Saint-Laurent is similar to the one found in other parts of Quebec and has a relatively poor diversity in species. The glacial episodes of the Pleistocene drove away the animals of the ice-covered area and these came back gradually as the ice sheet melted over the last 18,000 years.

The melting of the ice sheet and the flood of the sea of Goldthwait around the current estuary brought molluscs like true mussels, soft-shell clams and scallops. Belugas and other whales visit it. According to the remains of marine mammals found in altitude further inland, narvals, walruses and earless seals were also present in the region.

On land, the eider appears around 18,000 BP and a mastodon closely related to the mammoth inhabited the area before disappearing 8000 years ago. Today, the region is dominated by the big game moose, white-tailed deer and black bear. The small game is composed of the ruffed grouse, the spruce grouse and snowshoe hare. The muskrat, North American beaver and red fox are also usual sights in the forests of Bas-Saint-Laurent.

Many species of birds live along the estuary of Saint Lawrence. The Canada goose, snow goose and brant do a halt in the tidal marshes located along the litoral between La Pocatière and Pointe-au-Père. Diverse types of duck are present, like the American black duck, Northern pintail, two types of surface duck. Diving ducks are represented by the common goldeneye and ring-necked duck, while sea ducks are represented by the common eider and long-tailed duck.

=== Environmental protection ===
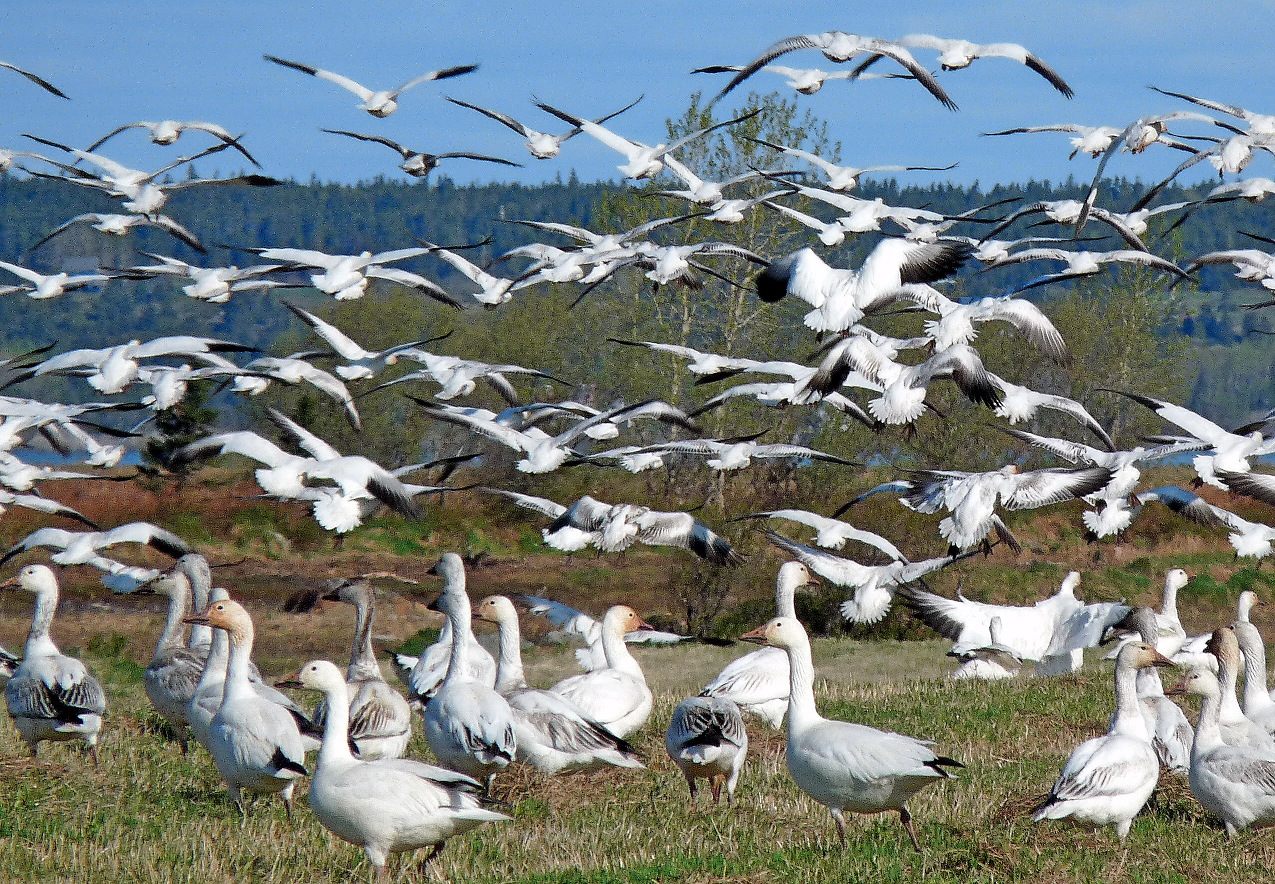
White geese in Baie de l'Isle-Verte

Bas-Saint-Laurent has only one wetland area according to the Ramsar Convention, the Baie de l'Isle-Verte, part of it is protected by the national wildlife reserve of baie de L'Isle-Verte. This swamp is primarily occupied by cordgrasses and is an important nesting area for the American black duck, as well as a stop for migratory birds in spring.

The region has four national parks. The Lac-Témiscouata National Park is located east of the Lake Témiscouata and protects a representative part of the Notre Dame Mountains and several ancient forests. The Bic National Park, near Rimouski, protects the litoral of the south of the estuary of Saint Lawrence. The Gaspésie National Park, of which only a small part is within the limits of the region, is characterized by several summits taller than 1,000 m (3,300 ft). Its diverse climate and its landscape host a flora unique in Quebec. Finally, about 30% of the Saguenay–St. Lawrence Marine Park, the first marine park of Quebec, is located in the region. It holds the longest fjord in the east of Canada as well as a part of the largest estuary in the world, which makes it a location of considerable marine biodiversity. It is the only park administered in Canada by both the Government of Quebec and Government of Canada.

Three other parks, ecological reserves, more restricted protected areas, are located in the centre of the region, the reserves of Fernald, Charles-B.-Banville and Irène-Fournier. At the same level of protection, there are six floristic parks, most of them within the Gaspésie National Park.

The largest protected areas of the region are those protected by the confinement areas of the white-tailed deer. Just these protected areas cover nearly 80% of the protected area of the region. Bas-Saint-Laurent contains about 27% of the protected areas of this designation. The second largest designation by superficy are the protected areas devoted to the protection of aquatic birds, of which a large part (507 km^{2} [196 sq mi]) are in a marine environment.

Although they are not strictly considered protected areas, the territories structured for the gestion of wildlife cover 45,5% of the surface area of the region. They are divided in four wildlife reserves and five Zone d'exploitation contrôlée.

== Demography ==
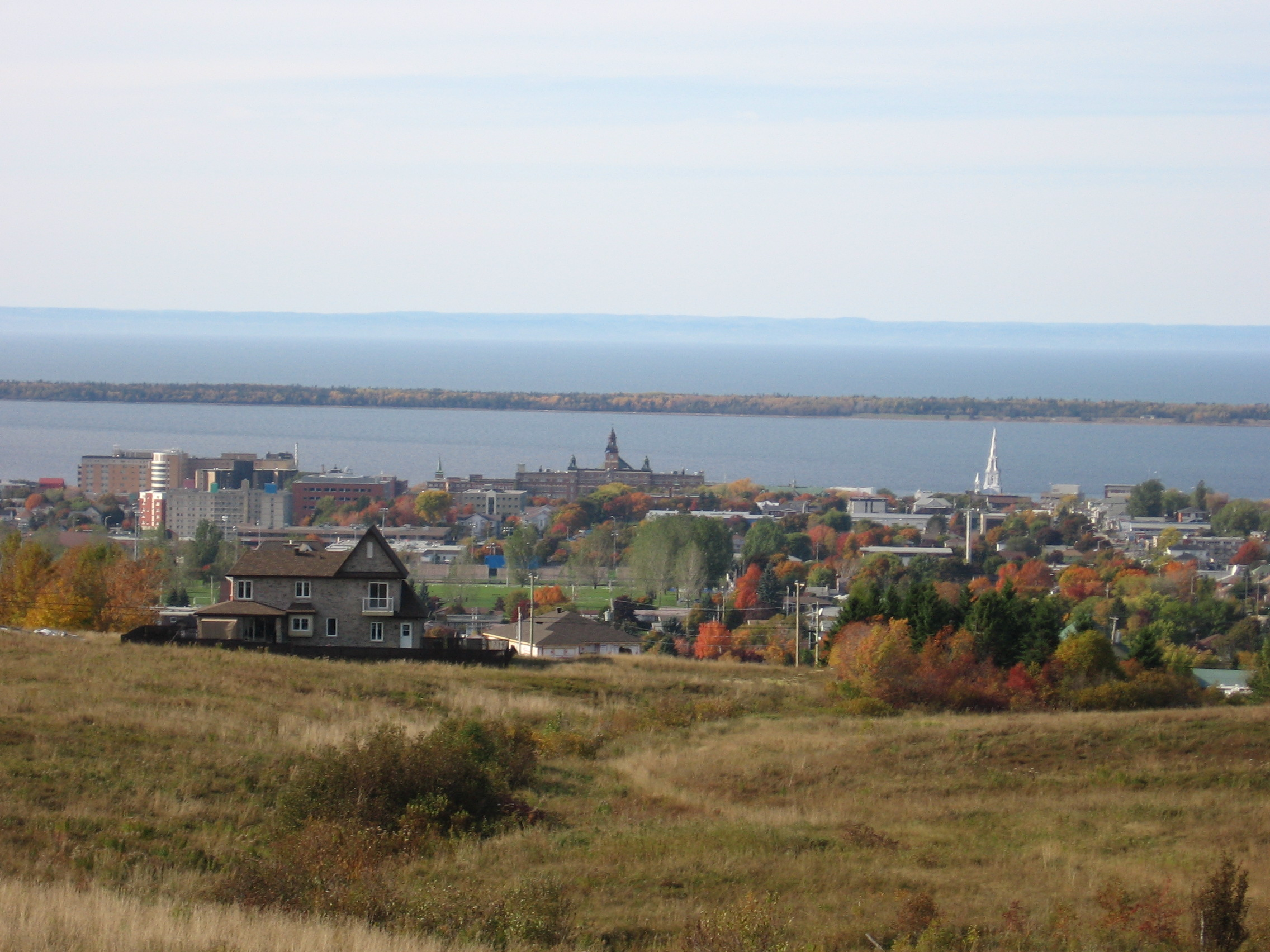
Rimouski, the largest city in Bas-Saint-Laurent

After reaching its peak in the middle of the 20th century due to the strong natality and a reduction of child mortality, the population of Bas-Saint-Laurent has declined over the last 50 years. This is not unique to the region, as the population living on the south shore of the estuary, in the regions of Côte-du-Sud, Bas-Saint-Laurent and Gaspésie, proportionally declined from 9.3 to 5.4% of the total population of Quebec between 1951 and 1991. This decline is due to structural issues like the rationalization of agriculture and the depletion of the forests, but also to rural flight and a declining birth rate since the 1960s.

=== Population ===
Bas-Saint-Laurent was home to 200,500 inhabitants on the first of July 2011, which represents 2.5% of the total population of Quebec. This number indicates that this share has dropped by 4% since 1996. More than 40% of the population of the region lives in two RCMs, Rimouski-Neigette (55,364 inhabitants in 2011) and Rivière-du-Loup (34,326 inhabitants in 2011).

Since 1951, the region has seen its population stagnate or slightly decline. This is due to two opposing factors, the decline of rural areas and the reinforcement of urban areas, like Rimouski and Rivière-du-Loup. The share of these two towns alone went from 16% of the total population of the region in 1951 to 34% in 2001. The new importance of these urban centres explain the fact that only their RCMs have had a population increase between 1951 and 2001. Opposite to these, RCMs devoid of a strong urban centre, like La Matapédia, Témiscouata and Les Basques, have been the RCMs where the population has dropped the most in the region.

Accounting for the population decrease observed since 1951, even when Quebec's population has increased by 82%, it is not surprising that the share of the population of Quebec living in Bas-Saint-Laurent has decreased from 5.2% in 1951 to 2.8% in 2001.

=== Age ===
The population of Bas-Saint-Laurent is significantly older than the population of Quebec as a whole. In 2011, the average age of the population of Bas-Saint-Laurent was 47.3 years, making it the second oldest region of Quebec by that criterion, behind neighbouring Gaspésie–Îles-de-la-Madeleine (49.0 years) and just before the region in third place, Mauricie (47.2).

The share of youths under the age of 20 is also one of the lowest of Quebec, at 19.5%, compared to the average of 21.7%.

As is the case for data on population, the data on the age of said population shows a clear divide between the two urban RCMs and the rural ones. The RCM Les Basques sees an important aging of its population and has the lowest share of youths between 0 and 19 years old (17.5), the population over 65 years old has the largest share (25.6%), and the average age of 51 years is the highest of the region in 2011.

=== Language ===
Nearly all residents of Bas-Saint-Laurent speak French as their mother tongue. According to the 2006, 98.6% of those who responded declared their native tongue to be French, 0.6% declared English, and 0.8% listed a different language. Only 315 people indicated both French and English to be their native tongues, and 86 people cited French and another language.

The proportion of Bas-Saint-Laurent residents reporting they can speak both French and English was 15.6%, compared to 40.6% in all of Quebec. This share was greater in the two largest cities of the region, reaching 21.7% in Rimouski and 18.0% in Rivière-du-Loup. Among smaller towns, Notre-Dame-du-Lac stood out with a bilingual rate of 20.3%. In the region, 140 people reported they only spoke English, and 125 others reported that they could not speak either French or English.

=== Immigration ===
The regional conference of elected representatives considers immigration to be a major issue for the economic and social development of Bas-Saint-Laurent and expends great efforts to attract new inhabitants, it also creates programs of insertion and promotion for them. Bas-Saint-Laurent welcomed 585 immigrants between 2001 and 2006, which is about 30% of the 2000 inhabitants who migrated there according to the 2006 census. The RCM of Rimouski-Neigette welcomed more than half (310) of the new arrivals in the region between 2001 and 2006

These numbers must however be put in relation to the fact that 77.3% of the 236,975 immigrants to settle in Quebec between 1998 and 2007 chose the metropolitan region of Montréal, Bas-Saint-Laurent received only 0.2% of the immigrants that came to Quebec during this period.

=== Demographic projection ===
According to the most recent demographic projection from the Institut de la statistique du Québec, the population of Bas-Saint-Laurent will register a slight decline to 198,600 in 2031. According to this prediction, the proportion of inhabitants above 65 years old should reach 36% and will be twice as large as the share of inhabitants between 0 and 19 years old. This demographic prediction settles that the average age of the population of Bas-Saint-Laurent would reach 53 years, an increase of 6% compared to the latest data. The positive net migration rate will be insufficient in countering the negative rate of natural increase of the population.

== History ==
=== Prehistory and proto-history ===
The first inhabitants of the area that is now known as Bas-Saint-Laurent lived on the shore of the estuary soon after the glaciers melted Archeological excavations between 1980 and 1990 around Bic and Rimouski indicate an amerindian presence during the Paleoindian, between 9,000 and 8,000 BP years, according to Pierre Dumais and Gilles Rousseau. and between 10,000 and 8,000 BP years according to Claude Chapdelaine.

Paleoindian sites discovered on an ancient beach 80 m (260 ft) above and a sea shelf contained stone tools and lithic flakes, indicating an industry belonging to the Plano culture. These nomads inhabited the region and practiced a hunter-gatherer lifestyle.

A second period, the Archaic covers about 5,000 years and starts at around 7,000 BP to end 2,500 years ago in the south of Quebec. In 1977, researchers listed 19 sites in the region; six near the estuary and thirteen inland. The Archaic Period is characterised by nomad populations using various methods to use more efficiently the resources of the land. The sites are often located near small lakes or along rivers like the Touladi River in the Témiscouata. The artifacts discovered seem to indicate these groups preferred hunting rather than fishing.

Four sites are located in the Bic National Park. The most ancient, dated at around 4,000 years old, is located on the east shore of the Orignal's Cape. It is an old abandoned marine shelf abandoned 1,000 years ago by the Sea of Goldthwait. Aside from tools and lithic flakes, archeologists also found broken and heated stones, sign that the inhabitants created hearths with which they cooked food and maybe smoked the meat.

=== Basque people ===
Just like the Normands and the Bretons, Basque fishermen started exploiting the marine ressources of the estuary and gulf of the Saint Lawrence in the 16th century. Their presence is confirmed as early as the 1520s and becomes more frequent right after the expeditions of Jacques Cartier.

Around 1560, the Basque own a fleet of a hundred cod-fishers and thirty whalers. They first exploit the abundant ressources present in the estuary and the banks of Newfoundland, but around 1570, it seems the reduced numbers of whale colonies push them to search for them all the way to the medium estuary of the Saint Lawrence.

The hunt is mainly located at the level of the chasse Saguenay fjord. L'île aux Basques, located in front of Trois-Pistoles, on the south shore of the Saint Lawrence River, it becomes a place for the Basque to skin the whales captured in the area and melt their fat. Three furnaces still stand to remind us of this activity.

=== Slow colonization of the littoral ===
Even if under French rule, more than twenty segnories were granted along the bank of the river, all the way to Métis, and even inland (the segnories of Madawaska, Lac-Mitis and Lac-Matapédia), the settlement of Bas-Saint-Laurent remains sparse until 1790. With the exception of Kamouraska, which had a quicker colonization, in the prolongation of Côte-du-Sud and the royal path, Bas-Saint-Laurent remains isolated. When conquered, around 1760, the population east of Kamouraska is composed of a couple dozen families of pioneers and is concentrated in four seignories : Rivière-du-Loup, Isle-Verte, Trois-Pistoles and Rimouski. In 1790, Bas-Saint-Laurent, with the exception of Kamouraska, is home to barely 1250 inhabitants spread across hundreds of kilometers of shore, between Notre-Dame-du-Portage and Matane.

The construction of the Chemin du Portage around 1783 which allowed to link the valley of the Saint-Laurent with the British colonies of the Maritimes, which makes the area less isolated, but doesn't induce any permanent settlement alongside its path.

Between 1790 and 1831, the population of Bas-Saint-Laurent in the old county of Rimouski (east of Kamouraska) goes from 1,000 to 10,000 inhabitants. The population of the county of Kamouraska nearly triples by changing from 5,500 to 15,000 inhabitants. This increase in population is due to both a strong natural growth and migration from more western regions. This settlement allows a nearly continuous exploitation of the Ribbon farms on the banks of the river in some places and the establishment of the first farms inland. Around Cacouna, in 1831, the settlement has already progressed enough to reach the fourth layer of farms. It is also around this time that the isolation is broken: in 1830, one can go to Rimouski by the royal path.

The years which follow the conquest are full of hardship for the catholic clergy. Even if the population justify it, the bishop struggles to make the British authorities recognize the new parishes. The first parish of Bas-Saint-Laurent east of Kamouraska is Cacouna, created in 1825, a century and a half after the arrival of the first un siècle et demi après l'arrivée des premiers pioneers. Even if a number of families of Scottish origin settle in the area in the 1820s in the region of, following John MacNider, however the French-speaking population will remain the strong majority of the region.

=== End of isolation ===
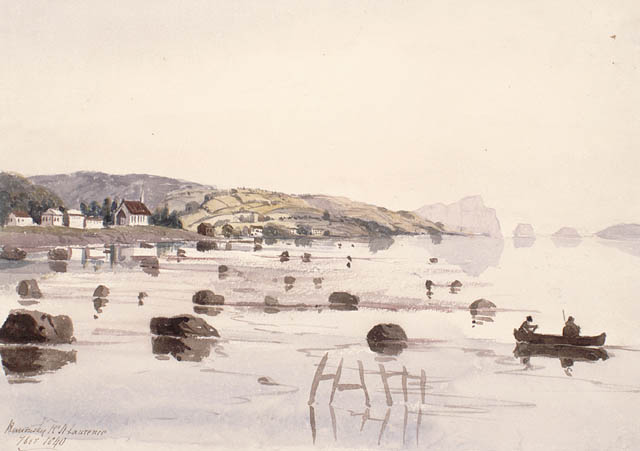
Mouth of Rimouski River and the village in 1840

The region's population increased from 400 inhabitants in 1829 to 11,169 in 1881. Three factors explain this rise. First, the development of agriculture in the lowlands is booming. Second, entrepreneurs like William Price establish sawmills which creates opportunities of employment for factory and forest workers, favorable trade with the United Kingdom and the United States allows this industry to profit with their exports finally, Rimouski turns into a regional centre of services with the establishment of a courthouse in 1862, the creation of the diocese of Rimouski in 1867 and the opening of a seminar in 1871.

The development of transportation, in particular the service assured by the Intercolonial Railway since 1873, creates a boom in trade and pushes agriculture to specialize in dairy production. Taking advantage of the large supply of lumber inland, the enterprise Price Brothers and Company builds a large sawmill at the mouth of the Rimouski River in 1899. The Great Depression of the 1930s reduces lumber demand and forces part of the population to migrate further inland; the colonization period between 1880 and 1930 sees a number of failures leading to the closure of a number of plusieurs échecs menant à la fermeture de parishes due to the exodus of their inhabitants. with the creation of the colonies of Esprit-Saint, de La Trinité-des-Monts et de Saint-Eugène-de-Ladrière, the inhabited area reaches its maximum.

In May 1950, a fire in the sawmill of the Price Brothers spreads over large parts of Rimouski and forces the region to re-allocate its resources towards services. The development of the mining, forestry and hydroelectric industries in Côte-Nord allows entrepreneurs like Jules-A. Brillant to develop a bustling business in the sectors of communication, transportation, wholesale and construction. With renewed involvement of the state after the Quiet Revolution, Rimouski affirms itself as the capital of the region and its service center. This change in the regional economy will negatively impact the hinterland, whose population reinforces Rimouski and the neighboring towns, like Saint-Anaclet-de-Lessard and the old municipalities of Le Bic, Rimouski-Est and Pointe-au-Père.

=== Contemporary period ===
In reaction to this rural flight, the federal and provincial governments establish in the 1960s, a test program of spatial planning in the regions of Gaspésie and Bas-Saint-Laurent. The Bureau d'aménagement de l'Est du Québec (BAEQ) is created in 1963 and the planners work for three years on a plan to raise the quality of life of the population by notably improving the mobility and formation of the workforce. The second part of the plan is the closure of villages in the hinterland of Bas-Saint-Laurent and the relocation of thousands inhabitants.

A movement of protest, the Opérations Dignité, are organized between 1970 and 1972 in the communities affected by the plan by the priests of their respective parishes. The first of these operations takes place in the hinterland of Matane and in the Matapédia Valley, followed by a second in the hinterland of Rimouski and in Témiscouata and a third in the east end of Gaspésie. In response to these protests the governments reconsiders the plan and cancels the closure of these villages.

In the early 1980s, the government of Quebec decentralizes its spatial planning and grants to the regions a part of the responsibility in the management policies of their territory. The old county councils created after the abolition of the seigniorial system, in 1855, are turned into regional county municipalities (RCM) in 1982 and are granted the responsabilité of the spatial planning of the territory.

Noting the failure of a forced merger of the two regions in the 1960s, the administrative region of Bas-Saint-Laurent-Gaspésie-Îles-de-la-Madeleine is divided by the government in December 1987. The new administrative region of Bas-Saint-Laurent keeps roughly the eastern border that was created in 1788 during the first carving of the territory for administrative purposes. In this new region, the RCM of Kamouraska becomes the eighth RCM of the region.

In 2012, the region contains 130 municipalities of which 114 belong to the administrative class of local municipalities grouped in eight RCM. the number of municipalities has been in a constant drop for 25 years. It went from 145 in 1986 to 135 in 1996. Six of these RCM have direct access to the estuary of the Saint Lawrence de ces MRC, the two others (La Matapédia and Témiscouata) are entirely landlocked.

Fourteen unorganized areas, most of which are uninhabited, do not belong to any municipality. These areas, which contain 37% of the land area of the region, are administered by the RCM which are responsible of the local services.

There also exist two Indian reserves under the jurisdiction of the Maliseet First Nation of Viger. The bureau of the community stands on an area of 0.17 hectare, located alongside the river Cacouna, while an area of 161 ha (400 acres), located along the route 185 in a forested area of the canton of Kataskomiq, holds the function of a meeting point for the community. The two territories do not possess any permanent inhabitants.

== Politics and administration ==
=== Administrative divisions ===
- Regional county municipalities (RCM), with populations per 2016 census
  - Kamouraska Regional County Municipality - 21,073
  - La Matapédia Regional County Municipality - 17,925
  - La Mitis Regional County Municipality - 18,210
  - Les Basques Regional County Municipality - 8,694
  - La Matanie Regional County Municipality - 21,301
  - Rimouski-Neigette Regional County Municipality - 56,650
  - Rivière-du-Loup Regional County Municipality - 33,958
  - Témiscouata Regional County Municipality - 19,574
- Indian reserves
  - Cacouna (not to be confused with Cacouna the city)
  - Kataskomiq

Inside the RCMs are important cities including:

- Rimouski (Rimouski-Neigette RCM)
- Rivière-du-Loup (Rivière-du-Loup RCM)
- Matane (La Matanie RCM)
- Mont-Joli (La Mitis RCM)
- Amqui (La Matapédia RCM)

==== Cities ====
===== Rimouski =====
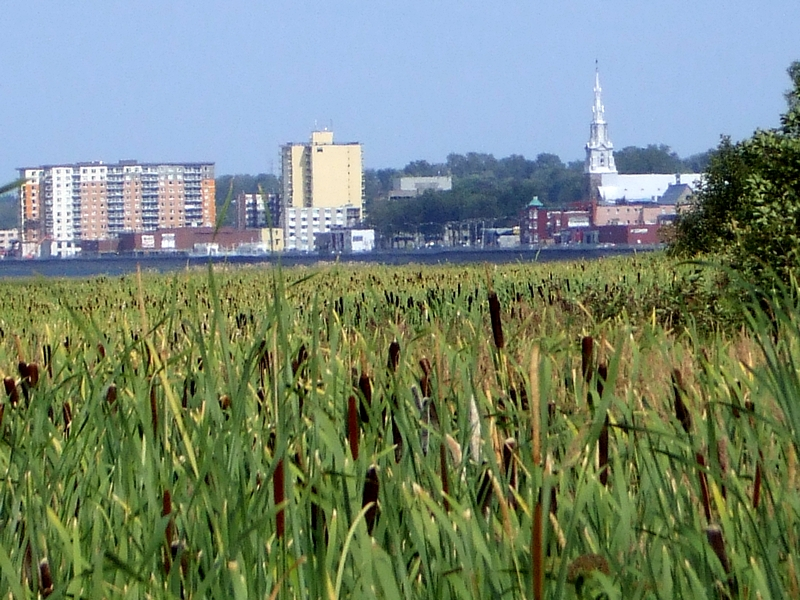
Rimouski

As a service centre, the city of Rimouski is the main urban centre of Bas-Saint-Laurent, located on the south bank of the St. Lawrence, east of Quebec City. Located 325 km (202 mi) away from the capital of Quebec, the city is the economic, social and cultural metropolis of the region. A number of major regional institutions, like Université du Québec à Rimouski, the cégep de Rimouski, the Roman Catholic Archdiocese of Rimouski, the courthouse, the federal and provincial public administration, the seat of a number of companies and the regional hospital of Rimouski, the most important hospital centre of eastern Quebec, are located there.

With a population of 47,687 inhabitants in 2012, this new city created in 2002, as part of the municipal reorganizations which occurred across Quebec. In this reorganization the city of Rimouski was fused with the municipalities of Rimouski-Est, Pointe-au-Père, Sainte-Odile-sur-Rimouski, Sainte-Blandine and Mont-Lebel. Another process of municipal fusion added the municipality Le Bic to the city on the 16 of September 2009. The area of the new city covers 529 km^{2} (204 sq mi) and extends itself along the route 132 and the river on 50 km (31 mi).

===== Rivière-du-Loup =====
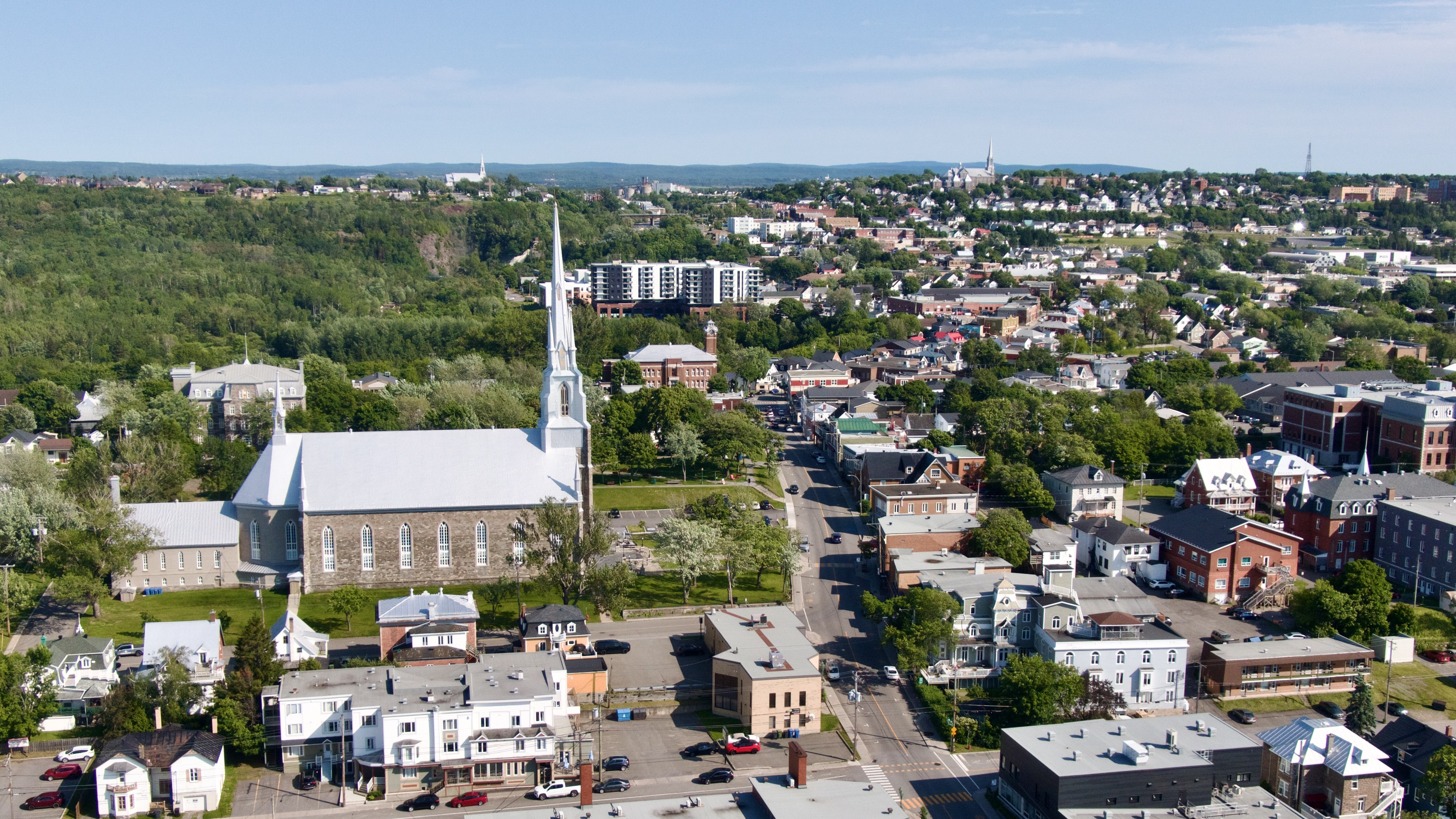
Rivière-du-Loup

Rivière-du-Loup is the second most important city of Bas-Saint-Laurent. The main concurrent of Rimouski, the city houses 19,695 inhabitants in 2012. It is the result of the merging of Rivière-du-Loup with the municipality of the parish of Saint-Patrice-de-la-Rivière-du-Loup.

===== Matane =====
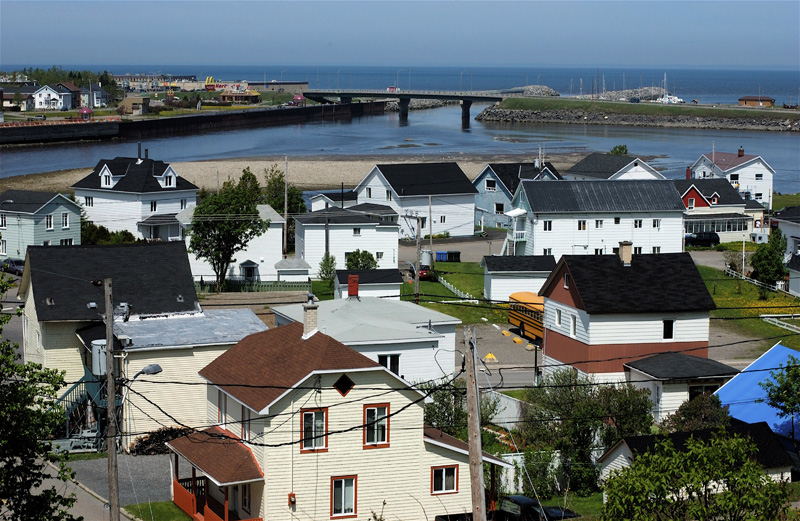
Matane

The city of Matane is the third-largest city of the region by population. Granted as a fief and seigniory to Mathieu D'Amours in 1667 when it was a trading post of the fur trade and a fishing port, it is also the easternmost city of Bas-Saint-Laurent. Matane is sometimes considered as part of Gaspésie, like in the tourism sector where it is part of the touristic region of Gaspésie. Two small neighboring municipalities, Petit-Matane and Saint-Luc-de-Matane were appended to the city in 2001. Matane was home to 14,504 inhabitants in 2012.

===== Other cities =====
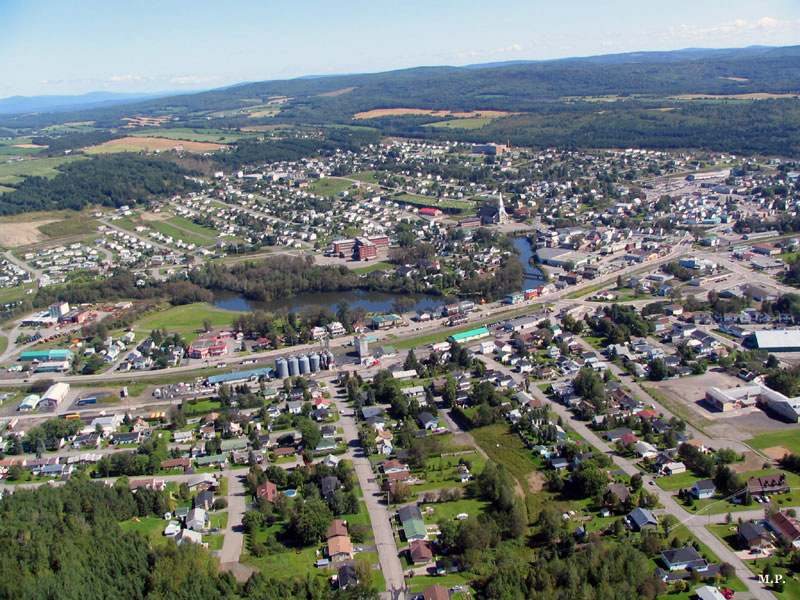
Amqui

Mont-Joli (6,673 inhabitants in 2012) is a turning plate of transportation in eastern Quebec. It is the eastern end of the autoroute 20 since 2008, The city contains a train station and Mont-Joli Airport operating regular flights to Montreal, Quebec, Côte-Nord and the Magdalen Islands. A foundry and transformation factories of goods taken from the forest are the main employers of the city.

Located at the confluence of the Matapédia and Humqui rivers, Amqui (6,292 inhabitants in 2012) is the most important town of the Matapedia Valley and the administrative centre of RCM of La Matapédia. Founded in 1907, the exploitation of the surrounding forest long constituted the main activity of the city. Today, the forestry industry of Matapedia seeks to optimize their use of the wood with projects to develop the use of the residual biomass for energetic ends and the production of goods of second and third transformation in collaboration with the Service de recherche et d’expertise en transformation des produits forestiers (SEREX), an entity attached to the cégep de Rimouski.

Témiscouata-sur-le-Lac (5,085 inhabitants in 2012), is the result of the fusion of the towns of Cabano and Notre-Dame-du-Lac in 2010. This administrative centre of the RCM of Témiscouata, like the rest of its RCM, owes its wealth principally to agriculture, the maple syrup industry and forestry. Since 1976, the factory Norampac owned by the company Cascades which manufactures corrugated fiberboard and a manufacturer of prefabricated homes are established in the municipality.

La Pocatière (4,242 inhabitants in 2012) is the largest city of the RCM of Kamouraska. Seat of the Diocese of Sainte-Anne-de-la-Pocatière, of the cégep de La Pocatière and one of the two campuses of the Institut de technologie agroalimentaire, the city has had a strong agricultural sector since the end of the 17th century. Its economy benefits from the presence of a factory assembling rolling stocks owned by the company Bombardier Transportation.

Trois-Pistoles (3,471 inhabitants in 2012) is the administrative centre of the RCM Les Basques, the least populated of the eight RCMs of Bas-Saint-Laurent. Its economy is dominated by agriculture and tourism.

=== School districts ===
Francophone:

- Commission scolaire du Fleuve-et-des-Lacs (Les Basques and Témiscouata).
- Commission scolaire de Kamouraska - Rivière-du-Loup
- Commission scolaire des Monts-et-Marées (La Matapédia and Matane).
- Commission scolaire des Phares (La Mitis and Rimouski-Neigette).

Anglophone:

- Eastern Shores School Board

=== Representation and political tendencies ===
Since the modification of the electoral map of Quebec in 2011, three constituencies are entirely located inside the region of Bas-Saint-Laurent: Matane-Matapédia, Rimouski et Rivière-du-Loup–Témiscouata. The voters of the western part of the region are part of the constituency of Côte-du-Sud, shared between the regions of Bas-Saint-Laurent and Chaudière-Appalaches.

The Maliseet are also represented by the Maliseet First Nation of Viger.

==== Provincial representation ====
The region is represented in the National Assembly of Quebec since the 2014 Quebec general election by :

- Matane-Matapédia : Pascal Bérubé (PQ)
- Rimouski : Harold LeBel (PQ).
- Rivière-du-Loup–Témiscouata : Jean D'Amour (QLP)
- Côte-du-Sud : Norbert Morin (QLP).

With the exception of Rimouski's, all constituencies voted "no" during the 1980 Quebec referendum. In 1992, the five constituencies of Bas-Saint-Laurent refused the Charlottetown Accord. Three years later, every constituency votes "yes" to the 1995 Quebec referendum.

==== Federal representation ====
Bas-Saint-Laurent is represented in the House of Commons of Canada since the 2025 Canadian federal election by :

- Rimouski—La Matapédia, situated entirely within the administrative region: Maxime Blanchette-Joncas (BQ);
- Côte-du-Sud—Rivière-du-Loup—Kataskomiq—Témiscouata, including voters from Chaudière-Appalaches: Bernard Généreux (CPC);
- Gaspésie—Les Îles-de-la-Madeleine—Listuguj, also contains voters from the region of Gaspésie–Îles-de-la-Madeleine: Alexis Deschênes (BQ).

== Economy ==
The economy of Bas-Saint-Laurent was long dominated by two traditional industries: agriculture and forestry, with, in keeping with the location, additional fishing and tourism industries, including indigenous fishing. The fishing industry traditionally exploited mostly species like the cod, the herring, and the eel; this was supplemented by the harvest of crustaceans and seaweed. This last good was either exported to the United States or used locally to produce mattresses and cushions. While agriculture was first only present in the narrow valley near the banks of the river, forestry was already a critical industry in the mid-1800s, and expands in the plateaus of the hinterland later on.

Since the start of the 20th century, the region is turning towards the second and third transformations of its resources and is attempting to create new markets, notably in marine technology and biotechnology, environmentally friendly construction and peat usage. Like in the rest of Quebec, the economy of the region is dominated by small and medium companies, as 96% employ less than 50 people.

=== Gross domestic product and disposable income ===
Often considered as a resource well by the government of Quebec, Bas-Saint-Laurent possesses a strong divide between its four industrial centers, Rimouski, Rivière-du-Loup, La Pocatière and Matane, as these benefited from the growth of the knowledge and high tech industry to assure their development and the smaller communities outside of these industrial centers often depending on a single industry from sectors in difficulty.

The Institut de la statistique du Québec reports that the gross domestic product of the region was of 5 billions in 2009, registering a growth of 1.3% compared to the previous year. The growth of the service economy is the main factor in this growth, and it now represents 70% of the regional economy, a figure close to the 71.6% of Quebec as a whole. In the good production sector, traditional industries register a sharp decline, as forestry declines by 25%, while the industries transforming wood and the paper industry declined by more than 12%.

The GDP per capita of the region was at $30,376 in 2010, which puts Bas-Saint-Laurent at the 13th place among the 17 Administrative regions of Quebec. The disposable and discretionary income was at $29,069. Excluding the amount taken by direct taxation and non-wage labour costs, the income per capita is at $23,044, the smallest income in Quebec after the neighbouring region of Gaspésie–Îles-de-la-Madeleine.

Each inhabitant of Bas-Saint-Laurent receives an average of $7,021 from the state, an amount superior the average of $5878 in Quebec. The unemployment rate being above Quebec's average and the larger share of the population eligible to receive benefits from the government program of Old Age Security and Retraite Quebec explain this more generous welfare.

Statistics on the regional level do hide significant differences between the two most urbanized RCMs, Rimouski-Neigette and Rivière-du-Loup and the six others, who are more rural. The average disposable income in the RCM of Rimouski being $25,165, this is 20% more than in the RCMs of Témiscouata ($20,306) and La Matapédia ($20,603).

=== Employment ===
Even Bas-Saint-Laurent is located at the 13th place among the 17 regions of Quebec in GDP per capita, it sports an unemployment rate of 8.0% in 2011, a figure in decline of 2% compared to the previous year. The share of the workforce in the population is at 58.7% and the employment rate is at 54.1%, a figure which has risen by 0.5% since 2010. This growth can be explained by the reduced share of the population in working age which dropped by 1,400, but as well by a slight growth of 800 new available jobs. The 90,200 employed men and women of the region have only a slight divide in employment rate and nearly a quarter of them (21,800) work in industries producing goods.

A study performed in 2009 by the Secor firm notes that the decline of the population under 20 years old combined with the timid growth of the workforce and the drop of the unemployment rate will create a workforce shortage in the coming years. The signs of this new reality in the workforce are already apparent, as Secor notes, taking as an example the thirty programs of professional and technic formations that struggle to recruit enough students.

=== Primary sector ===
==== Agriculture and food industry ====
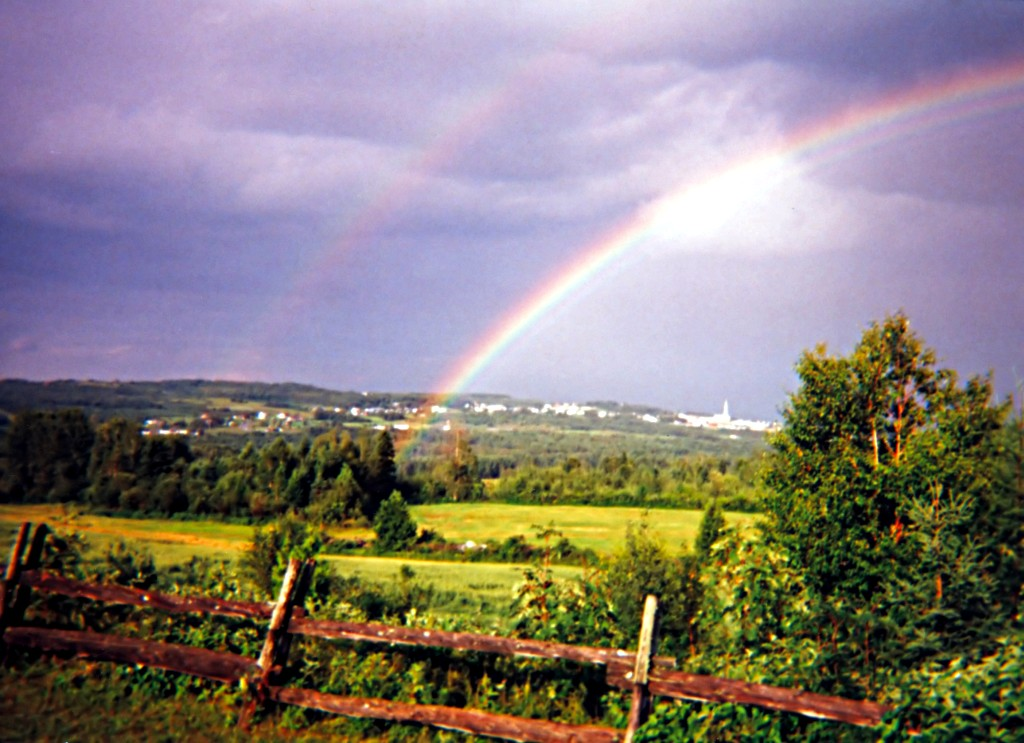
Saint-Louis-du-Ha! Ha!

The land area devoted to agriculture in the region covered 3,515 km^{2} (1,357 sq mi) in 2005, which is around 15.6% of its land area and contributed to more than 6% of its gross domestic product. This industry is mainly located in the plain following the banks of the river and in the foothills of the valleys of Témiscouata and Matapédia.

In 2007, the dairy production had the largest share among all regional agricultural productions with 50% of the revenue, according to the Ministry of Agriculture, Fisheries and Food. In this industry, a reinforcement of the activities can be observed with a reduction of the number of independent companies but with a global growth of 12% of the milk quotas between 1997 and 2007. The region takes first place in sheep farming, with 32% of all lambs produced in Quebec in 2007. Bas-Saint-Laurent also practices beef cattle farming and pig farming.

The maple syrup industry is in growth, as the cuts increased from 3.7 to 6.3 million between 1997 and 2007. The industry producing small fruits like the strawberry, the raspberry, the blueberry is stagnant, and the land area devoted to the growth of cereal grew by 10%, while the one devoted to the market garden industry shrunk.

==== Forestry industry ====
The forestry industry of Bas-Saint-Laurent took a hard hit during the American housing market crisis and the ensuing decrease in new projects, as these hit a roof of 500 000 in 2009. Even as new housing projects start to reappear and factories start producing more once again, the industry still continues to turn itself to non traditional markets and tries to sell smaller-diameter softwood logs.

==== Peat industry ====
The peat industry of Bas-Saint-Laurent extracts around 45% of the peat production of Quebec and builds specialized transformation tools de tourbe. There are around twenty companies in this industry that employ 1 500 and export 80% of their. Lately, this industry has made a great effort in converging with the agroenvironnemental industry, in fields like biofiltration, composting, agriculture and horticulture

Around 2002, a number of initiatives were taken by the producers of the industry and the government of Quebec to develop the industry. The producers managed to perform a life-cycle assessment of the peat and experiment new processes to rehabilitate commercially exploited bogs.

=== Secondary sector ===
With the recession caused by the subprime mortgage crisis in the United States, the wood manufacturing industry, most important manufacturing industry of the region, suffered greatly due to its inability to export in this market, but should recover along with the American economy. Some niches, like biomass valorization, might heal this industry, as well as it turning to new markets.

Other industries benefit from a favorable economic climate. This is notably the case for Enercon and other companies of the wind industry in Matane and the factory of Bombardier Transportation at La Pocatière, which will fulfill an assembly contract of rolling stocks for the cities of Montreal and New York.

=== Tertiary sector ===
The tertiary sector of Bas-Saint-Laurent today comprises the majority of the employed population everywhere in the region, but the four main cities of the region, Rimouski, Rivière-du-Loup, La Pocatière and Matane, hold the majority of the employment in the sector, and all the regional institutions and infrastructure are mostly located there.

==== Tourism industry ====
The administrative region of Bas-Saint-Laurent is divided into two areas of tourism administration and promotion. The six western RCM form the touristic region of Bas-Saint-Laurent, while the RCMs of Matane and La Matapédia are part of the touristic region of the Gaspé Peninsula.

Tourism is an important source of seasonal employment in the region, which possesses a few important tourist attraction sites.

- Jardins de Métis
- Site historique maritime de la Pointe-au-Père
- Pointe-au-Père National Wildlife Area
- Lac-Témiscouata National Park
- Bic National Park

==== Transportation ====
Most of Bas-Saint-Laurent's car traffic transits through three highways: the Autoroute 20, which goes throughout the region west of Mont-Joli, with the exception of a section between L'Isle-Verte and Le Bic, Autoroute 85 and Route 185 passing through Témiscouata by the north-west of New Brunswick as well as the Route 132, which surrounds Gaspé Peninsula east of Sainte-Flavie. A fourth important road links Matane and Amqui by following the Matane River.

Two road projects are being carried out.

The road-work has been ongoing since 2002 with the goal of turning Route 185 into a motorway. The first phase of the project was part of a program aiming to improve road safety and was completed in 2011. The second phase should lengthen the motorway by 33 km (21 mi) and should be concluded between the fall of 2013 and 2015. The last phase of the road-work linking Saint-Antonin to Saint-Louis-du-Ha! Ha! with a length of 40 km (25 mi) being worked on was authorized by the government in 2011. The third phase is expected by the Ministère des Transports, de la Mobilité durable et de l'Électrification des Transports du Québec to be completed by 2025.

== Major communities ==
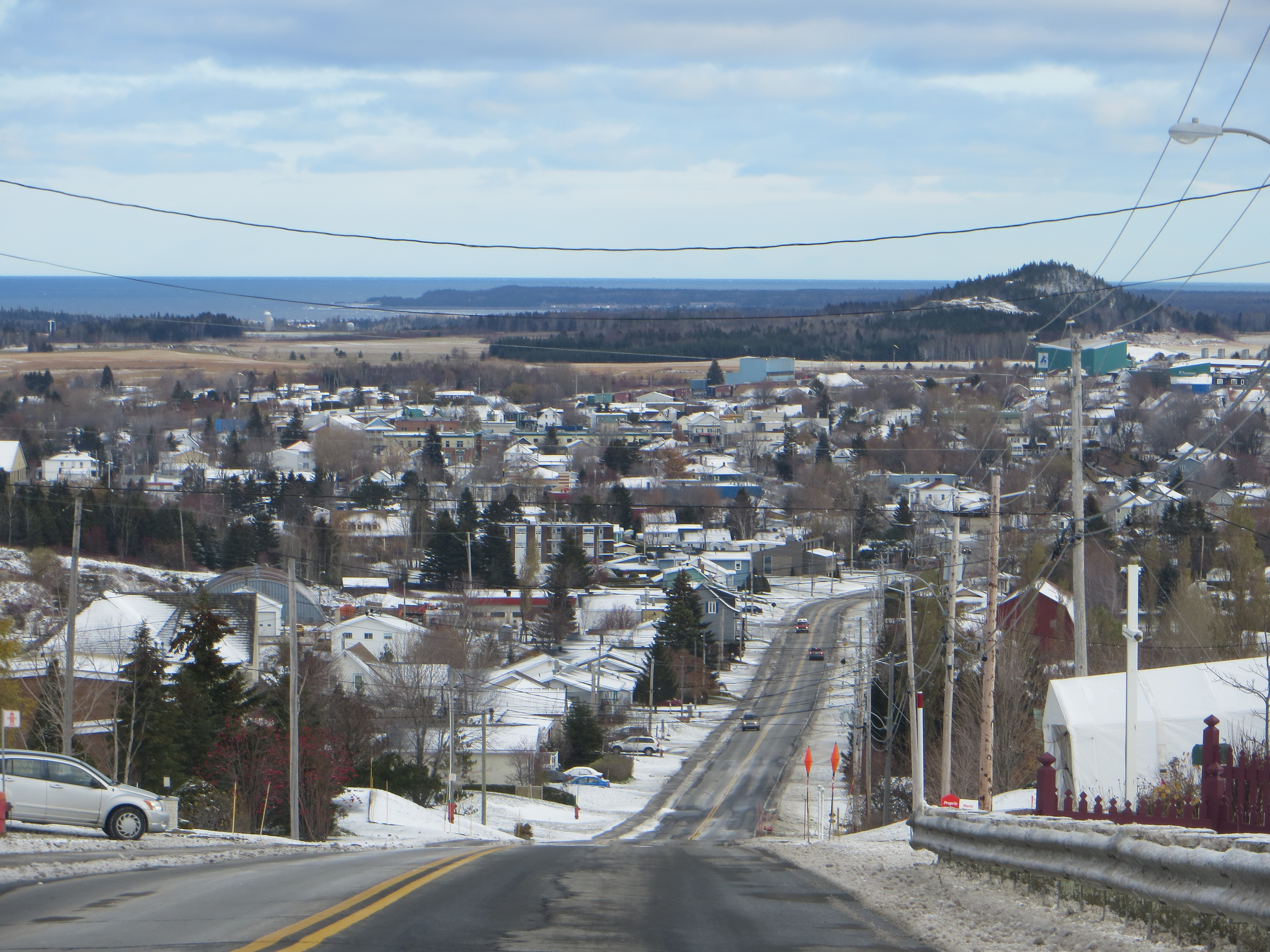
Mont-Joli

- Amqui
- Dégelis
- La Pocatière
- Matane
- Mont-Joli
- Pohénégamook
- Rimouski
- Rivière-du-Loup
- Saint-Anaclet-de-Lessard
- Saint-Antonin
- Saint-Pascal
- Sainte-Luce
- Témiscouata-sur-le-Lac
- Trois-Pistoles

== See also ==
- List of Quebec regions
- List of historic places in Bas-Saint-Laurent
- Maritime Quebec
- Maison Joseph-Gauvreau
