= Saint-Louis-du-Ha! Ha! =

Parish municipality in Quebec

- Parish municipality
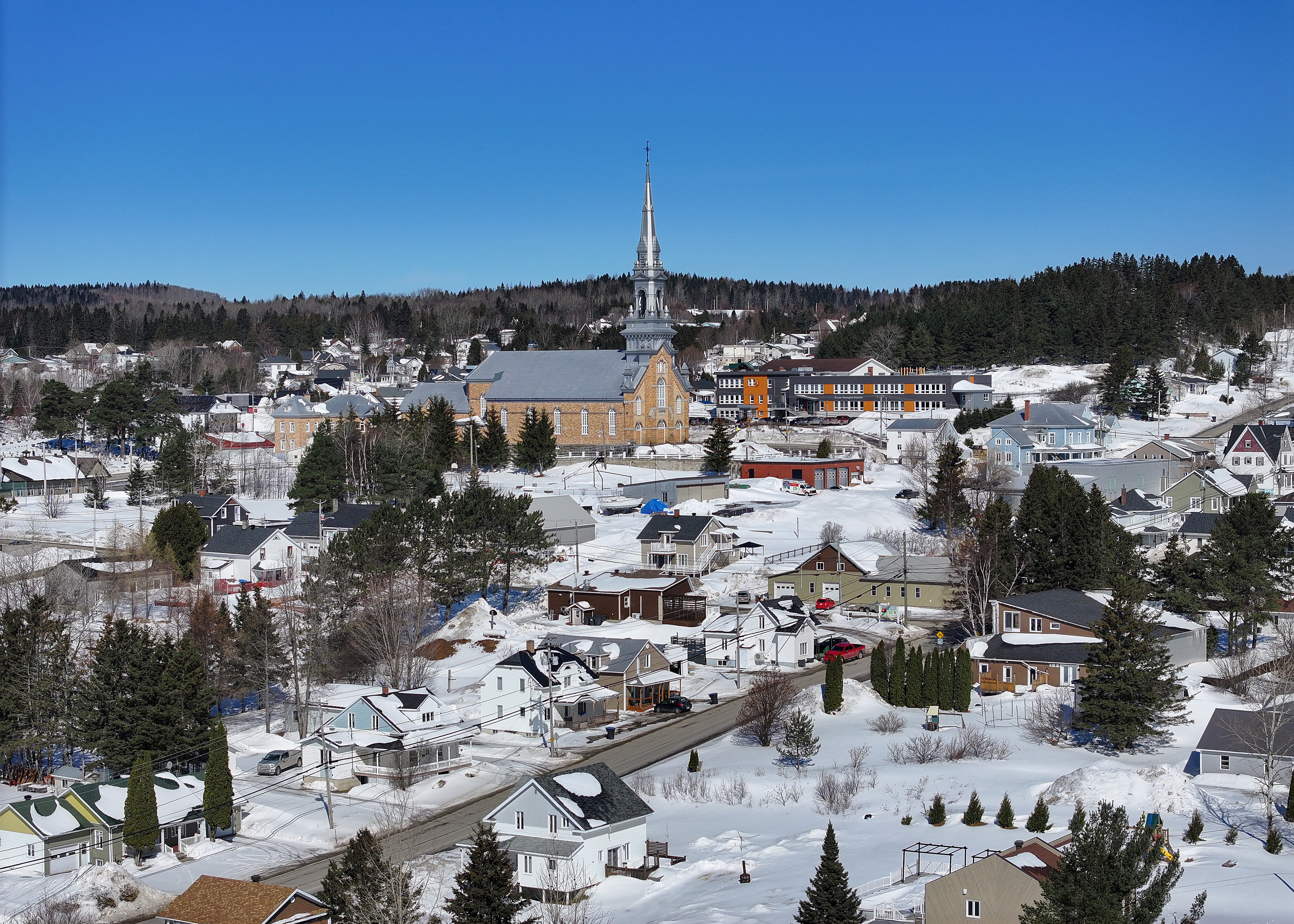
- Aerial view of Saint-Louis-du-Ha! Ha!

- Coat of arms
- Motto: Solidaire dans le labeur (French) "Solidarity in work"
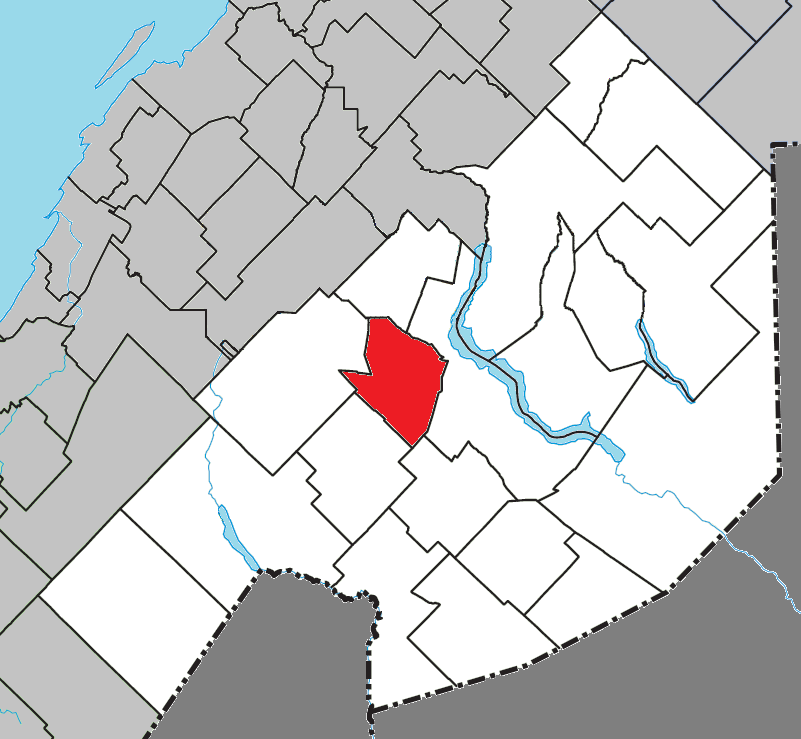
- Location within Témiscouata RCM

- Location in eastern Quebec
- Coordinates: 47°40′13″N 68°58′54″W
- Country: Canada
- Province: Quebec
- Region: Bas-Saint-Laurent
- RCM: Témiscouata
- Named: 1874
- Constituted: 14 July 1874

Government
  - Mayor: Mélissa Lord
  - Federal riding: Côte-du-Sud—Rivière-du-Loup—Kataskomiq—Témiscouata
  - Prov. riding: Rivière-du-Loup–Témiscouata–Les Basques

Area
  - Total: 112.23 km^{2} (43.33 sq mi)
  - Land: 110.08 km^{2} (42.50 sq mi)
- The provincial and federal governments disagree on the total area; the latter makes no claim regarding the land area.

Population (2021)
  - Total: 1,311
  - Density: 11.7/km^{2} (30/sq mi)
  - Pop 2016-2021: ▲1.5%
  - Dwellings: 594
- Time zone: UTC−5 (EST)
  - Summer (DST): UTC−4 (EDT)
- Postal code(s): G0L 3S0
- Area codes: 418 and 581
- Highways: A-85 (TCH)
- Website: www.saintlouisduhaha.com

Saint-Louis-du-Ha! Ha! (French pronunciation: [sɛ̃ lwi dy a a]) is a parish municipality in the Canadian province of Quebec, part of the Témiscouata Regional County Municipality in the Bas-Saint-Laurent region. The population is 1,311 as of 2021 and its economy is mainly agricultural.

Saint-Louis-du-Ha! Ha! is located southeast of Rivière-du-Loup and west of Cabano along the Trans-Canada Highway (A-85), about halfway to Edmundston in New Brunswick.

== History ==
The parish began in 1860 as the site of a Catholic mission; it was named in 1874.

Haha is an archaic French word meaning "unexpected obstacle", referring in this case to a sharp bend in nearby Lake Témiscouata, at which voyageurs heading for the St. Lawrence River would have to leave the lake and make a long portage (see Chemin du Portage). Alternative explanations linking the name to various Amerindian words are regarded as fanciful.

Saint-Louis-du-Ha! Ha! is the only town in the world with two exclamation marks in its name (Westward Ho!, in Devon, England, has one). In September 2017, the municipality received a Guinness World Record for the most exclamation marks in a town name.

== Demographics ==
In the 2021 Census of Population conducted by Statistics Canada, Saint-Louis-du-Ha! Ha! had a population of 1,311 living in 552 of its 594 total private dwellings, a change of 1.5% from its 2016 population of 1,292. With a land area of 112.23 km^{2} (43.33 sq mi), it had a population density of 11.7/km^{2} (30.3/sq mi) in 2021.

== See also ==
- Baie des Ha! Ha!, a bay on the St. Lawrence River
- Baie des Ha! Ha!, a bay on the Saguenay River
- Rivière Ha! Ha!, a tributary of the Saguenay
- Est! Est!! Est!!! di Montefiascone
- Hamilton, Ohio, a city that briefly added an exclamation point to its name
- List of parish municipalities in Quebec
