= Rivière des Vases =

Rivière des Vases may refer to:

- Rivière des Vases (Nicolet River tributary), Ham-Nord, Arthabaska Regional County Municipality, Quebec, Canada
- Rivière des Vases (L'Isle-Verte), a tributary of St. Lawrence River, L'Isle-Verte, Quebec, Canada
