= Rivière des Vases (L'Isle-Verte) =

River in Bas-Saint-Laurent, Quebec (Canada)

Location
- Country: Canada
- Province: Quebec
- Region: Bas-Saint-Laurent
- MRC: Rivière-du-Loup Regional County Municipality

Physical characteristics
- Source: Various agricultural streams
  - location: Saint-Arsène
  - coordinates: 47.936753°N 69.413924°W
  - elevation: 64 m (210 ft)
- Mouth: St. Lawrence River
  - location: L'Isle-Verte
  - coordinates: 48.00417°N 69.4075°W
  - elevation: 4 m (13 ft)
- Length: 11.3 km (7.0 mi)

Basin features
- River system: St. Lawrence River
- Tributaries
  - left: (upstream)
  - right: (upstream)

The rivière des Vases (in English: rivières of vases) flows in the municipalities of Saint-Arsène, Cacouna and L'Isle-Verte, in the Rivière-du-Loup Regional County Municipality (MRC), in the administrative region of Bas-Saint-Laurent, in Quebec, in Canada.

The Rivière des Vases is a tributary of the south shore of the St. Lawrence River near L'Isle-Verte.

== Geography ==
The Rivière des Vases takes its source from agricultural streams located to the south-east of a peat bog area in the municipality of Saint-Arsène. This spring is located northwest of Heritage Street and the Canadian National Railway, 5.6 kilometres (3.5 mi) southeast of the southeastern coast of estuary of Saint Lawrence, 3.5 kilometres (2.2 mi) northeast of the center of the village of Saint-Arsène and 10.3 kilometres (6.4 mi) southwest of the village bridge L'Isle-Verte.

From its source, the Rivière des Vases flows over 11.3 kilometres (7.0 mi) in the following segments:

- 1.1 kilometres (0.68 mi) north-west in Saint-Arsène, then north, until you reach a road;
- 2.7 kilometres (1.7 mi) north, up to the limit of the municipality of Cacouna;
- 2.1 kilometres (1.3 mi) north-west in Cacouna, up to the limit of the municipality of L'Isle-Verte;
- 0.9 kilometres (0.56 mi) northeasterly, up to route 132;
- 2.2 kilometres (1.4 mi) northward, collecting the waters of the Petit Lac stream (coming from the southwest), to the confluence of the Réal-Filion stream;
- 1.9 kilometres (1.2 mi) north-west, to Chemin de la Rivière-des-Vases;
- 0.4 kilometres (0.25 mi) to the north, where the river flows into a small bay (length: 350 metres (1,150 ft)) which gradually widens to the confluence of the river.

The Rivière des Vases flows over the flats of the St. Lawrence River in the municipality of L'Isle-Verte, facing the Île Verte, located at 2.9 kilometres (1.8 mi) off the coast. This confluence is located 5.3 kilometres (3.3 mi) west of the bridge in the village of L'Isle-Verte and 2.4 kilometres (1.5 mi) northwest of Route 132.

== Toponymy ==
According to the Commission de toponymie du Québec, the name of this watercourse has appeared at least since 1925 on or in certain documents, cartographic and others. The origin of the toponym refers to the muddy character of several segments of this river, particularly at its confluence. The straightness of certain segments of its course is dependent on the application of provincial policies of digging small watercourses to increase the efficiency of agricultural land.

The toponym “rivière des Vases” was made official on December 5, 1968, at the Commission de toponymie du Québec.

== See also ==
- List of rivers of Quebec
