= Bic National Park =

National park of Quebec, Canada

- IUCN category II (national park)
- Bic National Park in 2026
- Interactive map of Bic National Park
- Location: Rimouski / St-Fabien, Rimouski-Neigette Regional County Municipality, Quebec, Canada
- Nearest city: Rimouski
- Coordinates: 48°21′N 68°47′W
- Area: 33.2 km^{2} (8,200 acres)
- Established: 7 Nov 1984
- Visitors: 166,450 (in 2005)
- Governing body: SEPAQ

Bic National Park is an 33.2-square-kilometre (8,200-acre) national park of Quebec, Canada, located on the south shore of the St. Lawrence River, near the villages of Le Bic and Saint-Fabien, southwest of Rimouski. It was founded on October 17, 1984, and is home to large populations of harbour seals and grey seals. Its highest point is Pic Champlain at 346 metres (1,135 ft). Slightly less than half of the park is a coastal marine environment.

The park is owned by the Ministry of Sustainable Development, Environment and Parks of Quebec. It is managed by the Société des établissements de plein air du Québec (SÉPAQ).

Bic National Park is typical of the southern coast of the Gulf of St. Lawrence, containing several characteristics of this region:

- Low-flow rivers (la rivière du Sud-Ouest)
- Salt marshes (the marsh at Pointe-au-Spruce)
- Rocky hills with a very steep northern slope and a relatively gentle southern slope (Pic Champlain, Citadelle, Cap-l'Orignal, etc.)

== History ==
Human occupation of Bic dates back almost 7,000 years: the park interpretive centre displays tools from that time.

=== Battle at Baie de Bic ===
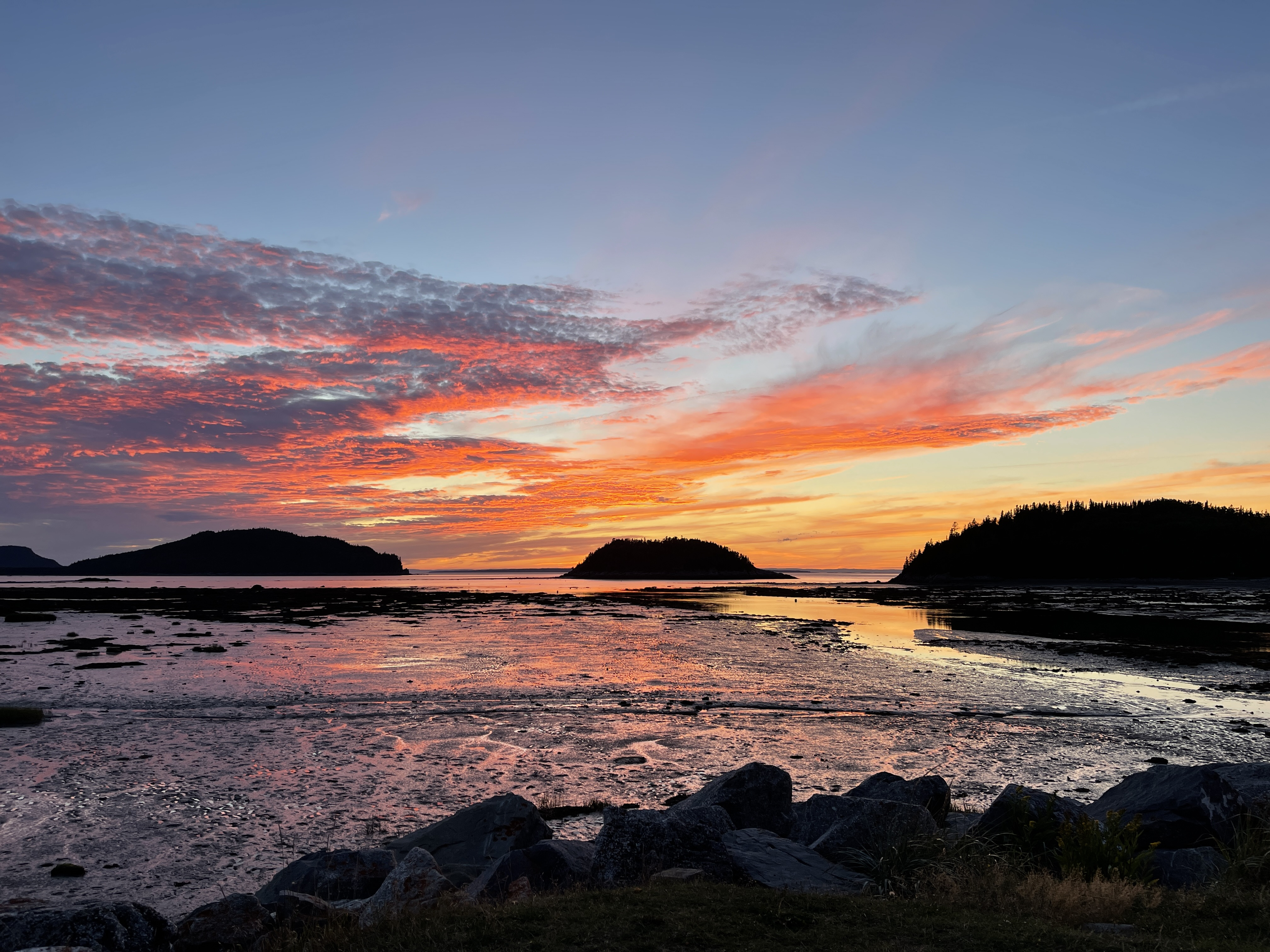
Maritine estuary of St. Lawrence River, mouth of the Bic River, Brûlée Island, Massacre Island, capes, mountains, rocks and silt

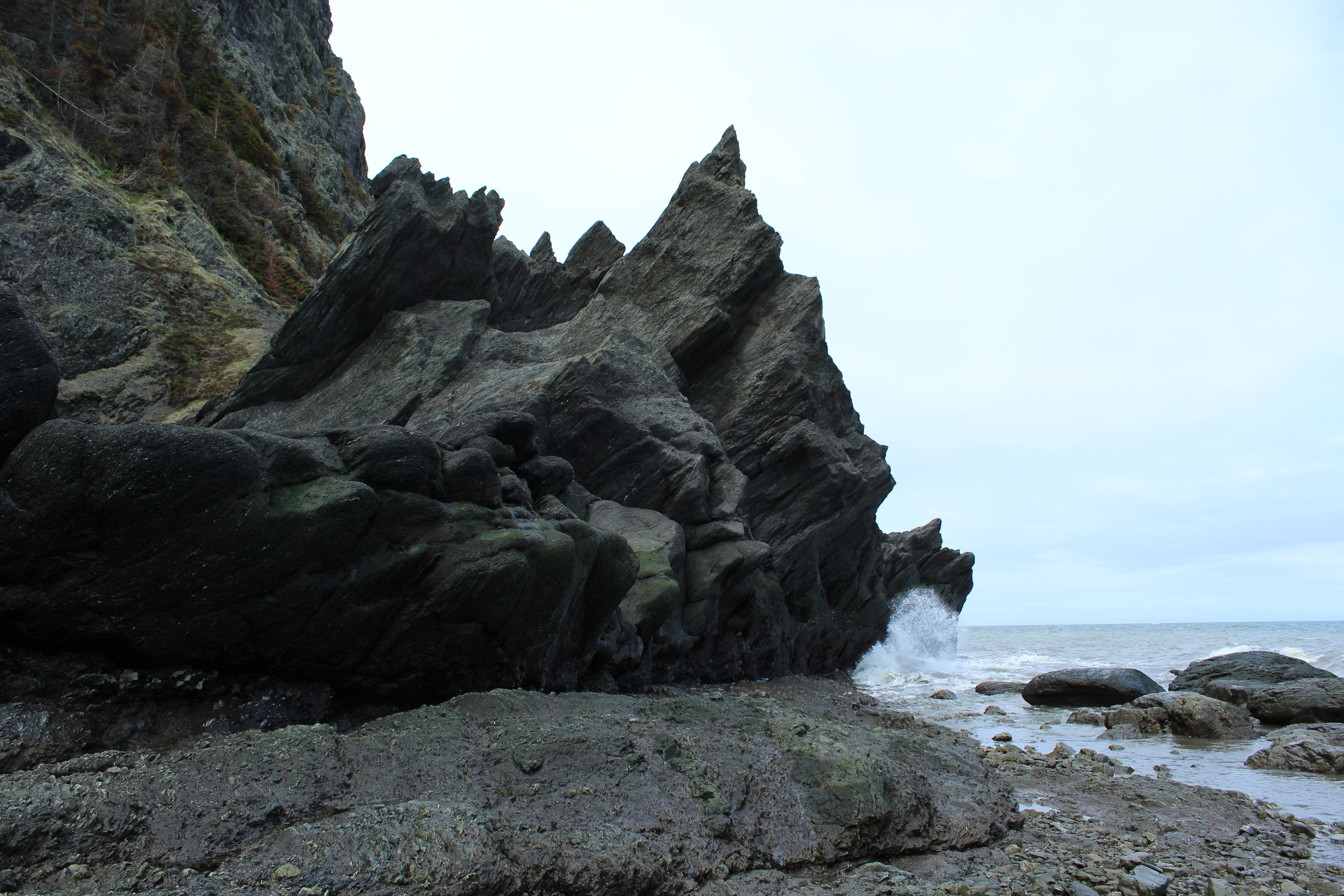
Waves crash on the coast at L'Anse à L'Original

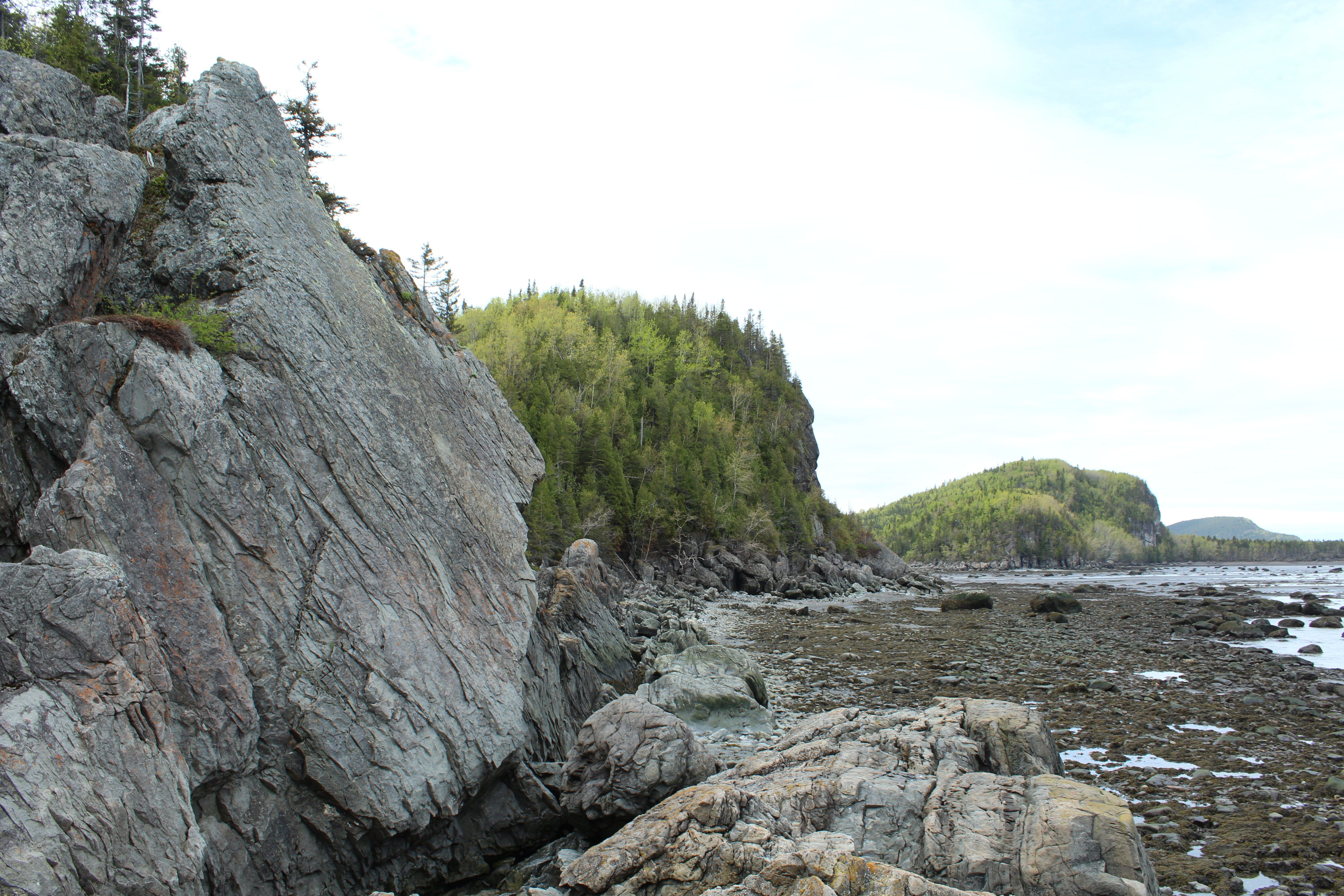
Low tide on Île aux Amours

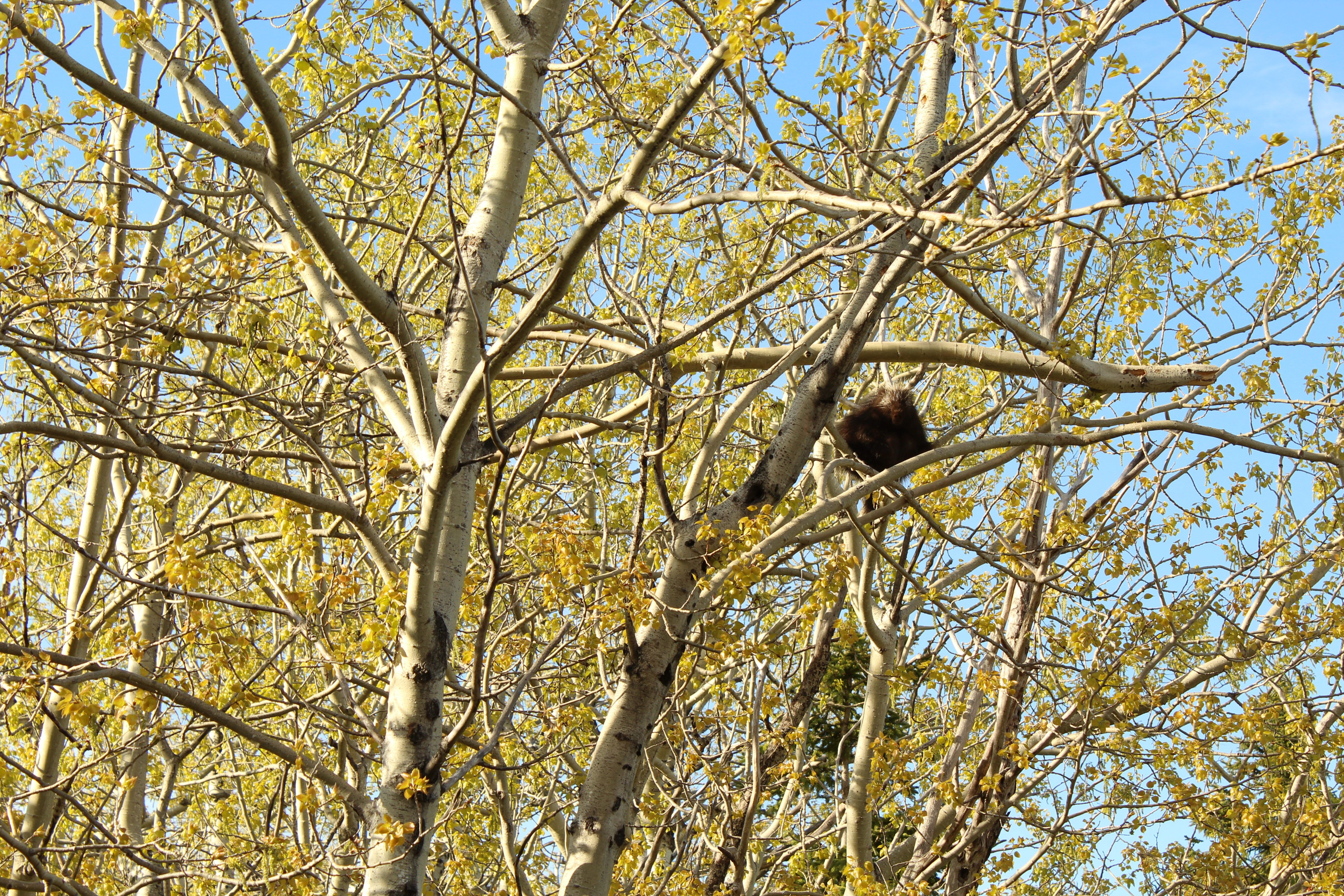
Porcupine Near Wootton House

Jacques Cartier tells of the Battle of the Bay of Bic in the spring of 1534 when 100 Haudenosaunee warriors massacred a group of 200 Mi'kmaq on what he called Massacre Island in the St. Lawrence River. The Bay of Bic was an annual gathering place for Mi'kmaq along the St. Lawrence. Mi'kmaq scouting parties warned of an impending Haudenosaunee attack the night before the Haudenosaunee arrival. The Mi'kmaq took away 30 of the sick and elderly, while about 200 Mi'kmaq left their encampment on the shore and retreated to the island in the bay. There they took cover in a cave, covering the entrance with branches. The Haudenosaunee arrived in the morning. Finding the encampment deserted, they divided into search parties but failed to find the Mi'kmaq until the morning of the next day.

The Mi'kmaq warriors defended the tribe against the Haudenosaunee assault. Initially, after many had been wounded on both sides, with the rising tide, the Mi'kmaq were able to repulse the assault and the Haudenosaunee retreated to the mainland. The Mikmaq prepared a fortification on the island in preparation for the next assault at low tide. The Haudenosaunee were again repulsed and retreated to the mainland with the rising tide. By the following morning, with low tide the Haudenosaunee made their final approach. They had prepared burning arrows which burned down the fortification and wiped out the Mi'kmaq. Twenty Haudenosaunee were killed and thirty wounded in the battle. The Haudenosaunee divided into two companies to return to their canoes on the Bouabouscache River.

No French seigneur settled in the area during the period of New France, but after the Battle of Quebec in 1759, an English lord named Campbell settled there.

In the decades that followed, a maritime pilot post was established at Bic Island, opposite the park. It remained there until 1905 when it was relocated to Pointe-au-Père. The pilots had meanwhile settled on the banks of the St. Lawrence River, where they undertook subsistence farming.

At the end of the 19th century, several English villagers built cottages and country houses in the area of the park. Many of these homes are still standing today, although ownership has passed to the park. Among them are the Lyman Cottage, Feindel Cottage, and Wootton House which are on the shores of Anse à l'Original (on le Chemin du Nord trail).

From the late 1970s, preparations began to allow the formal establishment of the park, in 1984. Management of the park was transferred to Société des établissements de plein air du Québec (SÉPAQ) in 1999, by the same act which established Bic as a National park.

== Hikes ==
Trail	Length	Difficulty
Le Contrebandier; The Smuggler	1.1 km (0.7 mi)	Easy
Le Miquelon	1.9 km (1.2 mi)	Easy
Les Escaliers; The Stairs	0.9 km (0.6 mi)	Difficult
La Pinède; The Pinewood	1.0 km (0.6 mi)	Difficult
Le Scoggan	2.9 km (1.8 mi)	Intermediate
Le Sentier archéologique The Archaeological Trail	0.2 km (0.1 mi)	Easy
Le Chemin-du-Nord; The North Road	4.9 km (3.0 mi)	Easy
Le Pic-Champlain; The Champlain Peak	3.0 km (1.9 mi)	Intermediate
Les Murailles; The Walls	4.5 km (2.8 mi)	Difficult
La Citadelle; The Citadel	4.6 km (2.9 mi)	Intermediate
Les Anses; The Handles	1.4 km (0.9 mi)	Intermediate

== Bicycle Trails ==
Trail	Length	Difficulty
Le Portage; The Portage	4.0 km (2.5 mi)	Easy
La Grève	5.0 km (3.1 mi)	Easy
La Pointe-aux-Épinettes; Spruce Point	0.7 km (0.4 mi)	Easy
La Coulée	5.0 km (3.1 mi)	Intermediate
