= Institut de technologie agroalimentaire =

Agricultural technology school in Quebec, Canada

- Type: CEGEP
- Established: 1962
- Rector: Michel Ste-Marie (Saint-Hyacinthe); Sylvain Gingras (La Pocatière)
- Location: Saint-Hyacinthe & La Pocatière, Québec, Canada
- Campus: 2

The Institut de technologie agroalimentaire (ITA) is a collegial institute specialized in agricultural technology and food production in Quebec, Canada. The institution is composed of two campuses, one in Saint-Hyacinthe and the other in La Pocatière. The institution is managed by the Ministère de l'Agriculture, des Pêcheries et de l'Alimentation du Québec (MAPAQ).

== History ==
The origins of the ITA date back to the 19th century. The first francophone school of agriculture was founded in 1859 in Sainte-Anne-de-la-Pocatière, while the dairy school in Saint-Hyacinthe was created in 1892, the first such institution in North America.

In 1962, the Ministry of Agriculture, Fisheries and Food of Quebec (known today in French as the Ministère de l'Agriculture, des Pêcheries et de l'Alimentation, and in 1962 as the Ministère de l'Agriculture et de la Colonisation) formed the Instituts de technologie agroalimentaire. While the La Pocatière campus was an extension of the Faculty of Agronomy of Université Laval, the Saint-Hyacinthe campus was originally a dairy school founded in 1892.

== Training programs ==
The ITA offers a total of eight CEGEP-level training programs, which lead to a Quebec Diploma of College Studies. Most programs are offered at both campuses. They include:

- Gestion et technologies d'entreprise agricole
- Gestion et technologies d'entreprise agricole : Profils en production animale biologique
- Technologie des productions animales
- Paysage et commercialisation en horticulture ornementale
- Technologie de la production horticole agroenvironnementale
- Technologie du génie agromécanique
- Technologie des procédés et de la qualité des aliments
- Techniques équines

The ITA's programs listed above allow graduates to pursue university-level studies in related fields such as agronomy, agricultural economics, agricultural engineering, food engineering, biology, food science, and landscape architecture, amongst others.

The ITA also offers one training program in equine massage therapy, which leads to an attestation of college studies.

An agreement between the La Pocatière campus of the ITA and a French-language school district, the Commission scolaire des Phares (now known as the Centre de services scolaire des Phares), allowed the development of a vocational training program in animal production.

== See also ==
- Official Website of the Institut de technologie agroalimentaire
