= Non-wage labour costs =

Non-wage labour costs are social security and insurance contributions, labour taxes and other costs related to employing someone and may include:

- statutory and contractual (non-statutory) contributions covering social insurance, including retirement, healthcare, unemployment, child allowance, maternity, disability and other contingencies;
- taxes on payrolls or credits that are not directly linked to social programmes;
- cost of providing non-statutory services to employees such as additional days off work, company day-care, transportation or company cantine.

== See also ==
- National Insurance (United Kingdom)
- Social Security contributions in France
- Social Security funding in Germany
- Social security contributions in Spain
