= Cégep de Rimouski =

Public college in Rimouski, Quebec

Coordinates: 48°26′54.24″N 68°31′42.6″W

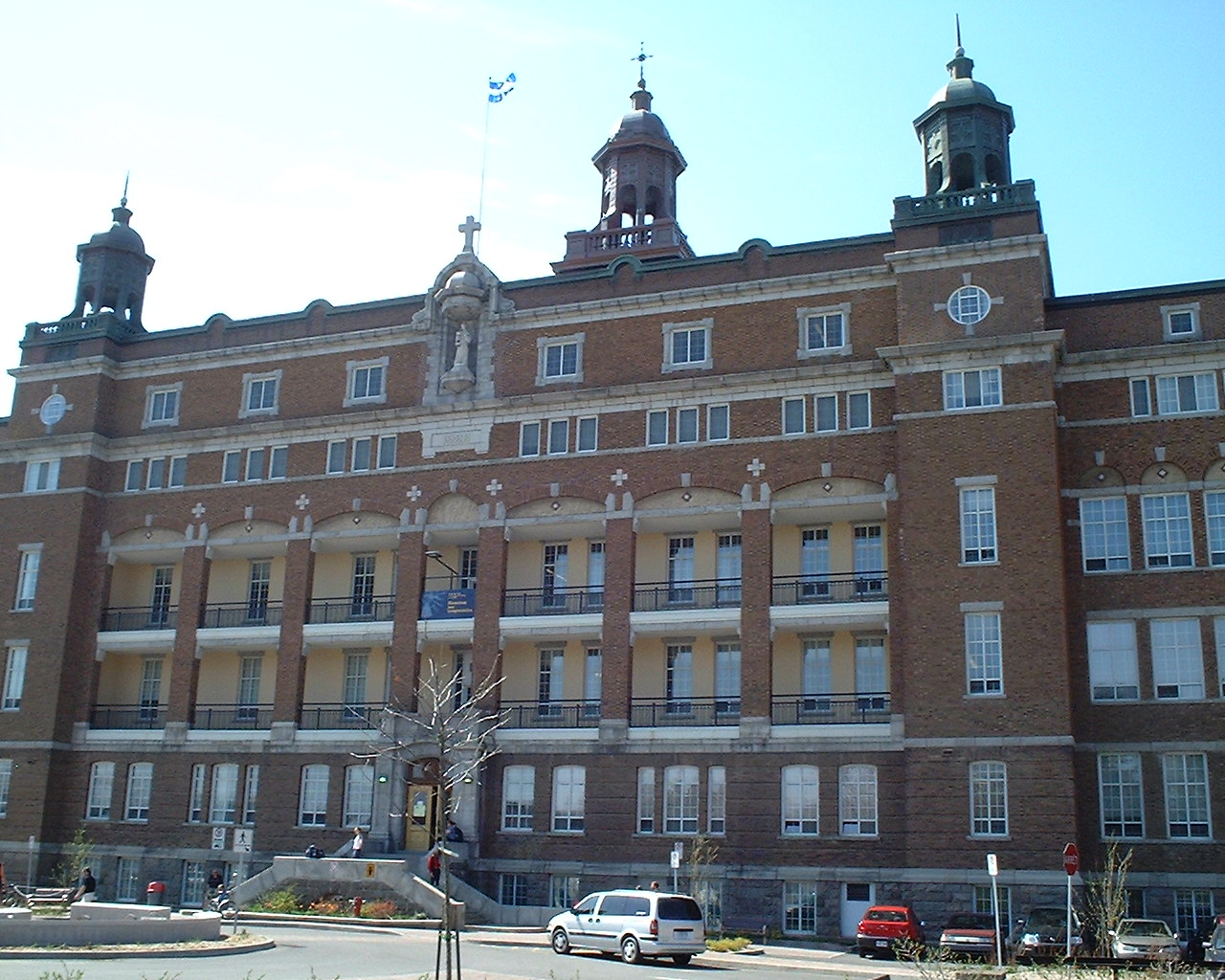
- Motto: Savoir Aimer Vivre Accueil (French)
- Motto in English: Learn Enjoy Live Achieve
- Type: Public CEGEP
- Established: 1968
- Affiliations: non-denominational
- Academic affiliations: ACCC, AUCC
- Location: Rimouski, Quebec, Canada
- Campus: Urban
- Colours: White & gold
- Sporting affiliations: CCAA, QSSF
- Website: www.cegep-rimouski.qc.ca

The Cégep de Rimouski (French pronunciation: [seʒɛp də ʁimuski]) is a post-secondary education institution (cégep: College of General and Professional Education) located in Rimouski, Quebec, Canada.

== History ==
The college traces its origins to the merger of several institutions which became public ones in 1967, when the Quebec system of CEGEPs was created.

== Programs ==
Quebec students complete one fewer grade than all other Canadian provinces in total before attending CEGEP, by ending high school in grade 11 instead of grade 12. CEGEPs then prepare students for university or to enter a technical profession. It is also possible to attend a university with a 3-year technical CEGEP diploma.

The Province of Quebec awards a Diploma of Collegial Studies for two types of programs: two years of pre-university studies or three years of vocational (technical) studies. The pre-university programs, which take two years to complete, cover the subject matters which roughly correspond to the additional year of high school given elsewhere in Canada in preparation for a chosen field in university. The technical programs, which take three-years to complete, applies to students who wish to pursue a skilled trade.

== See also ==
- List of colleges in Quebec
- Higher education in Quebec
