= Baie de l'Isle-Verte =

Coastal wetland in Quebec, Canada

Coordinates: 48°01′N 069°20′W

Designations

Ramsar Wetland
- Official name: Baie de l'Isle-Verte
- Designated: 27 May 1987
- Reference no.: 362

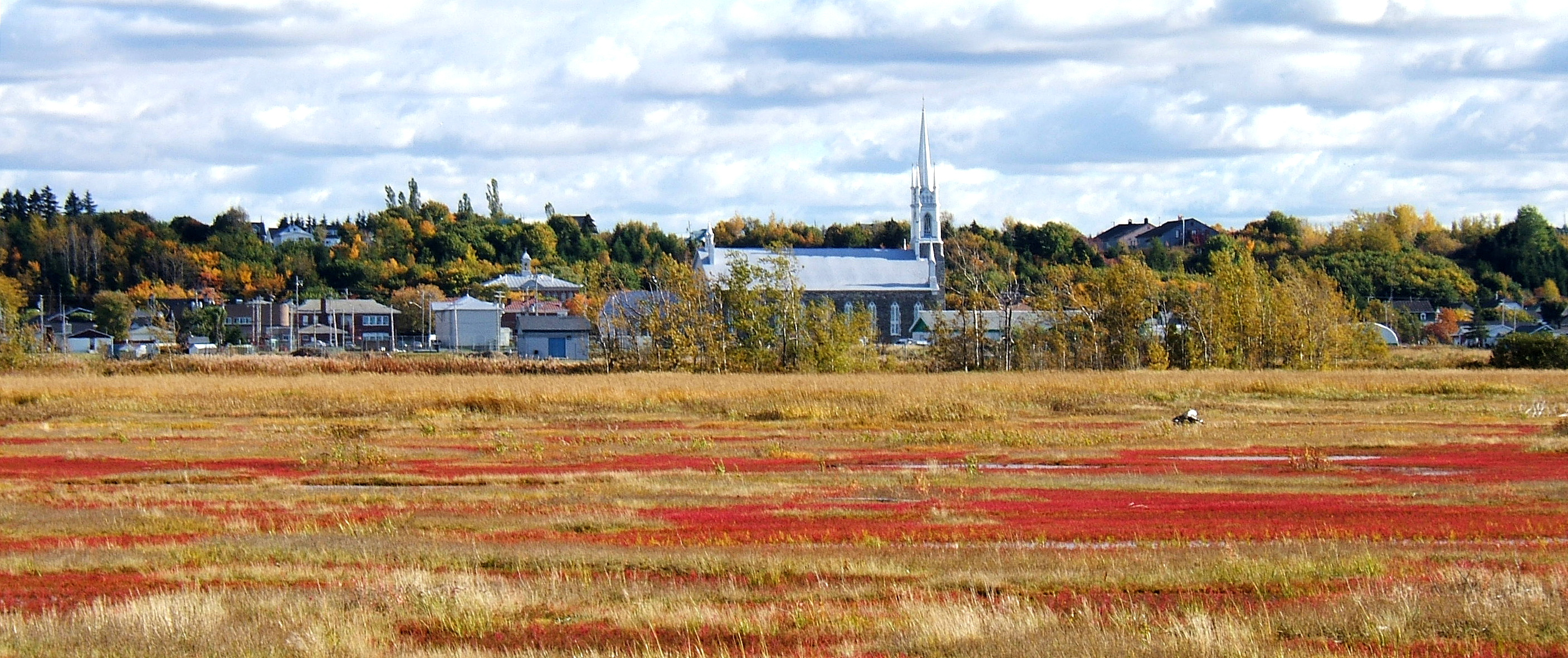
The marshes of Baie de l'Isle-Verte, with the village of L'Isle-Verte in the background.

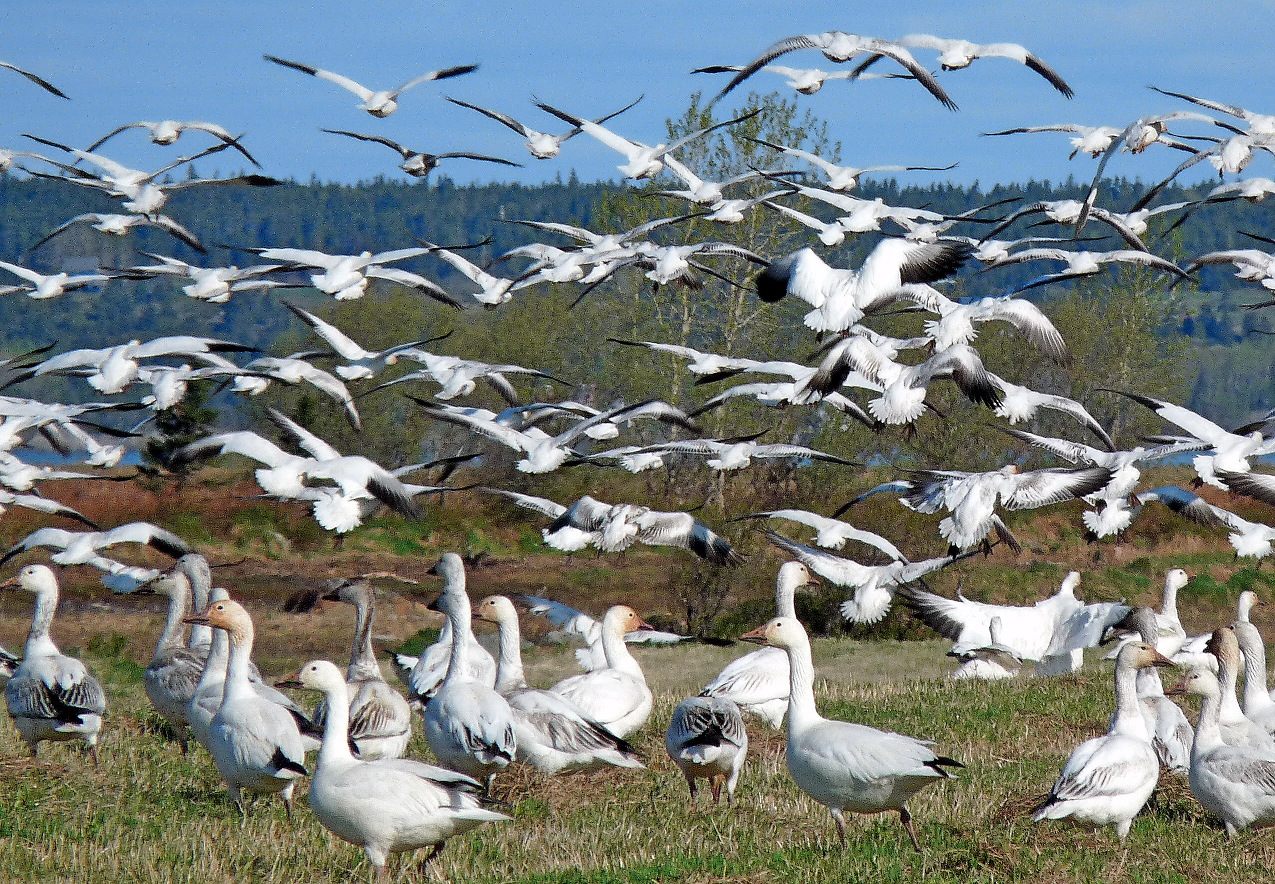
Snow geese in Baie de l'Isle-Verte

Baie de l'Isle-Verte (French for "Green Island Bay") is a 22.2 square kilometres (8.6 sq mi) coastal wetland along the southern shore of the Saint Lawrence River in Quebec, Canada. It was designated a Ramsar wetland of international importance on May 27, 1987, is classified as a globally significant Important Bird Area, and contains a National Wildlife Area and Migratory Bird Sanctuary. It is located in the Rivière-du-Loup Regional County Municipality, in the municipality of L'Isle-Verte.

Within the wetland is a 797 hectare area managed by the Canadian Wildlife Service, of which 406 hectares was designated a National Wildlife Area in 1980. This was created to protect the spartina marshes, which intertidal zone is an important breeding area for the American black duck and other migratory Anatidae. It also consists of recreational facilities including hiking trails and observation towers, as well as exhibits on peatlands and tidal marshes at the Maison Girard Interpretation Centre, and summer school programmes.
