= Le Bic =

Coordinates: 48.375°N 68.703°W

Location of Le Bic in Quebec

Le Bic (French pronunciation: [lə bik]) is a former municipality in Quebec, Canada.

On September 16, 2009, it was merged into the City of Rimouski.

== See also ==
- Bic National Park, near Le Bic
