= Eastern Shores School Board =

School board in Quebec, Canada

Address
- 40, rue Montsorrel C.P. 500 New Carlisle, Quebec, G0C 1Z0; Canada
- Coordinates: 48.007956°N 65.332088°W

District information
- Type: Public
- Motto: Believe, Achieve, Succeed
- Grades: K-11
- Established: 1988

Students and staff
- Enrollment: 1 289 (September 30, 2010)
- Staff: 160 teachers

Other information
- Website: www.essb.qc.ca

Eastern Shores School Board, or ESSB (French: Commission scolaire Eastern Shores) is one of nine anglophone school boards in Quebec. ESSB is the largest anglophone school board in territory but the smallest anglophone school board in student population (1,289 students as of September 30, 2010) in Quebec. ESSB offers public school education in the eastern part of Quebec that includes the Magdalen Islands, Gaspe Coast, North Shore and the town of Fermont (administrative regions 01, 09 (section) and 11).

The school board's chief administrative officer is its Director General. The administrative body of the school board is the Council of Commissioners and is made up of the chairperson, eleven commissioners representing various wards within the school board's territory, and two non-voting parent representatives. The Council sets school board policy and gives the board its political direction. The public meetings are usually held the 15th of every second month during the day at the school board's administrative offices located at 40 rue Montsorrel, New Carlisle, Quebec. Members of the Council are elected every four years. The next election is expected to take place in late 2011.

== History ==
In July 1971, the creation of the Regional School Board of Gaspesia amalgamated many of the small municipalities in the Gaspe Coast. In 1992, the Gaspesia-The Islands School Board was created that extended the existing territory plus the Magdalen Islands. On July 1, 1998, the creation of linguistic school boards in Quebec resulted in the amalgamation of all English language schools in the eastern part of the province and became the present-day territory of ESSB which includes region 01 Bas-Saint-Laurent; region 09 Côte-Nord; and region 11 La Gaspésie-Îles-de-la-Madeleine.

== Eastern Shores School Board Council of Commissioners ==
Ward	Electoral Division	Commissioner
Chairperson		Wade Gifford
1	Baie Comeau to Godbout / Fermont	Mary Ellen Beaulieu
2	Port Cartier / Seven Islands	Mederic O'Brien
3	Nouvelle / Escuminac / Cross Point / Matapedia to Rimouski / Metis Beach	Julie McWhirter
4	Cascapedia-St-Jules / Maria / New Richmond / Gesgapegiag / Carleton-Sur-Mer	France Bujold
5	New Carlisle, from West of Oriental Street / Bonaventure / St-Elzéar / St-Siméon / Caplan / St-Alphonse	Kenneth Ward
6	Part of Port-Daniel-Gasçons / Shigawake / Hopetown /St. Godefroi / Hope / Paspébiac / East of Oriental Street, New Carlisle	George Hayes
7	Ste-Therese / Part of Port-Daniel-Gascons	Douglas Hunt
8	Part of the Town of Gaspe	Donald Bourgoin
9	Murdochville / Part of the Town of Gaspe	Ronald Mundle
10	Magdalen Islands	Kerry Dickson
Parent Commissioner		Kathy MacKenzie
Parent Commissioner		Rhonda Stewart
Parent Commissioner		Jackie Bizeau
Parent Commissioner		Maude Ouellet

== Eastern Shores School Board Director Generals ==
1. Cyrus Journeau (1998–2003)
2. Dr. Christian Fagueret (2003–2004)
3. Stuart Richards (2004)
4. Nicole Cosgrove, Interim Director General (2004–2005)
5. Donna Bisson (2005–2007)
6. Nicole Cosgrove, Interim Director General (2007–2009)
7. Dave Royal (2009–2012)
8. Howard Miller (2012–2018)
9. Natascha Joncas (2018-2019)
10. Hugh Wood (2019–present)

== List of ESSB Schools ==
=== K-11 schools ===
- Baie Comeau High School (pre k - sec 5)
- Belle Anse School (pre k - grade 6)
- Escuminac Intermediate School (pre k - sec 5)
- Evergreen High School (sec 1 - 5)
- Fermont School (pre k - grade 6)
- Flemming Elementary School (pre k - grade 6)
- Gaspe Elementary School (pre k - grade 6)
- C.E. Pouliot (a.k.a. Gaspe Polyvalente) (sec 1 - 5)
- Grosse Isle High School (pre k - sec 5)
- Metis Beach School (pre k - sec 5)
- New Carlisle High School (pre k - sec 2)
- New Richmond High School (pre k - sec 2)
- Queen Elizabeth High School (sec 1 - 5)
- Riverview School (pre k - sec 3)
- Shigawake-Port Daniel School (pre k - grade 6)
- St. Joseph/St. Patrick School (pre k - grade 6)

=== Adult Education and Technical & Vocational Centres ===
- ANCHOR Adult Education Centre
- Grosse Isle Adult Education Centre
- Listuguj Adult Education Centre
- New Richmond/Maria Adult Education Centre
- Northern Lights Adult Education Centre
- Wakeham Adult Education Centre

== Controversies ==
Enrollment in the Eastern Shores School Board's schools and centres continues to decline as it does in most anglophone public school boards in Quebec. This is a part of an ongoing decline which began with the enactment of the Charter of the French Language (Bill 101) by René Lévesque's Parti Québécois government in 1977. Entry Island is the school board's smallest school with less than a dozen students.

On June 16, 2010, the ESSB Council of Commissioners voted to recommend "that Bonaventure Polyvalente School (BPS) students be returned to their respective communities..." Although BPS is the largest school in the school board's territory with 143 students (as of September 30, 2010), the school board proposed to return the students to their "feeder schools" (i.e. New Richmond High School and New Carlisle High School) due to declining student population. The closure of BPS would result in students remaining in their respective communities until the end of high school (i.e. secondary 5). According to article 212 of the Education Act, there must be a two-year consultation before a is closed; however, ESSB decided to close the school at the end of a three-year period so that BPS will close in June 2014 to anglophone students.

On March 20, 2013, the ESSB Council of Commissioners voted to recommend the closure of Entry Island School. The school, located on Entry Island off the east coast of the Magdalen Islands, was constructed in 1963 and offers instruction from pre-kindergarten to secondary II. During the 2012-2013 school year, there were two teachers and four students in the school and the projected enrolment is declining.
