= Chemin du Portage =

Historic route in Quebec, Canada

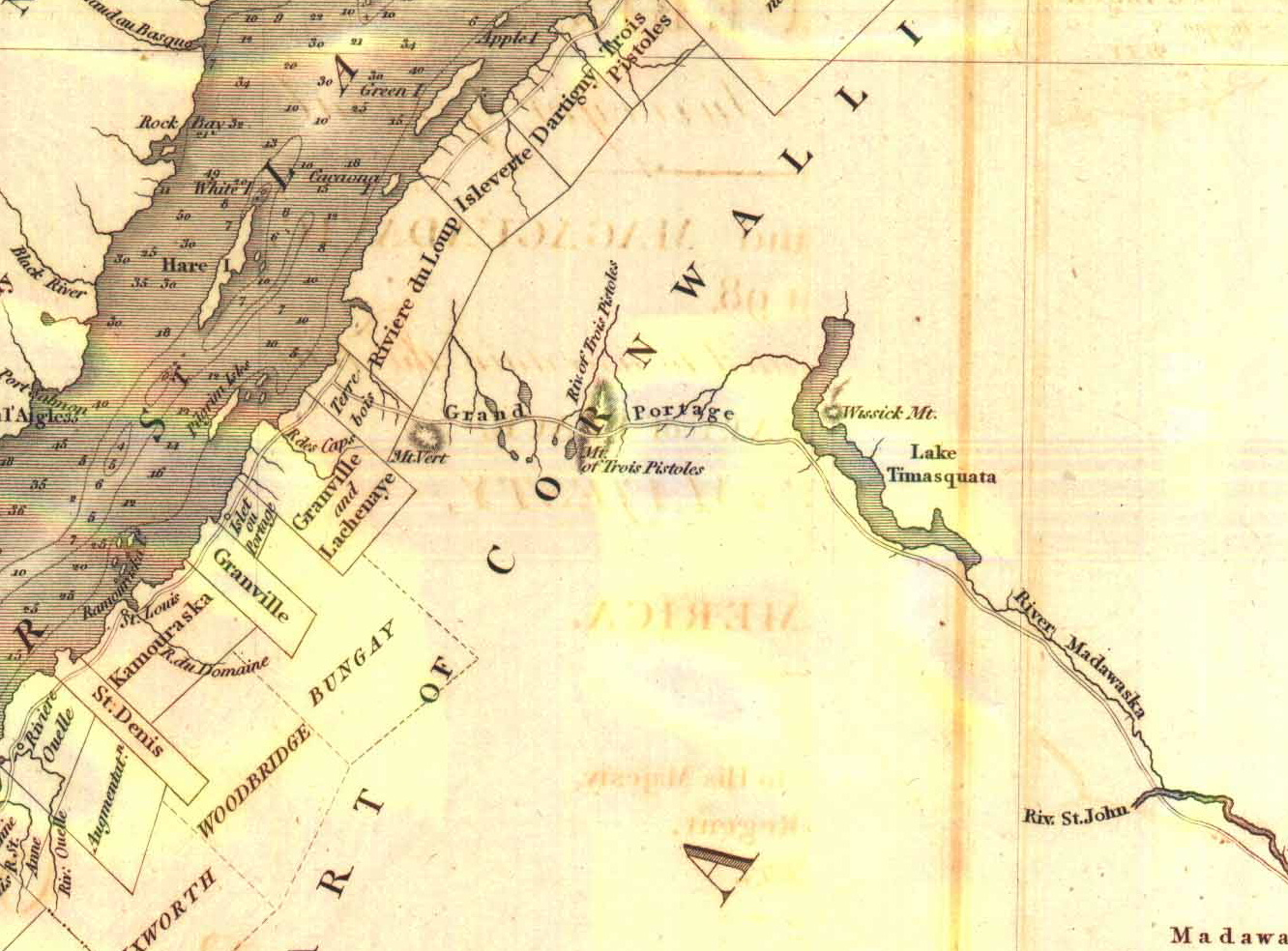
The Chemin du Portage in 1813, according to a map by surveyor Samuel Holland

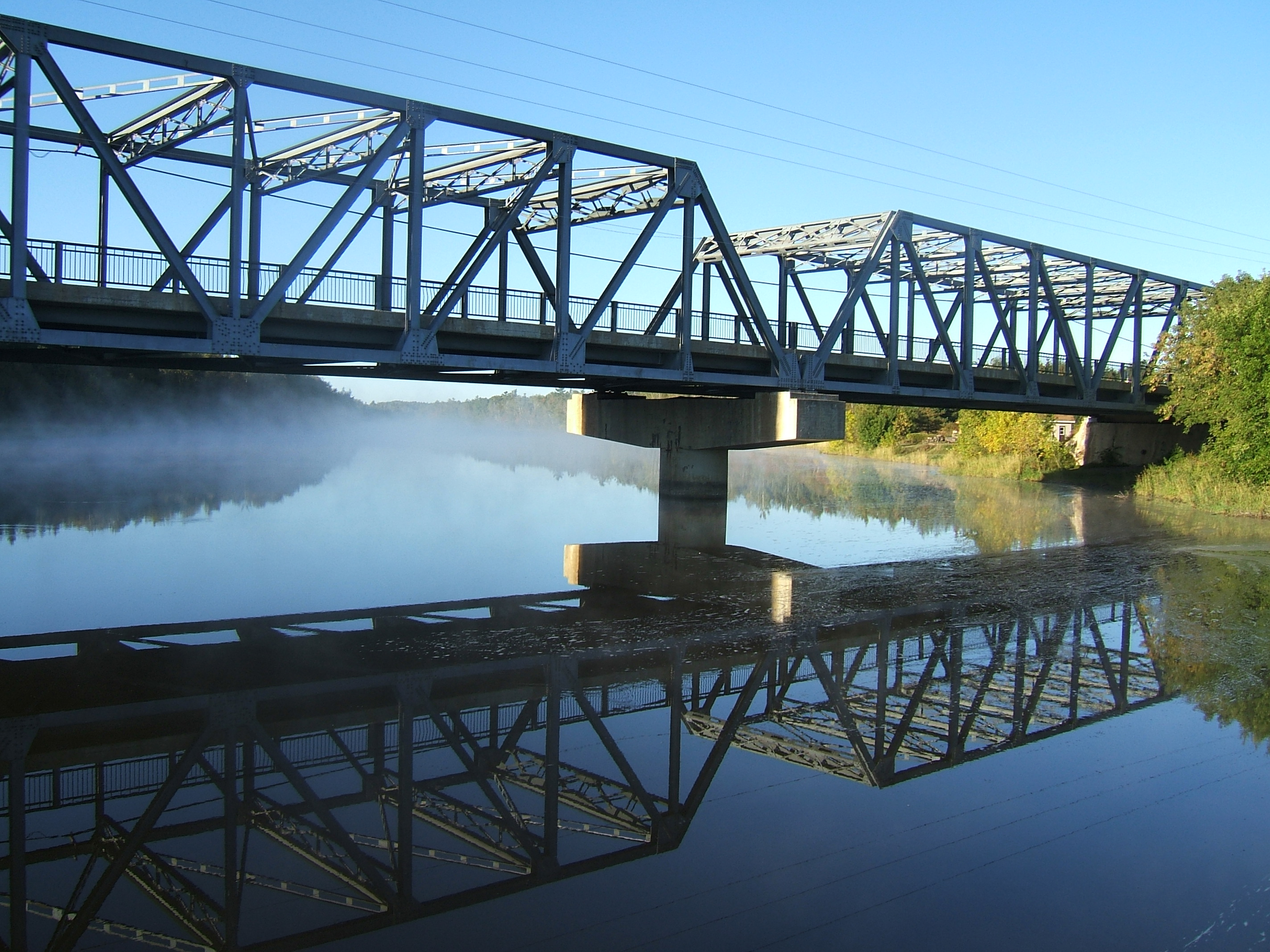
Bridge of the chemin du Lac on the rivière du Loup, at Saint-Antonin. The chemin du Lac follows the route of the original chemin du Portage of 1783.

The Chemin du Portage is a historic route in Quebec, Canada, between the St. Lawrence River valley and Acadia. Literally translating as the portage road or path, it was first used for portage by indigenous peoples of the Americas and later as a strategic road by French and British colonists. It was upgraded into Quebec Route 185 and Quebec Autoroute 85, and forms part of the Trans-Canada Highway.

The government of Québec maintains a small museum to the Chemin du Portage in a former schoolhouse in Notre-Dame-du-Portage.

== History ==
The shortest land route between Acadia and New France was through the region of Temiscouata, where, in 1746, the French administration built a road that allowed access to Lake Temiscouata, from which the Atlantic Ocean could be reached through a network of rivers.

After the conquest of New France by Great Britain, American independence posed a barrier to internal connections between the British possessions, calling for the construction of a route between Canada and the Atlantic provinces. In 1783, the British administration opened, between what is now Notre-Dame-du-Portage and Cabano, a road that, for almost 80 years, was used mainly by mail carriers and troops. Designated as the "chemin du Portage", the road was long and passed through uneven ground. At the beginning of the 19th century, soldiers performed maintenance work on the road, but the task was immense. When tensions arose with the United States in 1839–1840, the British administration established military camps at Degelis and Cabano, where the soldiers built Fort Ingall to protect the entrance of the strategic route. The determination of the British to preserve the route prevailed, as evidenced by the Webster-Ashburton Treaty signed in 1842.

From 1856 to 1862, a new route was laid out starting from Rivière-du-Loup, helping it to become the principal city of the region. The old route was abandoned and later disappeared.

== External link ==
- Le centre d'interprétation du chemin du portage video of the museum website
