= Saint-Eugène-de-Ladrière =

- Parish municipality
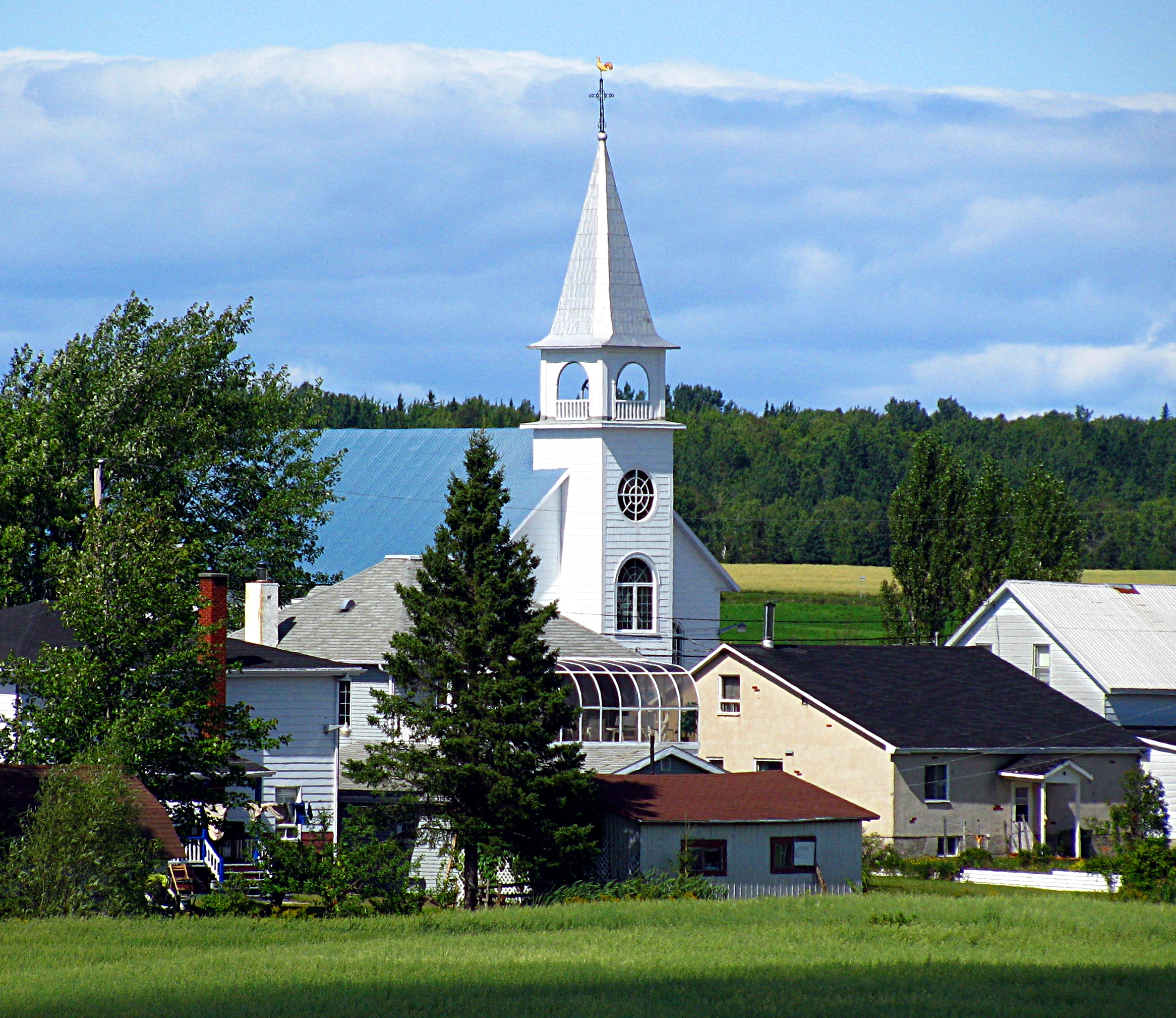

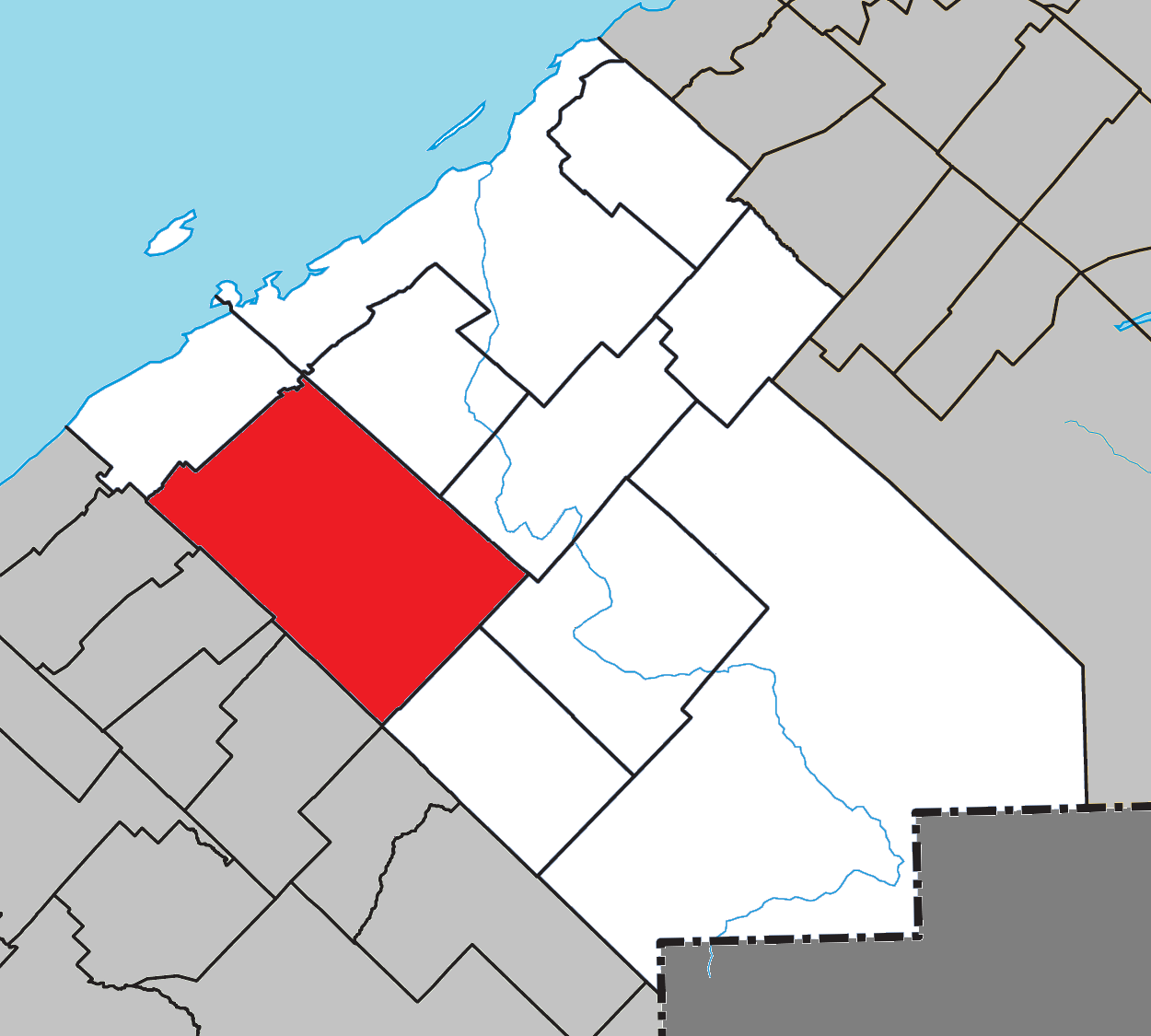
- Location within Rimouski-Neigette RCM

- Location in eastern Quebec
- Coordinates: 48.25°N 68.8°W
- Country: Canada
- Province: Quebec
- Region: Bas-Saint-Laurent
- RCM: Rimouski-Neigette
- Constituted: January 1, 1962

Government
  - Mayor: Claude Viel
  - Federal riding: Rimouski-Neigette—Mitis—Matapédia—Les Basques
  - Prov. riding: Rimouski

Area
  - Total: 354.30 km^{2} (136.80 sq mi)
  - Land: 331.36 km^{2} (127.94 sq mi)

Population (2021)
  - Total: 413
  - Density: 1.2/km^{2} (3.1/sq mi)
  - Pop 2016-2021: ▲9.3%
  - Dwellings: 190
- Time zone: UTC−5 (EST)
  - Summer (DST): UTC−4 (EDT)
- Postal code(s): G0L 1P0
- Area codes: 418 and 581
- Highways: No major routes
- Website: www.municipalite.saint-eugene-de-ladriere.qc.ca

Saint-Eugène-de-Ladrière (French pronunciation: [sɛ̃t‿øʒɛn də ladʁijɛʁ]) is a parish municipality in the Rimouski-Neigette Regional County Municipality in the Bas-Saint-Laurent region of Quebec, Canada.

On July 6, 2002, unorganized territory Grand-Lac-Touradi was annexed by Saint-Eugène-de-Ladrière.

== History ==
The area has been inhabited since 1860. At the time, the territory was part of Saint-Fabien.

In 1930, the mission of Saint-Eugène-de-Ladrière was established. The parish registers were opened on 30 January 1938. The first resident minister was Laurent Lavoie from 1942 to 1951.

The first parish priest was Oscar Thibeault from 1959 to 1968. The parish was canonically erected on 17 April 1962 and civilly erected the following 6 September. The municipality of Saint-Eugène-de-Ladrière was therefore created the same year by splitting from Saint-Fabien.

== Geography ==
Saint-Eugène-de-Ladrière is located 35 km southwest of Rimouski and 40 km from Saint-Anaclet-de-Lessard.

== Demographics ==
In the 2021 Census of Population conducted by Statistics Canada, Saint-Eugène-de-Ladrière had a population of 413 living in 183 of its 190 total private dwellings, a change of 9.3% from its 2016 population of 378. With a land area of 331.36 km^{2} (127.94 sq mi), it had a population density of 1.2/km^{2} (3.2/sq mi) in 2021.

Historical census populations – Saint-Eugène-de-Ladrière

Year	Pop.	±%
1966	622	—
1971	636	+2.3%
1976	595	−6.4%
1981	600	+0.8%
1986	561	−6.5%
1991	512	−8.7%

Year	Pop.	±%
1996	479	−6.4%
2001	474	−1.0%
2006	441	−7.0%
2011	421	−4.5%
2016	378	−10.2%
2021	413	+9.3%

Source: Statistics Canada

== See also ==
- List of parish municipalities in Quebec
