= Sainte-Irène =

- Parish municipality
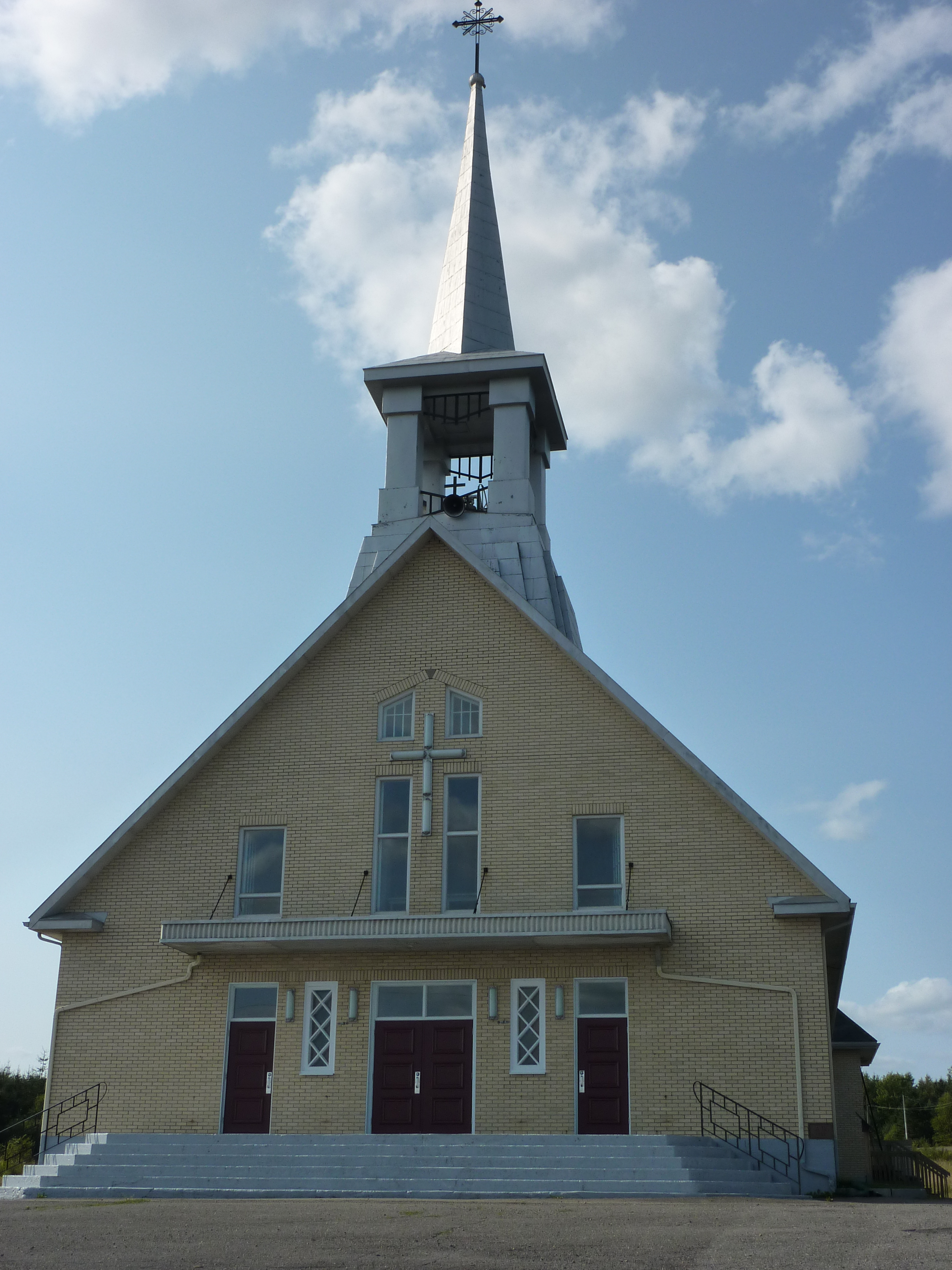
- Church of Sainte-Irène
- Motto: Où le vent tourne à nos espérances
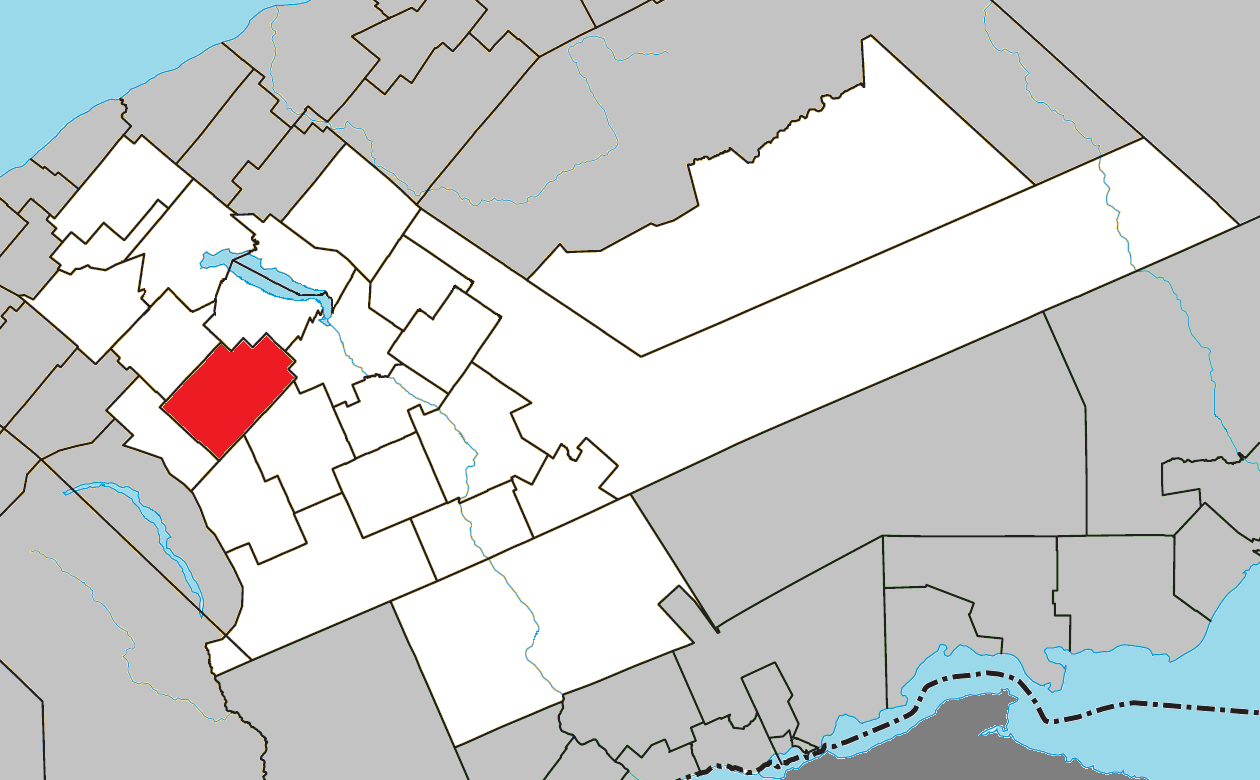
- Location within La Matapédia RCM

- Location in eastern Quebec
- Coordinates: 48°26′N 67°36′W
- Country: Canada
- Province: Quebec
- Region: Bas-Saint-Laurent
- RCM: La Matapédia
- Settled: c. 1930
- Constituted: January 1, 1953

Government
  - Mayor: Nelson Thériault
  - Fed. riding: Rimouski-Neigette—Mitis—Matapédia—Les Basques
  - Prov. riding: Matane-Matapédia-Mitis

Area
  - Total: 136.43 km^{2} (52.68 sq mi)
  - Land: 135.09 km^{2} (52.16 sq mi)

Population (2021)
  - Total: 369
  - Density: 2.7/km^{2} (7.0/sq mi)
  - Change 2016-21: ▲12.8%
  - Dwellings: 246
- Time zone: UTC−5 (EST)
  - Summer (DST): UTC−4 (EDT)
- Postal code(s): G0J 2P0
- Area codes: 418 and 581
- Highways: No major routes
- Website: www.steirene.com

Sainte-Irène (French pronunciation: [sɛ̃t iʁɛn]) is a parish municipality of more than 300 habitants in Quebec, Canada, located in the Matapedia Valley of the Bas-Saint-Laurent region.

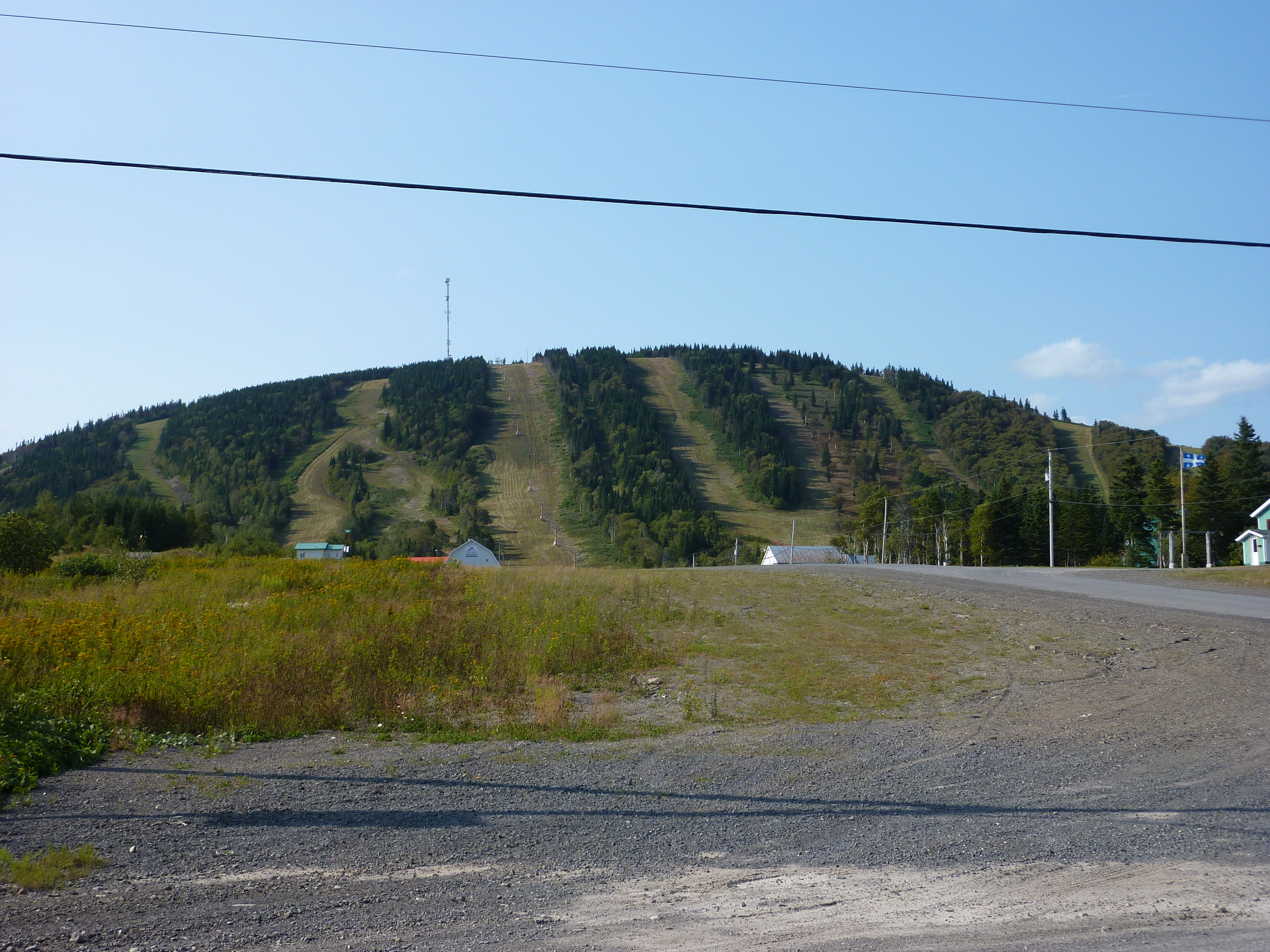
Val-d'Irène regional park in September 2009

== Demographics ==
In the 2021 Census of Population conducted by Statistics Canada, Sainte-Irène had a population of 369 living in 174 of its 246 total private dwellings, a change of 12.8% from its 2016 population of 327. With a land area of 135.09 km^{2} (52.16 sq mi), it had a population density of 2.7/km^{2} (7.1/sq mi) in 2021.

Canada census – Sainte-Irène community profile

	2021	2016	2011
Population	369 (12.8% from 2016)	327 (-4.1% from 2011)	341 (-2.6% from 2006)
Land area	135.09 km^{2} (52.16 sq mi)	135.25 km^{2} (52.22 sq mi)	136.56 km^{2} (52.73 sq mi)
Population density	2.7/km^{2} (7.0/sq mi)	2.4/km^{2} (6.2/sq mi)	2.5/km^{2} (6.5/sq mi)
Median age	45.6 (M: 45.6, F: 46.0)	46.9 (M: 48.8, F: 46.1)	47.6 (M: 49.2, F: 43.5)
Private dwellings	246 (total) 174 (occupied)	259 (total)	233 (total)
Median household income	$71,000	$53,675	$68,040

References: 2021 2016 2011

Historical census populations – Sainte-Irène

Year	Pop.	±%
1956	1,102	—
1961	955	−13.3%
1966	748	−21.7%
1971	549	−26.6%
1976	396	−27.9%
1981	351	−11.4%
1986	343	−2.3%

Year	Pop.	±%
1991	363	+5.8%
1996	352	−3.0%
2001	323	−8.2%
2006	350	+8.4%
2011	341	−2.6%
2016	327	−4.1%
2021	369	+12.8%

Source: Statistics Canada

== Government ==
=== Municipal council ===
- Mayor: Nelson Thériault
- Councillors: Guy Dupont, Carl-Michaël Lévesque Lemelin, Olivier Lavoie, Nancy Lizotte, Alain Delisle, Emma Carpinteri

=== Political representation ===
Federally, Sainte-Irène is part of the federal riding of Rimouski-Neigette—Mitis—Matapédia—Les Basques (named Rimouski—La Matapédia between 2025 to 2026). In the 2025 Canadian federal election, the incumbent Maxime Blanchette-Joncas of the Bloc Québécois was re-elected and began to represent the population Sainte-Irène in the House of Commons of Canada after the electoral district of Avignon—La Mitis—Matane—Matapédia was abolished.

Sainte-Irène federal election results
Year	Liberal		Conservative		Bloc Québécois		New Democratic		Green	
2021	7%	15	9%	18	75%	148	4%	7	0%	0
2019	24%	41	9%	15	62%	110	2%	4	2%	3
2015	36%	43	7%	8	30%	36	16%	19	1%	1
2011	23%	34	10%	14	40%	58	26%	38	1%	2
2008	32%	44	11%	15	48%	66	4%	6	5%	7
2006	10%	13	21%	26	54%	68	8%	10	6%	8
2004	28%	34	3%	4	63%	75	4%	5	2%	2

Provincially it is part of the riding of Matane-Matapédia-Mitis. In the 2026 Quebec general election the incumbent MNA Pascal Bérubé, of the Parti Québécois, was re-elected to represent the population of Sainte-Irène in the National Assembly of Quebec.

Sainte-Irène provincial election results
Year	CAQ		Liberal		QC solidaire		Parti Québécois	
2022	14%	23	0%	0	5%	8	72%	115
2018	12%	24	8%	15	6%	12	72%	140
2014	11%	20	16%	29	10%	18	64%	117
2012	28%	39	13%	18	6%	8	54%	76

== See also ==
- List of parish municipalities in Quebec
