= List of parish municipalities in Quebec =

This is a list of municipalities that have the Quebec municipal type of parish municipality (paroisse, code=P), an administrative division defined by the Ministry of Municipal Affairs, Regions and Land Occupancy.

The Commission de toponymie du Québec describes a parish municipality (municipalité de paroisse) as "the territory of a parish (in the religious sense) established as a municipality" . Many of these remain from the days in which the Catholic Church served as an effective governmental structure in areas without established secular municipal government.

In most cases, these are rural, sparsely inhabited areas; in a few cases (such as Notre-Dame-des-Anges and Saint-Louis-de-Gonzague-du-Cap-Tourmente), they are divisions created originally to give special municipal independence to certain church installations.

== Parish municipalities ==
Name	RCM	Region
Brébeuf	Les Laurentides	Laurentides
Disraeli	Les Appalaches	Chaudière-Appalaches
Hérouxville	Mékinac	Mauricie
Lac-aux-Sables	Mékinac	Mauricie
La Doré	Le Domaine-du-Roy	Saguenay–Lac-Saint-Jean
La Durantaye	Bellechasse	Chaudière-Appalaches
La Rédemption	La Mitis	Bas-Saint-Laurent
L'Ascension-de-Notre-Seigneur	Lac-Saint-Jean-Est	Saguenay–Lac-Saint-Jean
La Trinité-des-Monts	Rimouski-Neigette	Bas-Saint-Laurent
Notre-Dame-Auxiliatrice-de-Buckland	Bellechasse	Chaudière-Appalaches
Notre-Dame-de-Lourdes	L'Érable	Centre-du-Québec
Notre-Dame-des-Anges	none	Capitale-Nationale
Notre-Dame-des-Pins	Beauce-Sartigan	Chaudière-Appalaches
Notre-Dame-des-Sept-Douleurs	Rivière-du-Loup	Bas-Saint-Laurent
Notre-Dame-du-Bon-Conseil	Drummond	Centre-du-Québec
Notre-Dame-du-Mont-Carmel	Les Chenaux	Mauricie
Notre-Dame-du-Sacré-Cœur-d'Issoudun	Lotbinière	Chaudière-Appalaches
Packington	Témiscouata	Bas-Saint-Laurent
Parisville	Bécancour	Centre-du-Québec
Plessisville	L'Érable	Centre-du-Québec
Ragueneau	Manicouagan	Côte-Nord
Sacré-Cœur-de-Jésus	Les Appalaches	Chaudière-Appalaches
Saint-Adelme	La Matanie	Bas-Saint-Laurent
Saint-Adelphe	Mékinac	Mauricie
Saint-Alexandre-des-Lacs	La Matapédia	Bas-Saint-Laurent
Saint-Alexis-des-Monts	Maskinongé	Mauricie
Saint-Anaclet-de-Lessard	Rimouski-Neigette	Bas-Saint-Laurent
Saint-Antoine-de-l'Isle-aux-Grues	Montmagny	Chaudière-Appalaches
Saint-Arsène	Rivière-du-Loup	Bas-Saint-Laurent
Saint-Augustin	Maria-Chapdelaine	Saguenay–Lac-Saint-Jean
Saint-Augustin-de-Woburn	Le Granit	Estrie
Saint-Barnabé	Maskinongé	Mauricie
Saint-Barthélemy	D'Autray	Lanaudière
Saint-Camille-de-Lellis	Les Etchemins	Chaudière-Appalaches
Saint-Charles-Garnier	La Mitis	Bas-Saint-Laurent
Saint-Christophe-d'Arthabaska	Arthabaska	Centre-du-Québec
Saint-Clément	Les Basques	Bas-Saint-Laurent
Saint-Cléophas	La Matapédia	Bas-Saint-Laurent
Saint-Cyprien	Les Etchemins	Chaudière-Appalaches
Saint-Cyrille-de-Lessard	L'Islet	Chaudière-Appalaches
Saint-Damase	La Matapédia	Bas-Saint-Laurent
Saint-Damien	Matawinie	Lanaudière
Saint-Damien-de-Buckland	Bellechasse	Chaudière-Appalaches
Saint-Didace	D'Autray	Lanaudière
Saint-Donat	La Mitis	Bas-Saint-Laurent
Saint-Edmond-de-Grantham	Drummond	Centre-du-Québec
Saint-Édouard-de-Fabre	Témiscamingue	Abitibi-Témiscamingue
Saint-Édouard-de-Lotbinière	Lotbinière	Chaudière-Appalaches
Saint-Éloi	Les Basques	Bas-Saint-Laurent
Saint-Elphège	Nicolet-Yamaska	Centre-du-Québec
Saint-Étienne-des-Grès	Maskinongé	Mauricie
Saint-Eugène-de-Ladrière	Rimouski-Neigette	Bas-Saint-Laurent
Saint-Eusèbe	Témiscouata	Bas-Saint-Laurent
Saint-Fabien	Rimouski-Neigette	Bas-Saint-Laurent
Saint-Fabien-de-Panet	Montmagny	Chaudière-Appalaches
Saint-Frédéric	Beauce-Centre	Chaudière-Appalaches
Saint-Gérard-Majella	Pierre-De Saurel	Montérégie
Saint-Germain-de-Kamouraska	Kamouraska	Bas-Saint-Laurent
Saint-Gilbert	Portneuf	Capitale-Nationale
Saint-Hilaire-de-Dorset	Beauce-Sartigan	Chaudière-Appalaches
Saint-Hilarion	Charlevoix	Capitale-Nationale
Saint-Isidore	Roussillon	Montérégie
Saint-Jacques-le-Majeur-de-Wolfestown	Les Appalaches	Chaudière-Appalaches
Saint-Jean-de-Cherbourg	La Matanie	Bas-Saint-Laurent
Saint-Joachim	La Côte-de-Beaupré	Capitale-Nationale
Saint-Joseph-de-Kamouraska	Kamouraska	Bas-Saint-Laurent
Saint-Joseph-de-Lepage	La Mitis	Bas-Saint-Laurent
Saint-Jules	Beauce-Centre	Chaudière-Appalaches
Saint-Lambert	Abitibi-Ouest	Abitibi-Témiscamingue
Saint-Léandre	La Matanie	Bas-Saint-Laurent
Saint-Léon-de-Standon	Bellechasse	Chaudière-Appalaches
Saint-Léon-le-Grand	Maskinongé	Mauricie
Saint-Léon-le-Grand	La Matapédia	Bas-Saint-Laurent
Saint-Louis-de-Gonzague	Beauharnois-Salaberry	Montérégie
Saint-Louis-de-Gonzague-du-Cap-Tourmente	La Côte-de-Beaupré	Capitale-Nationale
Saint-Louis-du-Ha! Ha!	Témiscouata	Bas-Saint-Laurent
Saint-Majorique-de-Grantham	Drummond	Centre-du-Québec
Saint-Malachie	Bellechasse	Chaudière-Appalaches
Saint-Marc-de-Figuery	Abitibi	Abitibi-Témiscamingue
Saint-Marc-du-Lac-Long	Témiscouata	Bas-Saint-Laurent
Saint-Marcellin	Rimouski-Neigette	Bas-Saint-Laurent
Saint-Martin	Beauce-Sartigan	Chaudière-Appalaches
Saint-Maurice	Les Chenaux	Mauricie
Saint-Moïse	La Matapédia	Bas-Saint-Laurent
Saint-Narcisse	Les Chenaux	Mauricie
Saint-Narcisse-de-Beaurivage	Lotbinière	Chaudière-Appalaches
Saint-Narcisse-de-Rimouski	Rimouski-Neigette	Bas-Saint-Laurent
Saint-Nazaire-d'Acton	Acton	Montérégie
Saint-Nazaire-de-Dorchester	Bellechasse	Chaudière-Appalaches
Saint-Norbert	D'Autray	Lanaudière
Saint-Octave-de-Métis	La Mitis	Bas-Saint-Laurent
Saint-Odilon-de-Cranbourne	Beauce-Centre	Chaudière-Appalaches
Saint-Philémon	Bellechasse	Chaudière-Appalaches
Saint-Philippe-de-Néri	Kamouraska	Bas-Saint-Laurent
Saint-Pie-de-Guire	Drummond	Centre-du-Québec
Saint-Pierre-Baptiste	L'Érable	Centre-du-Québec
Saint-Pierre-de-la-Rivière-du-Sud	Montmagny	Chaudière-Appalaches
Saint-René	Beauce-Sartigan	Chaudière-Appalaches
Saint-Roch-de-Mékinac	Mékinac	Mauricie
Saint-Rosaire	Arthabaska	Centre-du-Québec
Saint-Sévère	Maskinongé	Mauricie
Saint-Séverin	Beauce-Centre	Chaudière-Appalaches
Saint-Séverin	Mékinac	Mauricie
Saint-Siméon	Bonaventure	Gaspésie–Îles-de-la-Madeleine
Saint-Sulpice	L'Assomption	Lanaudière
Saint-Tharcisius	La Matapédia	Bas-Saint-Laurent
Saint-Thuribe	Portneuf	Capitale-Nationale
Saint-Urbain	Charlevoix	Capitale-Nationale
Saint-Valérien	Rimouski-Neigette	Bas-Saint-Laurent
Saint-Zénon-du-Lac-Humqui	La Matapédia	Bas-Saint-Laurent
Saint-Zéphirin-de-Courval	Nicolet-Yamaska	Centre-du-Québec
Sainte-Anne-de-la-Pocatière	Kamouraska	Bas-Saint-Laurent
Sainte-Anne-de-Sabrevois	Le Haut-Richelieu	Montérégie
Sainte-Anne-des-Lacs	Les Pays-d'en-Haut	Laurentides
Sainte-Apolline-de-Patton	Montmagny	Chaudière-Appalaches
Sainte-Brigitte-des-Saults	Drummond	Centre-du-Québec
Sainte-Cécile-de-Lévrard	Bécancour	Centre-du-Québec
Sainte-Christine	Acton	Montérégie
Sainte-Flavie	La Mitis	Bas-Saint-Laurent
Sainte-Françoise	Les Basques	Bas-Saint-Laurent
Sainte-Geneviève-de-Batiscan	Les Chenaux	Mauricie
Sainte-Hélène-de-Mancebourg	Abitibi-Ouest	Abitibi-Témiscamingue
Sainte-Hénédine	La Nouvelle-Beauce	Chaudière-Appalaches
Sainte-Irène	La Matapédia	Bas-Saint-Laurent
Sainte-Jeanne-d'Arc	La Mitis	Bas-Saint-Laurent
Sainte-Louise	L'Islet	Chaudière-Appalaches
Sainte-Marguerite	La Nouvelle-Beauce	Chaudière-Appalaches
Sainte-Marie-Madeleine	Les Maskoutains	Montérégie
Sainte-Perpétue	Nicolet-Yamaska	Centre-du-Québec
Sainte-Praxède	Les Appalaches	Chaudière-Appalaches
Sainte-Rose-du-Nord	Le Fjord-du-Saguenay	Saguenay–Lac-Saint-Jean
Sainte-Sabine	Les Etchemins	Chaudière-Appalaches
Sainte-Séraphine	Arthabaska	Centre-du-Québec
Sainte-Sophie-de-Lévrard	Bécancour	Centre-du-Québec
Saints-Martyrs-Canadiens	Arthabaska	Centre-du-Québec
Senneterre	La Vallée-de-l'Or	Abitibi-Témiscamingue
Très-Saint-Sacrement	Le Haut-Saint-Laurent	Montérégie
