= Guy Caron =

Canadian politician

His Worship Guy Caron
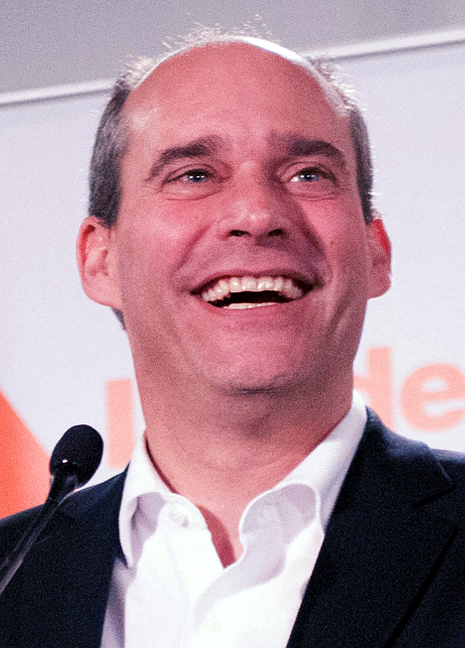
- Caron in 2017

Mayor of Rimouski
- Incumbent
- Assumed office November 15, 2021
- Preceded by: Marc Parent

Parliamentary leader of the New Democratic Party
- In office October 4, 2017 – February 25, 2019
- Leader: Jagmeet Singh
- Preceded by: Tom Mulcair (as leader)
- Succeeded by: Jagmeet Singh (as leader)

Shadow Minister for Natural Resources
- In office January 23, 2015 – November 19, 2015
- Leader: Thomas Mulcair
- Preceded by: Chris Charlton
- Succeeded by: Candice Bergen

Shadow Minister for Industry
- In office November 1, 2011 – April 18, 2012
- Leader: Nycole Turmel
- Preceded by: Peter Julian
- Succeeded by: Hélène LeBlanc

Member of Parliament for Rimouski-Neigette—Témiscouata—Les Basques
- In office May 2, 2011 – September 11, 2019
- Preceded by: Claude Guimond
- Succeeded by: Maxime Blanchette-Joncas

Personal details
- Born: May 13, 1968 (age 58) Rimouski, Quebec
- Party: New Democratic
- Spouse: Valerie Stansfield (m. 2006)
- Children: 2
- Education: University of Ottawa; Université du Québec à Montréal
- Profession: Economist, journalist, public relations officer, researcher

Guy Caron (born May 13, 1968) is a Canadian politician who was elected the mayor of Rimouski, Quebec in 2021 and re-elected in 2025. He was previously a member of the House of Commons of Canada from 2011 to 2019, and served as the federal parliamentary leader of the New Democratic Party from 2017 to 2019, substituting for party leader Jagmeet Singh who during this time did not hold a seat.

Caron was elected to the House of Commons of Canada in the 2011 election. He represented the electoral district of Rimouski-Neigette—Témiscouata—Les Basques as a member of the New Democratic Party (NDP). He was the NDP's critic for Finance and the Atlantic Canada Opportunities Agency, but resigned from the NDP's shadow cabinet in February 2017 to pursue leadership of the New Democratic Party of Canada.

On October 4, 2017, Jagmeet Singh, the newly elected NDP leader, appointed Caron to serve as the NDP's parliamentary leader. He relinquished this position on February 25, 2019, upon Singh's election to parliament from the riding of Burnaby South. Caron lost his seat in the 2019 Canadian federal election.

== Early life and career ==
Caron was born in Rimouski, Quebec. He has a bachelor's degree in communications from the University of Ottawa in 1992, and served two terms as president of their student federation in 1992–1994. He was vice-president of the board of directors of Voyages Campus/Travel Cuts, 1994. He was national president of the Canadian Federation of Students for two terms in 1994–1996. He also has a master's degree in economics from Université du Québec à Montréal in 2001.

Prior to being elected, Caron was a researcher and economist with the Communications, Energy and Paperworkers Union of Canada, most recently as Director of Special Projects. He previously worked for the Council of Canadians where he was a media relations officer, then the Campaigner on Canada-U.S. Relations, and then the Healthcare Campaigner. He has also worked for the Canadian Race Relations Foundation. He is also a former journalist: he worked with radio stations CKLE and CKMN-FM, and with the newspapers Progrès-Écho and Rimouskois while studying science at the Cégep de Rimouski.

He is the author of Crossing the Line: A Citizens’ Inquiry on Canada-U.S. Relations.

== Political career ==
Caron ran in Rimouski-Neigette—Témiscouata—Les Basques as the NDP candidate in 2004, 2006 and 2008, each time finishing a distant fourth. In 2011, however, he defeated Bloc Québecois incumbent Claude Guimond as part of the large NDP wave that swept through Quebec. He was appointed chairperson of the NDP's Quebec caucus following the election.

After the 2015 election, Caron was appointed the NDP critic for Finance, the Atlantic Canada Opportunities Agency, as well as deputy critic for Fisheries, Oceans, and the Canadian Coast Guard in the 42nd Canadian Parliament.

Caron resigned from the NDP shadow cabinet in February 2017 to stand for the leadership of the New Democratic Party to succeed Tom Mulcair. Caron stated that the two major challenges confronting Canadians are income inequality and climate change. His leadership platform included a guaranteed basic income. In the October 1, 2017, election, Caron placed fourth with 9.4% of the vote, with Jagmeet Singh winning on the first ballot. The other two contestants in the leadership election, MPs Charlie Angus and Niki Ashton, came second and third respectively. Caron lost his seat in the 2019 Canadian federal election.

In November 2020, Caron announced his campaign for Mayor of Rimouski in the following year's municipal election, hoping to succeed retiring Mayor Marc Parent. He won the election on November 7, 2021.

== Political positions ==
=== Tax policy ===
Caron released a tax plan called Making Taxes Work for Canadians as part of his ongoing NDP leadership bid. The plan proposes the creation of a Tax Crimes Division within the Department of Justice Canada, in order to provide a more robust method of preventing tax evasion. In addition, the tax plan proposes a Financial Activities Tax to tax the profits of financial institutions and the remuneration packages of banking executives. Caron's plan also proposes the elimination of the "CEO stock option loophole," a promise made by the Liberal Party of Canada in the 2015 federal election.

=== Basic income ===
Caron's bid for the NDP leadership also included a plan for basic income for individuals or families who spend at least 20% more of their income than the average on necessities such as food, shelter, and clothing (designated as the low-income cut-off line). The basic income program would be joined with the Canada Childcare Benefit and the Guaranteed Income Supplement, without affecting other programs.

=== Trade ===
Caron's NDP leadership website states that Caron will work for "trade deals that work for Canadians". The website also states that "trade is good, when the deals are done right".

== Electoral record ==
=== Federal elections ===
2019 Canadian federal election: Rimouski-Neigette—Témiscouata—Les Basques
Party	Candidate	Votes	%	±%	Expenditures
Bloc Québécois	Maxime Blanchette-Joncas	17,314	37.8	+18.50	$13,984.50
New Democratic	Guy Caron	13,050	28.5	-14.61	none listed
Liberal	Chantal Pilon	10,095	22.1	-5.92	$42,899.50
Conservative	Nancy Brassard-Fortin	4,073	8.9	+1.42	$13,507.19
Green	Jocelyn Rioux	824	1.8	+0.31	none listed
People's	Pierre Lacombe	232	0.50	New	none listed
Rhinoceros	Lysane Picker-Paquin	179	0.4	-0.21	none listed
Total valid votes/expense limit		45,767	100.0		
Total rejected ballots		758			
Turnout		46,525	66.5		
Eligible voters		69,939			
Bloc Québécois gain from New Democratic		Swing		+16.56	
Source: Elections Canada

2015 Canadian federal election
Party	Candidate	Votes	%	±%	Expenditures
New Democratic	Guy Caron	19,374	43.11	+0.13	–
Liberal	Pierre Cadieux	12,594	28.02	+18.42	–
Bloc Québécois	Johanne Carignan	8,673	19.3	-11.53	–
Conservative	Francis Fortin	3,361	7.48	-7.08	–
Green	Louise Boutin	669	1.49	-0.54	–
Rhinoceros	Sébastien CôRhino Côrriveau	274	0.61	–	–
Total valid votes/Expense limit		44,837	100.0		$210,378.44
Total rejected ballots		–	–	–	
Turnout		–	–	–	
Eligible voters		69,631			
New Democratic hold		Swing		+9.28	
Source: Elections Canada

2011 Canadian federal election
Party	Candidate	Votes	%	±%	Expenditures
New Democratic	Guy Caron	18,360	42.98	+32.65	$1,454.82
Bloc Québécois	Claude Guimond	13,170	30.83	-13.85	$37,084.15
Conservative	Bertin Denis	6,218	14.56	-3.70	$48,523.44
Liberal	Pierre Cadieux	4,101	9.60	-10.49	$12,947.19
Green	Clément Pelletier	867	2.03	+0.40	none listed
Total valid votes/Expense limit		42,716	100.0		$86,716.92
Total rejected, unmarked and declined ballots		449	1.04	-0.13	
Turnout		43,165	62.90	+4.17	
Eligible voters		68,625			
New Democratic gain from Bloc Québécois		Swing		+23.25	

2008 Canadian federal election
Party	Candidate	Votes	%	±%	Expenditures
Bloc Québécois	Claude Guimond	17,652	44.68	-1.70	$26,530.06
Liberal	Pierre Béland	7,937	20.09	+0.76	$16,213.11
Conservative	Gaston Noël	7,216	18.26	-3.94	$50,736.77
New Democratic	Guy Caron	4,085	10.33	+0.53	$8,921.06
Independent	Louise Thibault	1,966	4.97	–	$10,441.59
Green	James D. Morrison	645	1.63	-0.65	none listed
Total valid votes/Expense limit		39,501	100.0		$83,533
Total rejected, unmarked and declined ballots		468	1.17	-0.05	
Turnout		39,969	58.73	-5.03	
Eligible voters		68,055			
Bloc Québécois hold		Swing		-1.23	
Independent candidate Louise Thibault was previously elected as a member of the Bloc Québécois, and lost 41.41 percentage points from her results in the 2006 election.

2006 Canadian federal election
Party	Candidate	Votes	%	±%	Expenditures
Bloc Québécois	Louise Thibault	19,804	46.38	-11.25	$37,738.52
Conservative	Roger Picard	9,481	22.20	+13.26	$15,575.69
Liberal	Michel Tremblay	8,254	19.33	-4.44	$54,457.05
New Democratic	Guy Caron	4,186	9.80	+2.75	$15,288.40
Green	François Bédard	973	2.28	-0.34	$30.76
Total valid votes/Expense limit		42,698	100.0		$77,697
Total rejected, unmarked and declined ballots		529	1.22	-0.68	
Turnout		43,227	63.76	+5.71	
Eligible voters		67,793			
Bloc Québécois hold		Swing		-12.26	

2004 Canadian federal election
Party	Candidate	Votes	%	±%	Expenditures
Bloc Québécois	Louise Thibault	22,215	57.63	-2.77	$37,917.81
Liberal	Côme Roy	9,161	23.77	-5.96	$52,950.93
Conservative	Denis Quimper	3,445	8.94	+2.10	$14,150.40
New Democratic	Guy Caron	2,717	7.05	+5.10	$6,486.64
Green	Marjolaine Delaunière	1,008	2.62	–	none listed
Total valid votes/Expense limit		38,546	100.0		$75,927
Total rejected, unmarked and declined ballots		747	1.90		
Turnout		39,293	58.05	-0.46	
Eligible voters		67,686			
Bloc Québécois notional hold		Swing		+1.60	
Changes from 2000 are based on redistributed results. Change for the Conservatives is based on the combined total of the Progressive Conservatives and the Canadian Alliance.

=== Municipal elections ===
2021 Rimouski Mayoral Election
Candidate	Vote	%
Guy Caron	13,976	80.71
Virginie Proulx	3,340	19.29
Pierre Lapointe	Withdrew	

== Personal life ==
Caron has been married to Valerie Stansfield since 2006. They have two children. At the time of his 2011 election they lived in Gatineau, Quebec; following the election they purchased a property in Rimouski, within Caron's riding, though stayed in Aylmer while Parliament was in session.
