= Saint-Marcellin, Quebec =

Saint-Marcellin
- Parish municipality
- Municipalité de la Paroisse de Saint-Marcellin
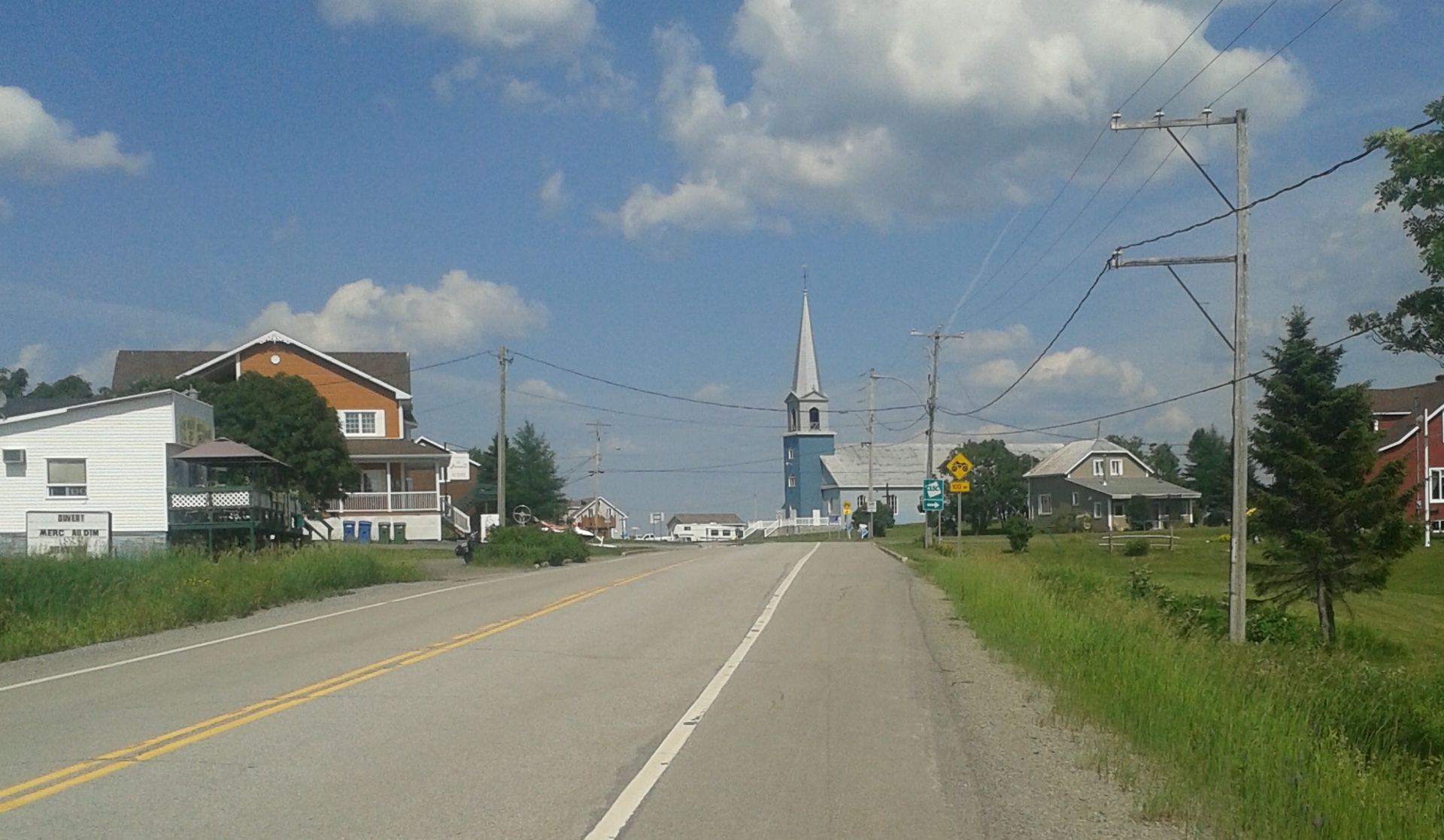
- Motto: Semence-Labeur-Espoir-Vie ("Seed-Labor-Hope-Life")
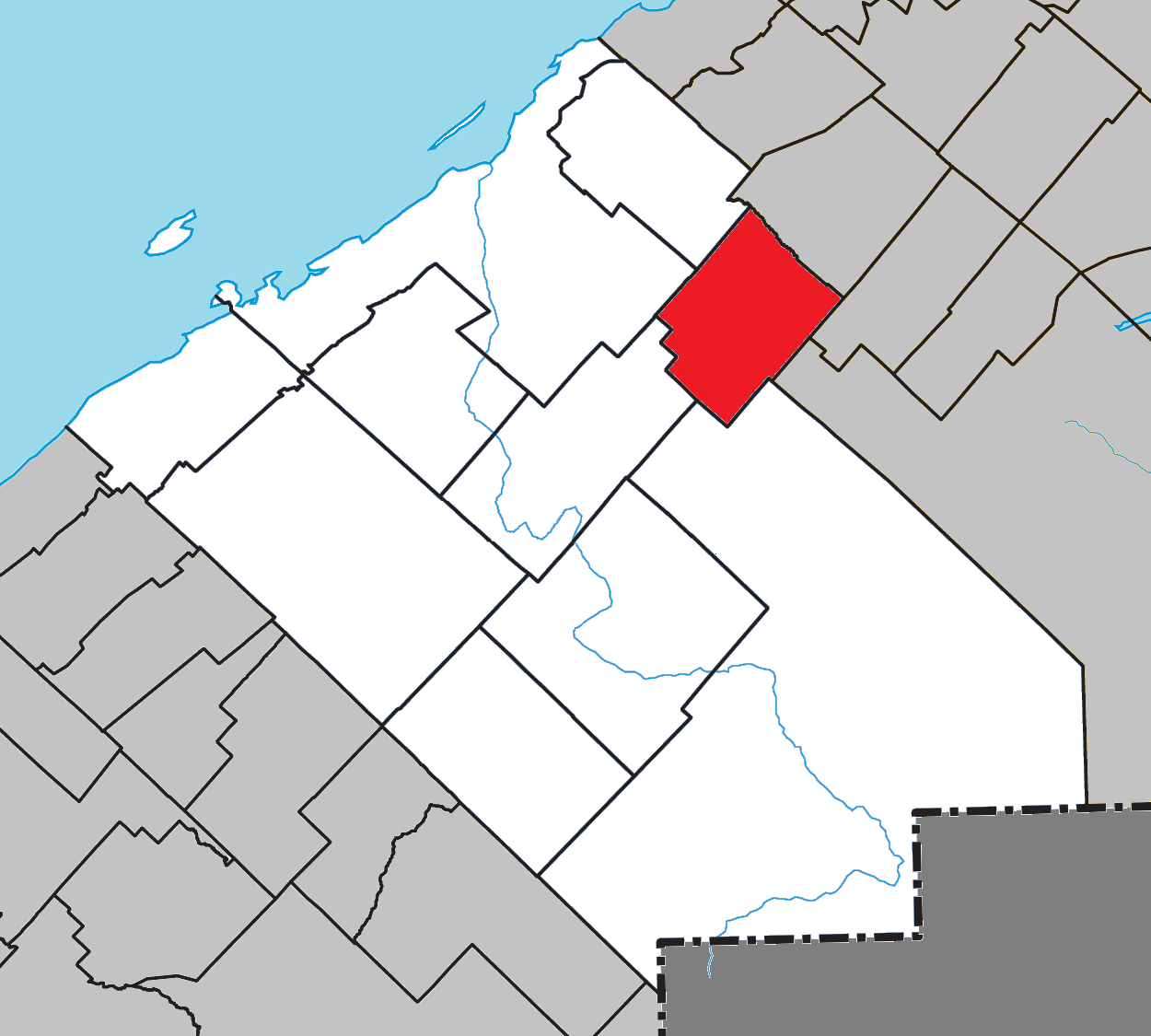
- Location within Rimouski-Neigette RCM

- Location in eastern Quebec
- Coordinates: 48.33°N 68.3°W
- Country: Canada
- Province: Quebec
- Region: Bas-Saint-Laurent
- RCM: Rimouski-Neigette
- Constituted: November 19, 1924

Government
  - Mayor: Julie Thériault
  - Federal riding: Rimouski-Neigette—Mitis—Matapédia—Les Basques
  - Prov. riding: Rimouski

Area
  - Total: 120.00 km^{2} (46.33 sq mi)
  - Land: 117.19 km^{2} (45.25 sq mi)

Population (2021)
  - Total: 397
  - Density: 3.4/km^{2} (8.8/sq mi)
  - Pop 2016-2021: ▲12.5%
  - Dwellings: 324
- Time zone: UTC−5 (EST)
  - Summer (DST): UTC−4 (EDT)
- Postal code(s): G0K 1R0
- Area codes: 418 and 581
- Highways: R-234
- Website: www.st-marcellin.qc.ca

Saint-Marcellin (French pronunciation: [sɛ̃ maʁsəlɛ̃]) is a parish municipality in the Canadian province of Quebec, located in the Rimouski-Neigette Regional County Municipality in the Bas-Saint-Laurent region.

== Demographics ==
In the 2021 Census of Population conducted by Statistics Canada, Saint-Marcellin had a population of 397 living in 213 of its 324 total private dwellings, a change of 12.5% from its 2016 population of 353. With a land area of 117.19 km^{2} (45.25 sq mi), it had a population density of 3.4/km^{2} (8.8/sq mi) in 2021.

== See also ==
- List of parish municipalities in Quebec
