= Claude Guimond =

Canadian politician

Claude Guimond MP

Member of Parliament for Rimouski-Neigette—Témiscouata—Les Basques
- In office October 14, 2008 – May 2, 2011
- Preceded by: Louise Thibault
- Succeeded by: Guy Caron

Personal details
- Born: August 4, 1963 (age 63) Rimouski, Quebec
- Party: Bloc Québécois

Claude Guimond (born August 4, 1963) is a Canadian politician, who was elected to represent the electoral district of Rimouski-Neigette—Témiscouata—Les Basques in the 2008 Canadian federal election and then defeated in the 2011 Canadian federal election. He served as a member of the Bloc Québécois.
