= Saint-Joachim, Quebec =

Saint-Joachim
- Parish municipality
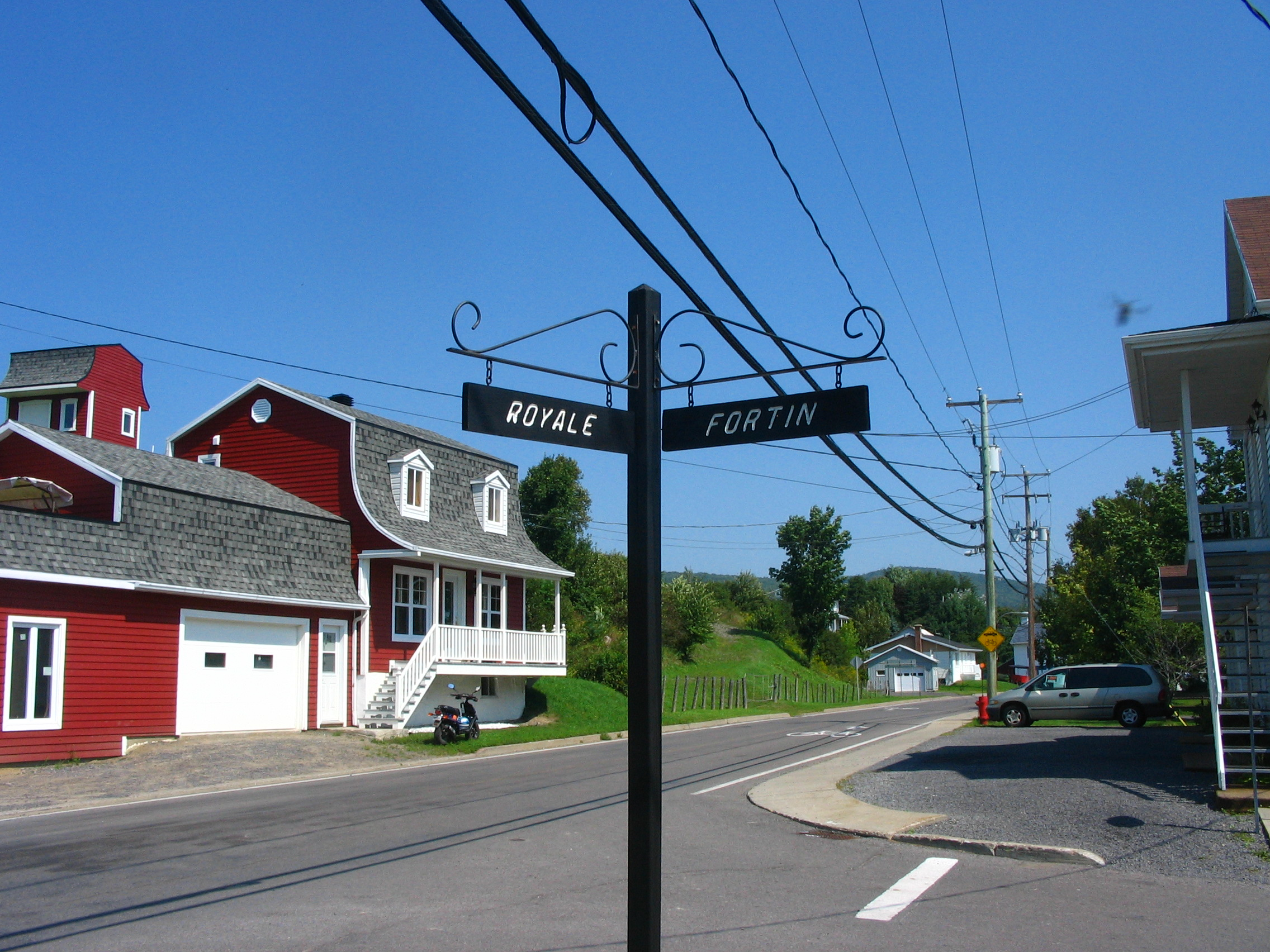

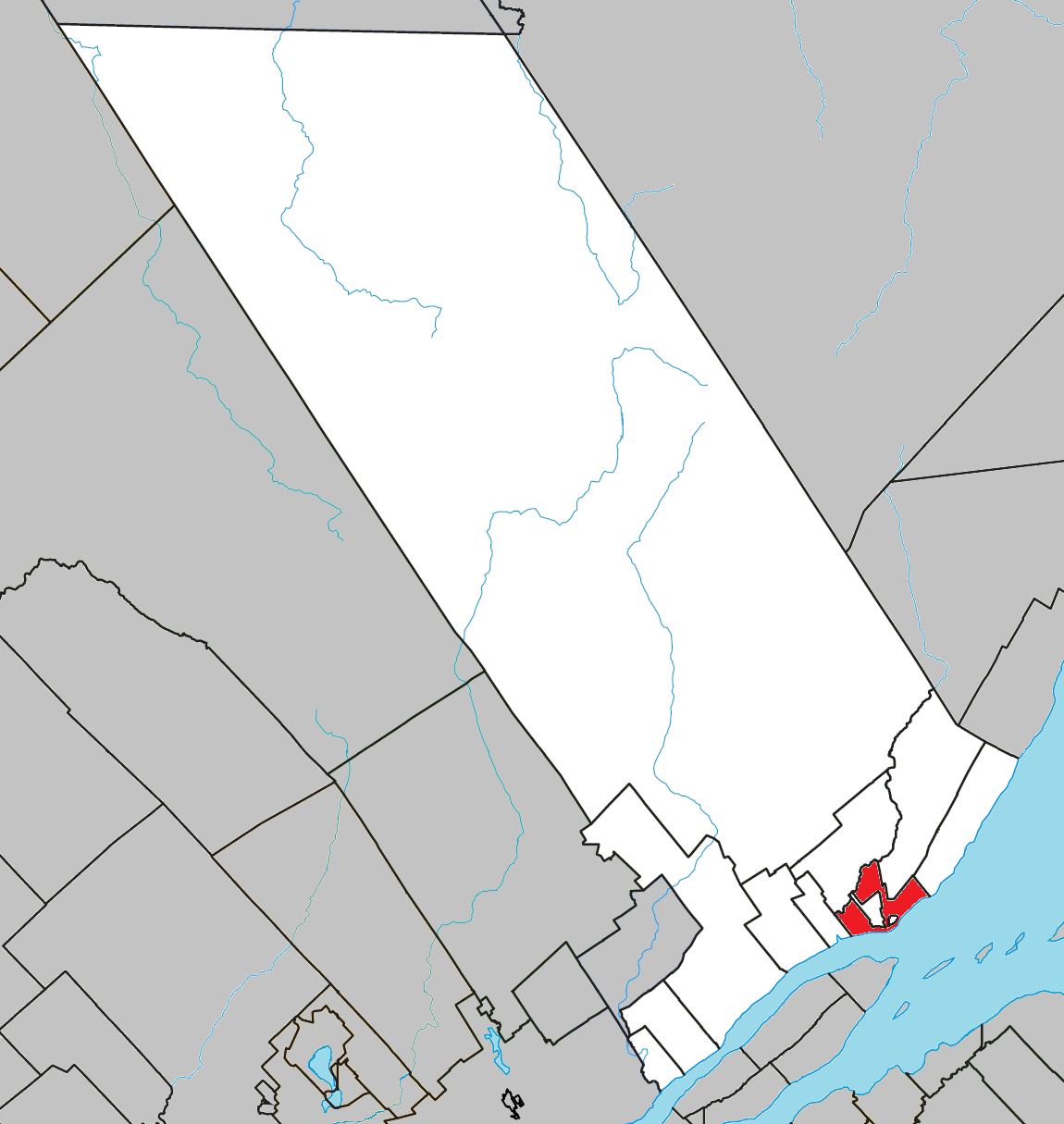
- Location within La Côte-de-Beaupré RCM

- Location in central Quebec
- Coordinates: 47°03′N 70°51′W
- Country: Canada
- Province: Quebec
- Region: Capitale-Nationale
- RCM: La Côte-de-Beaupré
- Constituted: July 1, 1855

Government
  - Mayor: Mario Langevin
  - Federal riding: Montmorency—Charlevoix
  - Prov. riding: Charlevoix–Côte-de-Beaupré

Area
  - Total: 48.13 km^{2} (18.58 sq mi)
  - Land: 42.33 km^{2} (16.34 sq mi)

Population (2021)
  - Total: 1,427
  - Density: 33.7/km^{2} (87/sq mi)
  - Pop (2016-21): ▼1.0%
  - Dwellings: 682
- Time zone: UTC−5 (EST)
  - Summer (DST): UTC−4 (EDT)
- Postal code(s): G0A 3X0
- Area codes: 418 and 581
- Highways: R-138
- Website: saintjoachim.qc.ca

Saint-Joachim (French pronunciation: [sɛ̃ ʒɔaʃɛ̃]) is a parish municipality in Quebec, Canada. It is part of the La Côte-de-Beaupré Regional County Municipality in the Capitale-Nationale region. Located at the foot of Cape Tourmente, it is home to the Cap Tourmente National Wildlife Area and Canyon Sainte-Anne.

== History ==
The area, originally named after Cape Tourmente, was one of the first places in New France to be colonized. In 1628, it was destroyed by the Kirke Brothers but it became an agricultural centre again after 1668 when François de Laval bought land around the cape to establish farms to feed his Seminary of Quebec. A few years later, the Saint-Joachim Parish was founded, and the place became known by the parish name.

In 1845, the parish municipality was formed, but abolished in 1847, and reestablished in 1855.

In 1916, Saint-Joachim lost large portions of its territory when the Parish Municipality of Saint-Louis-de-Gonzague-du-Cap-Tourmente was created to separate the lands and buildings belonging to the seminary from Saint-Joachim. However, except for a small enclave, these lands have returned to Saint-Joachim over time.

== Demographics ==
In the 2021 Census of Population conducted by Statistics Canada, Saint-Joachim had a population of 1,427 living in 629 of its 682 total private dwellings, a change of −1% from its 2016 population of 1,441. With a land area of 42.33 km^{2} (16.34 sq mi), it had a population density of 33.7/km^{2} (87.3/sq mi) in 2021.

Historical census populations – Saint-Joachim, Quebec

Year	Pop.	±%
1871	923	—
1881	959	+3.9%
1891	897	−6.5%
1901	853	−4.9%
1911	853	+0.0%
1921	940	+10.2%
1931	1,131	+20.3%
1941	1,232	+8.9%

Year	Pop.	±%
1951	1,364	+10.7%
1956	1,470	+7.8%
1961	1,527	+3.9%
1966	1,436	−6.0%
1971	1,376	−4.2%
1976	1,383	+0.5%
1981	1,489	+7.7%
1986	1,489	+0.0%

Year	Pop.	±%
1991	1,478	−0.7%
1996	1,493	+1.0%
2001	1,471	−1.5%
2006	1,362	−7.4%
2011	1,471	+8.0%
2016	1,441	−2.0%
2021	1,427	−1.0%

2011 Population figure based on revised count. Population counts are not adjusted for boundary changes.
Source: Statistics Canada

Mother tongue (2021):

- English as first language: 0.4%
- French as first language: 98.6%
- English and French as first language: 0%
- Other as first language: 0.7%

== Image gallery ==
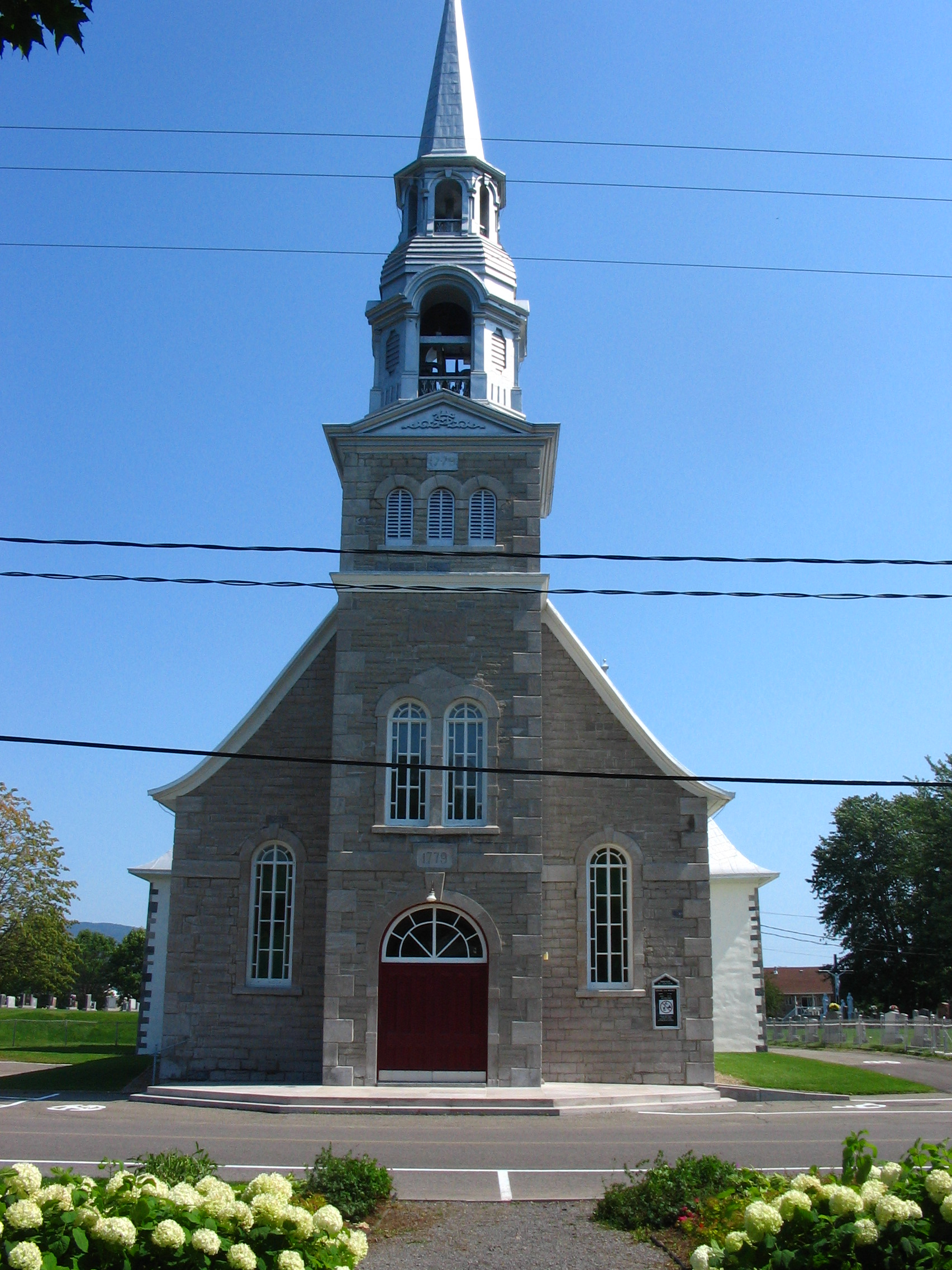
Saint-Joachim church, built between 1777 and 1779

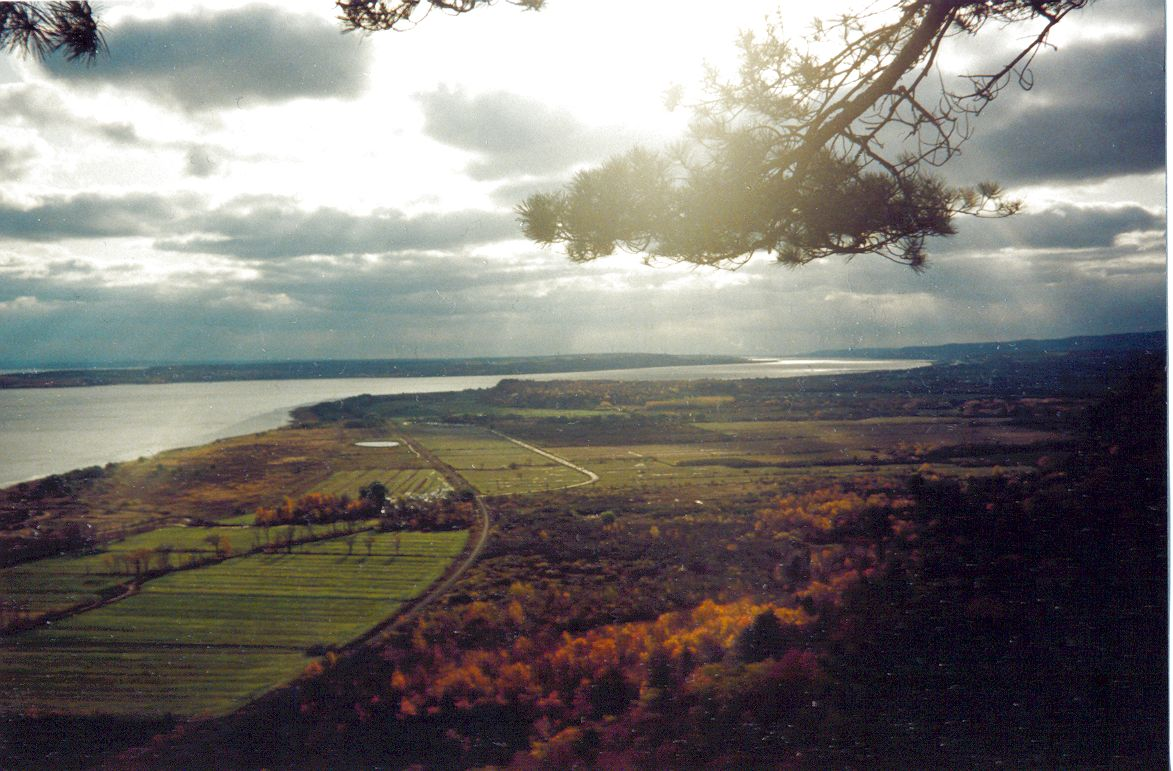
View from Cape Tourmente over Saint-Joachim's countryside

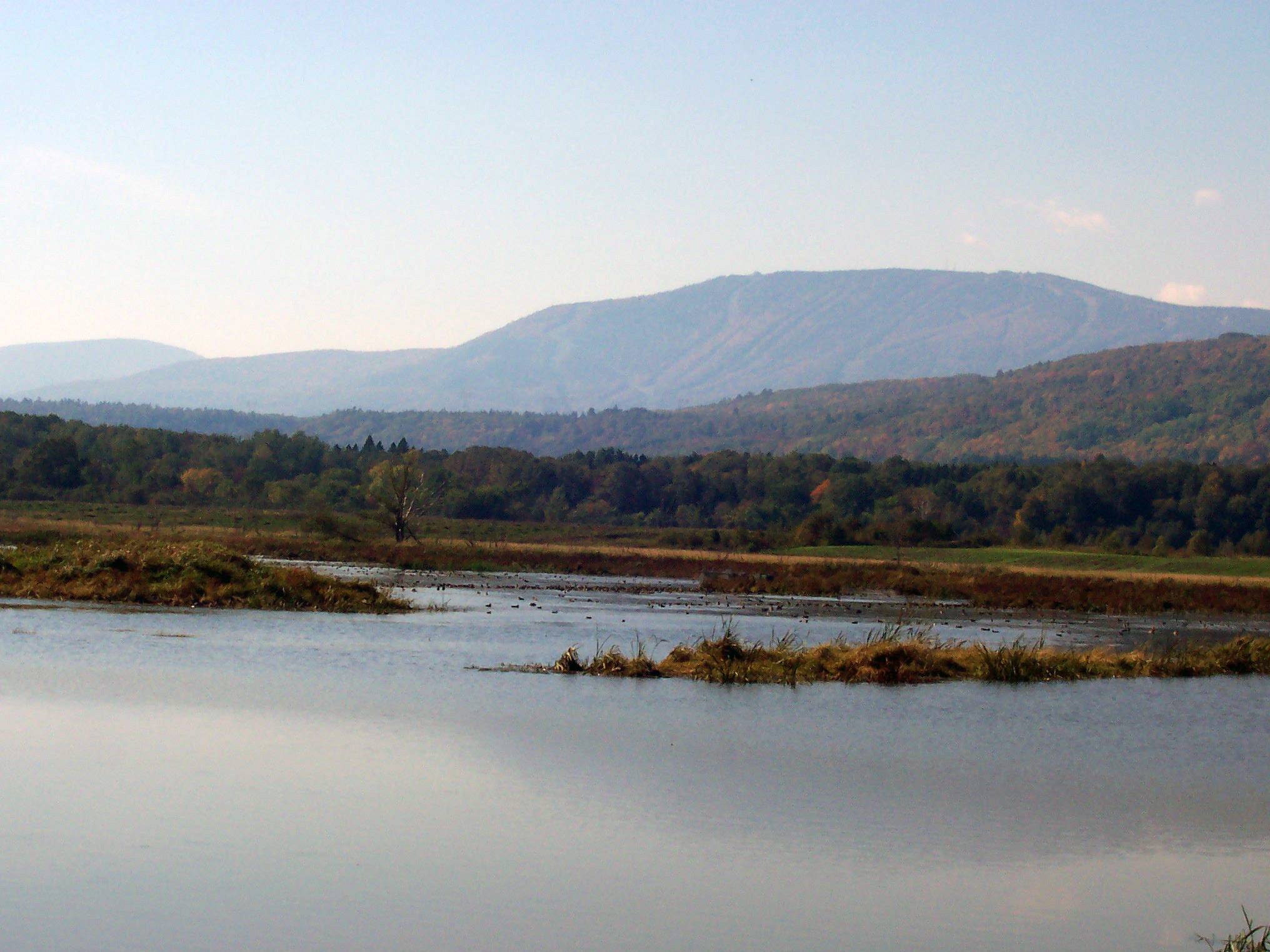
Scenery at Cap Tourmente Wildlife Area with Mont-Sainte-Anne in the background

== See also ==
- List of parish municipalities in Quebec
