= Saint-Louis-de-Gonzague-du-Cap-Tourmente =

Saint-Louis-de-Gonzague- du-Cap-Tourmente
- Parish municipality
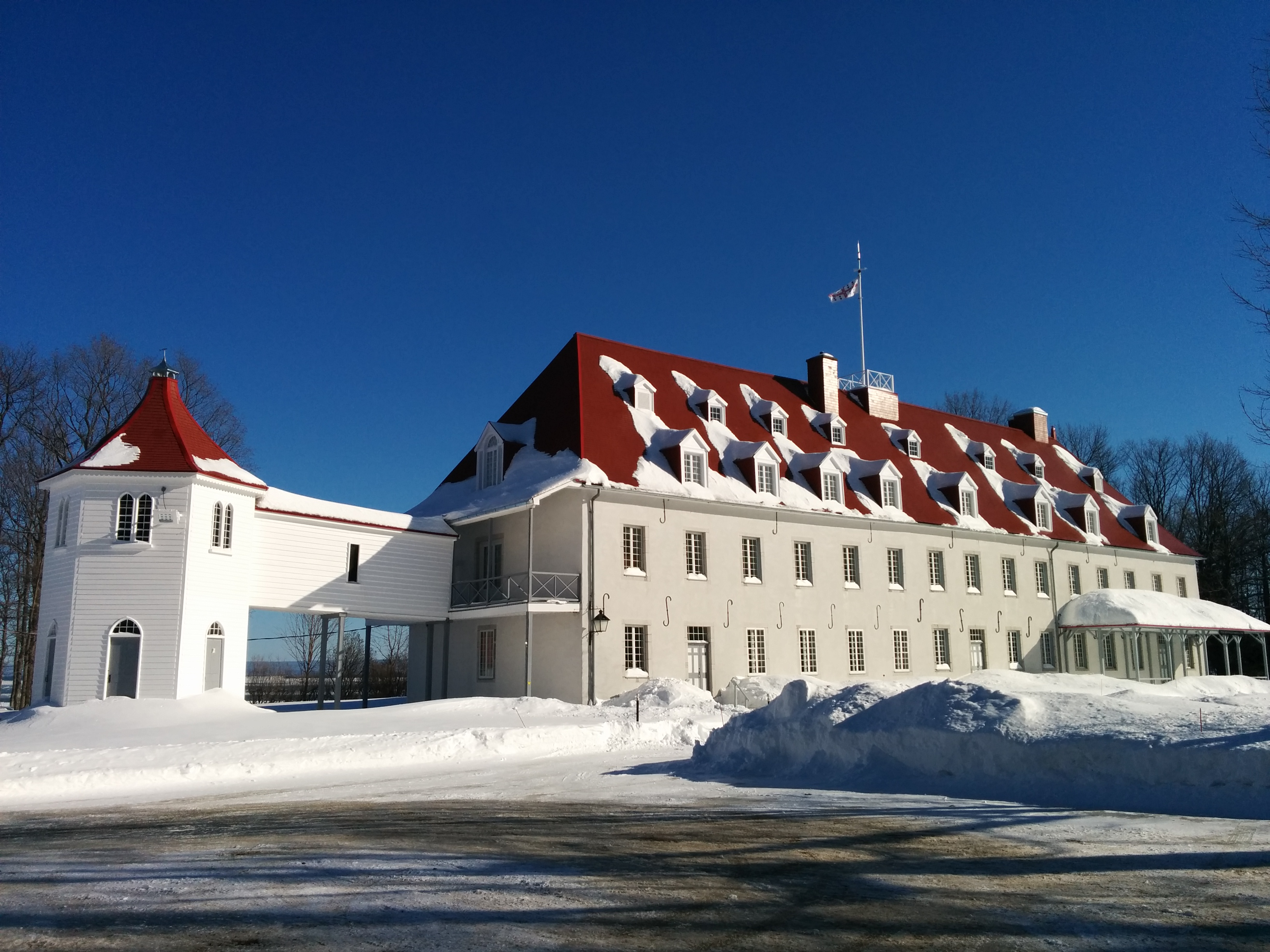

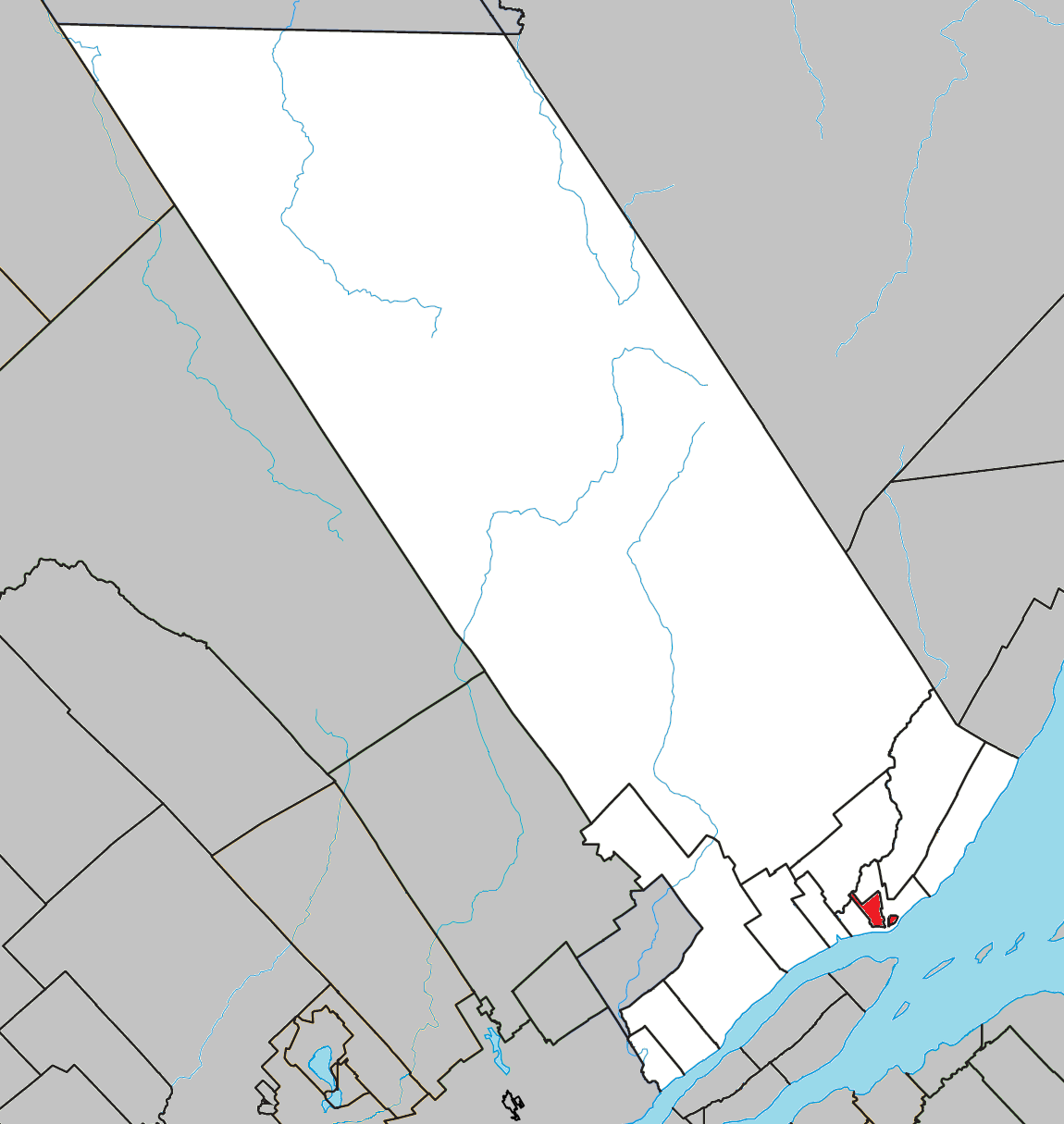
- Location within La Côte-de-Beaupré RCM

- Location in central Quebec
- Coordinates: 47°04′N 70°50′W
- Country: Canada
- Province: Quebec
- Region: Capitale-Nationale
- RCM: La Côte-de-Beaupré
- Constituted: January 1, 1917

Government
  - Administrator: Gilles Routhier
  - Federal riding: Montmorency—Charlevoix
  - Prov. riding: Charlevoix–Côte-de-Beaupré

Area
  - Total: 0.5 km^{2} (0.19 sq mi)
  - Land: 0.42 km^{2} (0.16 sq mi)

Population (2021)
  - Total: 0
  - Density: 0/km^{2} (0/sq mi)
  - Pop (2016-21): ▼100%
  - Dwellings: 1
- Time zone: UTC−5 (EST)
  - Summer (DST): UTC−4 (EDT)
- Postal code(s): G1R 4R7
- Area codes: 418 and 581
- Highways: R-138

Saint-Louis-de-Gonzague-du-Cap-Tourmente (French pronunciation: [sɛ̃ lwi də ɡɔ̃zaɡ dy kap tuʁmɑ̃t]) is a parish municipality in Quebec, Canada.

Its population in the 2021 Canadian census was 0. It is a relic of the seigneurial system of New France.

== Geography ==
Saint-Louis-de-Gonzague-du-Cap-Tourmente is a small enclave within the municipality of Saint-Joachim, at the foot of Cape Tourmente, and east of Sainte-Anne-de-Beaupré, in the regional county municipality of La Côte-de-Beaupré in the region of Capitale-Nationale.

Located near the provincial capital of Quebec City, it is part of the Communauté métropolitaine de Québec.

== History ==
Named for Saint Aloysius Gonzaga and Cap Tourmente, a stormy promontory named by Samuel de Champlain, the municipality was set up in 1917 by a law that detached certain buildings and lands belonging to the Séminaire de Québec from the parish of Saint-Joachim in order to avoid paying municipal taxes and fees. At that time, it had an area of several square kilometres, including farmland; however, the law specified that if the Séminaire sold any of its property, it would revert to Saint-Joachim.

By and by, all of the Séminaire's property was sold and was thereby returned to Saint-Joachim, except for the Petit-Cap property, which now constitutes the entire territory of the municipality.

== Government ==
The municipality is not governed by a municipal council but by the Board of Directors of the Séminaire de Québec. As such, it does not have a mayor but rather an administrator.

== Demographics ==
In the 2021 Census of Population conducted by Statistics Canada, Saint-Louis-de-Gonzague-du-Cap-Tourmente had a population of 0 living in 1 of its 1 total private dwellings, a change of −100% from its 2016 population of 5. With a land area of 0.42 km^{2} (0.16 sq mi), it had a population density of 0.0/km^{2} (0.0/sq mi) in 2021.

Historical census populations – Saint-Louis-de-Gonzague-du-Cap-Tourmente

Year	Pop.	±%
1991	6	—
1996	4	−33.3%
2001	0	−100.0%
2006	0	0.00%

Year	Pop.	±%
2011	5	—
2016	5	+0.0%
2021	0	−100.0%

2011 Population figure based on revised count. Population counts are not adjusted for boundary changes.
Source: Statistics Canada

== See also ==
- Notre-Dame-des-Anges, Quebec
- List of parish municipalities in Quebec
