= Maxime Blanchette-Joncas =

Canadian politician (born 1989)

Maxime Blanchette-Joncas MP
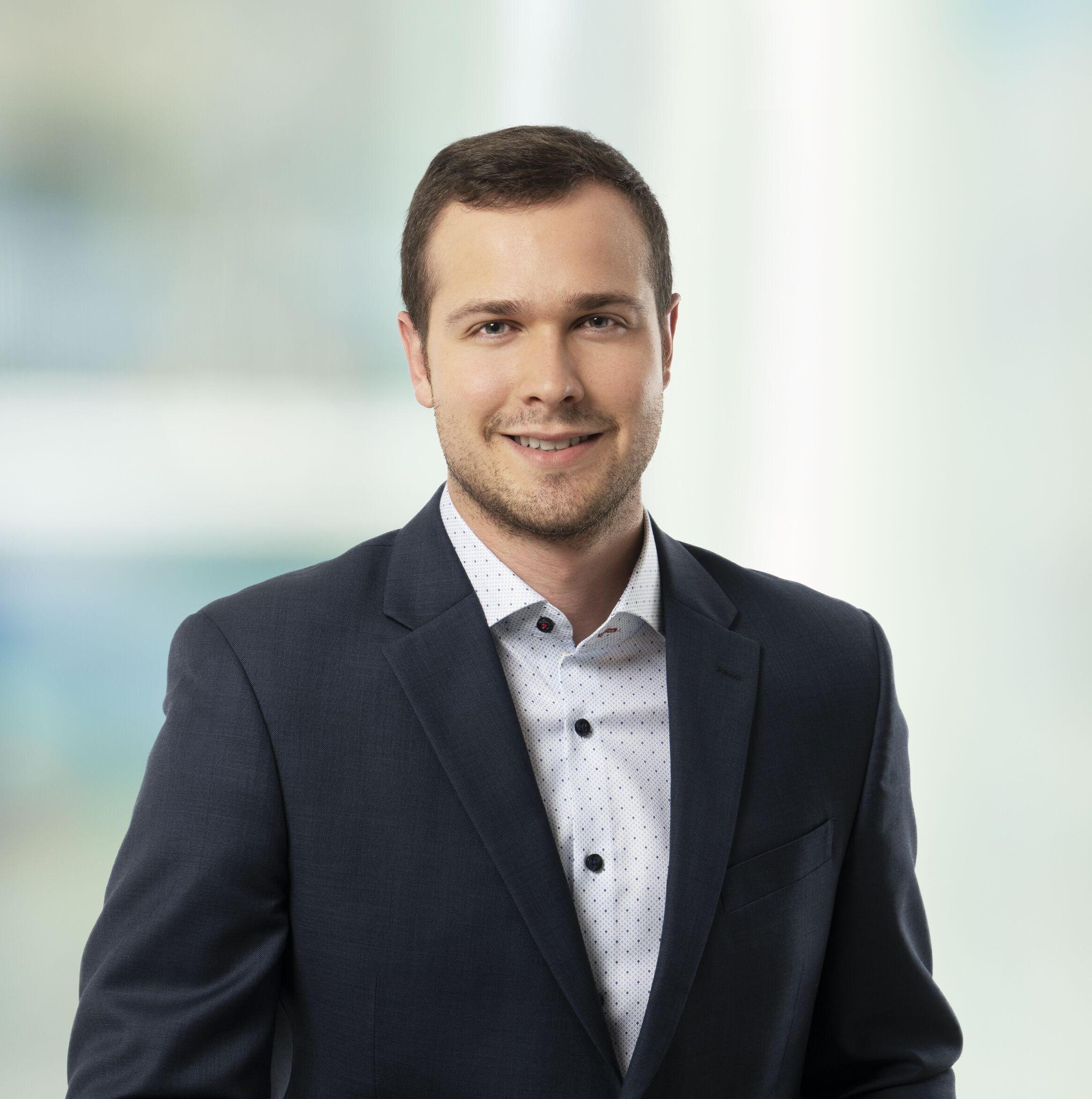

Member of Parliament for Rimouski—La Matapédia Rimouski-Neigette—Témiscouata—Les Basques (2019–2025)
- Incumbent
- Assumed office October 21, 2019
- Preceded by: Guy Caron

Personal details
- Born: 1989 (age 36–37) Rimouski, Quebec, Canada
- Party: Bloc Québécois

Maxime Blanchette-Joncas MP (born 1989) is a Canadian politician, who was elected to the House of Commons of Canada in the 2019 election. He represents the electoral district of Rimouski—La Matapédia as a member of the Bloc Québécois.

== Political career ==
Since 2021 he has served as the critic for the St. Lawrence Seaway, science and innovation in the Bloc Québécois Shadow Cabinet.

== Electoral record ==
2025 Canadian federal election: Rimouski—La Matapédia
** Preliminary results — Not yet official **
Party	Candidate	Votes	%	±%	Expenditures
Bloc Québécois	Maxime Blanchette-Joncas	24,608	46.28	–8.02	
Liberal	Alexander Reford	18,846	35.44	+13.36	
Conservative	Nancy Joannette	7,201	13.54	+2.34	
New Democratic	Salomé Salvain	946	1.78	–4.08	
Independent	Noémi Bureau-Civil	608	1.14	–1.87	
People's	Taraneh Javanbakht	337	0.63	–1.43	
Rhinoceros	Lysane Picker-Paquin	295	0.55	N/A	
Independent	Raphaël Arsenault	239	0.45	N/A	
Independent	Tommy Lefebvre	95	0.18	N/A	
Total valid votes/expense limit					
Total rejected ballots					
Turnout		53,175	63.20		
Eligible voters		84,140			
Bloc Québécois notional hold		Swing		–10.69	
Source: Elections Canada

2021 Canadian federal election: Rimouski-Neigette—Témiscouata—Les Basques
Party	Candidate	Votes	%	±%	Expenditures
Bloc Québécois	Maxime Blanchette-Joncas	20,657	49.0	+11.2	$29,861.18
Liberal	Léonie Lajoie	10,482	24.9	+2.8	$9,539.74
Conservative	France Gagnon	5,569	13.2	+4.3	$3,704.22
New Democratic	Sylvain Lajoie	2,641	6.3	-22.2	$621.60
Independent	Noémi Bureau-Civil	1,467	3.5	N/A	$2,245.90
People's	Jean Tardy	700	1.7	+1.2	$2,383.86
Free	Michel Raymond	430	1.0	N/A	$301.03
Rhinoceros	Megan Hodges	192	0.5	+0.1	$0.00
Total valid votes/expense limit		42,138	98.0	–	$110,576.53
Total rejected ballots		881	2.0		
Turnout		43,019	61.1		
Registered voters		70,467			
Bloc Québécois hold		Swing		+4.2	
Source: Elections Canada

2019 Canadian federal election: Rimouski-Neigette—Témiscouata—Les Basques
Party	Candidate	Votes	%	±%	Expenditures
Bloc Québécois	Maxime Blanchette-Joncas	17,314	37.8	+18.50	$13,984.50
New Democratic	Guy Caron	13,050	28.5	-14.61	none listed
Liberal	Chantal Pilon	10,095	22.1	-5.92	$42,899.50
Conservative	Nancy Brassard-Fortin	4,073	8.9	+1.42	$13,507.19
Green	Jocelyn Rioux	824	1.8	+0.31	none listed
People's	Pierre Lacombe	232	0.50	New	none listed
Rhinoceros	Lysane Picker-Paquin	179	0.4	-0.21	none listed
Total valid votes/expense limit		45,767	100.0		
Total rejected ballots		758			
Turnout		46,525	66.5		
Eligible voters		69,939			
Bloc Québécois gain from New Democratic		Swing		+16.56	
Source: Elections Canada
