= Saint-Anaclet-de-Lessard =

- Parish municipality
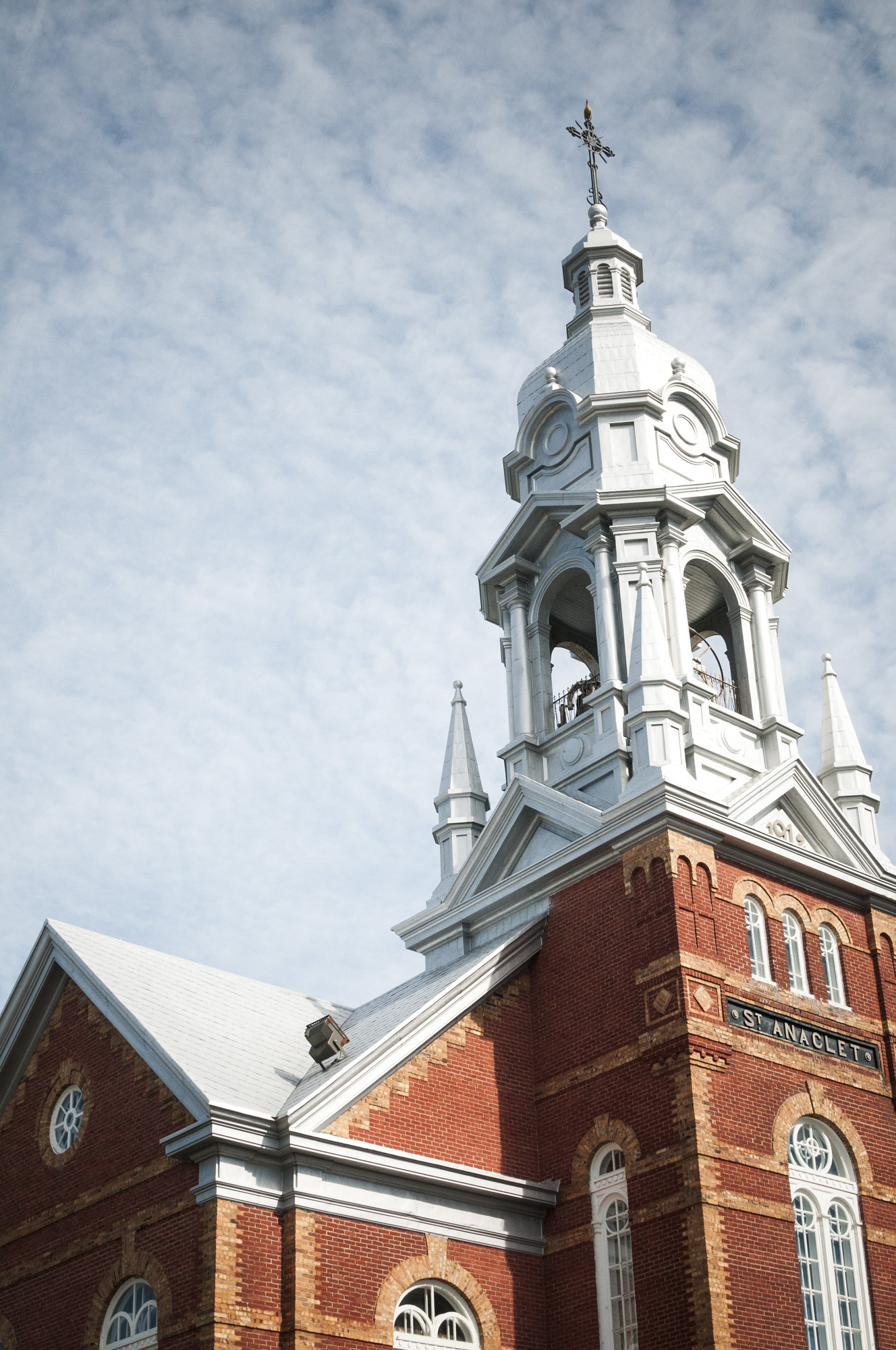
- Church of Saint-Anaclet-de-Lessard

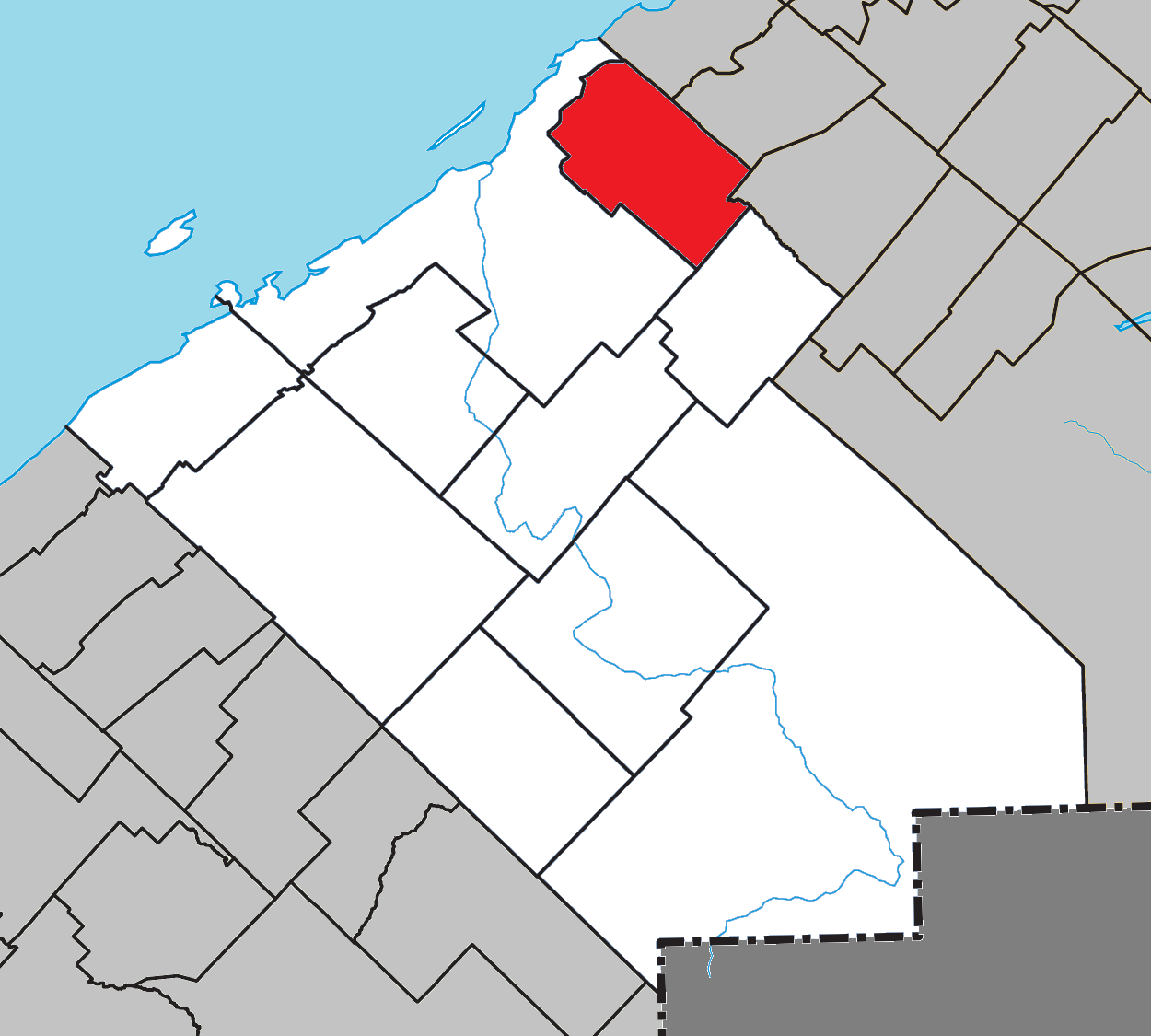
- Location within Rimouski-Neigette RCM

- Location in eastern Quebec
- Coordinates: 48.476°N 68.426°W
- Country: Canada
- Province: Quebec
- Region: Bas-Saint-Laurent
- RCM: Rimouski-Neigette
- Constituted: May 9, 1859

Government
  - Mayor: Francis St-Pierre
  - Federal riding: Rimouski-Neigette—Mitis—Matapédia—Les Basques
  - Prov. riding: Rimouski

Area
  - Total: 128.20 km^{2} (49.50 sq mi)
  - Land: 126.37 km^{2} (48.79 sq mi)

Population (2021)
  - Total: 3,019
  - Density: 23.9/km^{2} (62/sq mi)
  - Pop 2016-2021: ▼1.7%
  - Dwellings: 1,324
- Time zone: UTC−5 (EST)
  - Summer (DST): UTC−4 (EDT)
- Postal code(s): G0K 1H0
- Area codes: 418 and 581
- Highways: A-20
- Website: stanaclet.qc.ca

Saint-Anaclet-de-Lessard (French pronunciation: [sɛ̃t‿anaklɛ də lɛsaʁ]) is a parish municipality in the Canadian province of Quebec, located in the Rimouski-Neigette Regional County Municipality.

== History ==
On 8 March 1696, Louis de Buade de Frontenac granted the seigneury of Lessard to Pierre de Lessard and Barbe Fortin. Over the next 200 years, Saint-Anaclet underwent many territorial changes as a result of exchanges and annexations to meet the requirements of the lords of the day.

Saint-Anaclet-de-Lessard was officially created on May 8, 1859, when territories from Saint-Germain-de-Rimouski and Sainte-Luce were merged to create the new municipality. However, it was not until the following September 14 that the first cadastre was deposited, defining the municipality's first territorial boundaries. On 27 June 1892, the municipality expanded its territory with the annexation of Canton Neigette.

On August 7, 1945, a violent fire at the Convent of the Sisters of the Holy Rosary spread and destroyed the village centre. Part of rue Banville and rue Principale, west of the church, went up in smoke. But it only took a few years for new buildings to erase the traces of this disaster.

After a period of rural exodus, the population of Saint-Anaclet has been growing since the late 1960s. The urbanisation phenomenon saw the population rise from 1,450 to 2,750 in 40 years. At the same time, the forestry industry declined and the agricultural sector was transformed, with fewer farms being replaced by larger holdings. New developments were added to the original urban axes of Rue Principale and Rue de la Gare. The municipality built new infrastructure and added services for its growing number of taxpayers.

The 2000s were a time of great excitement. Municipal reorganizations revived passions. On 23 April 2001, the municipal council passed a resolution expressing its refusal to be annexed to Rimouski. New streets and an industrial park were built.

== Demographics ==
In the 2021 Census of Population conducted by Statistics Canada, Saint-Anaclet-de-Lessard had a population of 3,019 living in 1,275 of its 1,324 total private dwellings, a change of −1.7% from its 2016 population of 3,071. With a land area of 126.37 km^{2} (48.79 sq mi), it had a population density of 23.9/km^{2} (61.9/sq mi) in 2021.

=== Population ===
Canada census – Saint-Anaclet-de-Lessard community profile

	2021	2016	2011
Population	3,019 (-1.7% from 2016)	3,071 (1.2% from 2011)	3,035 (14.8% from 2006)
Land area	126.37 km^{2} (48.79 sq mi)	126.77 km^{2} (48.95 sq mi)	127.21 km^{2} (49.12 sq mi)
Population density	23.9/km^{2} (62/sq mi)	24.2/km^{2} (63/sq mi)	23.9/km^{2} (62/sq mi)
Median age	42.4 (M: 42.8, F: 42.0)	41.2 (M: 41.3, F: 41.1)	40.2 (M: 40.5, F: 40.0)
Private dwellings	1,324 (total)	1,324 (total)	1,302 (total)
Median household income	$83,000	$71,680	$67,446

References: 2021 2016 2011

== See also ==
- List of parish municipalities in Quebec
