= Saint-Fabien =

- Parish municipality
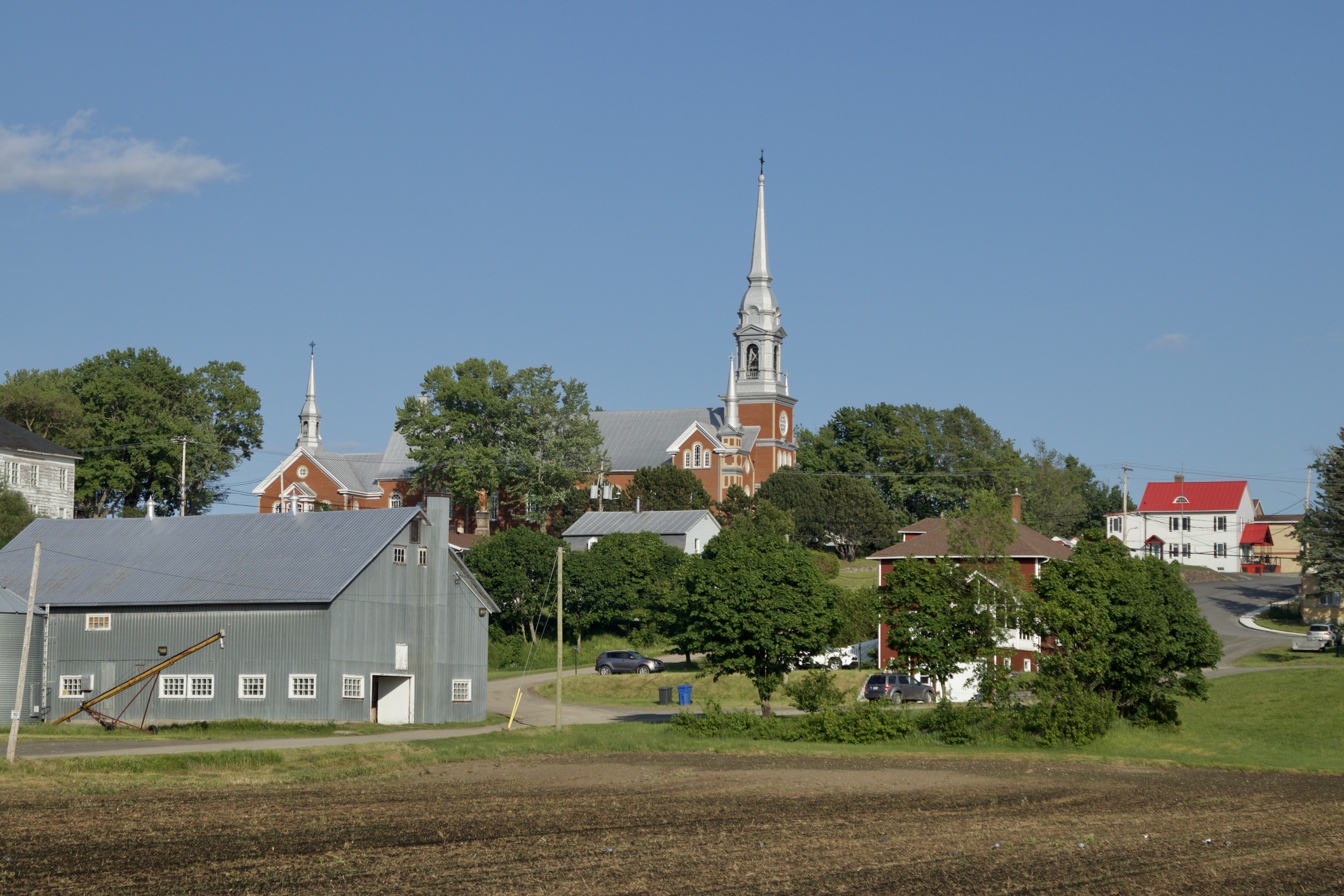
- Skyline of Saint-Fabien

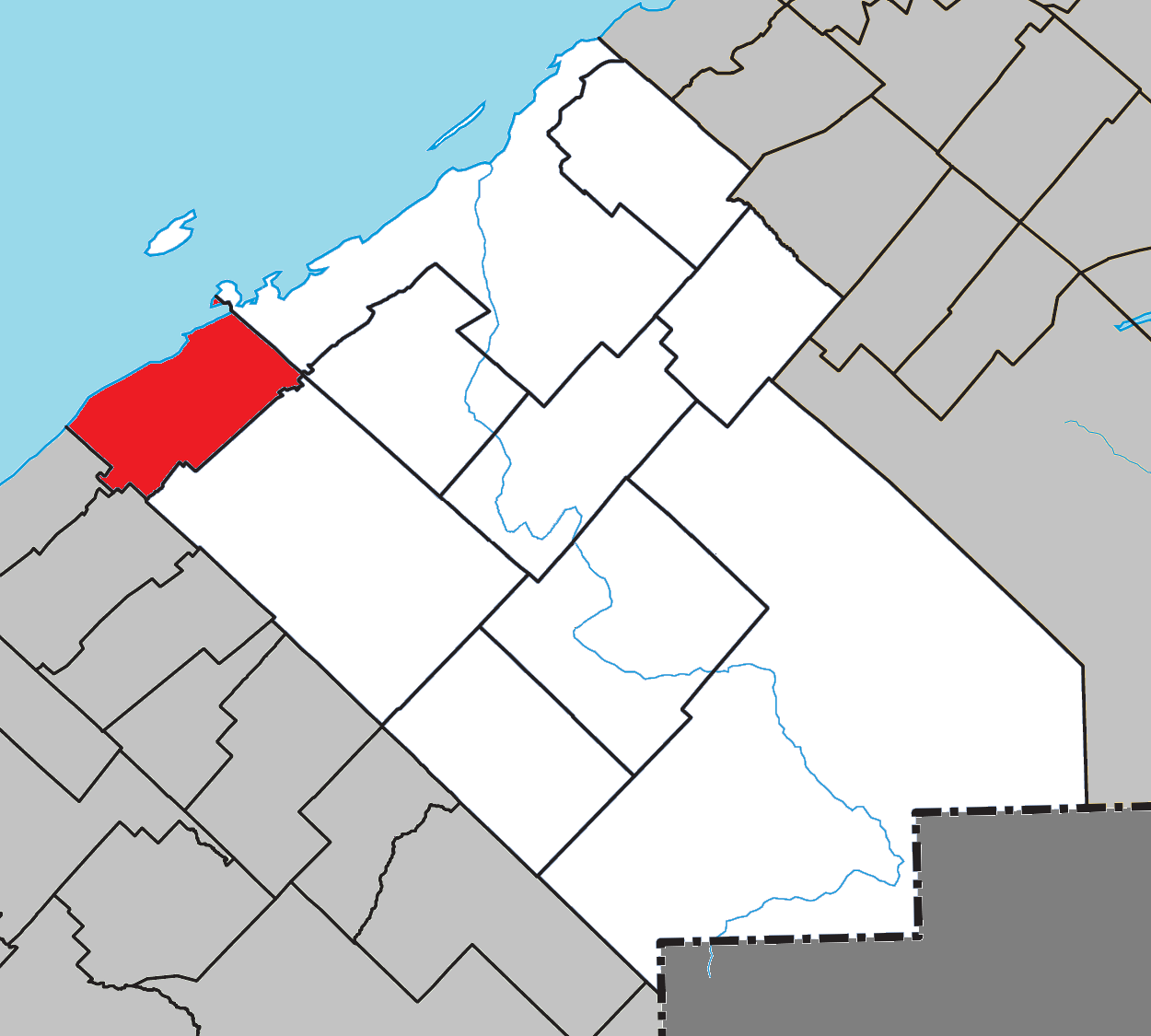
- Location within Rimouski-Neigette RCM

- Location in eastern Quebec
- Coordinates: 48.3°N 68.87°W
- Country: Canada
- Province: Quebec
- Region: Bas-Saint-Laurent
- RCM: Rimouski-Neigette
- Constituted: July 1, 1855

Government
  - Mayor: Mario Beauchesne
  - Federal riding: Rimouski-Neigette—Mitis—Matapédia—Les Basques
  - Prov. riding: Rimouski

Area
  - Parish municipality: 124.10 km^{2} (47.92 sq mi)
  - Land: 119.92 km^{2} (46.30 sq mi)

Population (2021)
  - Parish municipality: 1,834
  - Density: 15.3/km^{2} (40/sq mi)
  - Urban: 1,067
  - Pop 2016-2021: ▼0.2%
  - Dwellings: 1,171
- Time zone: UTC−5 (EST)
  - Summer (DST): UTC−4 (EDT)
- Postal code(s): G0L 2Z0
- Area codes: 418 and 581
- Highways: R-132
- Website: www.saintfabien.net

Saint-Fabien (French pronunciation: [sɛ̃ fabjɛ̃]) is a parish municipality in the Canadian province of Quebec, located in the Rimouski-Neigette Regional County Municipality.

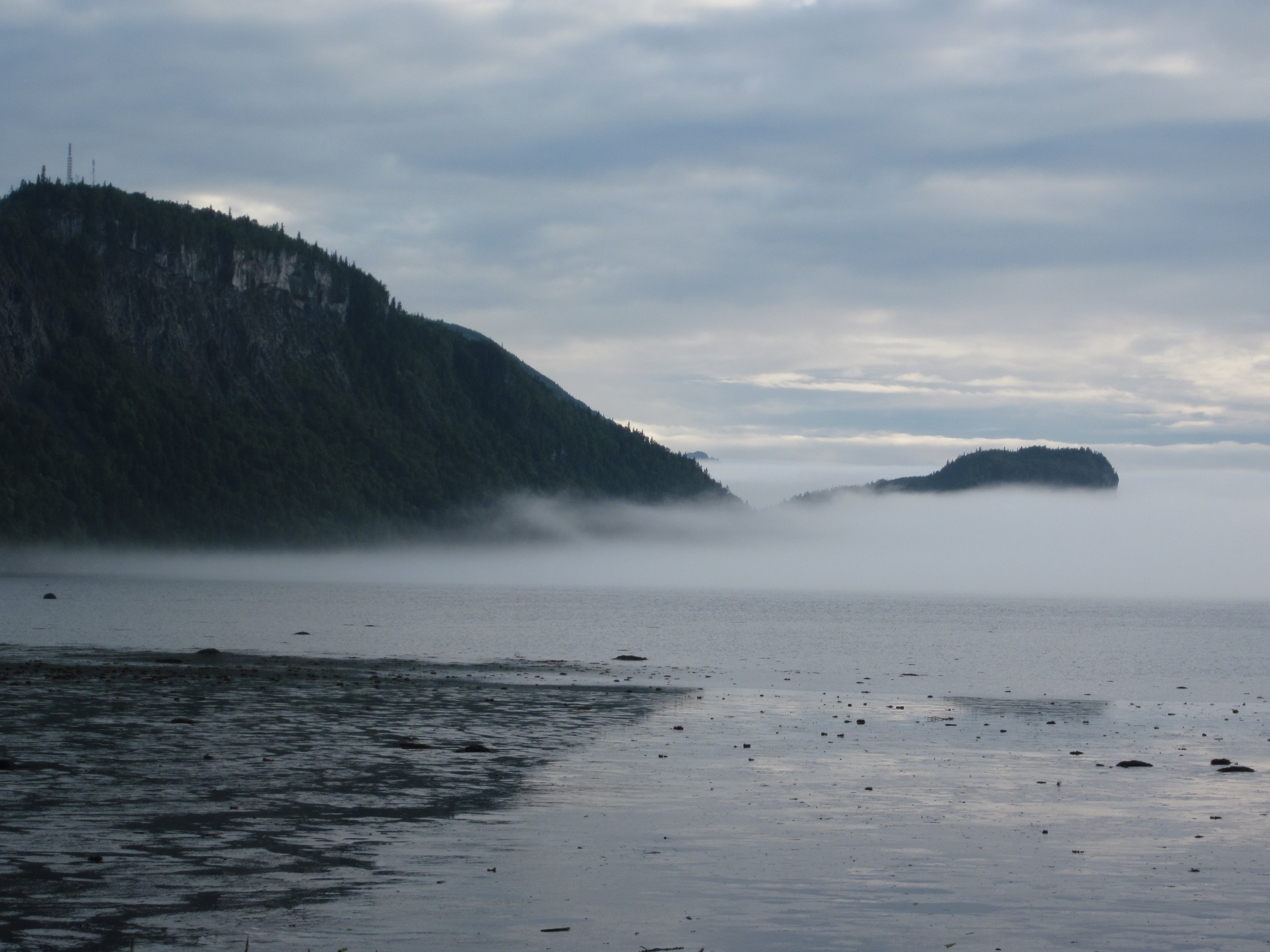
Baie du Ha! Ha! in Bic National Park

== Demographics ==
In the 2021 Census of Population conducted by Statistics Canada, Saint-Fabien had a population of 1,834 living in 867 of its 1,171 total private dwellings, a change of −0.2% from its 2016 population of 1,837. With a land area of 119.92 km^{2} (46.30 sq mi), it had a population density of 15.3/km^{2} (39.6/sq mi) in 2021.

=== Population ===
Population trend:

Census	Population	Change (%)
2021	1,834	▼0.2%
2016	1,837	▼3.6%
2011	1,906	▼2.4%
2006	1,952	▲5.6%
2001	1,848	▲0.5%
1996	1,838	▲0.9%
1991	1,822	▼10.0%
1986	2,024	▼2.9%
1981	2,084	▼1.7%
1976	2,119	▼10.9%
1971	2,378	▼7.1%
1966	2,561	▼20.1%
1961	3,207	▲4.6%
1956	3,067	▲9.8%
1951	2,793	▲8.6%
1941	2,571	▲6.0%
1931	2,426	▲11.2%
1921	2,182	▲10.1%
1911	1,981	▼0.4%
1901	1,989	▼0.3%
1891	1,994	▲9.8%
1881	1,816	▲7.1%
1871	1,695	▲29.5%
1861	1,309	N/A

=== Language ===
Mother tongue language (2021)

Language	Population	Pct (%)
French only	1,805	98.4%
English only	5	0.3%
Both English and French	10	0.5%
Other languages	10	0.5%

== See also ==
- List of parish municipalities in Quebec
