= Louise Thibault =

Canadian politician

Louise Thibault MP

Member of Parliament for Rimouski-Neigette—Témiscouata—Les Basques
- In office 2004–2008
- Preceded by: new riding
- Succeeded by: Claude Guimond

Personal details
- Born: May 28, 1946 (age 80) Montreal, Quebec, Canada
- Party: Independent
- Other political affiliations: Bloc Québécois (2004-2007)
- Profession: Public servant

Louise Thibault (French pronunciation: [lwiz tibo]; born 1946) is a Canadian politician. Born in Montreal, Quebec, Thibault was a city councillor in Le Bic in 2003, then was elected into the House of Commons of Canada in the 2004 Canadian federal election for the Bloc Québécois in the riding of Rimouski-Neigette—Témiscouata—Les Basques. A former senior public servant, Thibault was the Bloc's critic of the Minister of Public Works and Government Services.

Thibault resigned from the Bloc Québécois caucus on April 12, 2007 and sat as an independent. She cited disputes with party leader Gilles Duceppe, principally over same-sex marriage. One of the more socially conservative Bloc MPs, she opposed a vote to reopen debate on the issue. She ran in the 2008 election as an independent, but was defeated by Claude Guimond, the new Bloc Québécois candidate.
