= Rimouski-Neigette Regional County Municipality =

Rimouski-Neigette
- Regional county municipality
- Coordinates: 48.33°N 68.67°W
- Country: Canada
- Province: Quebec
- Region: Bas-Saint-Laurent
- Effective: May 26, 1982
- County seat: Rimouski

Government
  - Type: Prefecture
  - Prefect: Francis Saint-Pierre

Area
  - Total: 2,946.10 km^{2} (1,137.50 sq mi)
  - Land: 2,715.17 km^{2} (1,048.33 sq mi)

Population (2016)
  - Total: 56,650
  - Density: 20.9/km^{2} (54/sq mi)
  - Change 2011–2016: ▲2.8%
  - Dwellings: 28,811
- Time zone: UTC−5 (EST)
  - Summer (DST): UTC−4 (EDT)
- Area codes: 418 and 581
- Website: www.mrcrimouskineigette.qc.ca

Rimouski-Neigette (French pronunciation: [ʁimuski nɛʒɛt]) is a regional county municipality in the Bas-Saint-Laurent region of Quebec, Canada.

The county seat is in Rimouski.

== Subdivisions ==
There are 10 subdivisions within the RCM:

Cities & Towns (1)

- Rimouski

Municipalities (1)

- Esprit-Saint

Parishes (7)

- La Trinité-des-Monts
- Saint-Anaclet-de-Lessard
- Saint-Eugène-de-Ladrière
- Saint-Fabien
- Saint-Marcellin
- Saint-Narcisse-de-Rimouski
- Saint-Valérien

Unorganized Territory (1)

- Lac-Huron

== Demographics ==
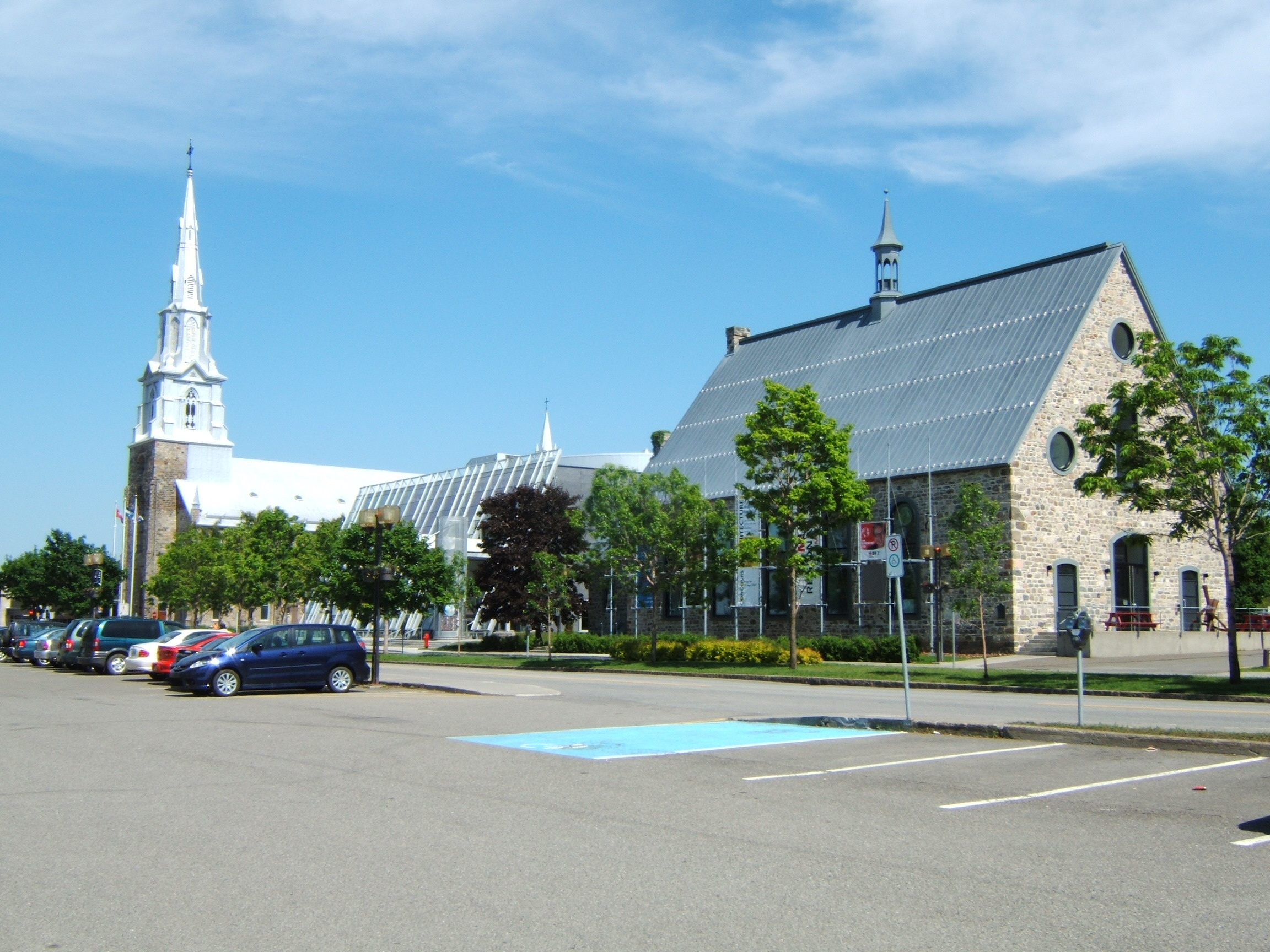
Rimouski

=== Population ===
Canada census – Rimouski-Neigette community profile

	2021	2016	2011
Population	57,191 (+1.0% from 2016)	56,650 (+2.8% from 2011)	55,095 (+3.6% from 2006)
Land area	2,703.99 km^{2} (1,044.02 sq mi)	2,715.17 km^{2} (1,048.33 sq mi)	2,716.52 km^{2} (1,048.85 sq mi)
Population density	21.2/km^{2} (55/sq mi)	20.9/km^{2} (54/sq mi)	20.3/km^{2} (53/sq mi)
Median age	47.2 (M: 45.6, F: 48.8)	47.3 (M: 45.0, F: 49.3)	46.2 (M: 44.4, F: 47.8)
Private dwellings	27,200 (total)	28,811 (total)	27,127 (total)
Median household income		$56,835	$50,891

References: 2021 2016 2011

Historical Census Data – Rimouski-Neigette Regional County Municipality, Quebec

Year	Pop.	±%
1991	51,290	—
1996	52,677	+2.7%
2001	52,289	−0.7%

Year	Pop.	±%
2006	53,193	+1.7%
2011	55,095	+3.6%
2016	56,650	+2.8%

=== Language ===
Canada Census Mother Tongue Language – Rimouski-Neigette Regional County Municipality
Census	Total	French			English			French & English			Other		
Year	Responses	Count	Trend	Pop %	Count	Trend	Pop %	Count	Trend	Pop %	Count	Trend	Pop %
2016	55,595	54,900	▲2.6%	98.11%	375	▲8.7%	0.67%	165	▲13.8%	0.29%	515	▲53.7%	0.92%
2011	54,320	53,495	▲4.8%	98.48%	345	▼9.2%	0.64%	145	▲52.6%	0.27%	335	▼48.1%	0.62%
2006	52,170	51,050	▲1.1%	97.85%	380	▲40.7%	0.73%	95	▲35.7%	0.18%	645	▲344.8%	1.24%
2001	50,975	50,490	▼1.4%	99.05%	270	▼35.7%	0.53%	70	▼46.2%	0.14%	145	▲11.5%	0.28%
1996	51,895	51,215	n/a	98.69%	420	n/a	0.81%	130	n/a	0.25%	130	n/a	0.25%

== Transportation ==
=== Access routes ===
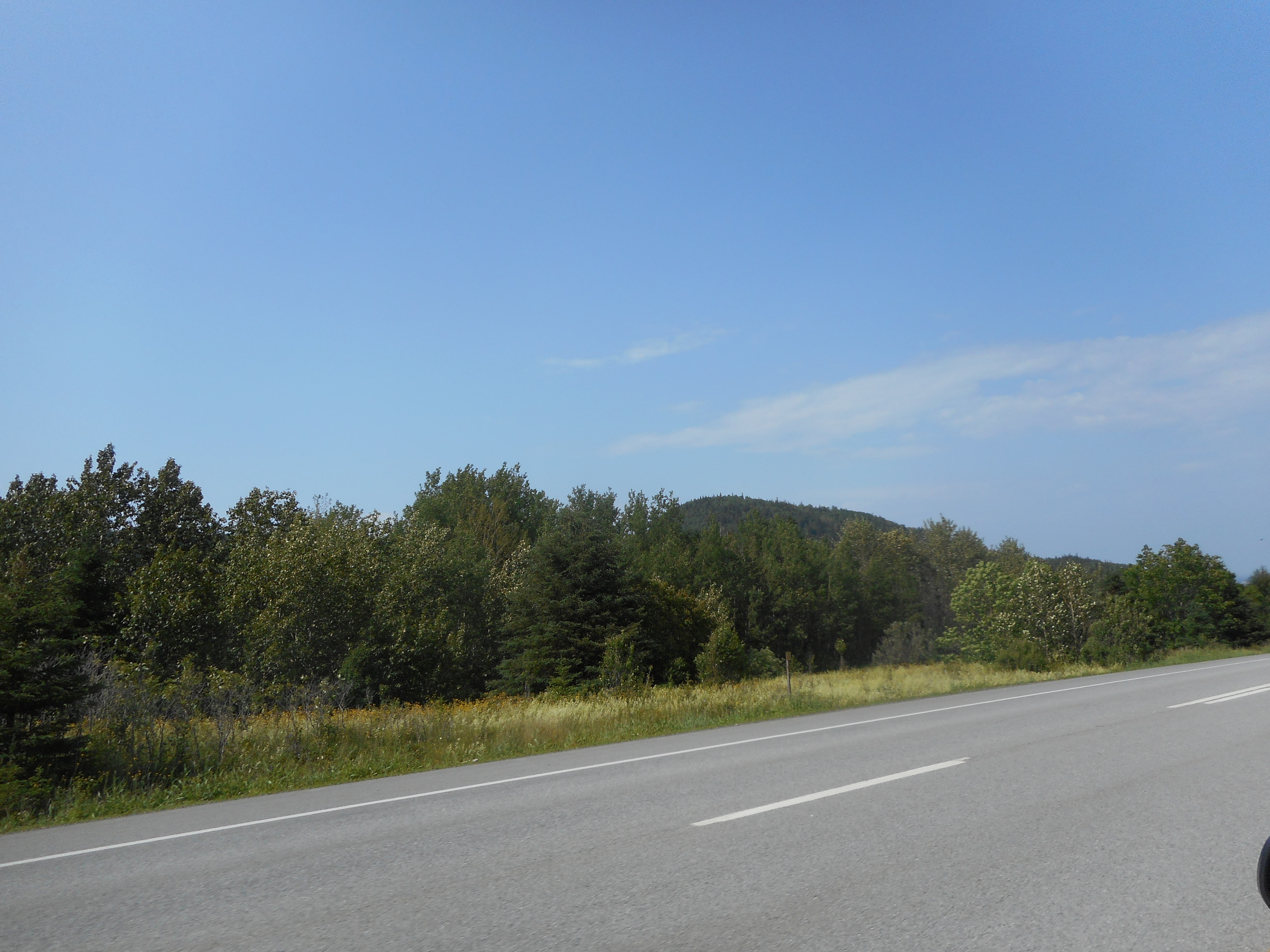
Quebec Route 132 in Rimouski

Highways and numbered routes that run through the municipality, including external routes that start or finish at the county border:

- Autoroutes
  - A-20
- Principal highways
  - R-132
- Secondary highways
  - R-232
  - R-234
- External routes
  - None

== See also ==
- List of regional county municipalities and equivalent territories in Quebec
- Rimouski Seignory
