= Rimouski-Neigette—Mitis—Matapédia—Les Basques =

Federal electoral district in Quebec, Canada

Coordinates: 47.94°N 68.51°W

Quebec electoral district
- Interactive map of riding boundaries from the 2025 federal election

Federal electoral district
- Legislature: House of Commons
MP
Maxime Blanchette-Joncas
Bloc Québécois
- District created: 2003
- First contested: 2004
- Last contested: 2025
- District webpage: profile, map

Demographics
- Population (2011): 84,809
- Electors (2015): 69,631
- Area (km²): 8,061
- Pop. density (per km²): 10.5
- Census division(s): La Matapédia, La Mitis, Les Basques, Rimouski-Neigette
- Census subdivision(s): Rimouski, Mont-Joli, Amqui, Trois-Pistoles, Saint-Anaclet-de-Lessard, Sainte-Luce, Causapscal, Saint-Fabien, Price, Sayabec

Rimouski-Neigette—Mitis—Matapédia—Les Basques (formerly known as Rimouski—La Matapédia and Rimouski-Neigette—Témiscouata—Les Basques) is a federal electoral district in Quebec, Canada, that has been represented in the House of Commons of Canada since 2004.

== Geography ==
This eastern Quebec riding includes the regional county municipalities of La Matapédia, La Mitis, Les Basques and Rimouski-Neigette, in the Quebec region of Bas-Saint-Laurent.

The neighbouring ridings are Côte-du-Sud—Rivière-du-Loup—Kataskomiq—Témiscouata, Côte-Nord—Kawawachikamach—Nitassinan, Gaspésie—Les Îles-de-la-Madeleine—Listuguj, and Madawaska—Restigouche.

== History ==
Rimouski-Neigette—Témiscouata—Les Basques was created in 2003 as "Rimouski—Témiscouata" from parts of Kamouraska—Rivière-du-Loup—Témiscouata—Les Basques and Rimouski-Neigette-et-La Mitis ridings. The district was given its present name in 2004.

Rimouski-Neigette—Témiscouata—Les Basques was a safe seat for Bloc Québécois until 2011, when New Democrat Guy Caron, an unsuccessful candidate in 2004, 2006 and 2008, unexpectedly won the riding in an NDP wave that swept throughout Quebec.

There was a proposal to change the riding's name to Centre-du-Bas-Saint-Laurent following the Canadian federal electoral redistribution, 2012; however, Parliament voted against this change. There were no territory changes to this riding as a result of the 2012 federal electoral redistribution.

Following the 2022 Canadian federal electoral redistribution, the riding was merged with Avignon—La Mitis—Matane—Matapédia, becoming Rimouski—La Matapédia. The new riding consisted of Les Basques and Rimouski-Neigette Regional County Municipalities (taken from Rimouski-Neigette—Témiscouata—Les Basques) and La Mitis and La Matapédia Regional County Municipalities from Avignon—La Mitis—Matane—Matapédia.

In 2026, the riding's name was changed to Rimouski-Neigette—Mitis—Matapédia—Les Basques as part of Bill C-25 of the 45th Canadian Parliament.

=== Members of Parliament ===
This riding has elected the following members of Parliament:

Parliament	Years	Member	Party
Rimouski-Neigette—Témiscouata—Les Basques; Riding created from Kamouraska—Rivière-du-Loup—Témiscouata—Les Basques and Rimouski-Neigette-et-La Mitis
38th	2004–2006	Louise Thibault	Bloc Québécois
39th	2006–2007	Louise Thibault	Bloc Québécois
39th	2007–2008	Louise Thibault	Independent
40th	2008–2011	Claude Guimond	Bloc Québécois
41st	2011–2015	Guy Caron	New Democratic
42nd	2015–2019	Guy Caron	New Democratic
43rd	2019–2021	Maxime Blanchette-Joncas	Bloc Québécois
44th	2021–2025	Maxime Blanchette-Joncas	Bloc Québécois
Rimouski—La Matapédia incorporating parts of Avignon—La Mitis—Matane—Matapédia
45th	2025–present	Maxime Blanchette-Joncas	Bloc Québécois

== Election results ==
=== Rimouski—La Matapédia ===
2025 Canadian federal election: Rimouski—La Matapédia
Party	Candidate	Votes	%	±%	Expenditures
Bloc Québécois	Maxime Blanchette-Joncas	24,608	46.28	–8.02	$49,301.33
Liberal	Alexander Reford	18,846	35.44	+13.36	$0.00
Conservative	Nancy Joannette	7,201	13.54	+2.34	$3,366.52
New Democratic	Salomé Salvain	946	1.78	–4.08	$0.00
Independent	Noémi Bureau-Civil	608	1.14	–1.87	$206.91
People's	Taraneh Javanbakht	337	0.63	–1.43	$0.00
Rhinoceros	Lysane Picker-Paquin	295	0.55	N/A	$0.00
Independent	Raphaël Arsenault	239	0.45	N/A	$39.77
Independent	Tommy Lefebvre	95	0.18	N/A	$47.62
Total valid votes/expense limit		–	–	–	$136,608.81
Total rejected ballots		–			
Turnout		53,175	63.20		
Eligible voters		84,140			
Bloc Québécois notional hold		Swing		–10.69	
Source: Elections Canada

2021 federal election redistributed results
Party	Vote	%
Bloc Québécois	26,658	54.30
Liberal	10,842	22.08
Conservative	5,497	11.20
New Democratic	2,876	5.86
People's	1,010	2.06
Others	2,215	4.51

=== Rimouski-Neigette—Témiscouata—Les Basques ===
2021 Canadian federal election: Rimouski-Neigette—Témiscouata—Les Basques
Party	Candidate	Votes	%	±%	Expenditures
Bloc Québécois	Maxime Blanchette-Joncas	20,657	49.0	+11.2	$29,861.18
Liberal	Léonie Lajoie	10,482	24.9	+2.8	$9,539.74
Conservative	France Gagnon	5,569	13.2	+4.3	$3,704.22
New Democratic	Sylvain Lajoie	2,641	6.3	-22.2	$621.60
Independent	Noémi Bureau-Civil	1,467	3.5	N/A	$2,245.90
People's	Jean Tardy	700	1.7	+1.2	$2,383.86
Free	Michel Raymond	430	1.0	N/A	$301.03
Rhinoceros	Megan Hodges	192	0.5	+0.1	$0.00
Total valid votes/expense limit		42,138	98.0	–	$110,576.53
Total rejected ballots		881	2.0		
Turnout		43,019	61.1		
Registered voters		70,467			
Bloc Québécois hold		Swing		+4.2	
Source: Elections Canada

2019 Canadian federal election: Rimouski-Neigette—Témiscouata—Les Basques
Party	Candidate	Votes	%	±%	Expenditures
Bloc Québécois	Maxime Blanchette-Joncas	17,314	37.8	+18.50	$13,984.50
New Democratic	Guy Caron	13,050	28.5	-14.61	none listed
Liberal	Chantal Pilon	10,095	22.1	-5.92	$42,899.50
Conservative	Nancy Brassard-Fortin	4,073	8.9	+1.42	$13,507.19
Green	Jocelyn Rioux	824	1.8	+0.31	none listed
People's	Pierre Lacombe	232	0.50	New	none listed
Rhinoceros	Lysane Picker-Paquin	179	0.4	-0.21	none listed
Total valid votes/expense limit		45,767	100.0		
Total rejected ballots		758			
Turnout		46,525	66.5		
Eligible voters		69,939			
Bloc Québécois gain from New Democratic		Swing		+16.56	
Source: Elections Canada

There were no territory changes for the 42nd Canadian federal election.

2015 Canadian federal election
Party	Candidate	Votes	%	±%	Expenditures
New Democratic	Guy Caron	19,374	43.11	+0.13	$35,673.90
Liberal	Pierre Cadieux	12,594	28.02	+18.42	$17,003.50
Bloc Québécois	Johanne Carignan	8,673	19.30	-11.53	$16,944.09
Conservative	Francis Fortin	3,361	7.48	-7.08	$4,751.28
Green	Louise Boutin	669	1.49	-0.54	–
Rhinoceros	Sébastien CôRhino Côrriveau	274	0.61	–	$41.32
Total valid votes/Expense limit		44,837	100.0		$211,200.56
Total rejected ballots		–	–	–	
Turnout		–	–	–	
Eligible voters		69,631			
New Democratic hold		Swing		-0.02	
Source: Elections Canada

2011 Canadian federal election
Party	Candidate	Votes	%	±%	Expenditures
New Democratic	Guy Caron	18,360	42.98	+32.65	$1,454.82
Bloc Québécois	Claude Guimond	13,170	30.83	-13.85	$37,084.15
Conservative	Bertin Denis	6,218	14.56	-3.70	$48,523.44
Liberal	Pierre Cadieux	4,101	9.60	-10.49	$12,947.19
Green	Clément Pelletier	867	2.03	+0.40	none listed
Total valid votes/Expense limit		42,716	100.0		$86,716.92
Total rejected, unmarked and declined ballots		449	1.04	-0.13	
Turnout		43,165	62.90	+4.17	
Eligible voters		68,625			
New Democratic gain from Bloc Québécois		Swing		+23.25	

2008 Canadian federal election
Party	Candidate	Votes	%	±%	Expenditures
Bloc Québécois	Claude Guimond	17,652	44.68	-1.70	$26,530.06
Liberal	Pierre Béland	7,937	20.09	+0.76	$16,213.11
Conservative	Gaston Noël	7,216	18.26	-3.94	$50,736.77
New Democratic	Guy Caron	4,085	10.33	+0.53	$8,921.06
Independent	Louise Thibault	1,966	4.97	–	$10,441.59
Green	James D. Morrison	645	1.63	-0.65	none listed
Total valid votes/Expense limit		39,501	100.0		$83,533
Total rejected, unmarked and declined ballots		468	1.17	-0.05	
Turnout		39,969	58.73	-5.03	
Eligible voters		68,055			
Bloc Québécois hold		Swing		-1.23	
Independent candidate Louise Thibault was previously elected as a member of the Bloc Québécois, and lost 41.41 percentage points from her results in the 2006 election.

2006 Canadian federal election
Party	Candidate	Votes	%	±%	Expenditures
Bloc Québécois	Louise Thibault	19,804	46.38	-11.25	$37,738.52
Conservative	Roger Picard	9,481	22.20	+13.26	$15,575.69
Liberal	Michel Tremblay	8,254	19.33	-4.44	$54,457.05
New Democratic	Guy Caron	4,186	9.80	+2.75	$15,288.40
Green	François Bédard	973	2.28	-0.34	$30.76
Total valid votes/Expense limit		42,698	100.0		$77,697
Total rejected, unmarked and declined ballots		529	1.22	-0.68	
Turnout		43,227	63.76	+5.71	
Eligible voters		67,793			
Bloc Québécois hold		Swing		-12.26	

2004 Canadian federal election
Party	Candidate	Votes	%	±%	Expenditures
Bloc Québécois	Louise Thibault	22,215	57.63	-2.77	$37,917.81
Liberal	Côme Roy	9,161	23.77	-5.96	$52,950.93
Conservative	Denis Quimper	3,445	8.94	+2.10	$14,150.40
New Democratic	Guy Caron	2,717	7.05	+5.10	$6,486.64
Green	Marjolaine Delaunière	1,008	2.62	–	none listed
Total valid votes/Expense limit		38,546	100.0		$75,927
Total rejected, unmarked and declined ballots		747	1.90		
Turnout		39,293	58.05	-0.46	
Eligible voters		67,686			
Bloc Québécois notional hold		Swing		+1.60	
Changes from 2000 are based on redistributed results. Change for the Conservatives is based on the combined total of the Progressive Conservatives and the Canadian Alliance.

2000 federal election redistributed results
Party	Vote	%
Bloc Québécois	23,583	60.40
Liberal	11,609	29.73
Progressive Conservative	1,343	3.44
Alliance	1,327	3.40
New Democratic	762	1.95
Others	418	1.07

== See also ==
- List of Canadian electoral districts
- Historical federal electoral districts of Canada
