= Brisson River (Rimouski River tributary) =

Location
- Country: Canada
- Province: Quebec
- Region: Bas-Saint-Laurent
- MRC: Rimouski-Neigette Regional County Municipality

Physical characteristics
- Source: Mountain stream
  - location: La Trinité-des-Monts
  - coordinates: 48°11′54″N 68°21′57″W
  - elevation: 413 m (1,355 ft)
- Mouth: Rimouski River
  - location: La Trinité-des-Monts
  - coordinates: 48°09′16″N 68°25′34″W
  - elevation: 173 m (568 ft)
- Length: 8.4 km (5.2 mi)

Basin features
- Tributaries
  - left: (upstream) Grand Matinal stream, Petit Lac outlet in Nazaire
  - right: (upstream) Coulée Laurent

The Brisson River (French: Rivière Brisson) is a tributary of Rimouski River, flowing in the municipality of La Trinité-des-Monts, in the Rimouski-Neigette Regional County Municipality, in the region administrative Bas-Saint-Laurent, in the province of Quebec, in Canada.

Taken from its source on the northern slope of Mont Longue-Vue, the Brisson River descends from the mountains in a small deep valley to a plain where it flows on the east bank of the Rimouski River. The latter winds its way west, then heads north, to the south bank of the St. Lawrence River where it pours into the heart of the city of Rimouski.

== Geography ==
The Brisson river takes its source from a mountain flow in the North-East part of the municipality of La Trinité-des-Monts, on the northern slope of "Mont Longue-vue" in the Zec du Bas-Saint-Laurent. This source is located at:

- 29.4 km (18.3 mi) to the southeast of the southeast coast of the St. Lawrence River;
- 0.5 km (0.31 mi) Southwest of the limit of the unorganized territory of Lac-Huron;
- 11.3 km (7.0 mi) South-East of the village center of Saint-Narcisse-de-Rimouski;
- 4.7 km (2.9 mi) South-East of the limit of the municipality of Saint-Narcisse-de-Rimouski.

From the mouth of its source, the Brisson river flows over 8.4 km (5.2 mi), divided into the following segments:

- 4.9 km (3.0 mi) towards the South-West, in the municipality of La Trinité-des-Monts, until the confluence of Coulée Laurent (coming from the North-West);
- 3.0 km (1.9 mi) towards the South-West, until the confluence of the "Grand Matinal stream" (coming from the South-East);
- 0.5 km (0.31 mi) towards the North-West, leaving zec du Bas-Saint-Laurent, until the confluence of the river.

The Brisson river flows on the east bank of the Rimouski River, in La Trinité-des-Monts. This confluence is located at:

- 5.5 km (3.4 mi) to the North-East downstream from the bend of the river which is located to the East of the center of the village of La Trinité-des-Monts;
- 1.1 km (0.68 mi) upstream from the Red Bridge (Chemin du Pont Rouge);
- 34.4 km (21.4 mi) south-east of the south-east coast of the St. Lawrence River;
- 14.1 km (8.8 mi) south of the village center of Saint-Narcisse-de-Rimouski;
- 4.5 km (2.8 mi) north-east of the village center of La Trinité-des-Monts.

== Toponymy ==
The term "Brison" constitutes a family name of French origin.

The toponym "Rivière Brisson" was formalized on December 5, 1968, at the Commission de toponymie du Québec.

== See also ==
- List of rivers of Quebec
