= East Patapédia River =

Location
- Country: Canada
- Province: Quebec
- Administrative region: Bas-Saint-Laurent

Physical characteristics
- Source
  - location: forest streams, Lac-des-Eaux-Mortes, Quebec, Bas-Saint-Laurent, Quebec
  - coordinates: 48°13′19″N 67°46′43″W
  - elevation: 458 m (1,503 ft)
- Mouth
  - location: Boundary between unorganized territories of Lac-des-Eaux-Mortes, Quebec and Ruisseau-Ferguson, Quebec
  - coordinates: 48°04′40″N 67°38′07″W
  - elevation: 214 m (702 ft)
- Length: 25.2 km (15.7 mi)

Basin features
- Tributaries
  - right: (from the mouth) Dunville brook, Grey brook

The East Patapédia River runs in the unorganized territory of Lac-des-Eaux-Mortes, Quebec, in La Matapedia Regional County Municipality (RCM), in the administrative region of Bas-Saint-Laurent, in Quebec, in Canada.

This stream flows in the forest zone to the southeast. The upper part of the valley is an extension to the south of the Lake Mitis valley. A segment of 8.8 kilometres (5.5 mi) south of the hamlet "30 Miles" is the eastern boundary of the Zec du Bas-Saint-Laurent.

East Patapedia River flows on the north bank of the Patapédia River which flows southeast to the west bank of the Restigouche River. The latter, in turn, flows east to the west bank of the Chaleur Bay which opens to the east on the Gulf of Saint Lawrence.

The upper part of the river is served on the North side by the "route du 30 Milles" (English: road of 30 Miles), from Saint-Zenon-du-Lac-Humqui, Quebec and the west side by the forest roads of the Zec du Bas-Saint-Laurent. The lower portion is served by the forest road from the village "Le Dépôt" (English: The deposit), located in the unorganized territory of Ruisseau-Ferguson, Quebec.

== Geography ==
Patapedia East River originates in forest area located in the unorganized territory of Lac-des-Eaux-Mortes, Quebec, between the northern limit of the Zec du Bas-Saint-Laurent and Lake Mitis, Quebec.

This source is located at:

- 4.7 kilometres (2.9 mi) southwest of Lake Mitis;
- 16.7 kilometres (10.4 mi) northwest from the confluence of the "East River Patapédia";
- 63.3 kilometres (39.3 mi) east of the mouth of Lake Mistigougèche;
- 56.8 kilometres (35.3 mi) southeast of the southeast coast of Gulf of Saint Lawrence.

The river flows east Patapédia 25.2 kilometres (15.7 mi) generally toward the southeast, entirely in forest land.

From its source, the "Patapédia East River" flows on 25.2 kilometres (15.7 mi)

- 5.9 kilometres (3.7 mi) to the Southeast, up to a stream (coming from the north);
- 1.7 kilometres (1.1 mi) to the Southeast, up to a stream (coming from the southwest);
- 2.8 kilometres (1.7 mi) to the east in a curve to the north, up to a stream (coming from the north) which drains the southeastern Lake Mitis (Lake section Superior). Note: Mitis lake has two emissaries, the most important is the Northwest side; the emissary of the south side (the section of Lake Superior) flows south to join the "East Patapédia River";
- 4.9 kilometres (3.0 mi) to the Southeast, up to Grey Creek (coming from the west); the confluence is located near the forest road bridge;
- 3.7 kilometres (2.3 mi) to the southeast, up to the west boundary of the Township of Roncesvalles;
- 2.8 kilometres (1.7 mi) to the southeast, forming the boundary of the Township of Roncesvalles and Zec du Bas-Saint-Laurent up to Dunville stream (coming from the southwest);
- 3.4 kilometres (2.1 mi) to the southeast, up to the confluence of the river

The confluence of "East Patapédia River" is on the north bank of the Patapédia River, on the eastern edge of the Zec du Bas-Saint-Laurent and the unorganized territory of Ruisseau-Ferguson, Quebec (township of Roncesvalles).

This confluence is located:

- 6.1 kilometres (3.8 mi) upstream of the confluence of the Meadow River (coming from the north);
- 8.6 kilometres (5.3 mi) north of the limit of New Brunswick;
- 32.2 kilometres (20.0 mi) northwest from the confluence of the Patapédia River.

== Toponymy ==
The toponym "Patapedia River East" was formalized on December 5, 1968, at the Commission de toponymie du Québec (Geographical Quebec Names Board).

== See also ==
- La Mitis Regional County Municipality (RCM)
- Lac-des-Eaux-Mortes, Quebec, an unorganized territory
- Ruisseau-Ferguson, Quebec, an unorganized territory
- Restigouche River, a stream
- Patapédia River, a stream
- Zec du Bas-Saint-Laurent, a Controlled harvesting zone (ZEC)
