= Rimouski (disambiguation) =

Rimouski is a city in Bas-Saint-Laurent region of Quebec, Canada.

Rimouski may also refer to:

- Rimouski (provincial electoral district), a provincial electoral district of Quebec
- Rimouski (federal electoral district), a former federal electoral district in Canada
- Rimouski Airport
- Rimouski River, a river in Quebec
- Roman Catholic Archdiocese of Rimouski
- HMCS Rimouski

== See also ==
- Rimouski-Neigette, a Regional County Municipality
- Rimouski-Neigette—Témiscouata—Les Basques, a federal riding of Canada
- Université du Québec à Rimouski
- Zec de la Rivière-Rimouski, a zone d'exploitation contrôlée (controlled harvesting zone)
