= Gamache River (Rivière du Bic) =

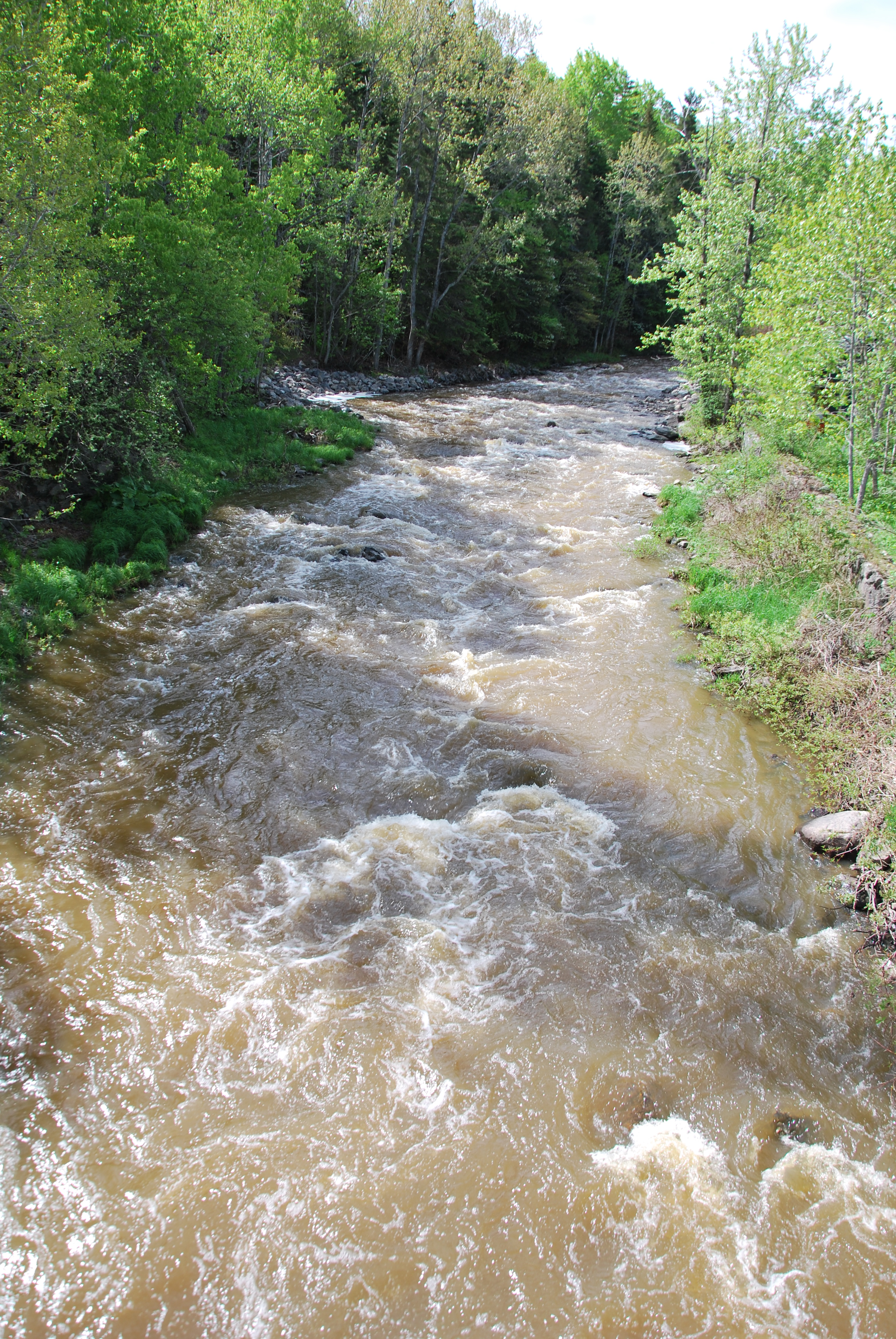

Location
- Country: Canada
- Province: Quebec
- Region: Bas-Saint-Laurent
- Regional County Municipality: Rimouski-Neigette Regional County Municipality

Physical characteristics
- Source: Agricultural streams
  - location: Saint-Valérien
  - coordinates: 48°20′43″N 68°36′43″W
  - elevation: 207 m (679 ft)
- Mouth: Gulf of Saint Lawrence
  - location: Rimouski (sector Le Bic)
  - coordinates: 48°19′23″N 68°42′44″W
  - elevation: 119 m (390 ft)
- Length: 14.2 km (8.8 mi)

Basin features
- Tributaries
  - left: (upstream) Discharge of Lake Truite.
  - right: (upstream) Raphaël Stream, Beaulieu Stream, North Branch.

The Gamache River is a watercourse flowing successively in the municipality of Saint-Valérien and the Le Bic sector of the town of Rimouski, in the Rimouski-Neigette Regional County Municipality, in the administrative region of Bas-Saint-Laurent, in Quebec, Canada.

The Gamache River is a tributary on the east bank of the rivière du Bic, which flows northeast to the southeast coast of the Saint Lawrence River and flows into the city of Rimouski.

== Geography ==
The Gamache River takes its source from agricultural and forest streams in the fifth rang East, in Saint-Valérien, in the Notre Dame Mountains. This spring is located at 5.9 km (3.7 mi) southeast of the southeastern coast of the estuary of Saint Lawrence, at 5.9 km (3.7 mi) northeast of the center of the village of Saint-Valérien, at 8.6 km (5.3 mi) east of the center of the village of Le Bic, at 3.6 km (2.2 mi) west of the Rimouski River.

The Gamache River flows over 14.2 km (8.8 mi) divided into the following segments:

- 1.8 km (1.1 mi) southwesterly, up to the fifth Rang Est road;
- 1.5 km (0.93 mi) to the southwest, crossing under the Gendreau road bridge, to the confluence of the outlet (coming from the northeast) of a small lake (altitude: 234 m (768 ft));
- 3.0 km (1.9 mi) towards the south-west, collecting water from several streams, up to the Central road;
- 1.6 km (0.99 mi) towards the south-west, up to the confluence of the outlet (coming from the south-west) of Lac de la Pelle;
- 0.4 km (0.25 mi) northward, up to the confluence of the Raphaël stream (coming from the northeast);
- 1.1 km (0.68 mi) north-west, collecting water from the Lafrenière watercourse (coming from the west), to the bridge on Chemin du fourth rang West (main Street);
- 0.2 km (0.12 mi) northeasterly, to the limit of Le Bic of the city of Rimouski;
- 2.9 km (1.8 mi) west, up to the "Montée Joseph-D'Astous" road;
- 1.7 km (1.1 mi) westward, up to its confluence.

The Gamache River flows into a bend in the river on the east bank of the Bic River in the Le Bic sector of the city of Rimouski. This confluence is located 1.7 km (1.1 mi) upstream of the bridge on the third rang road of Bic and downstream of the confluence of the outlet of Lac Vaseux. This confluence is also located at 4.9 km (3.0 mi) southeast of the southeast coast of the Saint Lawrence Estuary.

== Toponymy ==
The term "Gamache" constitutes a family name of French origin.

The toponym "rivière Gamache" was formalized on December 5, 1968, at the Commission de toponymie du Québec.

== See also ==
- Estuary of Saint Lawrence
- Rivière du Bic, a stream
- Saint-Valérien, a municipality
- Le Bic, a sector of the city of Rimouski
- Rimouski, a city
- Rimouski-Neigette Regional County Municipality
