= Kedgwick River =

Location
- Country: Canada
- Provinces: New Brunswick and Quebec

Physical characteristics
- Source
  - location: Lac-Huron, Quebec (unorganized territory), MRC Rimouski-Neigette, Bas-Saint-Laurent, Quebec
  - coordinates: 48°06′29″N 68°06′25″W
  - elevation: 296 m (971 ft)
- Mouth
  - location: Grimmer Parish, Restigouche County, New Brunswick
  - coordinates: 47°39′57″N 67°29′40″W
  - elevation: 121 m (397 ft)
- Length: 80.8 km (50.2 mi)

Basin features
- Tributaries
  - left: (from the confluence) in New Brunswick: One Mile Brook, Whitewater Brook, Bowman Brook, Lower Eight Mile Brook, Whalens Gulch, McDougall Brook, States Brook; special segment North Branch Kedgwick River: Two mile Brook, Three mile Brook, Four Mile Brook, Six Mile Brook; in Quebec: Keg brook, Murray brook, discharge of Lake Engault.
  - right: (from the confluence) in New Brunswick: Two Mile Brook, Falls Brook, Upper Eight Mile Brook, Clearwater Brook, Black Brook, Fogs Brook, Longs Gulch, South Branch Kedgwick River, Belle Kedgwick River, Falls Gulch, Five mile Brook, Gin creek; in Quebec: Quigley brook, Berry Brook.

The Kedgwick River is a tributary of the head of the Restigouche River, in New Brunswick, in Canada. It flows southeast in:

- Quebec: in the unorganized territory of Lac-Huron, Quebec, in regional county municipality (MRC) Rimouski-Neigette, in the administrative region of Bas-Saint-Laurent;
- New Brunswick: Saint-Quentin and Grimmer Parish, in Restigouche County.

== Geography ==
Kedgwick River rises at the mouth of the Little Lake Kedgwick (length: 2.0 kilometres (1.2 mi); height: 296 metres (971 ft)), located in the Northeastern part of the Réserve faunique de Rimouski (Rimouski Wildlife Reserve), in Notre Dame Mountains, in province of Quebec. The Little Lake Kedgwick is powered by the creek of "Lac à Poil" (coming from the North).

The mouth of the Little Lake Kedgwick is located at:

- 10.8 kilometres (6.7 mi) Southeast and 7.6 kilometres (4.7 mi) Southwest of the border between Quebec and New Brunswick;
- 5.6 kilometres (3.5 mi) Southwest of the summit of the "mountain à Dubé" top;
- 2.7 kilometres (1.7 mi) Southwest of the summit of the "mountain du Lac Perdu" (mountain of Lost Lake);
- 50.6 kilometres (31.4 mi) Southeast of Rimouski downtown;
- 70.0 kilometres (43.5 mi) Northwest of the confluence of the Kedgwick River.

From its source, the "Kedgwick River" flows on 80.8 kilometres (50.2 mi) according these segments:

Upper course of the river, flowing in Quebec (segment of 22.8 kilometres (14.2 mi))

From the mouth of the Little Lake Kedgwick, Kedgwick River flows on:

- 0.3 kilometres (0.19 mi) to the Southwest in the unorganized territory of Lac-Huron, Quebec, in MRC of (Rimouski-Neigette, in Quebec), up to Northwest shore of Grand Lake Kedgwick;
- 3.7 kilometres (2.3 mi) to the Southeast, up to the mouth of Grand Lake Kedgwick;
- 11.6 kilometres (7.2 mi) to the Southeast up to Murray Creek (from the North);
- 2.1 kilometres (1.3 mi) southward, up to Quigley Creek (from the West);
- 3.4 kilometres (2.1 mi) to the Southeast up to Keg Creek (from the East);
- 1.7 kilometres (1.1 mi) to the Southeast, passing at the Southwest of the "Montagne de la Tour" (Mountain of the Tower), up to the border between Quebec and New Brunswick.

Upper course of the river, flowing in New Brunswick (segment of 14.1 kilometres (8.8 mi)).

From the border of Quebec - New Brunswick, this river segment that is designated North Branch Kedgwick River, which runs on:

- 2.8 kilometres (1.7 mi) to the Southeast in the Saint-Quentin, in Restigouche County, in New Brunswick up to Gin Creek (from the Northwest);
- 3.2 kilometres (2.0 mi) to the Southeast, up to the "Devils Elbow Rapids";
- 7.2 kilometres (4.5 mi) to the South, making a detour to the East up to the Belle Kedgwick River (from the West);
- 0.9 kilometres (0.56 mi) to the South-East, up to the South Branch Kedgwick River (from the Southwest);

Middle course of the river (segment of 14.4 kilometres (8.9 mi))

From the confluence of the North Branch Kedgwick River and South Branch Kedgwick River, designated "Kedgwick Forks", the Kedgwick River flows:

- 4.5 kilometres (2.8 mi) to the Southeast, up to States Brook (from the North);
- 6.4 kilometres (4.0 mi) to the Southeast until Fogs Brook (from the West);
- 3.5 kilometres (2.2 mi) Eastward, crossing the "Rapids Depot", up to McDougall Brook (from the North).

Lower course of the river (segment of 29.5 kilometres (18.3 mi))

From the confluence of McDougall Brook, the "Kedgwick River" flows on:

- 8.5 kilometres (5.3 mi) to the Southeast in the Saint-Quentin Parish up to Whalens Brook (from the North);
- 4.5 kilometres (2.8 mi) to the Southeast, up to Clearwater Brook (from the West);
- 3.1 kilometres (1.9 mi) to the Southeast up to Upper Eight Mile Brook (discharge of Eightmile Lake);
- 0.9 kilometres (0.56 mi) Eastward up to Lower Eight Mile Brook (from the North);
- 2.4 kilometres (1.5 mi) Eastward up to Bowman Brook (from the North);
- 0.8 kilometres (0.50 mi) to the South, up to Falls Brook (from the Southwest);
- 2.3 kilometres (1.4 mi) to the Southeast, up to the limit of the Grimmer Parish;
- 1.9 kilometres (1.2 mi) to the East in the Grimmer Parish, passing south of the "Kedgwick Game Management Area" until Whitewater Brook (from the North);
- 3.7 kilometres (2.3 mi) to the Southeast, up to Mike Brook (from the North);
- 1.4 kilometres (0.87 mi) to the Southeast, bypassing the Island Half-Mile, up to the confluence of "Kedgwick River".

The "Kedgwick River" flows into a river bend on the West bank of the Restigouche River. Kedgwick River and Little Main Restigouche River have the same confluence, which is located in the hamlet Kedgwick River.

The confluence of the Kedgwick River is located at:

- 11.2 kilometres (7.0 mi) West of Kedgwick village center;
- 20.7 kilometres (12.9 mi) South of the confluence of the Patapédia River, which is located at the border between Quebec and New Brunswick;
- 74.4 kilometres (46.2 mi) Southwest of Campbellton, New Brunswick bridge, crossing the Restigouche River.

== Toponymy ==
The term Kedgwick refers to various names of Northwest of New Brunswick and South of the Gaspé Peninsula in Quebec, including Kedgwick River (and several of its tributaries), the municipality, the river fork, the great lake, the little lake, preservation zones and a walking trail.

The term Kedgwick comes from the word madawamkedjwik, meaning in Mi'kmaq "large branch" or "flowing under the earth".

The place name "Kedgwick River" was formalized on December 5, 1968, at the Commission de toponymie du Québec (Quebec Names Board).

== See also ==
- Rimouski-Neigette, a regional county municipality (MRC)
- Restigouche County
- List of rivers of Quebec
- List of rivers of New Brunswick
- Chaleur Bay
- Gulf of Saint Lawrence
- Restigouche River
- Little Main Restigouche River
- Belle Kedgwick River
- South Branch Kedgwick River
- Lac-Huron, Quebec, an unorganized territory
- Saint-Quentin
- Grimmer Parish
- Réserve faunique de Rimouski (Rimouski Wildlife Reserve)
