= Gamache =

Gamache is a surname. Notable people with the surname include:

- Joey Gamache (born 1966), American boxer
- Justinne Gamache, American singer
- Simon Gamache (born 1981), Canadian ice hockey player

== Fictional characters ==
- Henri Gamache, pseudonym of an otherwise unknown folk magic author of the 1940s
- Chief Inspector Armand Gamache, the main character in a series of mystery novels written by Canadian author Louise Penny

== See also ==
- Gamache River (disambiguation)
