= Belle Kedgwick River =

Location
- Country: Canada

Physical characteristics
- Source
  - location: Saint-Quentin Parish, Restigouche County, New Brunswick
  - coordinates: 47°55′53″N 68°05′40″W
  - elevation: 436 m (1,430 ft)
- Mouth
  - location: Saint-Quentin Parish, Restigouche County, New Brunswick
  - coordinates: 47°54′22″N 68°18′11″W
  - elevation: 211 m (692 ft)
- Length: 18.3 km (11.4 mi)

Basin features
- Tributaries
  - left: (from the confluence) Indian Gulch, McDonald Gulch, LeBlanc Gulch.
  - right: (from the confluence) Six Mile Gulch, Fire Trail Branch.

The Belle Kedgwick River flows in Saint-Quentin Parish, Restigouche County, New Brunswick, Canada.

The river is a tributary of the west bank of the Kedgwick River, which flows southeast to the west bank of the Restigouche River; the latter flows north to the border of Quebec, then east to the west bank of the Chaleur Bay where it opens to the east on the Gulf of Saint Lawrence.

== Geography ==
The Belle Kedgwick River begins in a marshy area in the northwest region of New Brunswick.

The source of the River Belle Kedgwick is:

- 2.0 kilometres (1.2 mi) east of the border between Quebec and New Brunswick
- 13.7 kilometres (8.5 mi) west of the confluence of the River Belle Kedgwick
- 66.9 kilometres (41.6 mi) north of Edmundston downtown

The course of the river flows on the north side of the South Branch Kedgwick River course.

From its source, the river flows on 18.3 kilometres (11.4 mi)

- 5.3 kilometres (3.3 mi) to the southeast in Saint-Quentin Parish up to Fire Trail Branch (from the west). Note: This segment is called Branch Middle Belle Kedgwick River
- 1.8 kilometres (1.1 mi) to the northeast, up to LeBlanc Gulch (from northwest)
- 1.9 kilometres (1.2 mi) to the southeast, up to Six Mile Gulch (from the west)
- 4.7 kilometres (2.9 mi) to the northeast, up to McDonald Gulch (from the north)
- 1.5 kilometres (0.93 mi) eastward up to Indian Gulch (from northwest)
- 3.1 kilometres (1.9 mi) to the southeast, up to the confluence of the River Belle Kedgwick.

The Belle Kedgwick River flows on the west bank of the Kedgwick River, in the forest zone.

The confluence of the River Belle Kedgwick is:

- 43.8 kilometres (27.2 mi) northwest from the confluence of the Kedgwick River
- 71.3 kilometres (44.3 mi) northeast of Edmundston centre
- 9.5 kilometres (5.9 mi) south of the border between Quebec and New Brunswick
- 0.9 kilometres (0.56 mi) upstream of the confluence of the South Branch Kedgwick River (from the southwest)

== See also ==
- List of rivers of New Brunswick
