= Gamache River =

Gamache River may refer to:

- Gamache River (Anticosti Island), a tributary of the Gulf of Saint Lawrence in Anticosti Island, Quebec, Canada
- Gamache River (Rivière du Bic), a river in the Saint Lawrence River drainage basin in the town of Rimouski, Quebec, Canada
