= Kedgwick =

Kedgwick may refer to:

- Kedgwick, New Brunswick, a rural community in Restigouche County, New Brunswick
- Kedgwick River, a body of water in New Brunswick
