= Lac-des-Eaux-Mortes, Quebec =

Lac-des-Eaux-Mortes
- Unorganized Territory
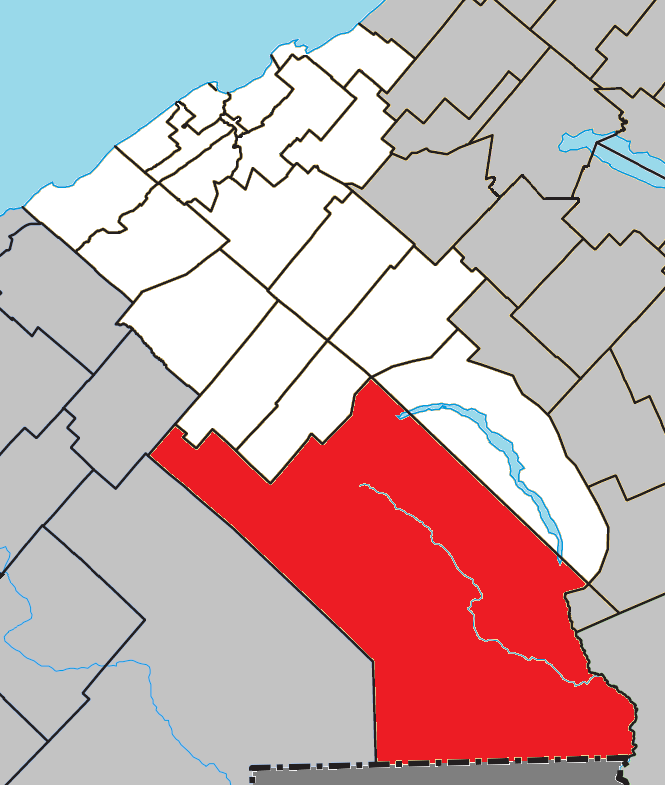
- Location within La Mitis RCM.

- Location in eastern Quebec.
- Coordinates: 48°14′N 68°05′W
- Country: Canada
- Province: Quebec
- Region: Bas-Saint-Laurent
- RCM: La Mitis
- Established: March 13, 1986

Government
  - Federal riding: Rimouski-Neigette—Mitis—Matapédia—Les Basques
  - Prov. riding: Matane-Matapédia-Mitis

Area
  - Total: 954.82 km^{2} (368.66 sq mi)
  - Land: 923.26 km^{2} (356.47 sq mi)

Population (2021)
  - Total: 47
  - Density: 0.1/km^{2} (0.26/sq mi)
  - Pop 2026-2021: ▲ N/A
  - Dwellings: 202
- Time zone: UTC−5 (EST)
  - Summer (DST): UTC−4 (EDT)
- Highways: No major routes

Lac-des-Eaux-Mortes (French pronunciation: [lak dez‿o mɔʁt], lit. 'Lake of the Dead Waters') is an unorganized territory in the Canadian province of Quebec, located in the La Mitis Regional County Municipality.

== See also ==
- Patapédia River
- East Patapédia River
- La Mitis Regional County Municipality
- List of unorganized territories in Quebec
