= Trois Milles River =

Location
- Country: Canada
- Province: Quebec
- Region: Côte-Nord
- Regional County Municipality: Minganie Regional County Municipality

Physical characteristics
- Source: Lake Princeton
  - location: L'Île-d'Anticosti
  - coordinates: 49.87127°N 64.19350°W
  - elevation: 68 m (223 ft)
- Mouth: Gulf of Saint Lawrence
  - location: L'Île-d'Anticosti
  - coordinates: 49.82278°N 64.33389°W
  - elevation: 1 m (3.3 ft)
- Length: 8.5 km (5.3 mi)

Basin features
- Progression: Lac Saint-Georges, Gamache River, Gamache Bay, Gulf of Saint Lawrence.
- Tributaries
  - left: (upstream)
  - right: (upstream)

The rivière Trois Milles (French pronunciation: [ʁivjɛʁ tʁwa mil], "Three Mile River") is a tributary of Lake Saint-Georges (which is crossed by the Gamache River), flowing in the municipality of L'Île-d'Anticosti, in the Minganie Regional County Municipality, in the administrative region of Côte-Nord, in the province of Quebec, in Canada.

The main forest road on Anticosti Island, which starts from Port-Menier, goes up this valley and crosses the river just south of Princeton Lake.

Airport operations are the main economic activity in this valley.

== Geography ==
The Trois Milles River has its source at Princeton Lake (length: 1.4 km (0.87 mi); altitude: 81 m (266 ft)) located in the western part of Anticosti Island. Princeton Lake is fed by a stream flowing from the north. The mouth of this lake is located at the end of the bay on the south shore, at:

- 6.8 km (4.2 mi) north-east of one of the runways at Port-Menier airport;
- 12.9 km (8.0 mi) north of the town center of the village of Port-Menier;
- 8.3 km (5.2 mi) south-east of the north shore of Anticosti Island.

From its source, the Trois Milles river flows south-west between the Gamache river (located on the west side); and the rivière aux Canards (located on the east side).

From the mouth of Princeton Lake, the course of the Trois Milles River descends 13.9 km (8.6 mi), with a drop of 80 m (260 ft), according to the following segments:

- 3.5 km (2.2 mi) towards the south, up to a bend in the river (coming from the northeast);
- 10.4 km (6.5 mi) towards the south-west in a relatively straight line, passing to the south-east of the Port-Menier airport and passing under the bridge of the road leading to the airport, until 'at its mouth.

This confluence is located at 14.4 km (8.9 mi) east of the Pointe aux Pointe-Ouest point of Anticosti Island, at 11.3 km (7.0 mi) southeast of the shore north of the island and 1.4 km (0.87 mi) north of Gamache Bay. The Trois Milles River empties onto the northeast shore of Lac Saint-Georges, which in turn empties into Gamache Bay which is connected to the Gulf of St. Lawrence.

== Toponymy ==
This toponym is based on the fact that the road leading to the airport crosses this watercourse three miles from the center of the village of Port-Menier.

The toponym "Rivière Trois Milles" was officially recognized on September 12, 1974, in the "Banque des noms de lieux" de la Commission de toponymie du Québec.

== See also ==
- Minganie Regional County Municipality
- L'Île-d'Anticosti, a Municipality
- Anticosti Island, an island
- Gulf of Saint Lawrence
- List of rivers of Quebec
