= South Branch Kedgwick River =

Southern Branch of the Kedgwick River

Location
- Country: Canada

Physical characteristics
- Source
  - location: Saint-Quentin Parish, Restigouche County, New Brunswick
  - coordinates: 47°54′21″N 68°18′10″W
  - elevation: 451 m (1,480 ft)
- Mouth
  - location: Saint-Quentin Parish, Restigouche County, New Brunswick
  - coordinates: 47°54′28″N 67°54′27″W
  - elevation: 210 m (690 ft)
- Length: 37.5 km (23.3 mi)

Basin features
- Tributaries
  - left: (from the confluence) Bains Reef Gulch, Old Shanty Brook, Little Fifteen Mile Brook, Mile Gulch, Meadow Brook.
  - right: (from the confluence) Ferguson Berry Gulch, Hornes Tank Gulch, Fifteen Mile Brook, Portage Brook, Indian Brook, Seve Twenty Mile Brook.

The Southern Branch of the Kedgwick River flows into the Saint-Quentin in Restigouche County at New Brunswick, in Canada.

The "South Branch Kedgwick River" is a tributary of Western bank of the Kedgwick River, which flows Southeast up to the West bank of the Restigouche River; the latest flows North up to the border of Quebec, then East up to the West bank of the Chaleur Bay. The latest opens to the East on the Gulf of Saint Lawrence.

== Geography ==
The "South Branch Kedgwick River" takes its source at the mouth of a small lake (length: 0.2 kilometres (0.12 mi); height: 451 metres (1,480 ft)), located in the Northwest part of the New Brunswick.

The source of the "Southern Branch of the Kedgwick River" is located at:

- 1.2 kilometres (0.75 mi) South of the border between Quebec and New Brunswick;
- 2.5 kilometres (1.6 mi) Northeast of Miller Lake which is the head of water of the Rimouski River;
- 27.9 kilometres (17.3 mi) West of the confluence of the "Southern Branch Kedgwick River";
- 61.9 kilometres (38.5 mi) North of Edmundston downtown.

From its source, the "Kedgwick River" flows on 37.5 kilometres (23.3 mi)

- 4.4 kilometres (2.7 mi) to the East in the Saint-Quentin, in New Brunswick up to a stream (from the West);
- 6.9 kilometres (4.3 mi) to the Southeast, up to the mouth of "Twenty Seven Mile Brook" (from the Southwest);
- 8.0 kilometres (5.0 mi) Eastward up to Meadow Brook (from the North);
- 2.5 kilometres (1.6 mi) to the Southeast, up to Indian Brook (from the Southwest);
- 1.2 kilometres (0.75 mi) to the Southeast, up to Eighteen Mile Gulch (from the North);
- 3.4 kilometres (2.1 mi) eastward up to Portage Brook (from the Southwest);
- 1.9 kilometres (1.2 mi) to the Northeast, in a valley between mountains, forming a wide curve towards the South up to Old Shanty Brook (from the West);
- 3.6 kilometres (2.2 mi) North, up to Bains Reef Gulch (from Northwest);
- 5.6 kilometres (3.5 mi) to the Northeast, to the confluence of the "Southern Branch Kedgwick River".

The "South Branch of the Kedgwick River" empties on the West bank of the Kedgwick River, in forest areas in the locality "Kedgwick Forks".

The confluence of the "Southern Branch Kedgwick River" is located at:

- 42.5 kilometres (26.4 mi) Northwest from the confluence of the Kedgwick River;
- 70.0 kilometres (43.5 mi) Northeast of Edmundston downtown;
- 9.7 kilometres (6.0 mi) South of the border between Quebec and New Brunswick.

== See also ==
Media related to Category: South Branch Kedgwick River at Wikimedia Commons

- Restigouche County
- List of rivers of New Brunswick
- Chaleur Bay
- Gulf of Saint Lawrence
- Restigouche River
- Kedgwick River
- Saint-Quentin
