= Zec de la Rivière-Rimouski =

- Location within Quebec
- Location: Canada, Quebec, Bas-Saint-Laurent
- Coordinates: 48°25′35″N 68°33′15″W
- Area: 18 kilometres (11 mi)
- Established: 1993
- Governing body: Association des pêcheurs sportifs de saumon de la rivière Rimouski

The ZEC of Rimouski River is a zone d'exploitation contrôlée (controlled harvesting zone; ZEC), in the administrative region of Bas-Saint-Laurent, in Quebec, in Canada. This area aims to manage fishing of Atlantic salmon in a 18 kilometres (11 mi) stretch of the Rimouski River. It is administered by the Association des pêcheurs sportifs de saumon de la rivière Rimouski.

== Geography ==
ZEC has a section of 18 kilometres (11 mi) of the Rimouski River. It is located in the territory of the city of Rimouski, the municipalities of Saint-Valérien and Saint-Narcisse-de-Rimouski.

Its territory is adjacent to the Duchénier Wildlife Reserve.
