= Gamache River (Anticosti Island) =

River in Quebec, Canada

Location
- Country: Canada
- Province: Quebec
- Region: Côte-Nord
- Regional County Municipality: Minganie Regional County Municipality

Physical characteristics
- Source: Lake Claude
  - location: L'Île-d'Anticosti
  - coordinates: 49°49′56″N 63°55′37″W
  - elevation: 68 m (223 ft)
- Mouth: Gulf of Saint Lawrence
  - location: L'Île-d'Anticosti
  - coordinates: 49°49′26″N 64°19′44″W
  - elevation: 1 m (3.3 ft)
- Length: 9.4 km (5.8 mi)

Basin features
- Tributaries
  - left: (upstream)
  - right: (upstream)

The Gamache River (French: Rivière Gamache) is a tributary of the Gulf of Saint Lawrence, flowing in the municipality of L'Île-d'Anticosti, Minganie Regional County Municipality, in the administrative region of Côte-Nord, Quebec, Canada.

== Geography ==
The Gamache River draws its source from Lac Claude (length: 2.0 km (1.2 mi); altitude: 68 m (223 ft)) located in the western part of Anticosti Island. Lac Claude is bordered by marshes: north side, southwest side and west side. The mouth of Lac Claude is located at the end of the bay on the west shore, at:

- 3.3 km (2.1 mi) north of one of the runways at Port-Menier airport;
- 7.1 km (4.4 mi) north of the town center of the village of Port-Menier;
- 7.7 km (4.8 mi) south-east of the north shore of Anticosti Island.

From its source, the Gamache River flows south between the Diane Creek (located on the west side); and the Trois Milles River (located on the east side).

From the mouth of Claude Lake, the course of the Gamache River descends on 9.4 km (5.8 mi) towards the south with a drop of 67 m (220 ft), according to the following segments:

- 4.4 km (2.7 mi) first to the northwest, crossing an area of marsh, then south, forming a large curve to the west, crossing another area of marsh, to the road passing north of Port-Menier airport;
- 5.0 km (3.1 mi) towards the southwest almost in a straight line, cross on 1.0 km (0.62 mi) Lake Saint-Georges (altitude: 6.0 m (19.7 ft)) resembling an olive, then descends on 0.64 km (0.40 mi) this last channel, to its mouth. Note: Lake Saint-Georges also receives water from the Trois Milles River.

The Gamache River flows into the heart of the village of Port-Menier, on the north side of the wharf, at the end of Gamache Bay (length: 5.7 km (3.5 mi); width: 4.2 km (2.6 mi) at the entrance to the bay), on the south shore of Anticosti Island, in the Gulf of St. Lawrence. This confluence is located at 13.2 km (8.2 mi) east of the Pointe aux Pointe-Ouest point of Anticosti Island, at 11.5 km (7.1 mi) to the southeast of the shore north of the island. Gamache bay includes Jolliet bay (located in the north-west) and Navots bay (located in the north-east).

== Toponymy ==
The toponym "Baie Gamache" where the village of Port-Menier developed and “Rivière Gamache” are linked.

The toponymic designation "Gamache River" evokes the life work of Louis-Olivier Gamache, who settled on Anticosti Island. He is an almost legendary character who has faced the miseries of the island, despite the elements and men. He is recognized as the Robinson Crusoe of French Canada. Gamache was reputed to be intelligent, skillful, gifted, daring, formidable and feared.

Gamache died in 1854 at Ellis Bay, where he had built a house, precisely on the site where Louis Jolliet had once built a fort. This name appeared in 1925 in the Bulletin de la Société de géographie de Québec.

The toponym "rivière Gamache" was made official on December 5, 1968.

== See also ==
- Minganie Regional County Municipality
- L'Île-d'Anticosti, a municipality
- Anticosti Island, an island
- Gulf of Saint Lawrence
- List of rivers of Quebec
