= Patapedia River =

Patapédia River
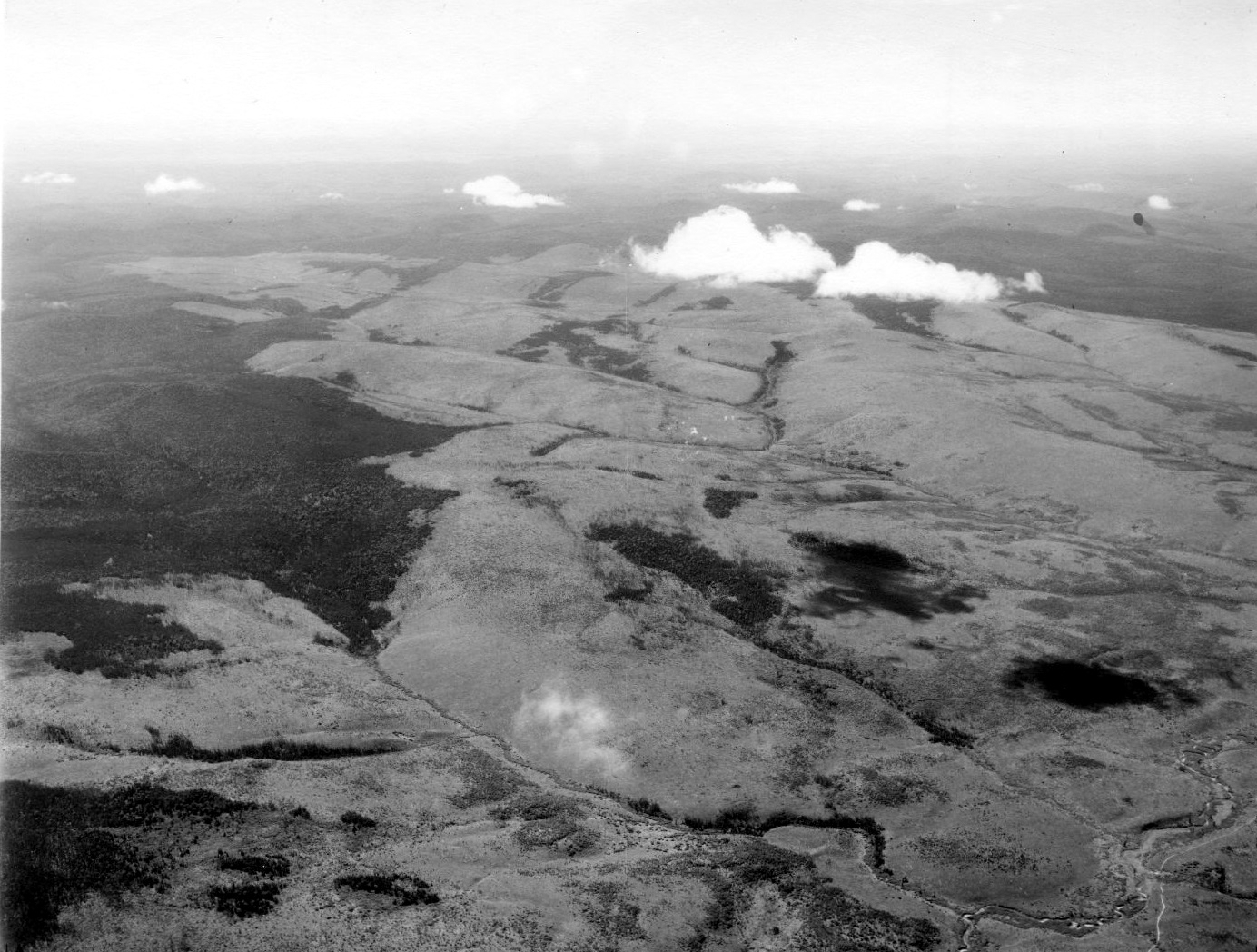

Location
- Country: Canada

Physical characteristics
- Source
  - location: Lac-des-Eaux-Mortes, Quebec, La Mitis Regional County Municipality, Quebec
  - coordinates: 48°15′41″N 67°57′53″W
  - elevation: 401 m (1,316 ft)
- Mouth
  - location: Ruisseau-Ferguson, Quebec (unorganized territory), Avignon Regional County Municipality, Quebec and Restigouche County, New Brunswick
  - coordinates: 47°50′38″N 67°22′28″W
  - elevation: 78 m (256 ft)
- Length: 91.2 km (56.7 mi)

Basin features
- Tributaries
  - left: (from the confluence) Trois-Milles brook, Quatre-Milles brook, Brûlé canyon, Fivemille brook, ruisseau du Sauvage (Sauvage brook), Guérette brook, Cinq-Mars brook, petit ruisseau Indien (Little Indian brook), ruisseau à l'Ours (Bear brook), Meadow River (Patapédia River), East Patapédia River, Muffet brook, Argenté brook.
  - right: (from the confluence) in New Brunswick: Le Gros Ruisseau, Pollard Brook, discharge of Metsébagot Lake; in Quebec: Blacquière canyon, Wiers brook.

The Patapédia River (French: Rivière Patapédia, pronounced [ʁivjɛʁ patapedja]) is a tributary of the Restigouche River in Northwest New Brunswick and Southeast Quebec, in Canada.

The course of river in Quebec (upper segment) has its beginnings the Matapédia Valley in the regional county municipality of La Mitis of the Gaspé Peninsula, in the administrative region of Gaspésie-Îles-de-la-Madeleine, while its end forms the natural provincial border between Quebec and New Brunswick before flowing into the Restigouche River at the "Million Dollar Pool". Also known as the Patapédia Pool, the deep, cold reservoir gets its name from the abundance of salmon that gather there every season.

The upper part of the river is served by forest roads in Zec du Bas-Saint-Laurent. The lower part of Quebec Bank of the river is served by forest roads from the Matapedia Valley such Thomas road, coming from the village of L'Ascension-de-Patapédia, Quebec. The New Brunswick bank of the river has no carrosables access roads because of the rugged mountains along the lower course of the river.

== Geography ==
Patapedia river originates at Lac Long (Long Lake) (length: 2.1 kilometres (1.3 mi); height: 401 metres (1,316 ft)) in the unorganized territory of Lac-des-Eaux-Mortes, Quebec, in Zec du Bas-Saint-Laurent, in Quebec. This lake is located in the northern part of the Zec du Bas-Saint-Laurent or close to the limit of the ZEC and the Southeastern limit of the Massé township. The mouth of the lake is located at:

- 2.9 kilometres (1.8 mi) North of Montagnais Lake;
- 7.5 kilometres (4.7 mi) to the Southwest from the Lac-Mitis village;
- 63.3 kilometres (39.3 mi) Northwest of the confluence of the Patapédia River;
- 43.3 kilometres (26.9 mi) Southeast of the Southeast coast of Gulf of Saint Lawrence.

The Patapédia river flows on 91.2 kilometres (56.7 mi) generally toward the Southeast, entirely in forest land.

Upper course of Patapédia River (segment of 20.3 kilometres (12.6 mi))

From its source at the mouth of Long Lake, the Patapédia river flows:

- 2.9 kilometres (1.8 mi) Eastward up to the discharge (from the South) of Montagnais Lake (length: 1.1 kilometres (0.68 mi); height: 406 metres (1,332 ft)) and Metsébagot (length: 0.8 kilometres (0.50 mi); height: 402 metres (1,319 ft));
- 1.4 kilometres (0.87 mi) Eastward up to Silver Creek (from the North);
- 3.8 kilometres (2.4 mi) to the Southeast, up to the outlet of Maliset Lake (from the West);
- 1.8 kilometres (1.1 mi) to the East up to the West bank of "Hunters Lake" which is located between the "Mountain Height" (which is on the South side) and the "Mountain Lac des Chasseurs" (located on the North side);
- 3.9 kilometres (2.4 mi) to the Southeast, crossing the "Hunters Lake" (altitude: 365 metres (1,198 ft)) over its full length up to its mouth;
- 5.0 kilometres (3.1 mi) to the Southeast up to the West shore of Patapédia Lake which is located at the foot of the "Moose Mountain";
- 1.5 kilometres (0.93 mi) to the Southeast, crossing the Patapédia Lake (altitude: 341 metres (1,119 ft)) over its full length up to its mouth.

Intermediate course upstream of Patapédia Lake (segment of 25.2 kilometres (15.7 mi))

From the mouth of the Patapédia Lake, the Patapédia river flows:

- 2.1 kilometres (1.3 mi) to the Southeast, crossing a small lake on 0.7 kilometres (0.43 mi) which proves to be an extension of Patapédia Lake, up to a stream (from the East);
- 2.5 kilometres (1.6 mi) to the Southwest, up to the confluence of "Le Gros Ruisseau" (from the West);
- 9.3 kilometres (5.8 mi) to the Southeast, then East, up to a stream (from the North);
- 1.1 kilometres (0.68 mi) Eastward up to a creek (from the South);
- 5.5 kilometres (3.4 mi) Eastward, forming a detour to the North to a stream (from the South);
- 2.6 kilometres (1.6 mi) to the Northeast, up to a stream (from the Southeast);
- 2.1 kilometres (1.3 mi) to the Northeast, up to the confluence of the East Patapédia River (from the North-West).

Intermediate course upstream of the East Patapédia River (segment of 11.6 kilometres (7.2 mi))

From the confluence of the East Patapédia River, the Patapédia river flows:

- 1.0 kilometre (0.62 mi) to the Southeast, up to a stream (from the North);
- 4.9 kilometres (3.0 mi) to the Southeast, up to a stream (from the North);
- 0.2 kilometres (0.12 mi) to the southeast, up to the confluence of the Meadow River (Patapédia River) (from the Northeast);
- 2.0 kilometres (1.2 mi) to the Southeast, up to a stream (from the East);
- 1.1 kilometres (0.68 mi) to the South, up to a creek (from the Southwest);
- 4.4 kilometres (2.7 mi) to the South, up to the Southeast limit of the unorganized territory of Lac-des-Eaux-Mortes, Quebec, is at the Northern limit of the New Brunswick.

Lower course of the river Patapédia (segment of 34.1 kilometres (21.2 mi))

From the Southeast limit of the unorganized territory of Lac-des-Eaux-Mortes, Quebec, the Patapédia river delimits the Quebec (Roncesvalles Township) and the New Brunswick (Restigouche County), to the confluence of the river, as follows:

- 0.3 kilometres (0.19 mi) to the Southeast, up to a stream (from the East);
- 1.5 kilometres (0.93 mi) to the Southwest up to a stream (from the West);
- 0.7 kilometres (0.43 mi) to the South, up to a creek (from the West);
- 2.3 kilometres (1.4 mi) to the South, then East, up to a creek (from the Southwest);
- 2.6 kilometres (1.6 mi) to the South, up to confluence of Pollard Brook (from the southwest);
- 5.7 kilometres (3.5 mi) to the Southeast, forming six river bends, up to a stream (from the North);
- 2.7 kilometres (1.7 mi) Eastward up to Cinq-Mars stream (from the North);
- 2.0 kilometres (1.2 mi) Eastward up to Guérette stream (from the North);
- 4.8 kilometres (3.0 mi) Eastward up to Wild Creek (from the West);
- 3.8 kilometres (2.4 mi) Eastward up to Fivemile Creek (from the West). Note: The confluence of the creek "Five Mile Gulch" (from the West) or the New Brunswick is located at 0.2 kilometres (0.12 mi) upstream of the confluence of Fivemile Creek;
- 1.6 kilometres (0.99 mi) Eastward up to a creek (from the North);
- 2.0 kilometres (1.2 mi) to the East, then South, up to a stream (from the Southwest);
- 4.1 kilometres (2.5 mi) to the Southeast, winding up to the confluence of the river

After rounding an island at the confluence, the Patapédia River empties into a river bend on the West bank of the Restigouche River, on the edge of the unorganized territory of Ruisseau-Ferguson, Quebec, of the regional county municipality (MRC) of Avignon Regional County Municipality. This confluence forms the boundary of Quebec and New Brunswick and is located at:

- 1.5 kilometres (0.93 mi) upstream of the confluence of Whites Brook (New Brunswick) (coming from the Est);
- 53.4 kilometres (33.2 mi) Southwest of the bridge crossing the Restigouche River to link the city of Campbellton, New Brunswick (in New Brunswick) and the village of Pointe-à-la-Croix, Quebec;
- 34.8 kilometres (21.6 mi) Southwest of the confluence of the Matapedia River;
- 23.8 kilometres (14.8 mi) Northwest of Kedgwick downtown, in New Brunswick.

== Toponymy ==
The toponym "Patapédia River" was officialized on December 5, 1968, at Commission de toponymie du Québec (Quebec Place Names Board).

== Fishes and wildlife ==
Patapédia river is known for its Atlantic salmon fishing. The CGRMP (Corporation de Gestion des Rivières Matapédia et Patapédia - Management Corporation of Rivers Matapedia and Patapédia) administers sport fishing area of the river; it is a non-profit organization constituted as of March 5, 1991 under the 3rd part of "Loi des compagnies du Québec". This creation resulted of the grouping of 23 municipalities spread over two Regional County Municipality (RCM): La Matapedia Regional County Municipality and Avignon Regional County Municipality.

The upstream migration of salmon in the Patapédia River is usually done in early June, while between 600 and 1,000 specimens date back its course. The recreational salmon fishery usually opens in early June for a period of three months. The heyday of the fishing season is between the last week of June and the second week of August. The CGRMP offers accommodation in all sectors.

Patapédi river is divided in three sectors for fishing quotas. Fishing rights are drawn. The first sector includes 16 tanks (including Big Indian, Ravin Brûlé and Twin Upper); the second includes 38 tanks (including Berge red Fosse Swimming and Hewitt); the third sector includes 20 tanks (including Field of Blueuts, Fosse Albini and Salmon Hole).

== See also ==
- La Mitis, a regional county municipality (MRC)
- Avignon Regional County Municipality, (MRC)
- Lac-des-Eaux-Mortes, Quebec, an unorganized territory
- Ruisseau-Ferguson, Quebec, an unorganized territory
- Restigouche County, in New Brunswick
- Restigouche River
- Meadow River
- East Patapédia River
- Patapédia Lake
- Zec du Bas-Saint-Laurent, a controlled harvesting zone (zec)
- List of rivers of New Brunswick
- List of rivers of Quebec
