= Ruisseau-Ferguson =

- Unorganized territory
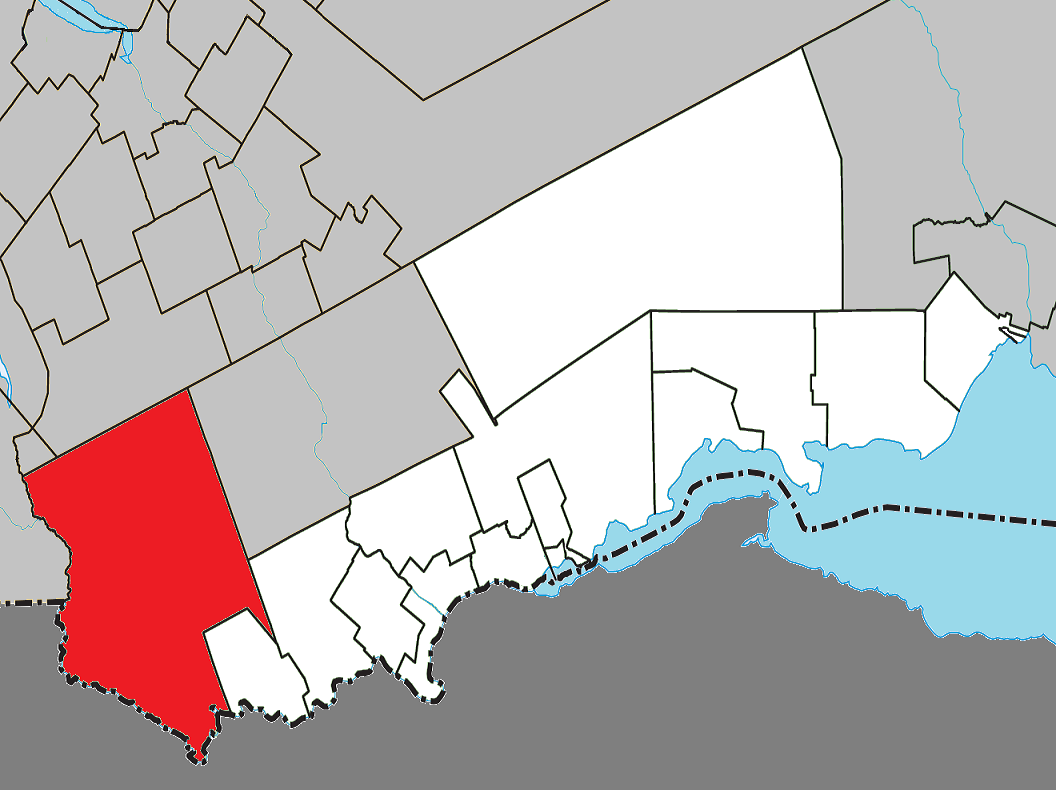
- Location within Avignon RCM

- Location in eastern Quebec
- Coordinates: 48°05′N 67°30′W
- Country: Canada
- Province: Quebec
- Region: Gaspésie– Îles-de-la-Madeleine
- RCM: Avignon
- Constituted: unspecified

Government
  - Federal riding: Gaspésie—Les Îles-de-la-Madeleine—Listuguj
  - Prov. riding: Bonaventure

Area
  - Total: 678.36 km^{2} (261.92 sq mi)
  - Land: 675.94 km^{2} (260.98 sq mi)

Population (2021)
  - Total: 0
  - Density: 0/km^{2} (0/sq mi)
  - Pop (2016-21): 0.0%
  - Dwellings: 0
- Time zone: UTC−05:00 (EST)
  - Summer (DST): UTC−04:00 (EDT)
- Highways: No major routes

Ruisseau-Ferguson is an unorganized territory in the Gaspésie–Îles-de-la-Madeleine region of Quebec, Canada.

It is named after the Ferguson Creek that is a left tributary of the Restigouche River. The territory's western boundary is the Patapédia River.

== Demographics ==
Historical Census Data - Ruisseau-Ferguson, Quebec

Year	Pop.	±%
1991	3	—
1996	0	−100.0%
2001	0	0.00%
2006	0	0.00%

Year	Pop.	±%
2011	0	0.00%
2016	0	0.00%
2021	0	0.00%

Source: Statistics Canada

== See also ==
- List of unorganized territories in Quebec
