= Zec du Bas-Saint-Laurent =

- Location within Quebec
- Location: La Mitis Regional County Municipality
- Coordinates: 48°14′30″N 68°04′20″W
- Established: 1978
- Governing body: Société de Gestion des Ressources du Bas Saint-Laurent

The ZEC du Bas-Saint-Laurent (Zec of Lower St. Lawrence) is a "zone d'exploitation contrôlée" (controlled harvesting zone), in the La Mitis Regional County Municipality, in the administrative region of Bas-Saint-Laurent, in Quebec, in Canada.

This territory of hunting and fishing is managed by the "Société de gestion des ressources du Bas-Saint-Laurent". This Association was registered at "Registraire des entreprises du Québec" on January 24, 1995" as a non-profit corporation. The administrative office of the ZEC is located in Rimouski.

== History ==
Usually, at the end of 19th century in Canada, the arrival of the train and the construction of forest roads in the hinterland allowed better access to wilderness. In the 20th century, airplanes, snowmobiles and other all-terrain vehicles were other ways to remote and difficult to reach water bodies. Consequently, forestry and mining, hunting, fishing, and other recreational and tourism activities (excursions, boating, vacationing...) were able to grow in these wilds.

In 1978, the Quebec government has chosen not to renew the leases of private clubs hunting and fishing on public lands. "Zec du Bas-Saint-Laurent" was established in 1978 by the Government of Quebec to democratize access to this territory and to help the development of outdoor recreation. This newly created zone was assigned to volunteer directors elected by the members of Zec, who will see their administration and control the exploitation of fish and wildlife.

== Geography ==
The territory of the ZEC covers an area of 1,017 square kilometres (393 sq mi) in the administrative region of Bas-Saint-Laurent. It is located along the Réserve faunique de Rimouski (Rimouski Wildlife Reserve). This territory in the form of "L" is located between the villages of La Trinité-des-Monts (west), Saint-Marcellin (northwest) and Saint-Charles-Garnier (north). ZEC is at the west of waterbodies: Lac Inférieur (Lower Lake), Lac à la Croix (Lake of the Cross) and Lac Supérieur (Lake Superior).

Major lakes of Zec are: Chic-Chocs, hunters, Des Eaux-Mortes, Du Beaver Deposit Du, Du Gros Ruisseau Du Summit, Grand Lake Neigette, Grand Bouchard, Huron, Long, Glasses, Mistigougèche, Montagnais, Patapédia, Little Lake and Lake Neigette Prime.

How to get the entries of the Zec:

Entry no. 1 - Caribou: From Rimouski, take route 232 south to the junction of the route 234. Then follow the road for about 3 km from the reserve to the post Home Caribou.

Entry no. 2 - 30 Miles: From Lake Humqui, follow the signs to get to 30 Miles entry on non-paved roads.

== Hydrography ==
The territory of the ZEC has 110 lakes for fishing the brook trout and two lakes for fishing "lake trout".

== Wildlife ==
The hunting for the moose, deer, black bear and small animal is authorized in the ZEC. Hunting quotas are allocated by the ZEC based on species, sex beasts (originals and deer), hunting gear and periods of the year.

Recreational fishing is popular on the territory of the ZEC. Quotas of fishing are assigned by the ZEC for brook trout and lake trout.

== Tourism ==
Three hiking trails of 5 kilometres (3.1 mi) are built along rivers in the ZEC. Primitive camping is allowed along the same rivers.

The territory of the ZEC has 25 campgrounds (with various facilities) with a total of 300 campsites, including: camping Esker, Island Beauséjour, Chic-shock, River Mistigoucèche, Montagnais, Neigette, Huron, Bona, Mistigougèche, Mailloux, Lambert, Trinity, P52, Zephyr, Brook Ouellet, Rimouski-Est, Taché, 30 miles, Camp Brûlé, Club Price, Eaux-Mortes, Du Huit and Chasseurs.

== Attachments ==
=== Related articles ===
- La Mitis Regional County Municipality
- Bas-Saint-Laurent, administrative region in Quebec
- Zone d'exploitation contrôlée (Controlled Harvesting Zone) (ZEC)
- Patapédia River

=== External links ===
- Official web site of the ZEC

=== Online sources ===
- Commission de toponymie du Québec (Geographical Names Board of Québec) - Toponym: Zec du Bas Saint-Laurent
- Zone d'exploitation contrôlée (Controlled Harvesting Zones) (ZEC) - Ministry of Natural Resources of Quebec
