= La Trinité-des-Monts =

- Parish municipality
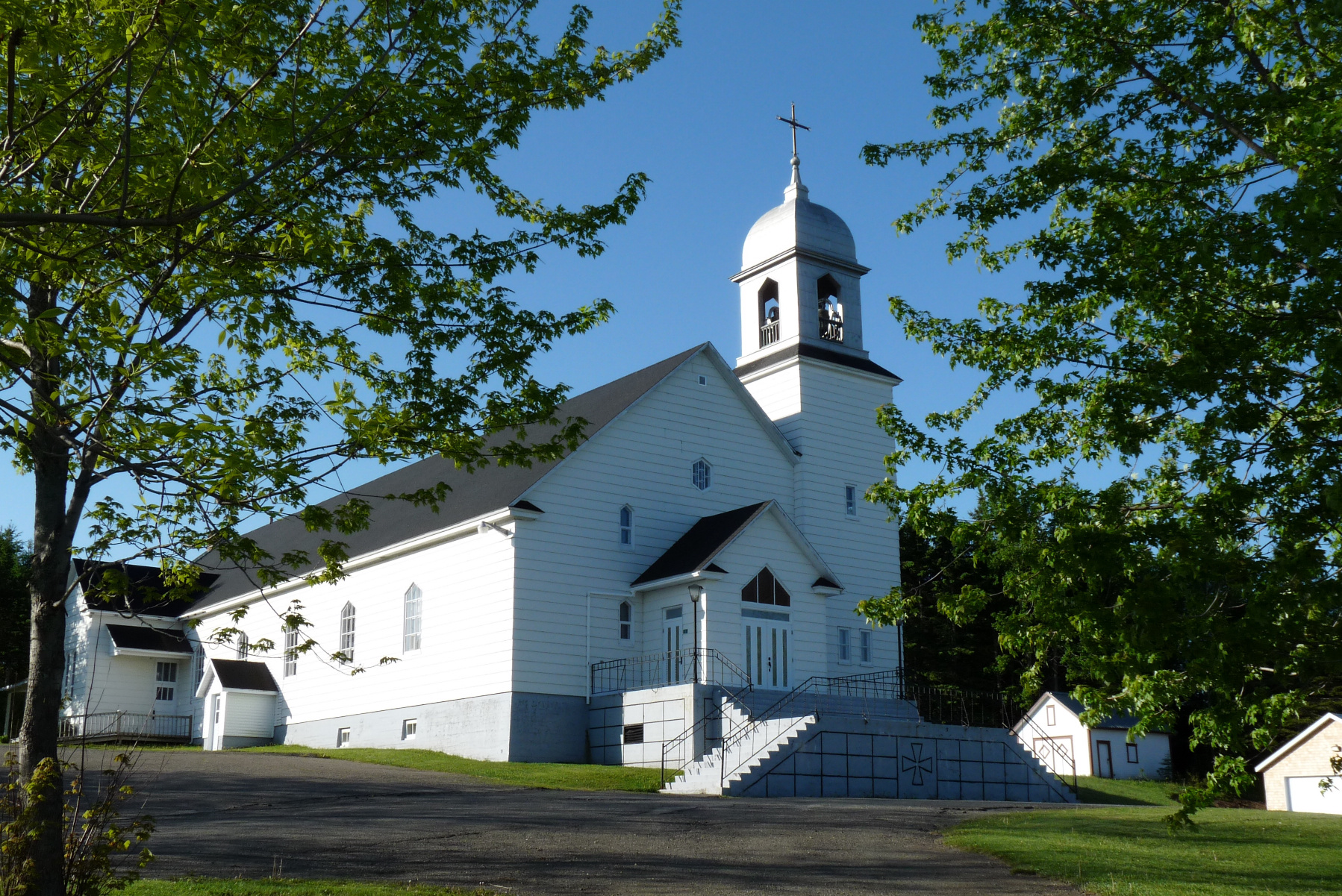

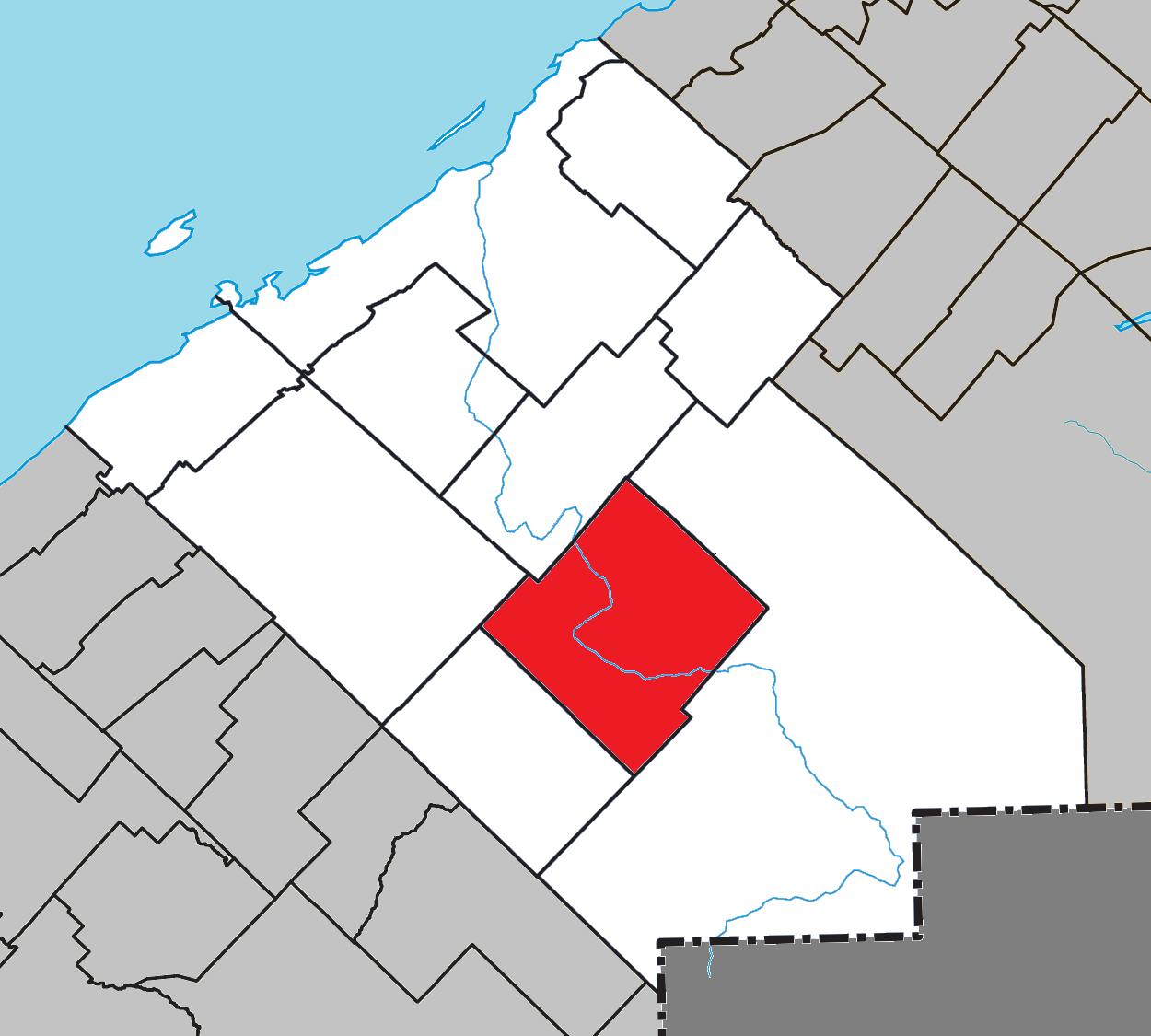
- Location within Rimouski-Neigette RCM

- Location in eastern Quebec
- Coordinates: 48.13°N 68.47°W
- Country: Canada
- Province: Quebec
- Region: Bas-Saint-Laurent
- RCM: Rimouski-Neigette
- Constituted: January 1, 1965
- Named for: The Christian Trinity and the nearby mountains

Government
  - Mayor: Chantal Gagnon
  - Federal riding: Rimouski-Neigette—Mitis—Matapédia—Les Basques
  - Prov. riding: Rimouski

Area
  - Total: 239.20 km^{2} (92.36 sq mi)
  - Land: 233.07 km^{2} (89.99 sq mi)

Population (2021)
  - Total: 233
  - Density: 1/km^{2} (2.6/sq mi)
  - Pop 2016-2021: ▲4.5%
  - Dwellings: 167
- Time zone: UTC−5 (EST)
  - Summer (DST): UTC−4 (EDT)
- Postal code(s): G0K 1B0
- Area codes: 418 and 581
- Highways: R-232
- Website: www.trinite-des-monts.ca

La Trinité-des-Monts (French pronunciation: [la tʁinite de mɔ̃]) is a parish municipality in the Canadian province of Quebec, located in the Rimouski-Neigette Regional County Municipality.

The municipality's religious name refers to the trinity in Christianity. The name was inspired by the Mission of the Holy Spirit, which gave rise to the parish of La Trinité-des-Monts and the neighbouring parish of Esprit-Saint. In fact, the post office where La Trinité-des-Monts was later organised took the name Esprit-Saint in 1938. The post office was renamed Cenellier in 1939, after a local river. It adopted its current name of La Trinité-des-Monts in 1943. These place names were chosen by the religious authorities of the Archdiocese of Rimouski. More specifically, it was Monsignor Charles-Eugène Parent, Bishop of Rimouski, who baptised the parish when he spotted the Notre Dame Mountains to the east while looking for a site to build the church of La Trinité-des-Monts.

== Geography ==
La Roche is a township established on May 5, 1882. It has an overall area of 20,235 hectares and is named for Troilus de Mesqouez.

== Demographics ==
In the 2021 Census of Population conducted by Statistics Canada, La Trinité-des-Monts had a population of 233 living in 128 of its 167 total private dwellings, a change of 4.5% from its 2016 population of 223. With a land area of 233.07 km^{2} (89.99 sq mi), it had a population density of 1.0/km^{2} (2.6/sq mi) in 2021.

== See also ==
- Rimouski River
- List of parish municipalities in Quebec
