= Saint-Valérien, Quebec =

Saint-Valérien
- Parish municipality
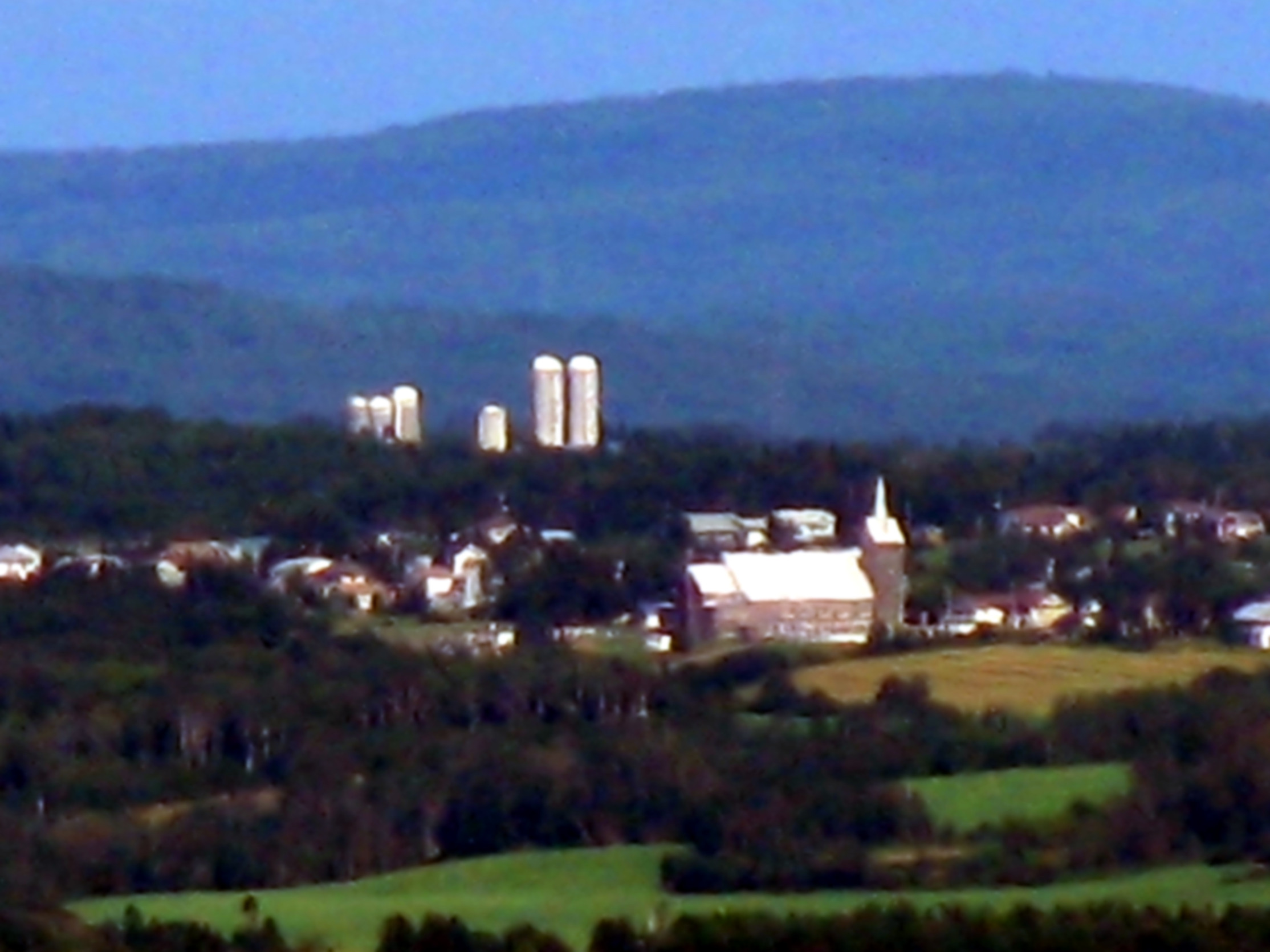
- Saint-Valérien in 2008

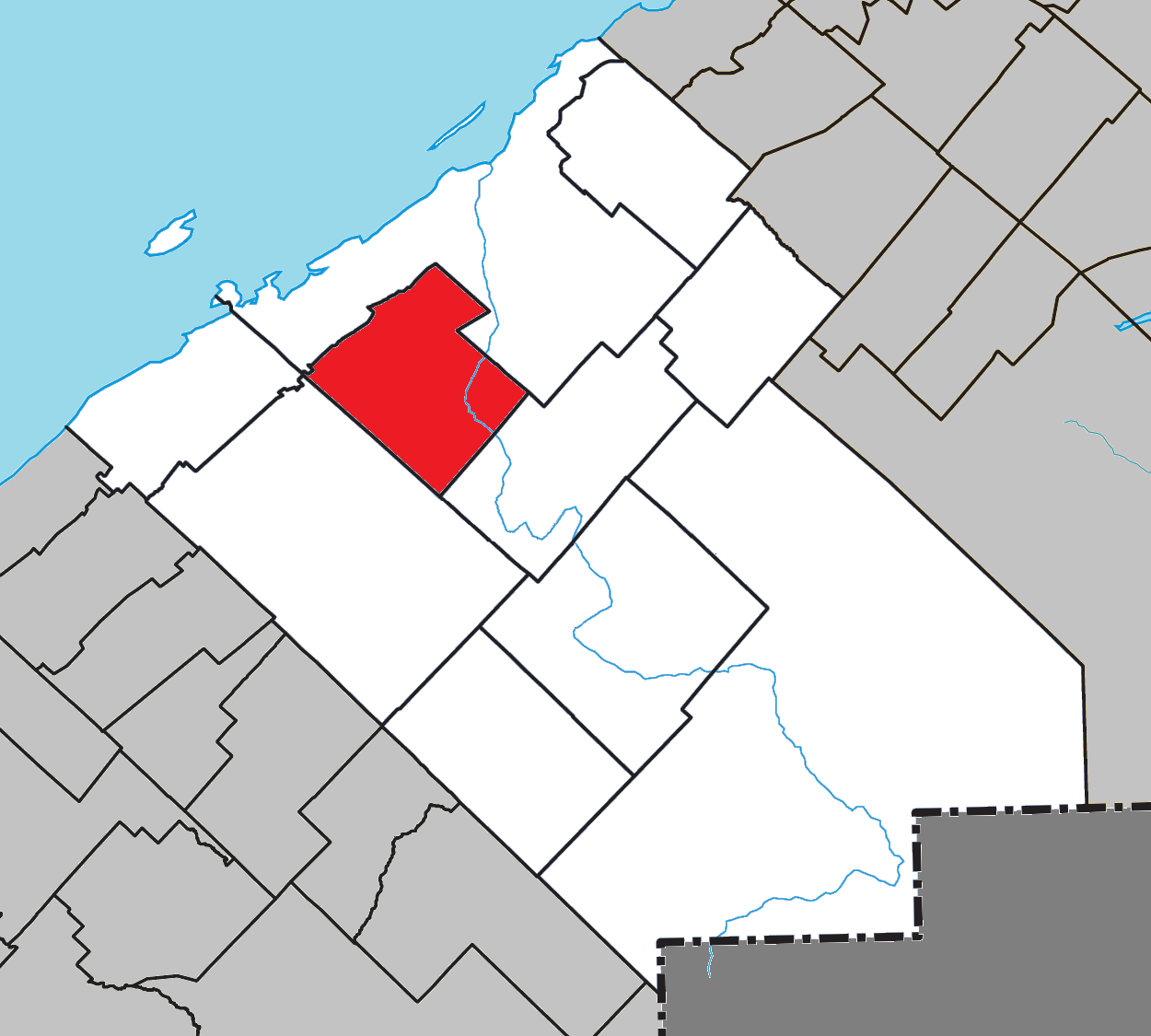
- Location within Rimouski-Neigette RCM

- Location in eastern Quebec
- Coordinates: 48.3333°N 68.6667°W
- Country: Canada
- Province: Quebec
- Region: Bas-Saint-Laurent
- RCM: Rimouski-Neigette
- Constituted: June 19, 1885

Government
  - Mayor: Christian Beaulieu
  - Federal riding: Rimouski-Neigette—Mitis—Matapédia—Les Basques
  - Prov. riding: Rimouski

Area
  - Total: 146.70 km^{2} (56.64 sq mi)
  - Land: 145.02 km^{2} (55.99 sq mi)

Population (2021)
  - Total: 906
  - Density: 6.2/km^{2} (16/sq mi)
  - Pop 2016-2021: ▲8.5%
  - Dwellings: 459
- Time zone: UTC−5 (EST)
  - Summer (DST): UTC−4 (EDT)
- Postal code(s): G0L 4E0
- Area codes: 418 and 581
- Highways: No major routes
- Website: www.municipalite.saint-valerien.qc.ca

Saint-Valérien (French pronunciation: [sɛ̃ valeʁjɛ̃]) is a parish municipality in the Canadian province of Quebec, located in the Rimouski-Neigette Regional County Municipality.

== Demographics ==
In the 2021 Census of Population conducted by Statistics Canada, Saint-Valérien had a population of 906 living in 378 of its 459 total private dwellings, a change of 8.5% from its 2016 population of 835. With a land area of 145.02 km^{2} (55.99 sq mi), it had a population density of 6.2/km^{2} (16.2/sq mi) in 2021.

== See also ==
- Rimouski River
- List of parish municipalities in Quebec
