= Lac-Huron, Quebec =

Lac-Huron
- Unorganized Territory
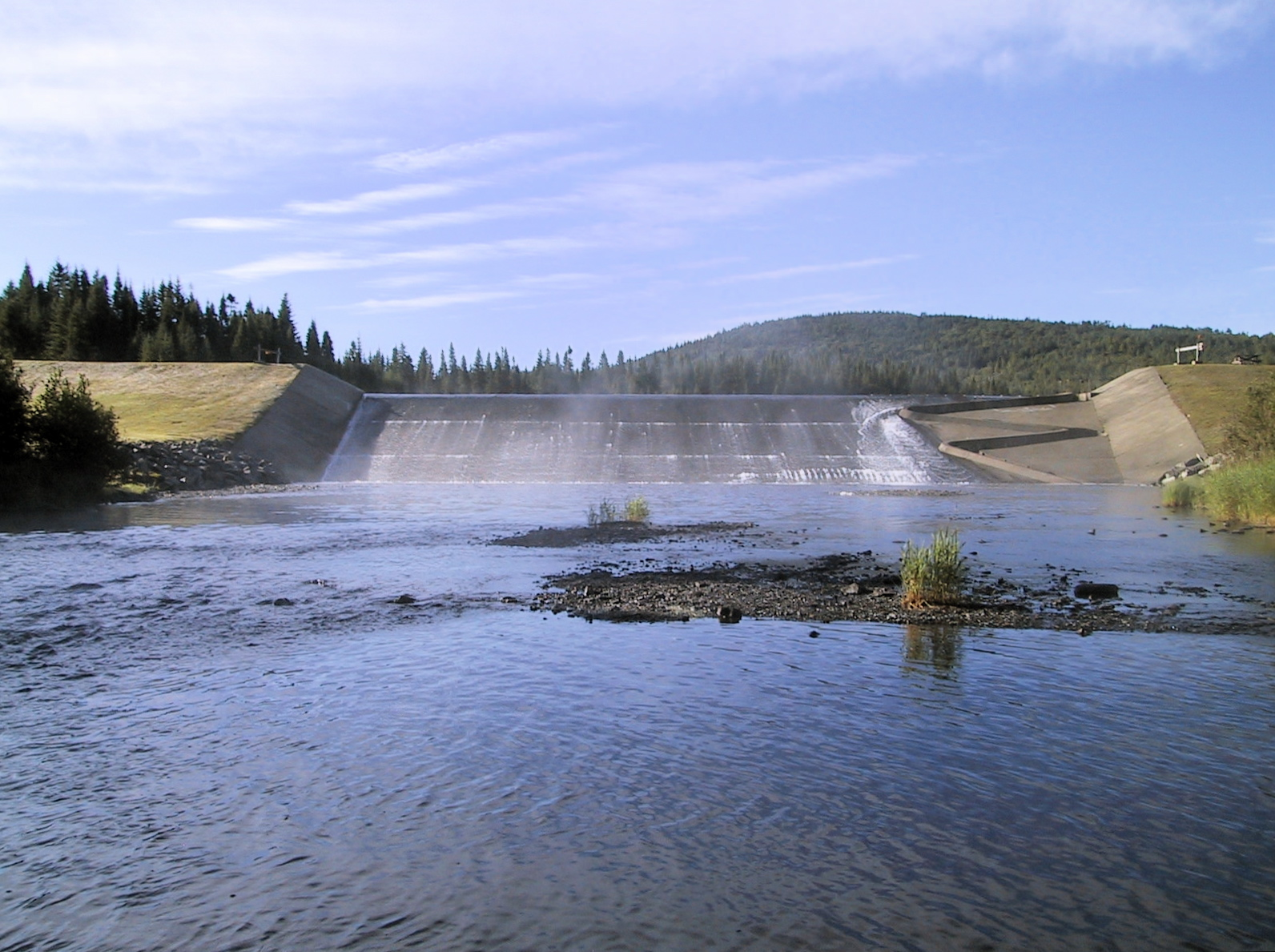
- Fish ladder at the outlet of Lake Rimouski

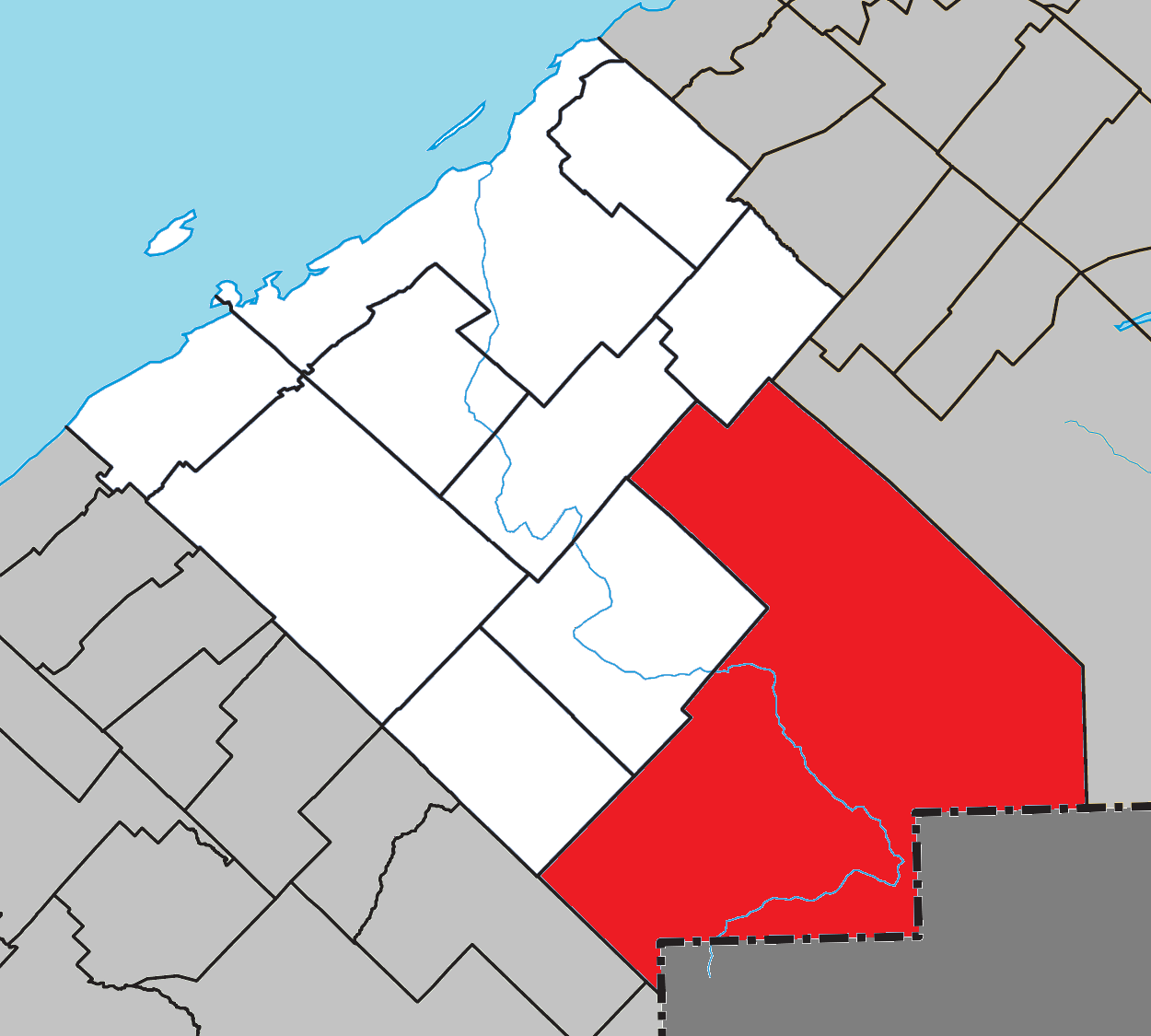
- Location within Rimouski-Neigette RCM

- Location in eastern Quebec
- Coordinates: 48.2°N 68.23°W
- Country: Canada
- Province: Quebec
- Region: Bas-Saint-Laurent
- RCM: Rimouski-Neigette
- Established: January 1, 1986

Government
  - Federal riding: Rimouski-Neigette—Mitis—Matapédia—Les Basques
  - Prov. riding: Rimouski

Area
  - Total: 965.30 km^{2} (372.70 sq mi)
  - Land: 960.57 km^{2} (370.88 sq mi)

Population (2021)
  - Total: 30
  - Density: 0/km^{2} (0/sq mi)
  - Pop 2016-2021: ▲200%
  - Dwellings: 125
- Time zone: UTC−5 (EST)
  - Summer (DST): UTC−4 (EDT)
- Area codes: 418 and 581
- Highways: No major routes

Lac-Huron (French pronunciation: [lak yʁɔ̃]) is an unorganized territory in the Canadian province of Quebec, located in the Rimouski-Neigette Regional County Municipality.

== See also ==
- Rimouski River
- List of unorganized territories in Quebec
