= Rimouski River =

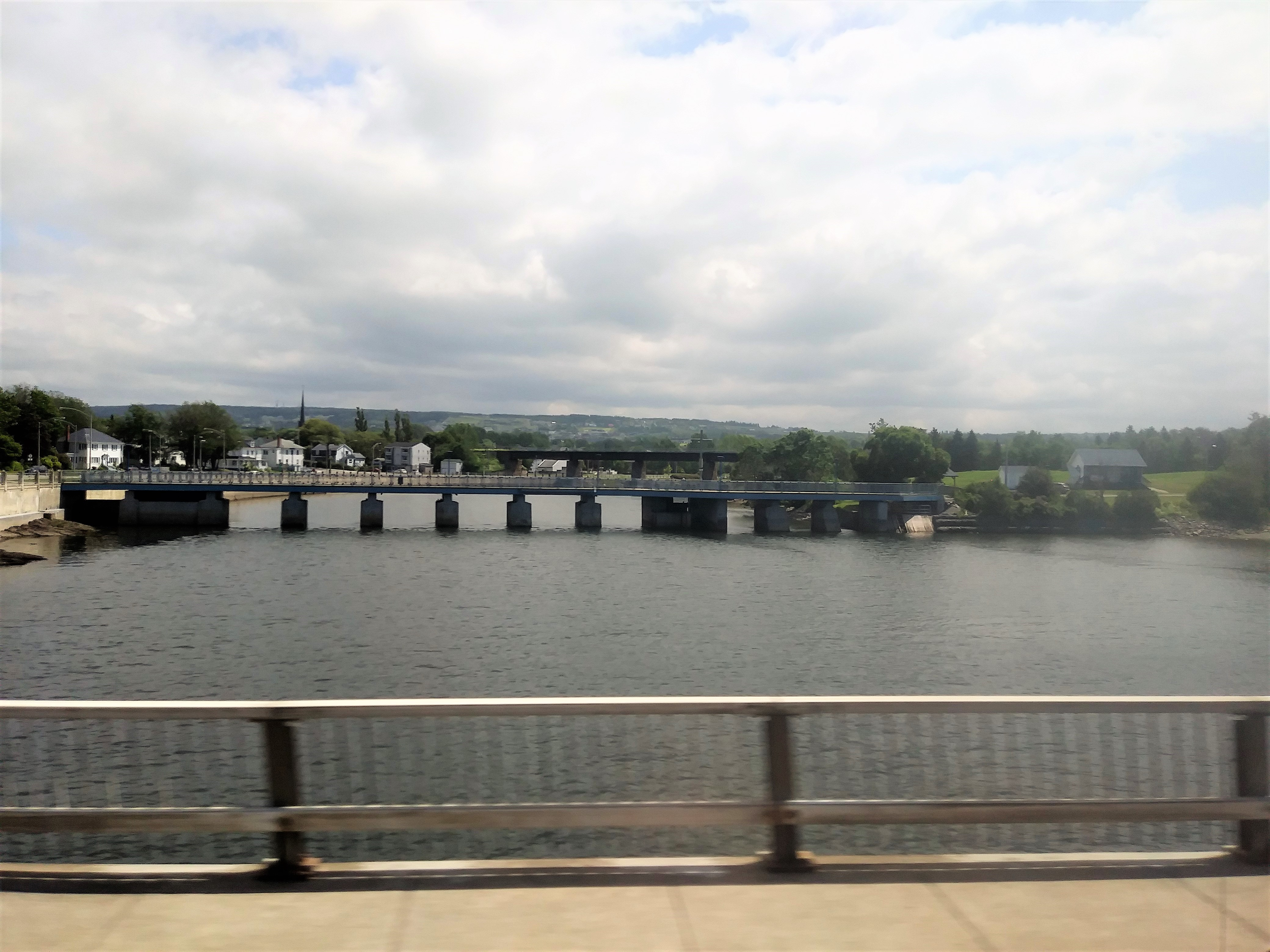

Location
- Country: Canada

Physical characteristics
- Source
  - location: Saint-Quentin Parish, Restigouche County, New Brunswick
  - coordinates: 47°53′37″N 68°20′08″W
  - elevation: 460 m (1,510 ft)
- Mouth
  - location: Rimouski, Rimouski-Neigette RCM, Quebec
  - coordinates: 48°28′14″N 68°31′17″W
  - elevation: 0 m (0 ft)
- Length: 119.2 km (74.1 mi)
- Basin size: 1,635 km^{2} (631 sq mi)

Basin features
- Tributaries
  - left: (from the confluence) Cavée stream, Chassé stream, Rigoumabe River, Little Rimouski River, Black River (Rimouski River), White river (Rimouski River), Little Touradi River, France River, Boucher River (Rimouski River), Grand Touradi River, the Grand Matinal creek, Levasseur stream, Jansen creek, Abraham casting, Nathaël casting, Beaver Creek, Deer Lake Outlet, White Creek, Morin Creek.
  - right: (from the confluence) Branch Lévesque, Levasseur creek, Gagnon stream, Brule River, Bois Brule River, Hot Creek Lake, Macpès River, Creek of Petit Lac Macpès, Cat River, Indian Creek, Ferrée River (Ferré Lake), casting of Poirier Rapid, Brisson River (Grand Touradi River), East Rimouski River, Flat Creek Tamahagan stream.

Rimouski River is a river emptying at Rimouski, on the South shore of St. Lawrence River, in the Rimouski-Neigette Regional County Municipality, in the administrative region of Bas-Saint-Laurent, Quebec, Canada.

From the border between New Brunswick and Quebec, the Rimouski River crosses over the unorganized territory of Lac-Huron, Quebec, as well as the municipalities of La Trinité-des-Monts, Saint-Narcisse-de-Rimouski, Saint-Valérien, Sainte-Odile-sur-Rimouski and the city of Rimouski.

== Geography ==
=== Course ===
The Rimouski River has its source at an altitude of 460 metres (1,510 ft) from the Miller Lake (length: 0.7 kilometres (0.43 mi)) located in Saint-Quentin Parish, Restigouche County, New Brunswick, in the Notre Dame Mountains. The mouth of the Miller Lake is located 64.4 kilometres (40.0 mi) Southeast of coastal Southeastern of St. Lawrence River and 3.3 kilometres (2.1 mi) East of the border of Quebec.

The Rimouski River flows over 119.2 kilometres (74.1 mi).

Upper Rimouski river courses (segment of 35.5 kilometres (22.1 mi))

From Miller Lake, the Rimouski river flows over:

- 2.8 kilometres (1.7 mi) to the North, in the province of New Brunswick;
- 1.9 kilometres (1.2 mi) to the Northeast in the province of Quebec up to the discharge (from the west) of the Daniel Lake and Claude Lake;
- 11.1 kilometres (6.9 mi) Eastward, collecting the water discharge of Lake Santerre, up to the confluence of the creek Tamahagan (from the South);
- 1.5 kilometres (0.93 mi) to the Northeast, collecting the waters of Morin Creek (from the West);
- 3.7 kilometres (2.3 mi) to the Southeast, up to the confluence of the Flat Creek (from the South);
- 9.8 kilometres (6.1 mi) to the Northwest, up to a road bridge;
- 2.1 kilometres (1.3 mi) Westward, up to the Southeast shore of Rimouski Lake;
- 2.6 kilometres (1.6 mi) to the Northwest, crossing the Rimouski Lake (altitude: 320 metres (1,050 ft)) over its full length up to "Rimouski Lake dam," located at Northwest of the lake.

Intermediate course of the Rimouski River (segment of 40.7 kilometres (25.3 mi))

From Rimouski Lake, Rimouski River flows mainly in the Rimouski Wildlife Reserve on:

- 0.8 kilometres (0.50 mi) to the Northwest, collecting the waters of a stream (from the Northeast) up to the bridge of the "forest road no. 1";
- 3.4 kilometres (2.1 mi) to the Northwest, collecting the waters of the White creek (from the Southwest), up to the outlet of Lake Deer (from the Southwest);
- 2.6 kilometres (1.6 mi) to the Northwest by cutting a forest road up to the outlet of Beaver Lake (from the West);
- 4.1 kilometres (2.5 mi) Northward, up to the confluence of the East Rimouski River;
- 4.4 kilometres (2.7 mi) Westward up to the boundary of the municipality of La Trinité-des-Monts;
- 6.3 kilometres (3.9 mi) Westward, collecting the waters of the "Abraham casting" and past the "Roches Labbé", up to the confluence of the creek Jansen (from Northeast);
- 1.6 kilometres (0.99 mi) to the Northwest, up to the dam of "Three Little Saults";
- 3.9 kilometres (2.4 mi) to the Northwest across the segment beginning in river saults and passing 1.6 kilometres (0.99 mi) of the village east side of La Trinité-des-Monts;
- 6.6 kilometres (4.1 mi) to the Northeast, collecting the waters of the Brisson River (Grand Touradi River) (from the East) up to "Red Bridge";
- 3.9 kilometres (2.4 mi) to the Northwest, crossing the "rapides à Poirier" (Poirier's rapids) and collecting the waters of the "coulée du Rapide à Poirier" (casting of Poirier's rapids)", to the boundary of the municipality of Saint-Narcisse-de-Rimouski;
- 3.1 kilometres (1.9 mi) Northward, crossing a marsh area in the end of the segment, up to the confluence of the Ferrée River (Ferré Lake) (from the Northeast).

Lower course of Rimouski river (downstream of the Ferrée River confluence) (segment of 17.2 kilometres (10.7 mi))

From the confluence of the Ferrée River (Ferré Lake), the Rimouski river flows over:

- 0.4 kilometres (0.25 mi) Westward up to Fond-d'Ormes Bridge of Taché Road;
- 2.4 kilometres (1.5 mi) to the Southwest, up to the confluence of the Grand Touradi River;
- 0.5 kilometres (0.31 mi) to the Southwest, up to the limit of the Duchenier Wildlife Reserve;
- 2.4 kilometres (1.5 mi) to the Northwest, crossing several waterfalls and rapids, up to the confluence of the "Indian Creek" (from the Northeast);
- 3.3 kilometres (2.1 mi) to the Southwest, up to the municipal boundary;
- 0.7 kilometres (0.43 mi) to the Northwest, forming a curve towards the Southwest, to reach the limit of Saint-Narcisse-de-Rimouski;
- 4.2 kilometres (2.6 mi) to the Northwest, crossing the "Hubb Falls" and going out of the Duchénier Wildlife Sanctuary, up to the confluence of the France River (from the West);
- 3.3 kilometres (2.1 mi) to the Northeast, to the limit of the Rimouski Wildlife Reserve;

Lower course of Rimouski river (downstream of the Rimouski Wildlife Reserve) (segment of 25.8 kilometres (16.0 mi))

- 0.2 kilometres (0.12 mi) Northward, up to the confluence of the Cat River (from the East);
- 2.3 kilometres (1.4 mi) to the Northwest, collecting the waters of the creek "Petit Lac Macpès" (from the Northeast) and through the "Canyon of Hell’s Gates", up to the boundary of the municipality of Saint-Valérien;
- 3.7 kilometres (2.3 mi) to the Northwest by collecting the waters of the Little Touradi River (from the Southwest) and the White River (Rimouski River) (coming from Southwest) up to the confluence of the Black river (Rimouski River);
- 3.9 kilometres (2.4 mi) to the Northeast, up to the limit of sector Sainte-Odile-sur-Rimouski of the city of Rimouski;
- 2.9 kilometres (1.8 mi) to the Northeast, up to the confluence of the Little Rimouski River;
- 0.6 kilometres (0.37 mi) Northward, up to the confluence of the Bois Brule River;
- 2.0 kilometres (1.2 mi) Northward, collecting the waters of the Rigoumabe River (from the Southwest), up to the confluence of the Brule River;
- 6.3 kilometres (3.9 mi) Northward, up to Highway 20;
- 3.9 kilometres (2.4 mi) to the Northeast, crossing the city of Rimouski and passing under the railway bridge of Canadian National Railway and the bridge of route 132 at the end of the segment, up to its confluence.

The Rimouski River pours over the long strike of the Southeast coast of St. Lawrence River up to 3.0 kilometres (1.9 mi) at low tide. This confluence is located in the harbor of Rimouski, facing the Saint-Barnabé Island. The entrance to this road is open on 1.8 kilometres (1.1 mi) between the Northeast tip of the Saint-Barnabé Island and the platform of Rimouski city. This harbor is situated at the opposite of the city of Rimouski extends to the Southwest in the harbor Saint-Barnabé.

== Hydrology ==
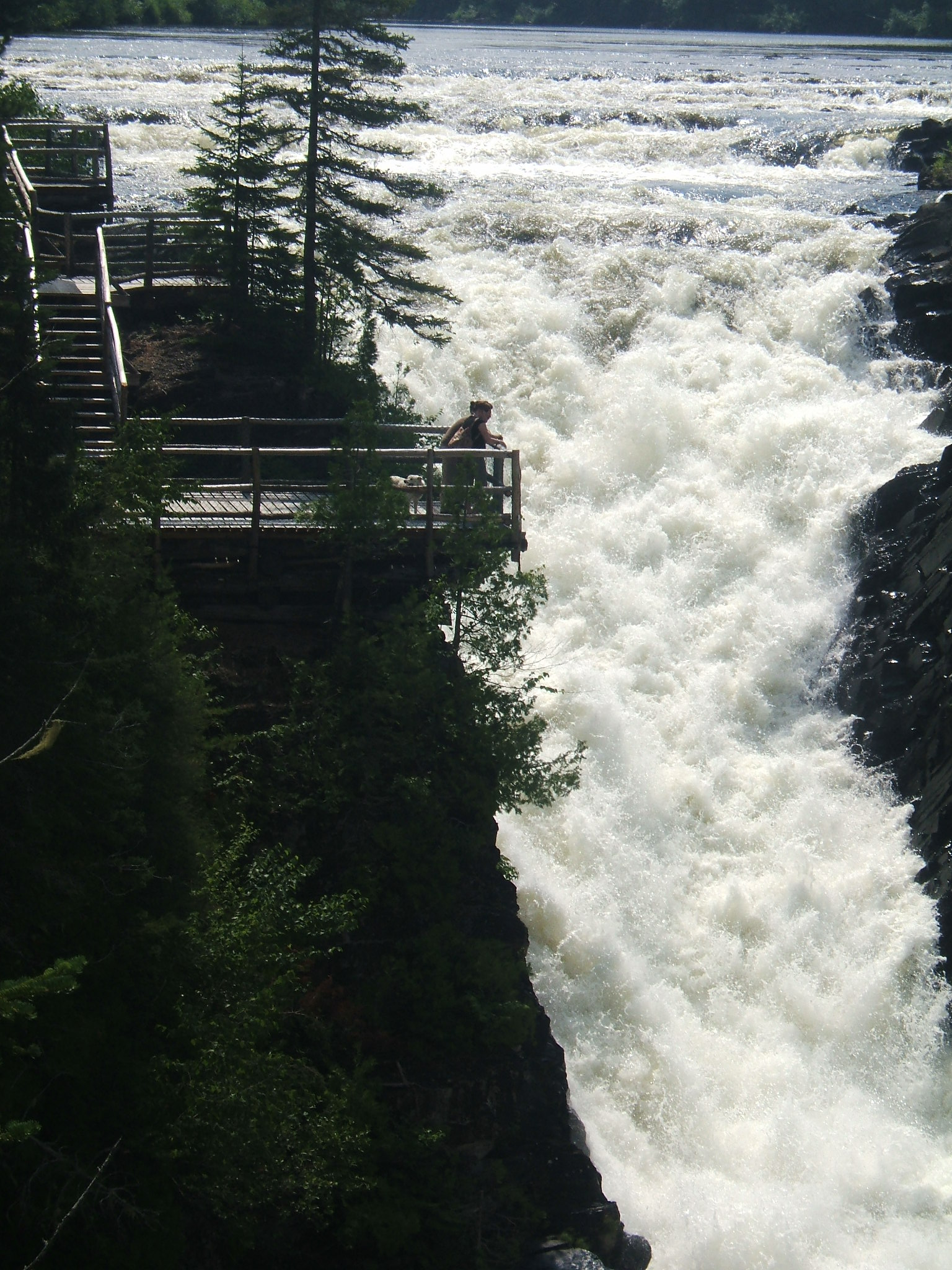
"Le Grand Sault" (The Grand Canyon) at Sault de Hell Gates

The watershed of Rimouski River covers an area of 1,635 square kilometres (631 sq mi) of which 98.6% are located in the Quebec and 1.4% in New Brunswick. The river has a Module of 30 metres (98 ft). The recorded maximum flow is 530 cubic metres per second (19,000 cu ft/s) and the minimum rate is 1.6 cubic metres per second (57 cu ft/s). It has a nivo-pluvial regime with a flood in early May and another smaller at the end of October. The river receives water from 29 streams, the main ones, from upstream to downstream, the East Rimouski River, the Grand Touradi River, the Little Touradi River and Little Rimouski River. The entire network is 2,090 kilometres (1,300 mi) streams. The basin also contains 864 lakes and 244 wetlands.

== Geology ==
The entire river basin is part of the Appalachian. These are composed of sedimentary rock dating between 505 and 360 million years. The latter are aligned in parallel with the St. Lawrence River.

== Toponymy ==
Rimouski appears in the act of concession of the Lordship of Rimouski, on April 24, 1968. According to Mgr Louis-François Richer Laflèche, the name comes from the Mi'kmaq "animouski" and mean "mansion of dog". The leader Abenaki Jos. Laurent ("Sozap Lolo Kizitôgw") noted in 1888 noted that Rimouski came from the Abenaqui Alemoski and means "earth of the dog". As for the popular sense of land moose statement by Father Cyprien Tanguay, he would never have been accredited. The name may refer to the presence of seals, also called "sea dogs" or "sea lions" near the mouth of the river.

== History ==
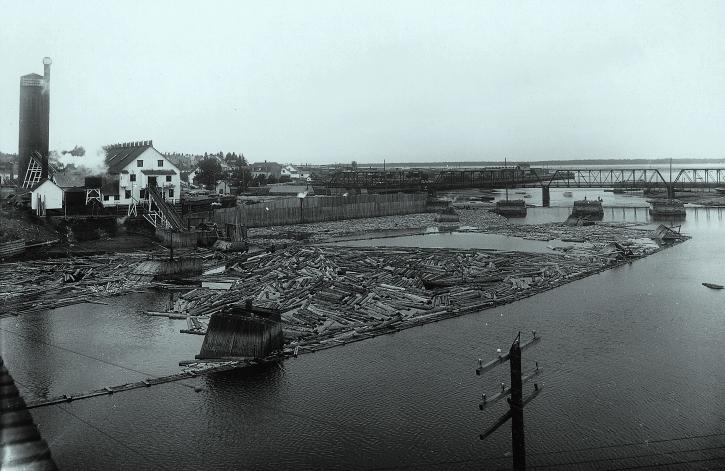
Price sawmill on Rimouski River in 1914

The history of the basin was marked by logging. The Price Brothers and Company had a virtual monopoly of this activity. The 6, a fire of Rimouski saw mill burned down 250 houses and put more 2000 people in the street.

== Demographics ==
The population of the basin was 50306 person in 2007. 85% of the population lives in Rimouski, the only city in the basin.

== Natural environment ==
47.2% of public forests are composed of stands of conifers and 23.5% of mixed forests. In private forests, 33.3% are composed of mixed forests and 23.5% are forests of deciduouss. Forests are quite young, only 2.6% are over 120 years. About 1% of forests are cut annually.

The basin includes 31 species of fish. The most common species are the brook trout (Salvelinus fontinalis), the chub (Semotilus atromaculatus), the northern pearl dace (Margariscus nachtriebi) and the red shiner belly (Phoxinus eos). The mouth of the river is a popular venue for white peach to Smelt rainbow sky (rainbow smelt). The Atlantic salmon (Salmo salar) frequents on 29 kilometres (18 mi) downstream to breed.

Four species of mammal live in the river: the Canadian beaver (Castor canadensis), the muskrat (Ondatra zibethicus), the river otter (Lontra canadensis) and the American mink (Neovison mink). We also found there 132 species of bird, 15 spécies of amphibian and six species of reptile.

== Protection of land ==
The Rimouski basin includes two wildlife reserves (Rimouski and Duchénier), two controlled harvesting zones (Rivière-Rimouski and Bas-Saint-Laurent), an outfitting and a private hunting and fishing club.

As for protected areas, there are three containment areas of deer which cover 13.9% of the territory. It also meets two heronries, five habitats muskrat and four exceptional forest ecosystems.

== See also ==
- List of rivers of Quebec
- List of rivers of New Brunswick

== Bibliography ==
- Portrait du bassin versant de la rivière Rimouski [Portrait of the watershed of the river Rimouski] (PDF) (in French). Conseil de bassin de la rivière Rimouski (Board of Rimouski River Basin. 2007.
