= Rivière des Grands Méchins Ouest =

River in Canada

- Location within Canada

Location
- Country: Canada
- Province: Quebec
- Administrative region (QC): Bas-Saint-Laurent (QC)
- MRC (QC): La Matanie Regional County Municipality (QC)
- City: Cap-Chat

Physical characteristics
- Source: Small lake
  - location: Saint-Jean-de-Cherbourg
  - coordinates: 48°54′29″N 66°58′39″W
  - elevation: 435
- Mouth: Saint Lawrence River
  - location: Les Méchins (Dalibaire (township))
  - coordinates: 48°58′36″N 66°57′13″W
  - elevation: 35 metres (115 ft)
- Length: 9.9 mi (15.9 km)

The Rivière des Grands Méchins Ouest is a tributary of the west bank of the Rivière des Grands Méchins, which flows north to the southern coast of the Saint Lawrence River where it flows into the municipality Les Méchins.

The Grands Méchins Ouest river flows northeast in the Chic-Choc Mountains, in the township of Dalibaire, in the municipality Les Méchins, in the La Matanie Regional County Municipality (MRC), in the administrative region of Bas-Saint-Laurent, in Quebec, in Canada.

== Geography ==
The Grands Méchins Ouest river takes its source from a small lake (altitude: 435 metres (1,427 ft)) located northeast of the "Lacs des Petits Chic-Chocs", and from mountain streams located in the western part of Dalibaire township, in the Chic-Choc Mountains, in the Gaspé peninsula. This source is located at 9.9 kilometres (6.2 mi) south-east of the southern coast of Gulf of St. Lawrence, at 4.4 kilometres (2.7 mi) north of the limit of Parc national de la Gaspésie and 1.2 kilometres (0.75 mi) northeast of the limit of the canton of Cherbourg.

From its source, the Grands Méchins Ouest river flows over 9.9 kilometres (6.2 mi) divided into the following segments:

- 3.9 kilometres (2.4 mi) north-east in Dalibaire township, to the confluence of a stream coming from the south-west;
- 1.1 kilometres (0.68 mi) towards the northeast in a deep valley, up to the confluence of a stream coming from the west;
- 4.9 kilometres (3.0 mi) northeasterly in a deep valley, to its confluence.

The Grands Méchins Ouest River flows on the west bank of the rivière des Grands Méchins, i.e. 3.0 kilometres (1.9 mi) south of route 132.

== Toponymy ==
The term Méchin constitutes a family name of French origin.

The toponym Rivière des Grands Méchins Ouest was made official on December 5, 1968, at the Commission de toponymie du Québec.

== See also ==
- List of rivers of Quebec
