= Rivière des Grands Méchins =

River in Canada

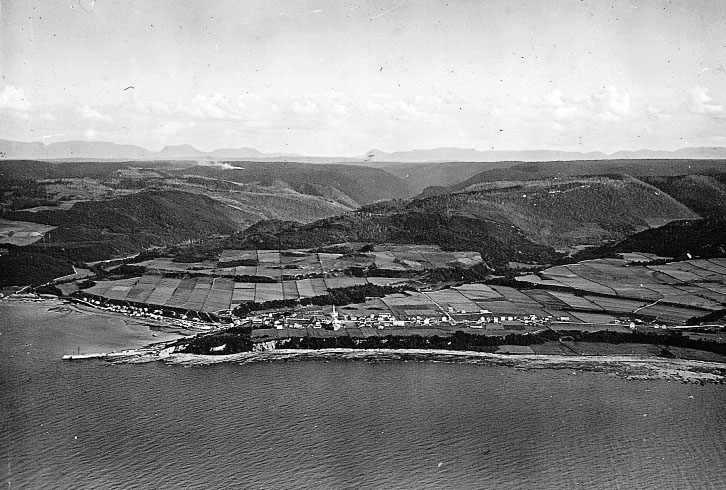

- Location within Canada

Location
- Country: Canada
- Province: Quebec
- Administrative region (QC): Bas-Saint-Laurent (QC)
- MRC (QC): La Matanie Regional County Municipality (QC)
- City: Cap-Chat

Physical characteristics
- Source: Lacs des Petits Chic-Chocs
  - location: Saint-Jean-de-Cherbourg
  - coordinates: 48°53′15″N 66°59′42″W
  - elevation: 569
- Mouth: Saint Lawrence River
  - location: Les Méchins
  - coordinates: 49°00′11″N 66°58′12″W
  - elevation: 0 metres (0 ft)
- Length: 22.8 mi (36.7 km)

Basin features
- Tributaries
  - left: Rivière des Grands Méchins Ouest, décharge du Petit lac du Moulin

The Rivière des Grands Méchins is a tributary on the south coast of the St. Lawrence River where it flows into the municipality of Les Méchins. It flows northwards in the Chic-Choc Mountains, in the canton of Cherbourg (municipality of Saint-Jean-de-Cherbourg), then the canton of Dalibaire (municipality of Méchins), in the La Matanie Regional County Municipality (MRC), in the administrative region of Bas-Saint-Laurent, in Quebec, in Canada.

== Geography ==
The Grands Méchins river takes its source from a small lake (altitude: 495 metres (1,624 ft)) among the Petits Chic-Chocs lakes and mountain streams located in the eastern part of the canton of Cherbourg, in the Chic-Chocs mountains, in the Gaspé peninsula. This source is located at 11.0 kilometres (6.8 mi) south-east of the southern coast of Gulf of St. Lawrence, at 2.2 kilometres (1.4 mi) north of the limit of Parc national de la Gaspésie and 1.4 kilometres (0.87 mi) to the southwest of the Dalibaire township limit.

From its source, the Grands Méchins river flows over 22.8 kilometres (14.2 mi) divided into the following segments:

- 2.6 kilometres (1.6 mi) eastward in the canton of Cherbourg, up to the limit of the canton of Dalibaire (municipality of Méchins);
- 9.5 kilometres (5.9 mi) north-east in a deep valley, up to a bend in the river;
- 6.5 kilometres (4.0 mi) north-west in a deep valley, up to the confluence of the rivière des Grands Méchins Ouest;
- 4.2 kilometres (2.6 mi) north in a deep valley, crossing at the end of the segment in the middle of the village of Méchins and passing under the route 132 bridge, up to its confluence.

The Grands Méchins river flows from the southwest side of the Méchins cove on a beach that can extend up to 0.2 kilometres (0.12 mi) at low tide. This confluence is located 23.0 kilometres (14.3 mi) southwest of downtown Cap-Chat, at 3.9 kilometres (2.4 mi) southwest of the confluence of the Rivière des Petits Méchins and at 9.3 kilometres (5.8 mi) southwest of the confluence of the rivière des Grands Capucins. Anse des Méchins extends 3.0 kilometres (1.9 mi) on the coast of the estuary of Saint Lawrence, between the cap Le Gros Machins (west side) and Cap des Méchins (east side). The mountain of Ilets, located east of the village of Méchins, dominates the cove of Méchins.

== Toponymy ==
The term Méchin constitutes a family name of French origin.

The toponym Rivière des Grands Méchins was formalized on December 5, 1968, at the Commission de toponymie du Québec.

== See also ==
- List of rivers of Quebec
