= Saint-Adelme =

- Parish municipality
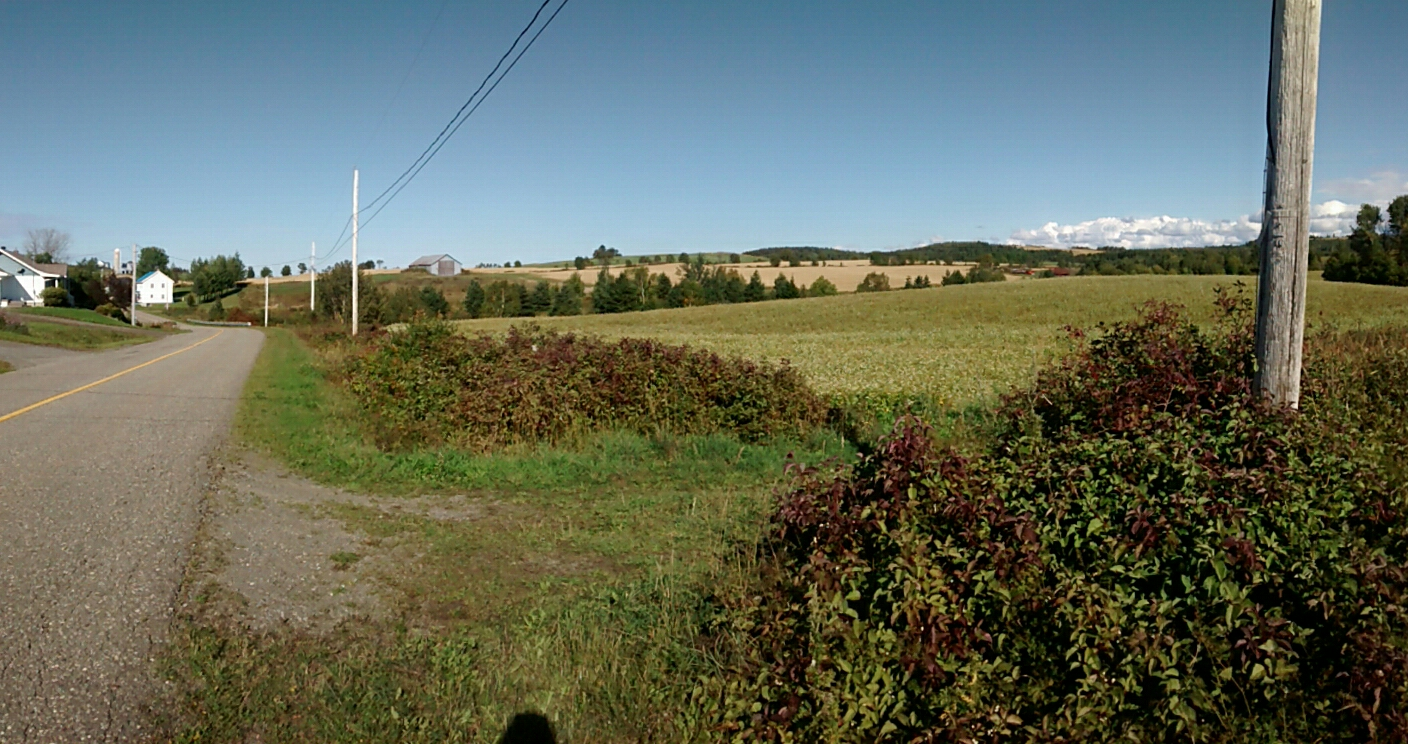

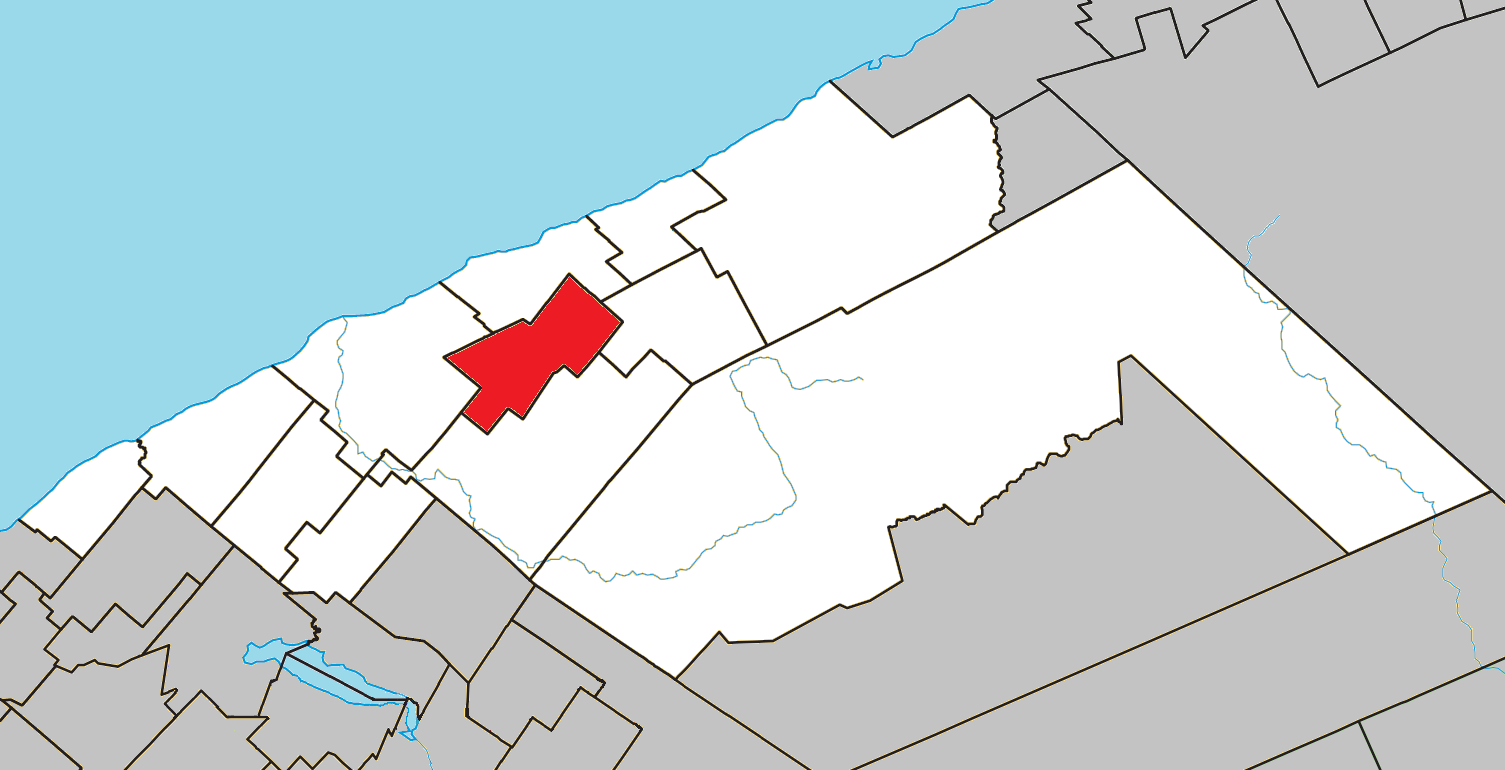
- Location within La Matanie RCM

- Location in eastern Quebec
- Coordinates: 48°49′N 67°19′W
- Country: Canada
- Province: Quebec
- Region: Bas-Saint-Laurent
- RCM: La Matanie
- Settled: early 20th century
- Constituted: September 9, 1933

Government
  - Mayor: Christian Gauthier
  - Federal riding: Gaspésie—Les Îles-de-la-Madeleine—Listuguj
  - Prov. riding: Matane-Matapédia-Mitis

Area
  - Total: 102.35 km^{2} (39.52 sq mi)
  - Land: 100.58 km^{2} (38.83 sq mi)

Population (2021)
  - Total: 484
  - Density: 4.8/km^{2} (12/sq mi)
  - Pop (2016-21): ▼6.9%
  - Dwellings: 291
- Time zone: UTC−5 (EST)
  - Summer (DST): UTC−4 (EDT)
- Postal code(s): G0J 2B0
- Area codes: 418 and 581
- Highways: No major routes
- Website: municipalite.st-adelme.ca

Saint-Adelme (French pronunciation: [sɛ̃t‿adɛlm]) is a parish municipality in the Canadian province of Quebec, located in La Matanie Regional County Municipality in the Bas-Saint-Laurent region.

== History ==
In 1864, the area was surveyed and the geographic township of Saint-Denis was created. The Mission of Saint-Denis was founded in 1916, but real growth came in the 1920s, during the period of colonization of the Chic-Chocs plateau. For unknown reasons, the place, that was originally known as Saint-Denis, came to be called Saint-Adelme.

In 1933, its post office opened. On September 9 that same year, the Parish Municipality of Saint-Adelme was formed out of territory ceded by the Parish Municipalities of Saint-Jérôme-de-Matane and Sainte-Félicité, as well as some previously unorganized territory.

== Demographics ==
In the 2021 Census of Population conducted by Statistics Canada, Saint-Adelme had a population of 484 living in 223 of its 291 total private dwellings, a change of −6.9% from its 2016 population of 520. With a land area of 100.58 km^{2} (38.83 sq mi), it had a population density of 4.8/km^{2} (12.5/sq mi) in 2021.

Canada census – Saint-Adelme community profile

	2021	2016	2011
Population	484 (-6.9% from 2016)	520 (+7.2% from 2011)	485 (-2.4% from 2006)
Land area	100.58 km^{2} (38.83 sq mi)	100.64 km^{2} (38.86 sq mi)	100.46 km^{2} (38.79 sq mi)
Population density	4.8/km^{2} (12/sq mi)	5.2/km^{2} (13/sq mi)	4.8/km^{2} (12/sq mi)
Median age	55.6 (M: 58.4, F: 51.6)	50.9 (M: 53.4, F: 48.3)	51.3 (M: 51.7, F: 50.8)
Private dwellings	291 (total) 223 (occupied)	323 (total) 222 (occupied)	321 (total)
Median household income	$62,400	$53,035	$37,234

Notes: 2016 Data based on population and dwelling count amendments.
References: 2021 2016 2011

Historical census populations – Saint-Adelme, Quebec

Year	Pop.	±%
1941	972	—
1951	1,253	+28.9%
1956	1,250	−0.2%
1961	1,257	+0.6%
1966	1,093	−13.0%
1971	934	−14.5%

Year	Pop.	±%
1976	738	−21.0%
1981	618	−16.3%
1986	622	+0.6%
1991	566	−9.0%
1996	543	−4.1%
2001	530	−2.4%

Year	Pop.	±%
2006	497	−6.2%
2011	485	−2.4%
2016	520	+7.2%
2021	484	−6.9%

2016 Population figures based on revised counts.
Source: Statistics Canada

== Government ==
List of former mayors:

- Moïse Ross (1933–1939, 1941–1945)
- Philippe Thibault (1939–1941)
- Yvon Turcotte (1945–1947, 1950–1951)
- Cyprien Imbeault (1947–1950)
- Louis Lebreux (1951–1955)
- Hector Collin (1955–1957)
- Lucien Gagnon (1957–1959)
- Antonin Harrisson (1959–1961)
- Philias Gagné (1961–1973)
- Gilbert Bélanger (1973–1976)
- Charles Émile Collin (1976–1977)
- Marie Laure Lebreux
- Jean Claude Labrie
- Violette Bernier
- Yvan Imbeault (2005–2013)
- Jean-Roland Lebrun (2013–2021)
- Josée Marquis (2021-2025)
- Christian Gauthier (2025–present)

== See also ==
- List of parish municipalities in Quebec
