= Saint-Léandre =

- Parish municipality
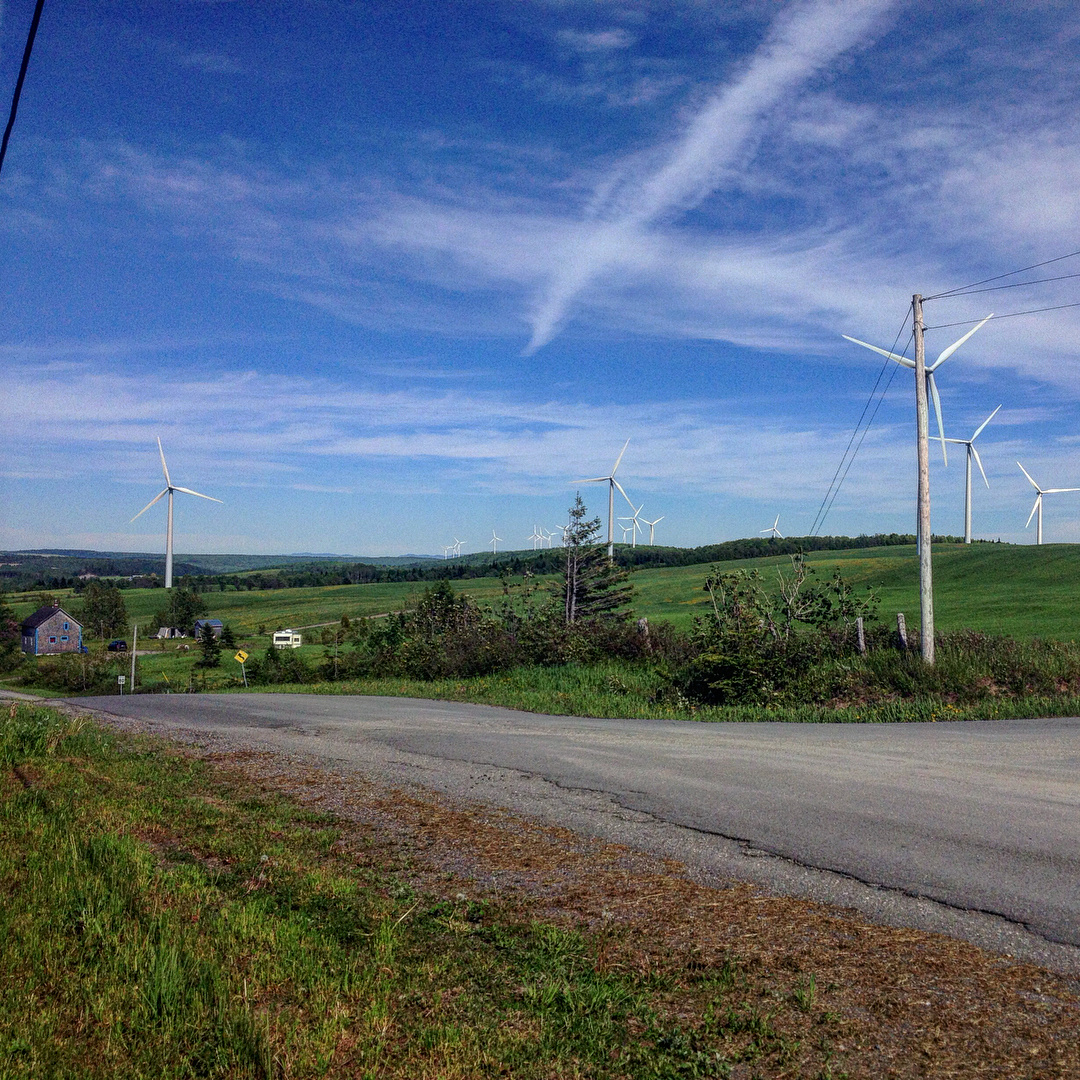

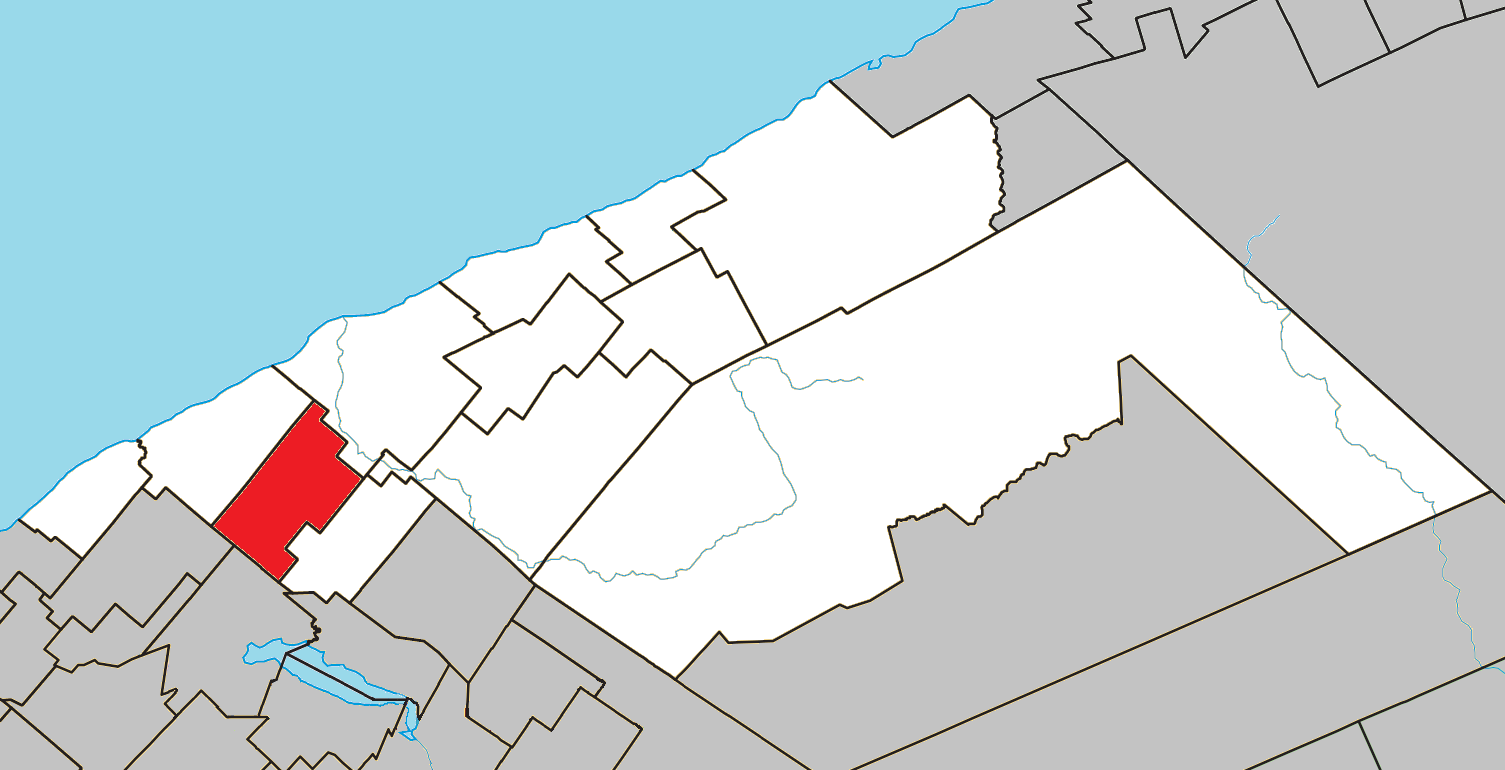
- Location within La Matanie RCM

- Location in eastern Quebec
- Coordinates: 48°44′N 67°36′W
- Country: Canada
- Province: Quebec
- Region: Bas-Saint-Laurent
- RCM: La Matanie
- Settled: ca. 1900
- Constituted: March 30, 1912

Government
  - Mayor: Robert Tremblay
  - Fed. riding: Gaspésie—Les Îles-de-la-Madeleine—Listuguj
  - Prov. riding: Matane-Matapédia-Mitis

Area
  - Total: 105.76 km^{2} (40.83 sq mi)
  - Land: 104.72 km^{2} (40.43 sq mi)

Population (2021)
  - Total: 375
  - Density: 3.6/km^{2} (9.3/sq mi)
  - Change 2016-21: ▼6.3%
  - Dwellings: 222
- Time zone: UTC−5 (EST)
  - Summer (DST): UTC−4 (EDT)
- Postal code(s): G0J 2V0
- Area codes: 418, 581
- Highways: No major routes
- Website: www.st-leandre.ca

Saint-Léandre (French pronunciation: [sɛ̃ leɑ̃dʁ]) is a parish municipality in the Canadian province of Quebec, located in La Matanie Regional County Municipality.

== History ==
The Parish of Saint-Léandre was founded in 1900, named after the first settler of the place, Léandre Bernier. In 1902, its post office opened.

On March 30, 1912, the Parish Municipality of Saint-Léandre was formed when it ceded from the Parish Municipality of Saint-Ulric.

== Demographics ==
In the 2021 Census of Population conducted by Statistics Canada, Saint-Léandre had a population of 375 living in 188 of its 222 total private dwellings, a change of −6.3% from its 2016 population of 400. With a land area of 104.72 km^{2} (40.43 sq mi), it had a population density of 3.6/km^{2} (9.3/sq mi) in 2021.

Canada census – Saint-Léandre community profile

	2021	2016	2011
Population	375 (-6.3% from 2016)	400 (-0.5% from 2011)	402 (+0.2% from 2006)
Land area	104.72 km^{2} (40.43 sq mi)	105.01 km^{2} (40.54 sq mi)	105.52 km^{2} (40.74 sq mi)
Population density	3.6/km^{2} (9.3/sq mi)	3.8/km^{2} (9.8/sq mi)	3.8/km^{2} (9.8/sq mi)
Median age	52.4 (M: 53.2, F: 50.4)	48.6 (M: 49.5, F: 45.8)	48.4 (M: 48.3, F: 48.5)
Private dwellings	222 (total) 188 (occupied)	209 (total)	200 (total)
Median household income	$58,000	$47,008	$48,154

References: 2021 2016 2011

Historical census populations – Saint-Léandre, Quebec

Year	Pop.	±%
1921	647	—
1931	657	+1.5%
1941	786	+19.6%
1951	725	−7.8%
1956	790	+9.0%
1961	877	+11.0%

Year	Pop.	±%
1966	736	−16.1%
1971	673	−8.6%
1976	543	−19.3%
1981	513	−5.5%
1986	436	−15.0%
1991	396	−9.2%

Year	Pop.	±%
1996	401	+1.3%
2001	380	−5.2%
2006	401	+5.5%
2011	402	+0.2%
2016	400	−0.5%
2021	375	−6.2%

Source: Statistics Canada

== Government ==
List of former mayors:

- Roger Bernier (...–2009)
- Raymond Chouinard (2009–2013)
- Jean-Pierre Chouinard (2013–2017)
- Steve Castonguay (2017–2025)
- Robert Tremblay (2025-present)

== See also ==
- List of parish municipalities in Quebec
