= Les Méchins =

- Municipality
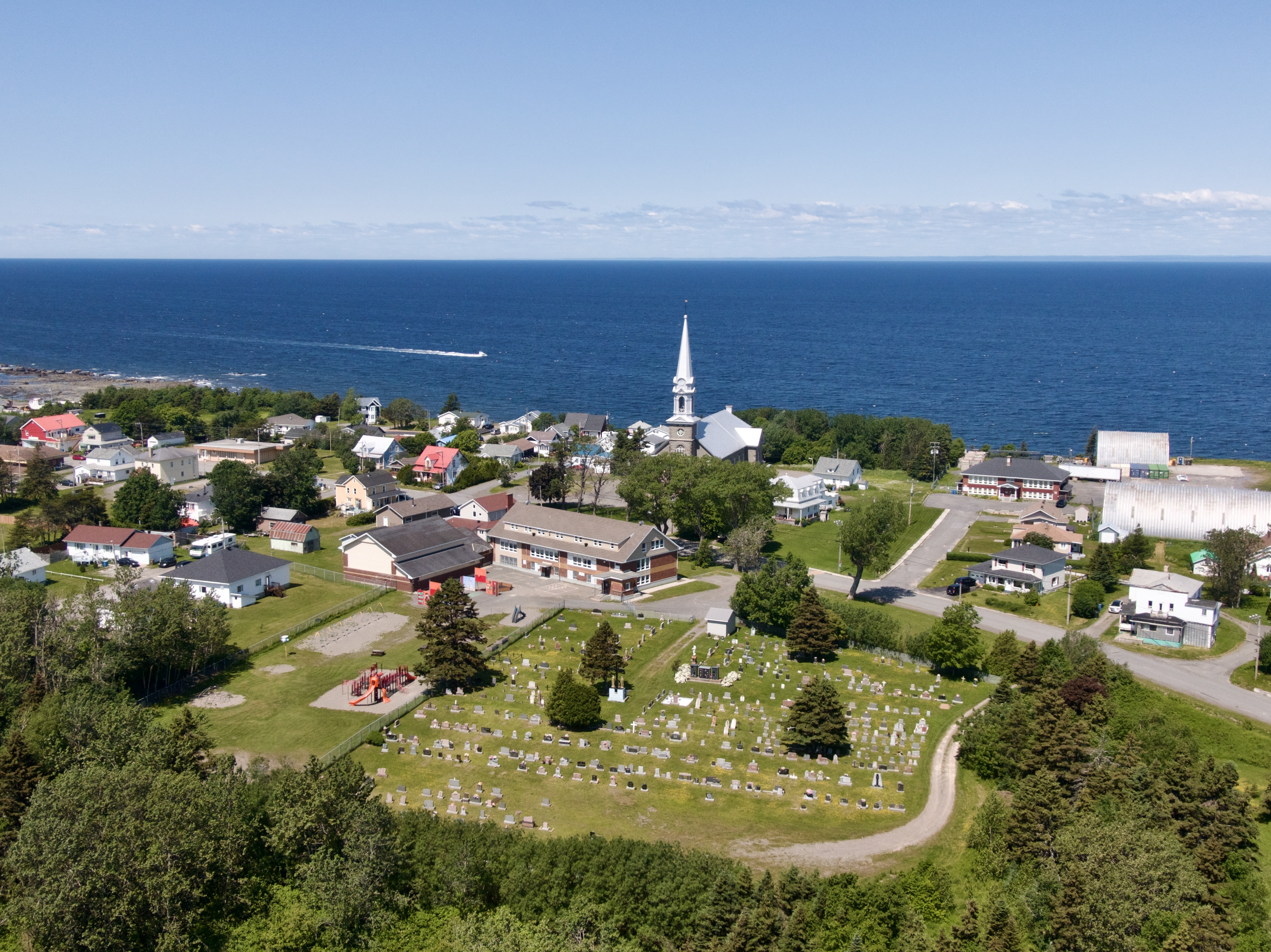
- View of downtown Les Méchins, Quebec

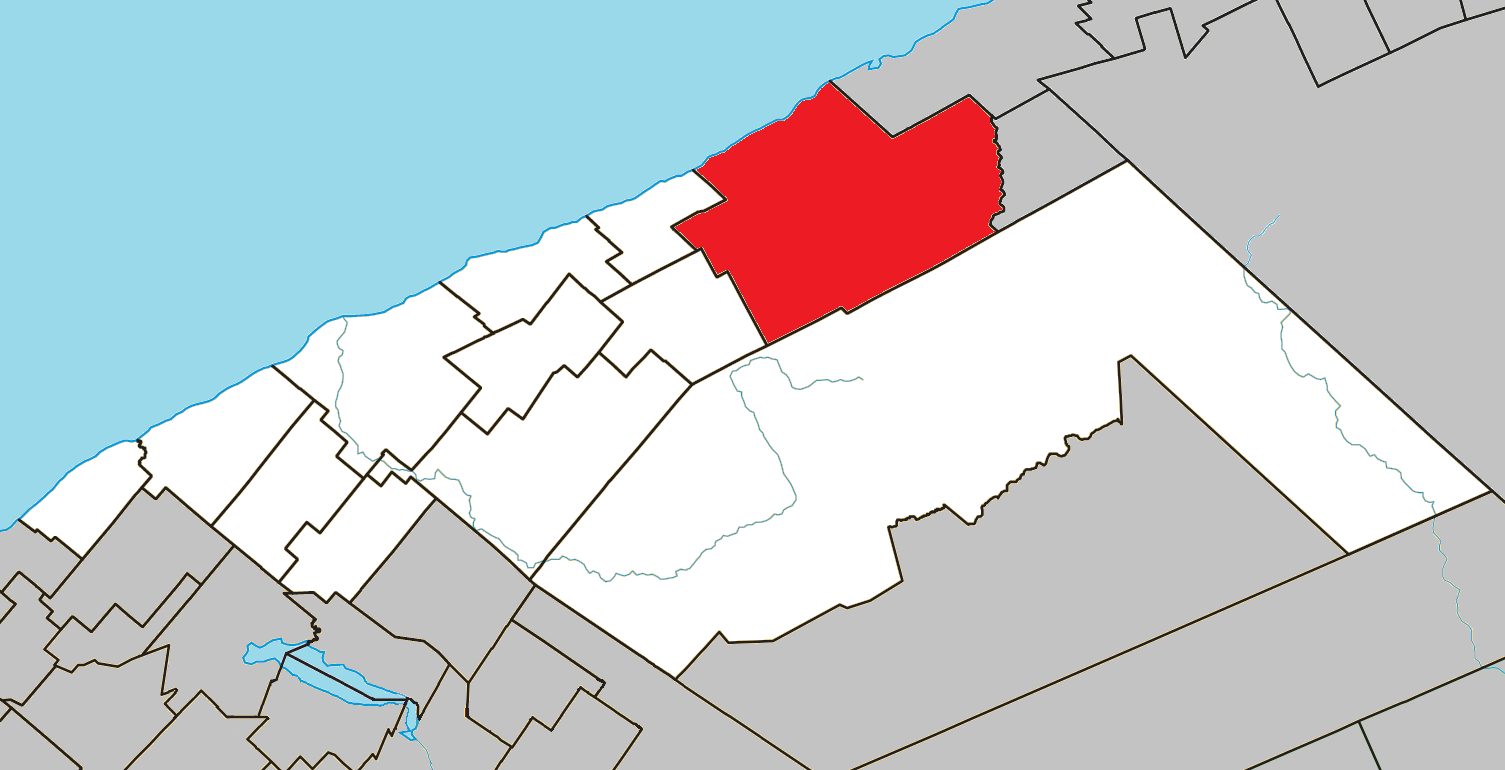
- Location within La Matanie RCM

- Location in eastern Quebec
- Coordinates: 49°00′N 66°59′W
- Country: Canada
- Province: Quebec
- Region: Bas-Saint-Laurent
- RCM: La Matanie
- Settled: 1850s
- Constituted: November 27, 1982

Government
  - Mayor: Mathieu Isabel
  - Federal riding: Gaspésie—Les Îles-de-la-Madeleine—Listuguj
  - Prov. riding: Matane-Matapédia-Mitis

Area
  - Total: 474.31 km^{2} (183.13 sq mi)
  - Land: 441.39 km^{2} (170.42 sq mi)

Population (2021)
  - Total: 995
  - Density: 2.3/km^{2} (6.0/sq mi)
  - Pop (2016-21): ▲0.8%
  - Dwellings: 671
- Time zone: UTC−5 (EST)
  - Summer (DST): UTC−4 (EDT)
- Postal code(s): G0J 1T0
- Area codes: 418 and 581
- Highways: R-132
- Website: www.lesmechins.com

Les Méchins (French pronunciation: [le meʃɛ̃]) is a municipality in Quebec, Canada, about 47 kilometres (29 mi) east of Matane along Quebec Route 132.

In addition to Les Méchins (formerly known as Grands-Méchins) itself, the municipality also includes the communities of Anse-des-Méchins, Cherbourg, Cherbourg-Centre, Les Îlets Méchins, and Petits-Méchins.

The name Méchins is of uncertain origin although according to one theory, it may come from the French word méchants, meaning "wicked", and referring to rocks in the sea that would make navigation there dangerous. Another, less likely suggestion is that it may be a transformation of "Matsi", a 2.5 metres (8 ft 2 in) tall one-eyed monster of Mi'kmaq folklore who would come down from the mountains with a stick as big as a tree to terrorize the local people.

== History ==
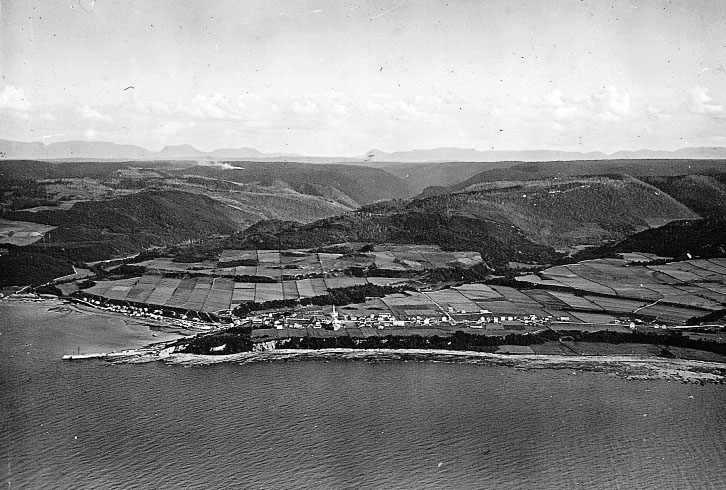
Grands-Mechins in 1930

Colonization began in 1859 when three families arrived. By 1865, it had grown to 119 inhabitants. The Mission of Saint-Édouard was established in 1876 and the following year, the area was incorporated as the United Township Municipality of Dalibaire-et-Romieu. In 1880, the chapel was completed and its registers were opened. From that year onward, the place experienced a development boom due to the founding of a herring smokehouse and maritime industry, including ship building in the late 19th century.

While Méchins became a separate municipality in 1952, it was not until 1982 that the current Municipality of Méchins was formed through the merger of Méchins with Saint-Paulin-Dalibaire (formed in 1954) and Saint-Thomas-de-Cherbourg (formed in 1954).

== Geography ==
Les Méchins is located on the south slope of the St. Lawrence River, 455 kilometres (283 mi) northeast of Quebec City and 140 kilometres (87 mi) northeast of Rimouski. Major towns near Les Méchins are Sainte-Anne-des-Monts, 40 kilometres (25 mi) east, and Matane, 45 kilometres (28 mi) southwest. Les Méchins is located on Route 132 in its loop around the Gaspé Peninsula between Grosses-Roches to the southwest and Cap-Chat to the northeast. The territory of Les Méchins covers an area of 474 square kilometres (183 sq mi).

From the Petits Chic-Chocs lakes, in the southwest of the municipality, the Rivière des Grands Méchins crosses the municipality towards the north until its confluence with the estuary of St. Lawrence. From the river source in the southwest, the Rivière des Grands Méchins Ouest flows towards the northeast until its confluence with the Rivière des Grands Méchins. From Xavier Lake, in the east of the municipality, the Grands Capucins River flows towards the northeast. The Cap-Chat River delimits the east of the municipality.

== Demographics ==
Canada census – Les Méchins community profile

	2021	2016	2011
Population	995 (+0.8% from 2016)	987 (-10.8% from 2011)	1,107 (-3.6% from 2006)
Land area	441.39 km^{2} (170.42 sq mi)	443.40 km^{2} (171.20 sq mi)	441.77 km^{2} (170.57 sq mi)
Population density	2.3/km^{2} (6.0/sq mi)	2.2/km^{2} (5.7/sq mi)	2.5/km^{2} (6.5/sq mi)
Median age	59.2 (M: 58.8, F: 59.6)	56.8 (M: 56.9, F: 56.8)	53.1 (M: 53.3, F: 53.0)
Private dwellings	671 (total) 519 (occupied)	753 (total)	699 (total)
Median household income	$44,800	$40,576	$36,887

References: 2021 2016 2011

Historical Census Data - Les Méchins, Quebec

Year	Pop.	±%
1881	520	—
1891	661	+27.1%
1901	802	+21.3%
1911	1,006	+25.4%
1921	800	−20.5%
1931	1,201	+50.1%
1941	1,598	+33.1%
1951	2,804	+75.5%

Year	Pop.	±%
1956	1,495	−46.7%
1961	1,525	+2.0%
1966	1,438	−5.7%
1971	1,504	+4.6%
1976	1,459	−3.0%
1981	1,490	+2.1%
1986	1,491	+0.1%
1991	1,339	−10.2%

Year	Pop.	±%
1996	1,280	−4.4%
2001	1,220	−4.7%
2006	1,148	−5.9%
2011	1,107	−3.6%
2016	987	−10.8%
2021	995	+0.8%

Population counts are not adjusted for boundary changes.
Source: Statistics Canada

Mother tongue (2021):

- English as first language: 0.5%
- French as first language: 98.5%
- English and French as first language: 0.5%
- Other as first language: 0.5%

== See also ==
- List of municipalities in Quebec
