= Grosses-Roches =

- Municipality
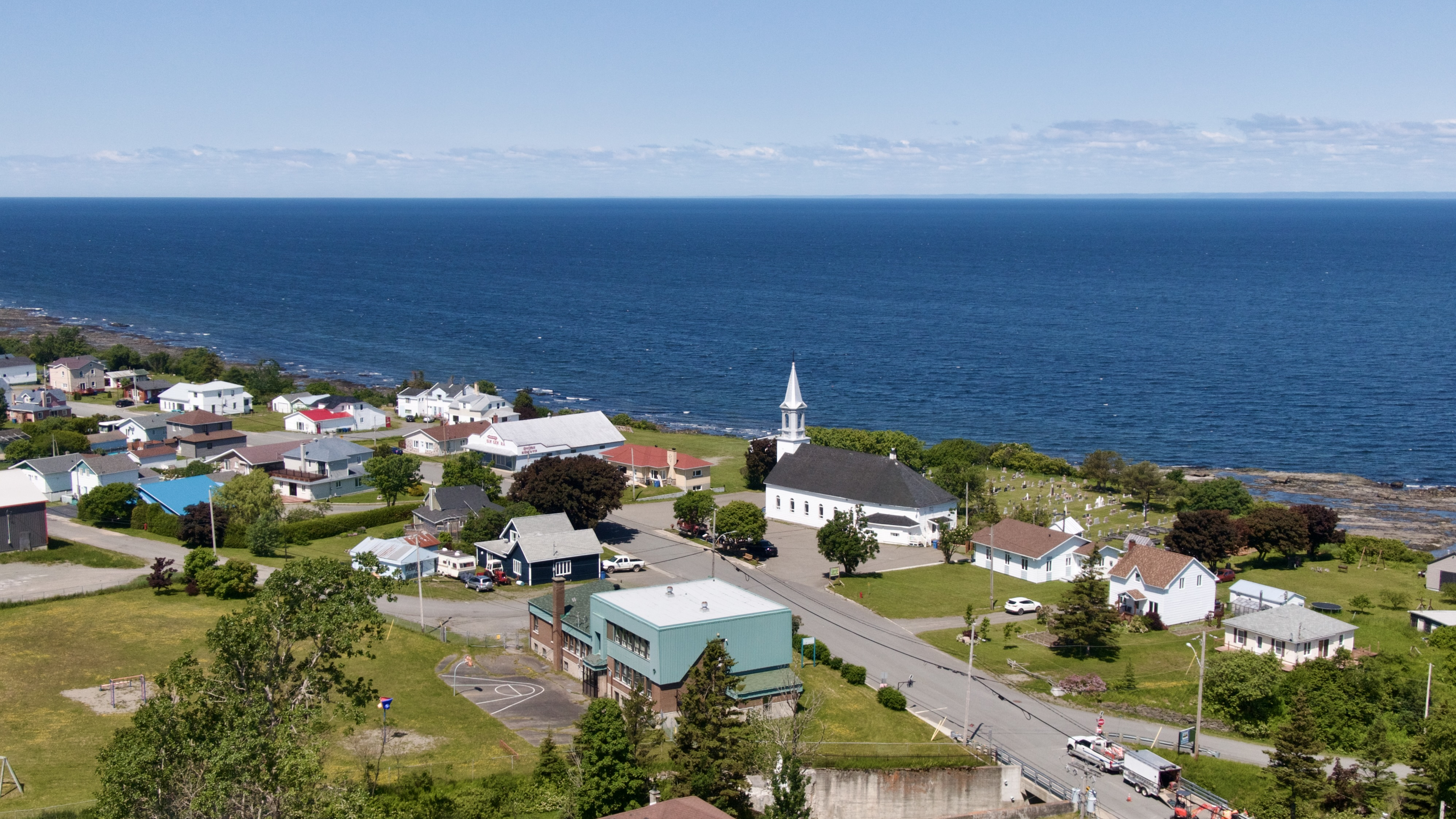
- Skyline of Grosses-Roches in 2025

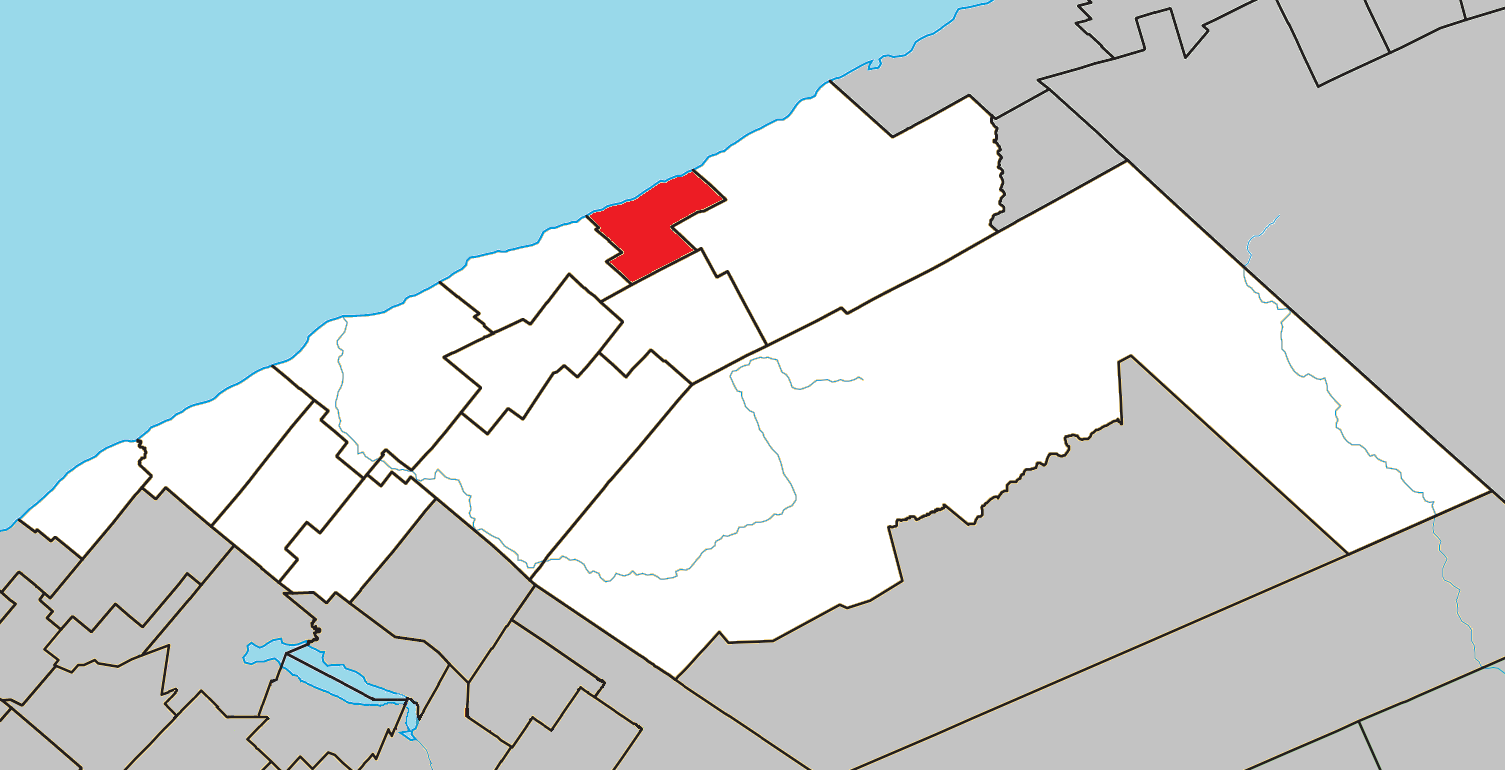
- Location within La Matanie RCM

- Location in eastern Quebec
- Coordinates: 48°56′N 67°10′W
- Country: Canada
- Province: Quebec
- Region: Bas-Saint-Laurent
- RCM: La Matanie
- Settled: mid 19th century
- Constituted: August 19, 1939

Government
  - Mayor: Bruno Fournier
  - Federal riding: Gaspésie—Les Îles-de-la-Madeleine—Listuguj
  - Prov. riding: Matane-Matapédia-Mitis

Area
  - Total: 63.95 km^{2} (24.69 sq mi)
  - Land: 63.59 km^{2} (24.55 sq mi)

Population (2021)
  - Total: 375
  - Density: 5.9/km^{2} (15/sq mi)
  - Pop (2016-21): ▼4.8%
  - Dwellings: 261
- Time zone: UTC−5 (EST)
  - Summer (DST): UTC−4 (EDT)
- Postal code(s): G0J 1K0
- Area codes: 418 and 581
- Highways: R-132
- Website: municipalite.grossesroches.ca

Grosses-Roches (French pronunciation: [ɡʁos ʁɔʃ]) is a municipality in Quebec, Canada.

== History ==
Settlement began in the mid-19th century and the place was called Grosses-Roches (French for "big rocks"), referring to a large number of small, rounded, brownish rocks. In 1870, the parish of Saints-Sept-Frères was founded. In 1881, the post office opened.

On August 19, 1939, the Municipality of Grosses-Roches was formed when it ceded from the Parish Municipality of Sainte-Félicité.

== Demographics ==
In the 2021 Census of Population conducted by Statistics Canada, Grosses-Roches had a population of 375 living in 206 of its 261 total private dwellings, a change of −4.8% from its 2016 population of 394. With a land area of 63.59 km^{2} (24.55 sq mi), it had a population density of 5.9/km^{2} (15.3/sq mi) in 2021.

Canada census – Grosses-Roches community profile

	2021	2016	2011
Population	375 (-4.8% from 2016)	394 (-4.1% from 2011)	411 (-1.2% from 2006)
Land area	63.59 km^{2} (24.55 sq mi)	64.00 km^{2} (24.71 sq mi)	63.65 km^{2} (24.58 sq mi)
Population density	5.9/km^{2} (15/sq mi)	6.2/km^{2} (16/sq mi)	6.5/km^{2} (17/sq mi)
Median age	61.2 (M: 62.4, F: 58.8)	59.1 (M: 59.9, F: 58.1)	52.9 (M: 54.1, F: 51.7)
Private dwellings	261 (total) 206 (occupied)	280 (total) 209 (occupied)	250 (total)
Median household income	$41,600	$34,432	$28,942

Notes: 2016 Data based on population and dwelling count amendments.
References: 2021 2016 2011

Historical Census Data - Grosses-Roches, Quebec

Year	Pop.	±%
1941	807	—
1951	886	+9.8%
1956	904	+2.0%
1961	804	−11.1%
1966	697	−13.3%
1971	639	−8.3%

Year	Pop.	±%
1976	599	−6.3%
1981	561	−6.3%
1986	580	+3.4%
1991	517	−10.9%
1996	493	−4.6%
2001	457	−7.3%

Year	Pop.	±%
2006	416	−9.0%
2011	411	−1.2%
2016	394	−4.1%
2021	375	−4.8%

2016 Population based on revised count.
Source: Statistics Canada

== Government ==
List of former mayors:

- Victoire Marin (...–2013)
- André Morin (2013–2017)
- Victoire Marin (2017–2021)
- Jonathan Massé (2021–2024)
- Bruno Fournier (2024–present)

== See also ==
- List of municipalities in Quebec
