= Saint-Ulric =

- Municipality
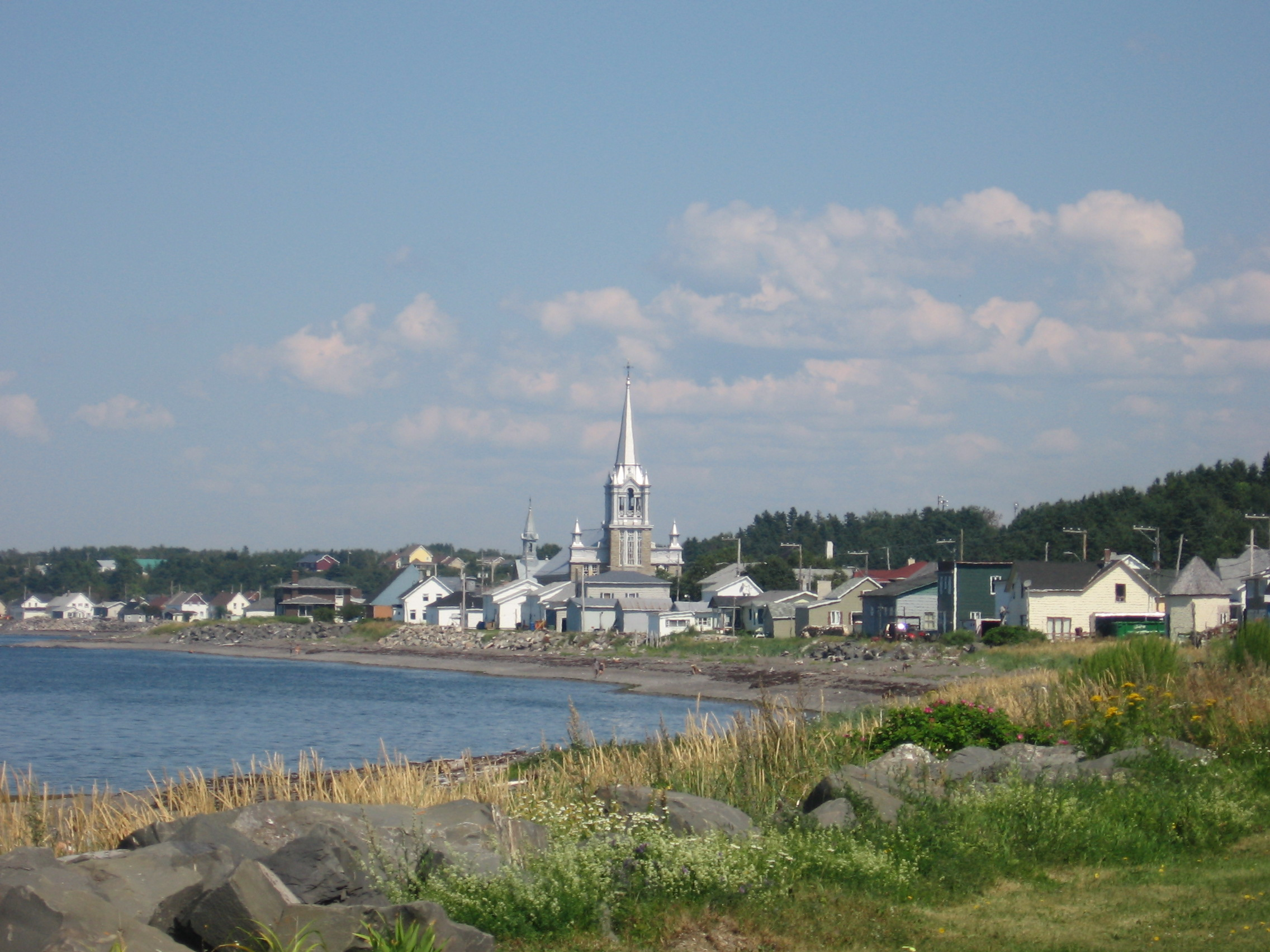
- Saint-Ulric seen from the Sr. Lawrence River

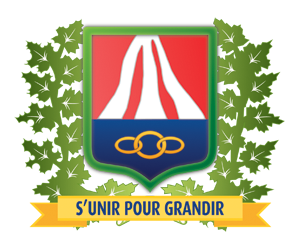
- Coat of arms

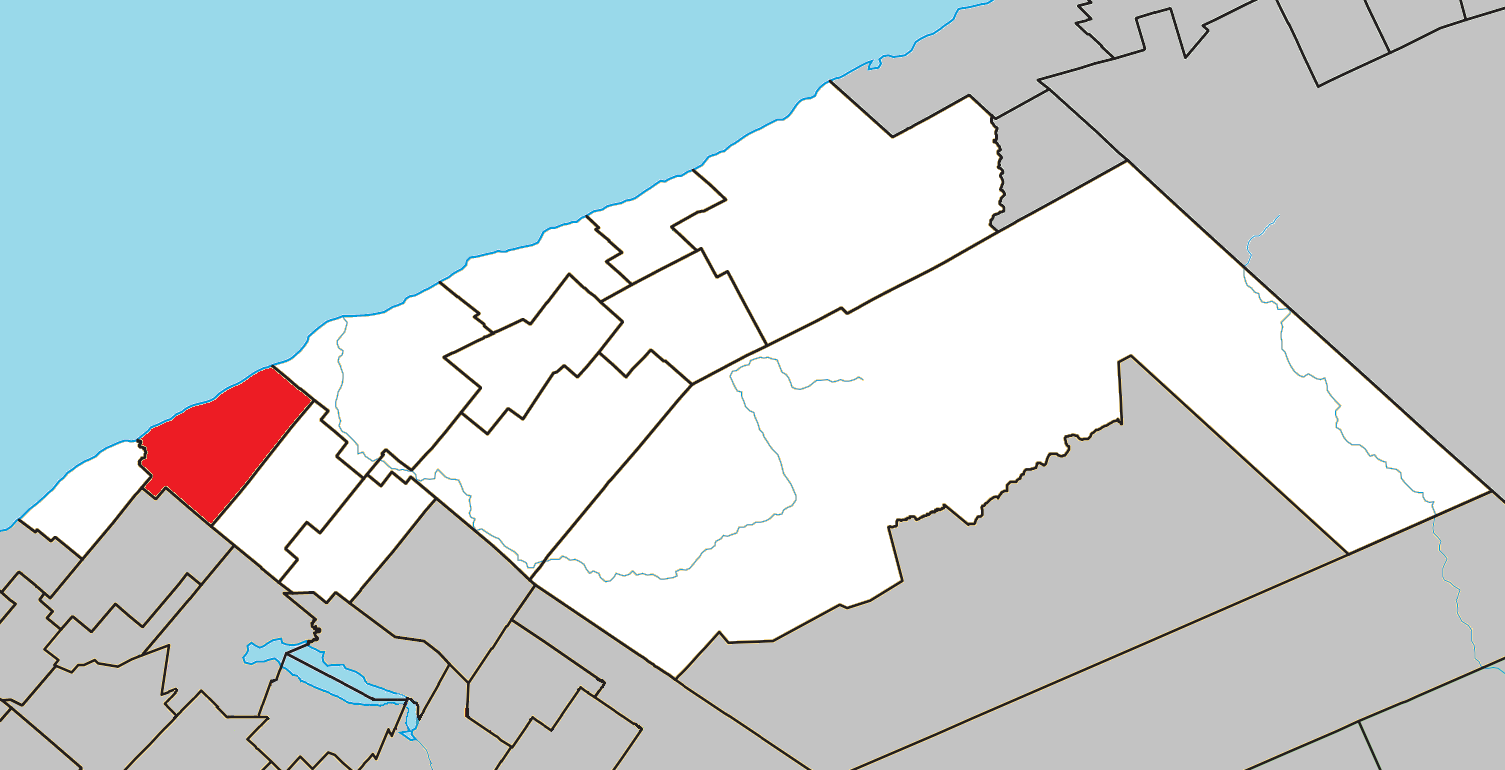
- Location within La Matanie RCM

- Location in eastern Quebec
- Coordinates: 48°47′N 67°42′W
- Country: Canada
- Province: Quebec
- Region: Bas-Saint-Laurent
- RCM: La Matanie
- Constituted: January 12, 2000

Government
  - Mayor: Gaétan Bergeron
  - Federal riding: Gaspésie—Les Îles-de-la-Madeleine—Listuguj
  - Prov. riding: Matane-Matapédia-Mitis

Area
  - Total: 121.83 km^{2} (47.04 sq mi)
  - Land: 120.45 km^{2} (46.51 sq mi)

Population (2021)
  - Total: 1,567
  - Density: 13/km^{2} (34/sq mi)
  - Pop (2016-21): ▼1.1%
  - Dwellings: 912
- Time zone: UTC−5 (EST)
  - Summer (DST): UTC−4 (EDT)
- Postal code(s): G0J 3H0
- Area codes: 418 and 581
- Highways: R-132
- Website: www.st-ulric.ca

Saint-Ulric (French pronunciation: [sɛ̃t‿ylʁik]) is a municipality in the Regional County Municipality of La Matanie, in the province of Quebec, Canada. The population as of the 2021 Canadian census was 1,567.

On January 12, 2000, the Village Municipality of Saint-Ulric and Parish Municipality of Saint-Ulric-de-Matane were merged to form the Municipality of Rivière-Blanche, renamed to Saint-Ulric on November 11, 2000.

== Demographics ==
=== Population ===
Canada census – Saint-Ulric community profile

	2021	2016	2011
Population	1,567 (-1.1% from 2016)	1,585 (-3.5% from 2011)	1,642 (-3.2% from 2006)
Land area	120.45 km^{2} (46.51 sq mi)	120.65 km^{2} (46.58 sq mi)	120.74 km^{2} (46.62 sq mi)
Population density	13.0/km^{2} (34/sq mi)	13.1/km^{2} (34/sq mi)	13.6/km^{2} (35/sq mi)
Median age	55.6 (M: 56.8, F: 54.4)	52.4 (M: 52.8, F: 52.2)	50.4 (M: 50.0, F: 50.7)
Private dwellings	912 (total) 781 (occupied)	878 (total) 755 (occupied)	912 (total)
Median household income	$62,800	$52,523	$50,077

References: 2021 2016 2011

Historical Census Data - Saint-Ulric, Quebec
Year	Pop.	±%
2001	1,649	—
2006	1,696	+2.9%
2011	1,642	−3.2%
2016	1,585	−3.5%
2021	1,567	−1.1%
Source: Statistics Canada

=== Language ===
Mother tongue (2021)	Population	Pct (%)
French only	1,530	97.5%
English only	15	1.0%
Both English and French	10	0.6%
Other languages	10	0.6%

== See also ==
- List of municipalities in Quebec
