= Sainte-Félicité, Bas-Saint-Laurent =

Sainte-Félicité
- Municipality
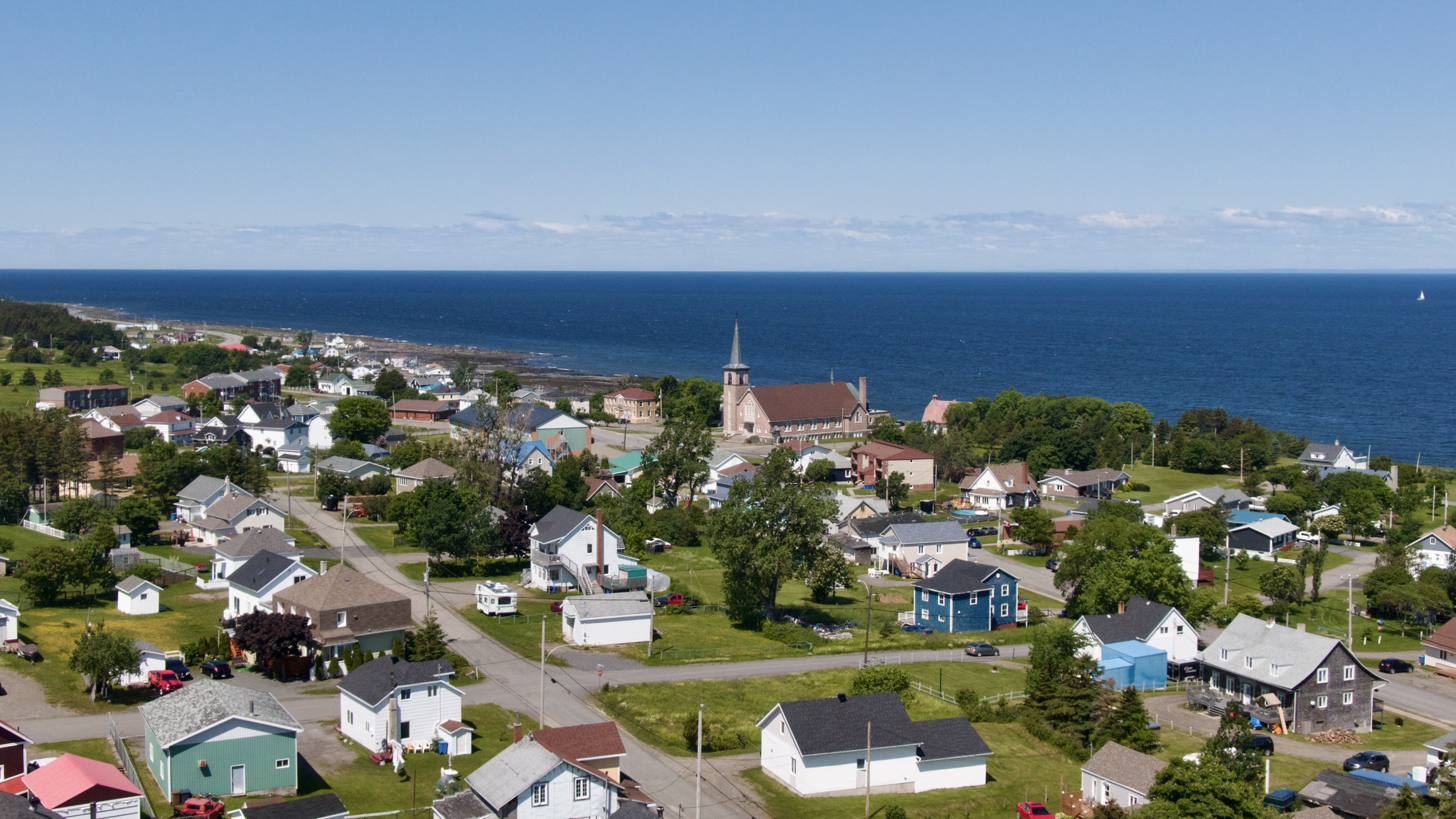
- Skyline of Sainte-Félicité

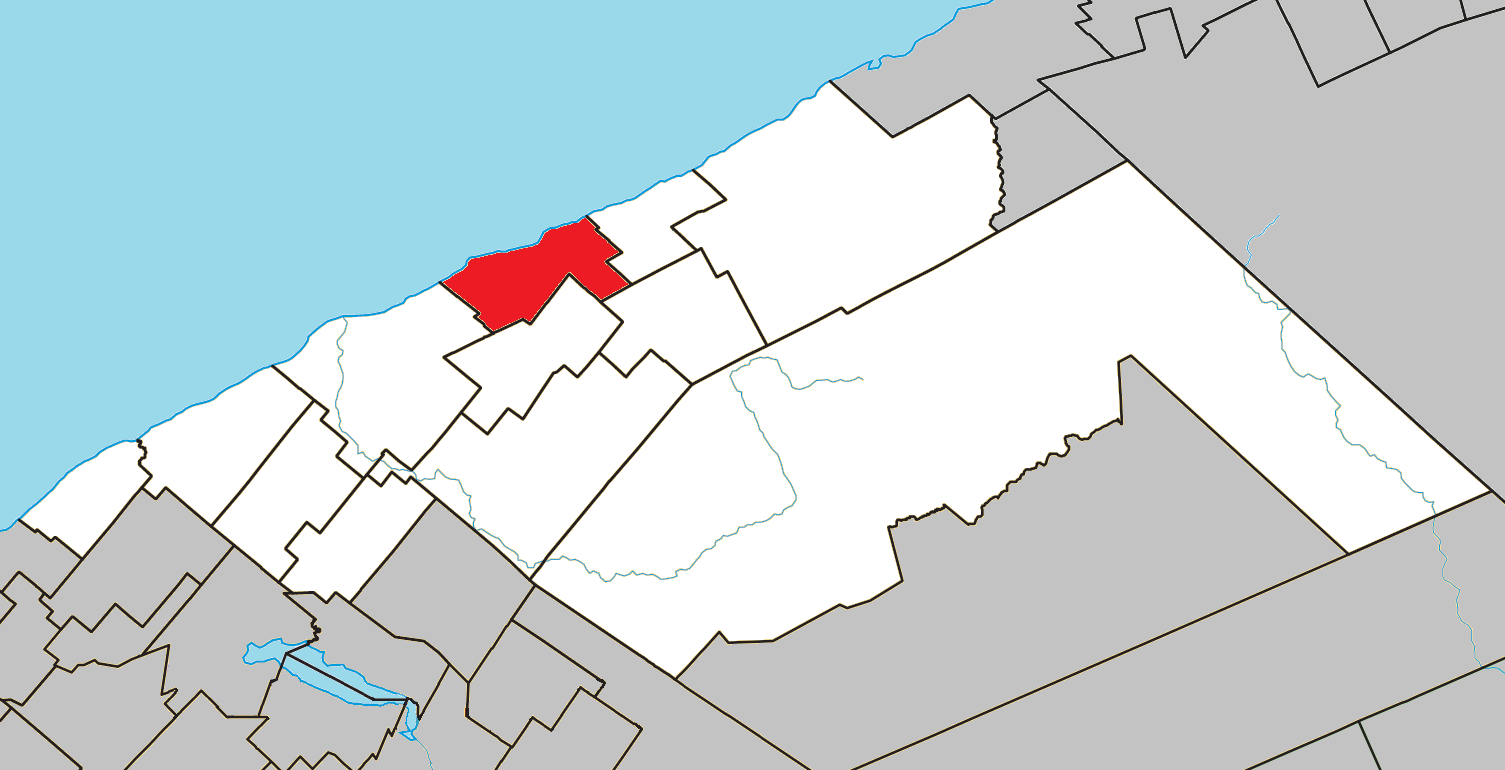
- Location within La Matanie RCM

- Location in eastern Quebec
- Coordinates: 48°54′N 67°20′W
- Country: Canada
- Province: Quebec
- Region: Bas-Saint-Laurent
- RCM: La Matanie
- Settled: mid 19th century
- Constituted: January 10, 1996

Government
  - Mayor: Réginald Desrosiers
  - Federal riding: Gaspésie—Les Îles-de-la-Madeleine—Listuguj
  - Prov. riding: Matane-Matapédia-Mitis

Area
  - Total: 91.51 km^{2} (35.33 sq mi)
  - Land: 90.73 km^{2} (35.03 sq mi)

Population (2021)
  - Total: 1,100
  - Density: 12.1/km^{2} (31/sq mi)
  - Pop (2016–21): ▲1.2%
  - Dwellings: 580
- Demonym(s): Félicitois, Félicitoise
- Time zone: UTC−05:00 (EST)
  - Summer (DST): UTC−04:00 (EDT)
- Postal code(s): G0J 2K0
- Area codes: 418 and 581
- Highways: R-132
- Website: saintefelicite.ca

Sainte-Félicité (French pronunciation: [sɛ̃t felisite]) is a municipality in La Matanie Regional County Municipality of Quebec, Canada, located on the south shore of the St. Lawrence River. It is named after saint Felicitas of Rome, a Christian martyr. Its economy is based on fishing and agriculture.

Notable people who came from Sainte-Félicité include Québécois pop singer Isabelle Boulay, who was born there in 1972.

In addition to Sainte-Félicité itself, the municipality also includes the communities of Cap-à-la-Baleine, L'Anse-à-la-Croix, Le Grand-Deuxième, Le Petit-Deuxième, and Sainte-Félicité-Ouest.

== History ==
According to recent studies, Cap à la Baleine (Cape Whale) was how far Jacques Cartier sailed up the St. Lawrence in 1534. It was also an area with many shipwrecks, earning it the name Pointe-au-Massacre (Massacre Point), sometimes pluralized as Pointe-aux-Massacres. While Saint-Denis, the name of the geographic township, was used concurrently, the macabre name remained in use until the mid 19th century and was the inspiration for the current name, because Bishop Charles-François Baillargeon wrote "je change le Massacre en Félicité" ("I change the massacre to happiness") in 1860.

In 1857, a mission was established. In 1864, the post office opened under the name Sainte-Félicité. In 1866, the place was incorporated as the Township Municipality of Saint-Denis, but two years later changed its name and status to Parish Municipality of Sainte-Félicité.

In 1955, the main settlement separated from the parish municipality and was incorporated as the Village Municipality of Sainte-Félicité.

On January 10, 1996, the current Municipality of Sainte-Félicité was formed when the Village Municipality and Parish Municipality were rejoined together again.

== Demographics ==
=== Population ===
Canada census – Sainte-Félicité community profile

	2021	2016	2011
Population	1,100 (+1.2% from 2016)	1,087 (-7.5% from 2011)	1,175 (-2.2% from 2006)
Land area	90.73 km^{2} (35.03 sq mi)	91.38 km^{2} (35.28 sq mi)	91.35 km^{2} (35.27 sq mi)
Population density	12.1/km^{2} (31/sq mi)	11.9/km^{2} (31/sq mi)	8.3/km^{2} (21/sq mi)
Median age	52.4 (M: 51.6, F: 53.6)	54.0 (M: 53.3, F: 55.1)	49.7 (M: 49.2, F: 50.2)
Private dwellings	580 (total) 505 (occupied)	614 (total) 507 (occupied)	625 (total)
Median household income	$57,200	$43,456	$42,819

Notes: 2016 Data based on population and dwelling count amendments.
References: 2021 2016 2011

Historical census data - Sainte-Félicité, Bas-Saint-Laurent
Year	Pop.	±%
2001	1,256	—
2006	1,201	−4.4%
2011	1,175	−2.2%
2016	1,087	−7.5%
2021	1,100	+1.2%
2016 Population based on revised count. Source: Statistics Canada

=== Language ===
Canada Census mother tongue - Sainte-Félicité, Quebec
Census	Total	French			English			French & English			Other		
Year	Responses	Count	Trend	Pop %	Count	Trend	Pop %	Count	Trend	Pop %	Count	Trend	Pop %
2021	1,080	1,065	▲0.5%	98.6%	0	▼100.0%	0.0%	0	0.0%	0.0%	10	▲ n/a%	0.9%
2016	1,065	1,060	▼9.0%	99.5%	5	0.0%	0.5%	0	0.0%	0.0%	0	0.0%	0.0%
2011	1,175	1,165	▼0.9%	99.1%	5	▲ n/a%	0.4%	0	0.0%	0.0%	0	▼100.0%	0.0%
2006	1,200	1,175	▼2.1%	97.9%	0	0.0%	0.0%	0	0.0%	0.0%	20	▲100.0%	1.7%
2001	1,205	1,200	n/a	99.6%	0	n/a	0.0%	0	n/a	0.0%	10	n/a	0.8%

== See also ==
- List of municipalities in Quebec
