= Saint-Jean-de-Cherbourg =

- Parish municipality
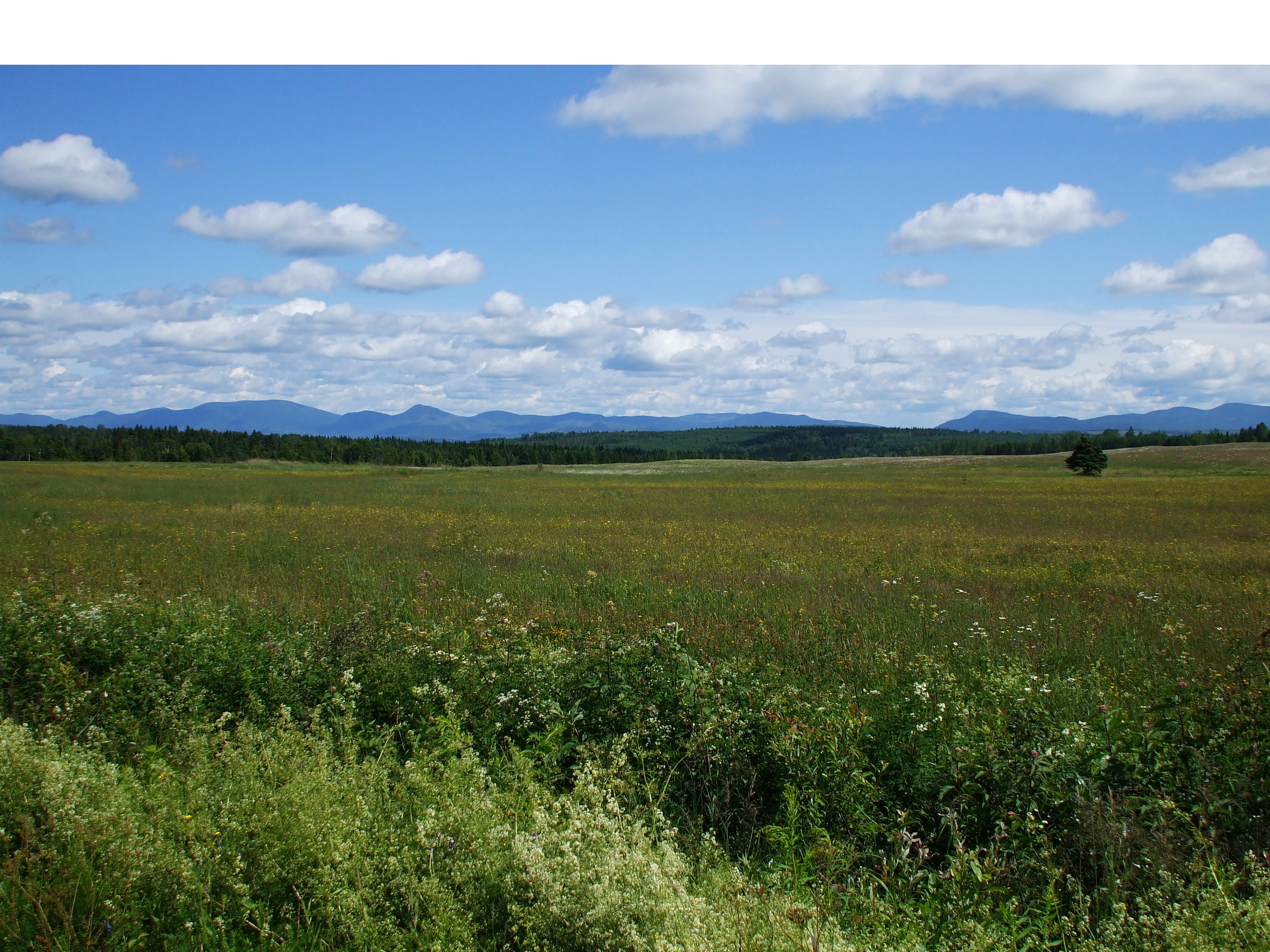
- Motto: S'unir pour progresser
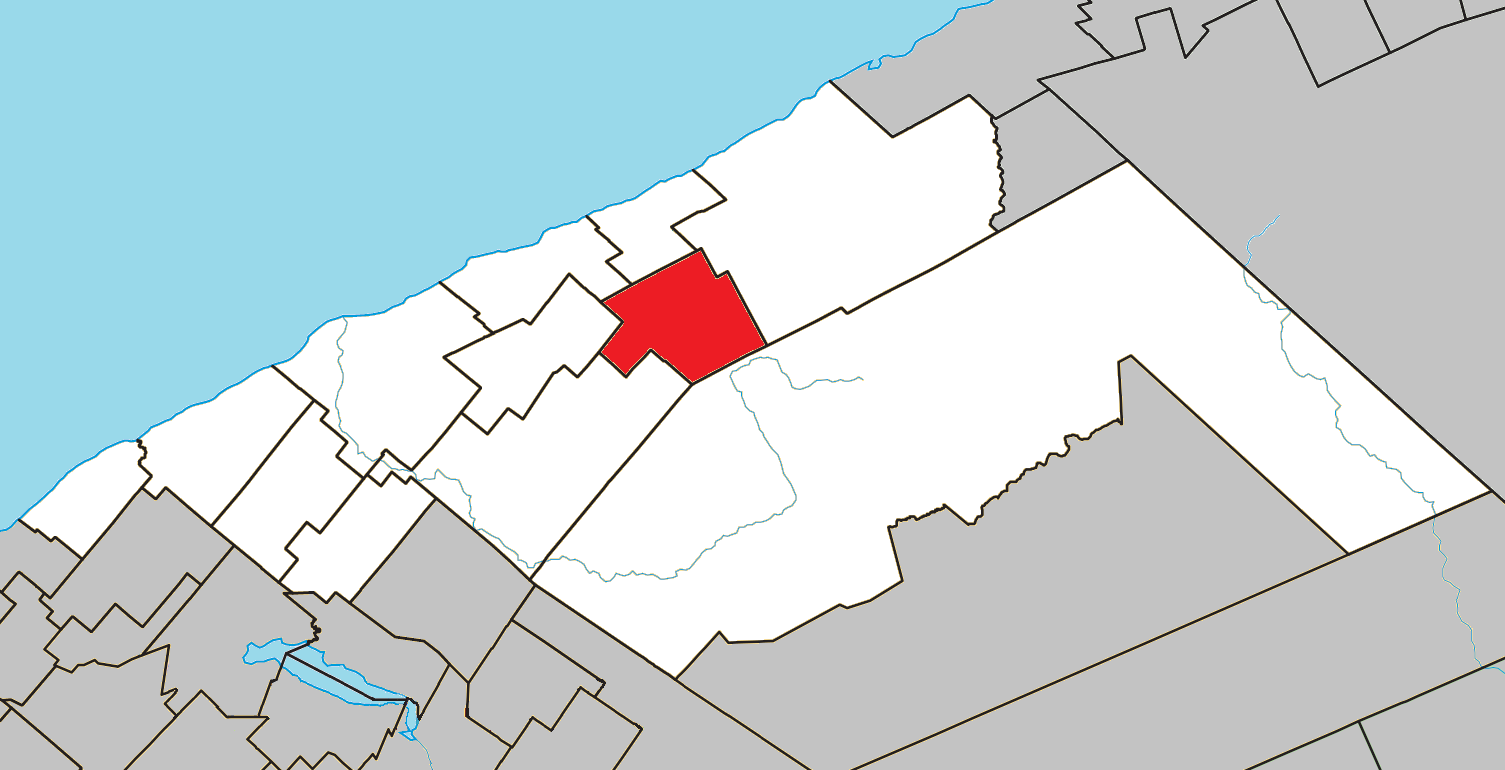
- Location within La Matanie RCM

- Location in eastern Quebec
- Coordinates: 48°51′N 67°07′W
- Country: Canada
- Province: Quebec
- Region: Bas-Saint-Laurent
- RCM: La Matanie
- Settled: 1930
- Constituted: May 1, 1954

Government
  - Mayor: Mathieu St-Pierre Boulay
  - Fed. riding: Gaspésie—Les Îles-de-la-Madeleine—Listuguj
  - Prov. riding: Matane-Matapédia-Mitis

Area
  - Total: 113.93 km^{2} (43.99 sq mi)
  - Land: 113.96 km^{2} (44.00 sq mi)
- There is an apparent discrepancy between two authoritative sources.

Population (2021)
  - Total: 163
  - Density: 1.4/km^{2} (3.6/sq mi)
  - Change (2016-21): ▼1.2%
  - Dwellings: 93
- Time zone: UTC−5 (EST)
  - Summer (DST): UTC−4 (EDT)
- Postal code(s): G0J 2R0
- Area codes: 418, 581
- Highways: No major routes
- Website: www.st-jeandecherbourg.ca

Saint-Jean-de-Cherbourg (French pronunciation: [sɛ̃ ʒɑ̃ də ʃɛʁbuʁ]) is a parish municipality in the Canadian province of Quebec, located in La Matanie Regional County Municipality.

== Geography ==
=== Climate ===
Climate data for Saint-Jean-de-Cherbourg, Quebec (1981-2010): 352m
| Month | Jan | Feb | Mar | Apr | May | Jun | Jul | Aug | Sep | Oct | Nov | Dec | Year |
|---|---|---|---|---|---|---|---|---|---|---|---|---|---|
| Record high °C (°F) | 10.5 (50.9) | 9.5 (49.1) | 15.5 (59.9) | 26.5 (79.7) | 29.5 (85.1) | 33.0 (91.4) | 33.5 (92.3) | 31.5 (88.7) | 29.5 (85.1) | 25.0 (77.0) | 19.0 (66.2) | 11.1 (52.0) | 33.5 (92.3) |
| Mean daily maximum °C (°F) | −9.5 (14.9) | −7.7 (18.1) | −1.9 (28.6) | 4.8 (40.6) | 12.8 (55.0) | 18.6 (65.5) | 21.2 (70.2) | 20.0 (68.0) | 15.0 (59.0) | 7.9 (46.2) | 0.7 (33.3) | −5.7 (21.7) | 6.4 (43.4) |
| Daily mean °C (°F) | −14.0 (6.8) | −12.3 (9.9) | −6.6 (20.1) | 0.6 (33.1) | 7.7 (45.9) | 13.3 (55.9) | 16.3 (61.3) | 15.2 (59.4) | 10.4 (50.7) | 4.1 (39.4) | −2.4 (27.7) | −9.4 (15.1) | 1.9 (35.4) |
| Mean daily minimum °C (°F) | −18.4 (−1.1) | −17.0 (1.4) | −11.3 (11.7) | −3.7 (25.3) | 2.6 (36.7) | 8.1 (46.6) | 11.4 (52.5) | 10.3 (50.5) | 5.8 (42.4) | 0.4 (32.7) | −5.6 (21.9) | −13.1 (8.4) | −2.5 (27.4) |
| Record low °C (°F) | −40.0 (−40.0) | −39.4 (−38.9) | −35.6 (−32.1) | −23.3 (−9.9) | −13.3 (8.1) | −5.6 (21.9) | −2.2 (28.0) | −3.3 (26.1) | −7.8 (18.0) | −15.6 (3.9) | −22.2 (−8.0) | −38.9 (−38.0) | −40.0 (−40.0) |
| Average precipitation mm (inches) | 91.2 (3.59) | 68.8 (2.71) | 75.8 (2.98) | 69.3 (2.73) | 89.7 (3.53) | 106.3 (4.19) | 112.6 (4.43) | 100.5 (3.96) | 108.0 (4.25) | 104.8 (4.13) | 104.1 (4.10) | 107.2 (4.22) | 1,138.3 (44.82) |
| Average snowfall cm (inches) | 81.0 (31.9) | 62.9 (24.8) | 65.3 (25.7) | 38.3 (15.1) | 4.8 (1.9) | 0.0 (0.0) | 0.0 (0.0) | 0.0 (0.0) | 0.0 (0.0) | 11.7 (4.6) | 56.3 (22.2) | 95.0 (37.4) | 415.3 (163.6) |
| Average precipitation days (≥ 0.2 mm) | 15.9 | 13.9 | 12.5 | 12.2 | 15.0 | 14.0 | 15.3 | 14.6 | 15.2 | 17.0 | 15.5 | 17.6 | 178.7 |
| Average snowy days (≥ 0.2 cm) | 15.1 | 13.0 | 11.1 | 6.2 | 1.0 | 0.0 | 0.0 | 0.0 | 0.0 | 2.1 | 9.5 | 16.1 | 74.1 |
Source: Environment Canada

== Demographics ==
In the 2021 Census of Population conducted by Statistics Canada, Saint-Jean-de-Cherbourg had a population of 163 living in 73 of its 93 total private dwellings, a change of −1.2% from its 2016 population of 165. With a land area of 113.96 km^{2} (44.00 sq mi), it had a population density of 1.4/km^{2} (3.7/sq mi) in 2021.

Canada census – Saint-Jean-de-Cherbourg community profile

| | 2021 | 2016 | 2011 |
| Population | 163 (-1.2% from 2016) | 165 (−14.5% from 2011) | 193 (−11.5% from 2006) |
| Land area | 113.96 km^{2} (44.00 sq mi) | 114.05 km^{2} (44.03 sq mi) | 114.05 km^{2} (44.03 sq mi) |
| Population density | 1.4/km^{2} (3.6/sq mi) | 1.4/km^{2} (3.6/sq mi) | 1.7/km^{2} (4.4/sq mi) |
| Median age | 56.0 (M: 59.2, F: 53.6) | 57.0 (M: 57.2, F: 56.5) | 51.4 (M: 52.8, F: 46.9) |
| Private dwellings | 93 (total) 73 (occupied) | 130 (total) 73 (occupied) | 109 (total) |
| Median household income | $.N/A | $46,464 | $.N/A |

Notes: Income data suppressed to meet the confidentiality requirements of the Statistics Act.
2016 Data based on population and dwelling count amendments.
References: 2021 2016 2011

Historical census populations – Saint-Jean-de-Cherbourg

| Year | Pop. | ±% |
|---|---|---|
| 1956 | 1,167 | — |
| 1961 | 909 | −22.1% |
| 1966 | 629 | −30.8% |
| 1971 | 471 | −25.1% |
| 1976 | 252 | −46.5% |
| 1981 | 227 | −9.9% |
| 1986 | 219 | −3.5% |

| Year | Pop. | ±% |
|---|---|---|
| 1991 | 230 | +5.0% |
| 1996 | 239 | +3.9% |
| 2001 | 201 | −15.9% |
| 2006 | 218 | +8.5% |
| 2011 | 193 | −11.5% |
| 2016 | 165 | −14.5% |
| 2021 | 163 | −1.2% |

2016 Population figure based on revised counts.
Source: Statistics Canada

Mother tongue:

- English as first language: 0%
- French as first language: 100.0%
- English and French as first languages: 0%
- Other as first language: 0%

== See also ==
- List of parish municipalities in Quebec
