= La Matanie Regional County Municipality =

La Matanie
- Regional county municipality
- Coordinates: 48°51′N 67°17′W
- Country: Canada
- Province: Quebec
- Region: Bas-Saint-Laurent
- Effective: January 1, 1982
- County seat: Matane

Government
  - Type: Prefecture
  - Prefect: Gérald Beaulieu

Area
  - Total: 3,410.88 km^{2} (1,316.95 sq mi)
  - Land: 3,315.74 km^{2} (1,280.21 sq mi)

Population (2021)
  - Total: 20,883
  - Density: 6.3/km^{2} (16/sq mi)
  - Change (2016-21): ▼2.0%
  - Dwellings: 11,728
- Time zone: UTC−5 (EST)
  - Summer (DST): UTC−4 (EDT)
- Area codes: 418 and 581

La Matanie (French pronunciation: [la matani]) is a regional county municipality, located in the Bas-Saint-Laurent region of Quebec, in Canada. From January 1, 1982, to March 9, 2013, it was known as Matane.

The county seat is the city of Matane.

== Subdivisions ==
There are 12 subdivisions within the RCM:

Cities & towns (1)

- Matane

Municipalities (7)

- Baie-des-Sables
- Grosses-Roches
- Les Méchins
- Sainte-Félicité
- Sainte-Paule
- Saint-René-de-Matane
- Saint-Ulric

Parishes (3)

- Saint-Adelme
- Saint-Jean-de-Cherbourg
- Saint-Léandre

Unorganized territory (1)

- Rivière-Bonjour

== Demographics ==
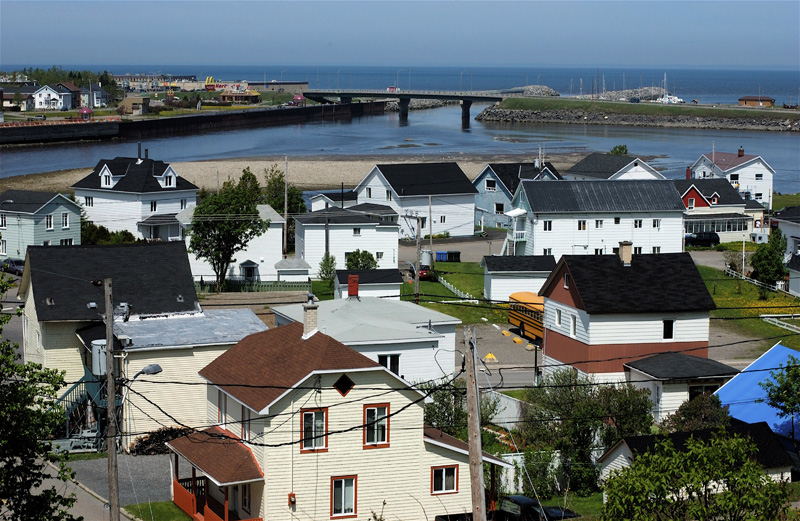
Matane

=== Population ===
Canada census – La Matanie community profile

	2021	2016	2011
Population	20,883 (-2.0% from 2016)	21,301 (-2.2% from 2011)	21,786 (-2.1% from 2006)
Land area	3,315.74 km^{2} (1,280.21 sq mi)	3,318.34 km^{2} (1,281.22 sq mi)	3,319.08 km^{2} (1,281.50 sq mi)
Population density	6.3/km^{2} (16/sq mi)	6.4/km^{2} (17/sq mi)	6.6/km^{2} (17/sq mi)
Median age	54.0 (M: 52.8, F: 54.8)	52.8 (M: 52.0, F: 53.5)	50.0 (M: 49.2, F: 50.7)
Private dwellings	11,728 (total) 10,387 (occupied)	11,948 (total)	11,656 (total)
Median household income	$56,400	$47,821	$42,212

References: 2021 2016 2011

Historical census data - La Matanie Regional County Municipality, Quebec

Year	Pop.	±%
1991	24,334	—
1996	23,723	−2.5%
2001	22,507	−5.1%
2006	22,247	−1.2%

Year	Pop.	±%
2011	21,786	−2.1%
2016	21,301	−2.2%
2021	20,883	−2.0%

Source: Statistics Canada

=== Language ===
Canada Census mother tongue - La Matanie Regional County Municipality, Quebec
Census	Total	French			English			French & English			Other		
Year	Responses	Count	Trend	Pop %	Count	Trend	Pop %	Count	Trend	Pop %	Count	Trend	Pop %
2016	21,040	20,800	▼2.8%	98.86%	95	0.0%	0.45%	60	▼14.3%	0.29%	85	▲21.4%	0.40%
2011	21,640	21,405	▼0.6%	98.91%	95	▼24.0%	0.44%	70	▲50.0%	0.32%	70	▼64.1%	0.32%
2006	21,880	21,525	▼1.7%	98.38%	125	▲92.3%	0.57%	35	▼36.4%	0.16%	195	▲333.3%	0.89%
2001	22,065	21,900	▼5.5%	99.25%	65	▼43.5%	0.29%	55	▲37.5%	0.25%	45	▲80.0%	0.20%
1996	23,355	23,175	n/a	99.23%	115	n/a	0.49%	40	n/a	0.17%	25	n/a	0.11%

== Transportation ==
=== Access routes ===
Highways and numbered routes that run through the municipality, including external routes that start or finish at the county border:

- Autoroutes
  - None
- Principal highways
  - R-132
  - R-195
- Secondary highways
  - R-299
- External routes
  - None

== Notable people ==
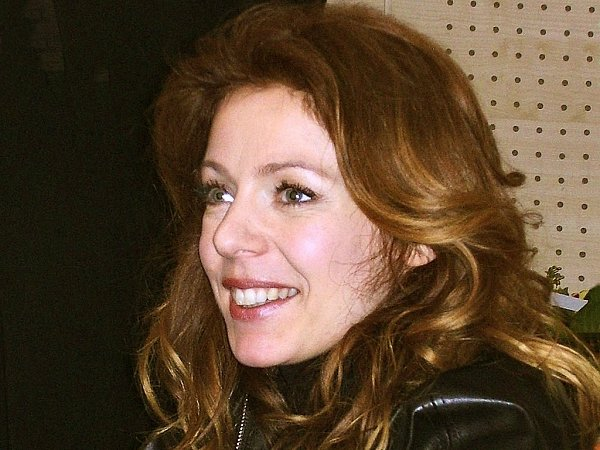
Isabelle Boulay

- Isabelle Boulay, born at Sainte-Félicité
- Alain Côté, born in 1957 at Matane

== See also ==
- List of regional county municipalities and equivalent territories in Quebec
