= List of historic places in Bas-Saint-Laurent =

This article is a list of historic places in Bas-Saint-Laurent, entered on the Canadian Register of Historic Places, whether they are federal, provincial, or municipal. All addresses are the administrative Region 01. For all other listings in the province of Quebec, see List of historic places in Quebec.

Name	Address	Coordinates	Government recognition (CRHP №)	Wikidata ID	Image
Wreck of RMS Empress of Ireland National Historic Site of Canada	In the Saint Lawrence River; Pointe-au-Pere QC	48°37′30″N 68°24′30″W	Federal (15164), Quebec (9892)		More images
Light Station: Fog Alarm	Bicquette Island / Ile-Bicquette; QC	48°24′09″N 68°52′27″W	Federal (11037)		
Lighthouse	Bicquette Island / Ile-Bicquette; QC	48°24′55″N 68°53′34″W	Federal (10474)		
Ancien presbytère	30, Rue Bouillon; Lac-au-Saumon QC	48°25′12″N 67°20′39″W	Quebec (15122)		Upload Photo
Tertre funéraire de John-Frederick-Darwall	Route Saint-Edmond; Lac-au-Saumon QC	48°24′33″N 67°18′26″W	Quebec (15187)		Upload Photo
Girard House	371 Route 132; L'Isle-Verte QC	48°01′47″N 69°19′20″W	Federal (11410)		
Îlot religieux de L'Isle-Verte	Rue Saint-Jean-Baptiste; L'Isle-Verte QC	48°00′54″N 69°20′18″W	Quebec (16201)		
Vieux théâtre de Saint-Fabien	112, 1e Rue; Saint-Fabien QC	48°17′45″N 68°52′00″W	Quebec (16202)		
Chapelle de Notre-Dame-des-Murailles	38, Chemin de la Mer Ouest; Saint-Fabien QC	48°18′55″N 68°52′22″W	Quebec (16203)		
Place de l'église de Sainte-Hélène	Rue du Couvent; Sainte-Helene QC	47°35′23″N 69°43′48″W	Quebec (15155)		
Fog Alarm Building	between the river and the access road to the Pointe-au-Père Lighthouse; Pointe-au-Pere QC	48°30′59″N 68°28′01″W	Federal (11346)		More images
Presbytère de Saint-Jérôme-de-Matane	527, Avenue Saint-Jerome; Matane QC	48°50′56″N 67°31′51″W	Quebec (9645)		More images
Maison Horace-Bouffard	961, Rang des Bouffard; Matane QC	48°51′08″N 67°25′01″W	Quebec (12452)		More images
Site du patrimoine religieux de Saint-Bartholomew	Rue du Domaine; Rivière-du-Loup QC	47°50′24″N 69°32′14″W	Quebec (15462)		More images
Site du patrimoine religieux de la chapelle Sainte-Anne-des-Ondes	116, Rue Hayward; Rivière-du-Loup QC	47°51′13″N 69°33′34″W	Quebec (15602)		Upload Photo
Site du patrimoine religieux de la paroisse de Saint-François-Xavier	Rue Delage; Rivière-du-Loup QC	47°49′29″N 69°31′52″W	Quebec (15604)		More images
Site du patrimoine religieux de la paroisse de Saint-Ludger	Rue Alexandre; Rivière-du-Loup QC	47°49′38″N 69°31′24″W	Quebec (15605)		
Site du patrimoine religieux de la paroisse de Saint-Patrice	Rue Lafontaine; Rivière-du-Loup QC	47°50′16″N 69°32′16″W	Quebec (15485)		More images
Saint-André-de-Kamouraska Church National Historic Site of Canada	128 Main Street; Saint-André-de-Kamouraska QC	47°41′00″N 69°44′00″W	Federal (7840)		
Jardins de Métis National Historic Site of Canada	200 Highway 132; Grand-Métis QC	48°37′51″N 68°07′48″W	Federal (1283)		
Site de pêche Matamajaw	Route 132; Causapscal QC	48°21′08″N 67°13′20″W	Quebec (1753)		More images
Ancien presbytère de Sainte-Flavie	505, Route de la Mer; Sainte-Flavie QC	48°36′40″N 68°13′46″W	Sainte-Flavie municipality (8248)		More images
Gare de Sayabec	11, Route 132 Ouest; Sayabec QC	48°33′58″N 67°41′22″W	Sayabec municipality (8250)		More images
Mausolée du Curé-Alexandre-Bouillon	Rue de l'Oratoire; Lac-au-Saumon QC	48°25′26″N 67°20′56″W	Lac-au-Saumon municipality (8302)		Upload Photo
Maison du Docteur-Joseph-Frenette	3, Rue Frenette; Causapscal QC	48°21′13″N 67°13′16″W	Causapscal municipality (8336)		Upload Photo
Grange-étable Marcheterre	4e Rang Ouest; Métis-sur-Mer QC	48°39′57″N 67°54′46″W	Métis-sur-Mer municipality (8603)		Upload Photo
Caserne de pompiers	24, Rue Bouillon; Lac-au-Saumon QC	48°25′15″N 67°20′38″W	Lac-au-Saumon municipality (8644)		Upload Photo
Ancien presbytère de Saint-Laurent	3, Rue du Carillon; Matapédia QC	47°58′30″N 66°57′12″W	Matapédia municipality (10161)		
Oratoire Saint-Joseph	31, Rue de l'Oratoire; Lac-au-Saumon QC	48°25′23″N 67°21′03″W	Lac-au-Saumon municipality (11063)		
Maison Bourgoin	21, Rue Saint-Remi; Price QC	48°36′10″N 68°07′34″W	Price municipality (11064)		
Site du patrimoine Flavie-Drapeau	Route de la Mer; Sainte-Flavie QC	48°36′41″N 68°13′45″W	Sainte-Flavie municipality (11065)		More images
Grange à dîme de Sainte-Florence	26, Rue Beaurivage Nord; Sainte-Florence QC	48°15′56″N 67°14′29″W	Sainte-Florence municipality (13137)		Upload Photo
Pont de Routhierville	Chemin du Rang-A; Routhierville QC	48°10′56″N 67°08′55″W	Quebec (14043)		More images
Maison Côté	652, rang 3 Ouest; Saint-Anaclet-de-Lessard QC	48°27′09″N 68°27′05″W	Quebec (1689)		
Ancien presbytère d'Esprit-Saint	1, Rue des Erables; Esprit-Saint QC	48°04′02″N 68°33′48″W	Esprit-Saint municipality (7898)		Upload Photo
Église de Sainte-Luce	Route du Fleuve Ouest; Sainte-Luce QC	48°33′01″N 68°23′00″W	Quebec (8107)		
Presbytère de Saint-Anaclet-de-Lessard	25, Rue Principale Est; Saint-Anaclet-de-Lessard QC	48°28′41″N 68°25′20″W	Saint-Anaclet-de-Lessard municipality (8300)		
Site de l'église et du cimetière de Sainte-Luce	Route du Fleuve Ouest; Sainte-Luce QC	48°33′01″N 68°23′00″W	Quebec (8705)		More images
Église de Saint-Anaclet-de-Lessard	Rue Principale Est; Saint-Anaclet-de-Lessard QC	48°28′38″N 68°25′22″W	Saint-Anaclet-de-Lessard municipality (11340)		
Forge Saint-Laurent	78, Rue Principale Ouest; Saint-Anaclet-de-Lessard QC	48°28′33″N 68°25′32″W	Saint-Anaclet-de-Lessard municipality (12005)		
Ancien presbytère de Rivière-Ouelle	100 rue de l'Eglise; Rivière-Ouelle QC	47°26′00″N 70°00′55″W	Quebec (1688)		More images
Moulin du Petit-Sault	Route 132; L'Isle-Verte QC	48°03′28″N 69°17′22″W	Quebec (1729)		More images
Maison Louis-Bertrand	168, rue Saint-Jean-Baptiste; L'Isle-Verte QC	48°00′49″N 69°20′16″W	Federal (9619), Quebec (1743)		More images
Édifice de la Cour-de-Circuit-de-L'Isle-Verte	199, rue Saint-Jean Baptiste; L'Isle-Verte QC	48°00′42″N 69°20′20″W	Quebec (4239)		
Presbytère de Saint-Hubert	1, chemin Tache Ouest; Saint-Hubert-de-Rivière-du-Loup QC	47°48′51″N 69°08′56″W	Quebec (4465)		More images
Quais de Kamouraska	Avenue Leblanc; Kamouraska QC	47°33′46″N 69°52′27″W	Kamouraska municipality (5953)		More images
Presbytère de Kamouraska	76, rue Morel; Kamouraska QC	47°34′00″N 69°52′06″W	Kamouraska municipality (5956)		More images
Site du Berceau-de-Kamouraska	route 132 (Kamouraska); Kamouraska QC	47°34′42″N 69°49′58″W	Kamouraska municipality (5958)		More images
Noyau institutionnel de Kamouraska	avenue Morel; Kamouraska QC	47°34′00″N 69°52′12″W	Kamouraska municipality (6001)		More images
Moulin Casgrain-Lévesque	199, boulevard Begin; Saint-Pacôme QC	47°24′25″N 69°57′07″W	Saint-Pacôme municipality (6212)		Upload Photo
Brandy Pot Island Lighthouse	Brandy Pot Island; Saint-André-de-Kamouraska QC	47°52′21″N 69°40′51″W	Federal (14281, (20715)		
Site du patrimoine des villas King et Harding et du cimetière familial King et Harding	Saint-Pacôme QC	47°24′09″N 69°57′31″W	Quebec (15741)		Upload Photo
Ancien palais de justice de Kamouraska	111, avenue Morel; Kamouraska QC	47°33′44″N 69°52′17″W	Kamouraska municipality (6216)		More images
Pont Romain-Caron	Over the Jerry River; Saint-Jean-de-la-Lande QC	47°23′43″N 68°43′13″W	Saint-Jean-de-la-Lande municipality (6252)		More images
Maison du notaire	168, rue Notre-Dame Est; Trois-Pistoles QC	48°07′39″N 69°10′14″W	Trois-Pistoles municipality (6358)		More images
Église de Saint-André	128, rue Principale; Saint-André-de-Kamouraska QC	47°40′25″N 69°43′44″W	Quebec (7036)		
Église de Saint-Georges	rue de l'Eglise; Saint-Georges-de-Cacouna QC	47°54′58″N 69°29′57″W	Quebec (7314)		More images
Grange Adolphe-Gagnon	129-A, Rue du Parc; Saint-Fabien QC	48°17′52″N 68°51′58″W	Quebec (7680)		More images
Presbytère de Saint-Cyprien	187, Rue Principale; Saint-Cyprien QC	47°53′41″N 69°01′03″W	Saint-Cyprien municipality (7713)		More images
Maison des Ouellet	395, route 230 Ouest; Sainte-Hélène QC	47°37′26″N 69°40′56″W	Sainte-Hélène municipality (7895)		Upload Photo
Site du patrimoine du Moulin-Paradis	Chemin du Moulin-Paradis; Kamouraska QC	47°32′59″N 69°50′43″W	Kamouraska municipality (7971)		More images
Salle des loisirs de Sainte-Françoise	25, Rue Principale; Sainte-Françoise QC	48°05′39″N 69°03′46″W	Sainte-Françoise municipality (9138)		
Site du patrimoine du Noyau-Religieux-de-Notre-Dame-du-Portage	Route du Fleuve, between the road and the river Notre-Dame-du-Portage QC	47°46′06″N 69°36′37″W	Notre-Dame-du-Portage municipality (10176)		More images
Ancien magasin général Norbert-Dionne	104, Rue Galarneau; Saint-Pacome QC	47°24′35″N 69°56′52″W	Saint-Pacome municipality (10237)		
Domaine de la Seigneurie de l'Islet-du-Portage	94, Route 132; Saint-Germain-de-Kamouraska QC	47°37′26″N 69°46′22″W	Saint-Germain-de-Kamouraska municipality (10292)		
Petite École Delisle	214, Route 132; Rivière-Ouelle QC	47°27′06″N 70°00′05″W	Rivière-Ouelle municipality (10640)		
Chapelle du Lac-de-l'Est	301, Rue des Trembles; Mont-Carmel QC	47°13′57″N 69°34′48″W	Mont-Carmel municipality (10999)		Upload Photo
Site de la maison Narcisse-Bertrand	42, Rue du Verger; L'Isle-Verte QC	48°00′24″N 69°20′36″W	L'Isle-Verte municipality (11150)		
Presbytère de Saint-Philippe-de-Néri	11, Cote de l'Eglise; Saint-Philippe-de-Néri QC	47°27′59″N 69°53′06″W	Saint-Philippe-de-Néri municipality (11153)		Upload Photo
Site du patrimoine du Moulin-Lavoie	Route 230 Ouest; Saint-Pascal QC	47°30′46″N 69°49′54″W	Saint-Pascal municipality (11335)		Upload Photo
Gare de Cabano	5, Rue de la Gare; Cabano QC	47°41′05″N 68°53′18″W	Cabano municipality (11458)		
Fort Ingall	81, Rue Caldwell; Cabano QC	47°41′28″N 68°54′04″W	Quebec (11987)		More images
Manoir Rioux-Belzile	18, Chemin de la Greve-Rioux; Notre-Dame-des-Neiges QC	48°07′21″N 69°12′06″W	Notre-Dame-des-Neiges municipality (11993)		Upload Photo
Chapais House National Historic Site of Canada	2 Highway 132 east Saint-Denis-De La Bouteillerie QC	47°30′11″N 69°56′16″W	Federal (12285), Quebec (1691)		
Île-Verte Lighthouse National Historic Site of Canada	Off Chemin du Phare, L'Isle-Verte; Notre-Dame-des-Sept-Douleurs QC	48°03′04″N 69°25′27″W	Federal (3675, (20841), Quebec (12287), Notre-Dame-des-Sept-Douleurs municipality (10559)		
Maison hantée	Off Route 132; Notre-Dame-des-Neiges QC	48°05′11″N 69°15′15″W	Notre-Dame-des-Neiges municipality (12370)		Upload Photo
Site du patrimoine de la Place-de-l'Église	Rue de l'Eglise; Saint-Bruno-de-Kamouraska QC	47°27′25″N 69°45′15″W	Saint-Bruno-de-Kamouraska municipality (12978)		Upload Photo
Presbytère de Notre-Dame-des-Sept-Douleurs	629, Chemin de l'Ile; Notre-Dame-des-Sept-Douleurs QC	48°01′13″N 69°26′08″W	Notre-Dame-des-Sept-Douleurs municipality (13270)		Upload Photo
L'Isle-Verte Court House National Historic Site of Canada	199 Saint-Jean-Baptiste Street; L'Isle-Verte QC	48°00′45″N 69°20′20″W	Federal (14128)		
Site du patrimoine du Noyau-Religieux-de-Saint-Joseph-de-Kamouraska	Rue Principale Est; Saint-Joseph-de-Kamouraska QC	47°36′39″N 69°38′28″W	Saint-Joseph-de-Kamouraska municipality (14580)		
Site du patrimoine du noyau paroissial de Saint-André	The central heart of Saint-André; Saint-André-de-Kamouraska QC	47°40′28″N 69°43′44″W	Saint-André-de-Kamouraska municipality (14588)		More images
Gare de Rivière-Blanche	1049, boulevard Gaboury; Mont-Joli QC	48°35′42″N 68°12′16″W	Quebec (1678)		More images
Château Landry	1588, Boulevard Jacques-Cartier; Mont-Joli QC	48°35′10″N 68°11′18″W	Quebec (9382)		More images
Maison Odilon-Vallée	154, Boulevard Saint-Benoit Ouest; Amqui QC	48°27′57″N 67°26′05″W	Quebec (8494)		Upload Photo
Maison Joseph-Gauvreau	7, rue de l'Evêché Ouest; Rimouski QC	48°26′55″N 68°31′26″W	Quebec (1416)		More images
Maison Lamontagne	707, boulevard du Rivage; Rimouski QC	48°29′03″N 68°29′42″W	Quebec (1736)		More images
Maison Pierre-Louis-Gauvreau	150, Rue Saint-Pierre; Rimouski QC	48°27′12″N 68°31′12″W	Quebec (8602)		
Maison Letendre	86, Rue de l'Evêché Est; Rimouski QC	48°27′05″N 68°31′17″W	Quebec (8703)		
Site du secteur institutionnel au centre-ville	roughly between boulevard René-Lepage and rues Saint-Louis and de l'Évêché; Rimouski QC	48°27′04″N 68°31′40″W	Quebec (11027)		
Site de la rue Saint-Germain-Ouest	a region consisting of the rue Saint-Germain bounded by rues Sainte-Marie, Lavoie et Saint-Germain and boulevard de la Rivière; Rimouski QC	48°26′44″N 68°32′11″W	Quebec (11028)		Upload Photo
Site du patrimoine à l'intérieur du centre-ville de Rimouski	Roughly bounded by rues Saint-Germain Est, Jean-Brillant, de l'Évêché Est, and de la Cathédrale; Rimouski QC	48°27′05″N 68°31′17″W	Quebec (11029)		More images
Pointe-au-Père Lighthouse National Historic Site of Canada	1034 Lighthouse Road; Pointe-au-Pere QC	48°31′03″N 68°28′08″W	Federal (9912, (10876), Quebec (20839)		More images
Ancienne gare de Saint-Anaclet	Off Route 20 near Pointe-au-Père; Rimouski QC	48°29′38″N 68°26′51″W	Quebec (13183)		Upload Photo
Domaine seigneurial Fraser	32 rue Fraser; Rivière-du-Loup QC	47°50′29″N 69°32′19″W	Quebec (4090)		More images
Édifice de la Banque-de-Montréal	428, rue Lafontaine; Rivière-du-Loup QC	47°49′47″N 69°32′01″W	Quebec (4242)		More images
Site du patrimoine du Vieux-Saint-Patrice	Roughly bounded by the Saint Lawrence River, the northern border of Rivière-du-Loup, the autorote Jean-Lesage, and rue Fraser; Rivière-du-Loup QC	47°48′48″N 69°34′30″W	Quebec (8174)		
Maison Marquis	35, Rue de l'Hotel-de-Ville; Rivière-du-Loup QC	47°50′16″N 69°32′04″W	Quebec (8688)		More images
Maison Louis-Philippe-Lizotte	1, Rue Iberville; Rivière-du-Loup QC	47°50′23″N 69°32′13″W	Quebec (10238)		More images
Maison Ward	304, Rue Fraser; Rivière-du-Loup QC	47°48′54″N 69°34′16″W	Quebec (10279)		
Rivière-du-Loup Town Hall National Historic Site of Canada	189, Lafontaine Street; Rivière-du-Loup QC	47°50′09″N 69°32′12″W	Federal (12725)		More images
Canadian National Railways Station	209 Saint Benoit Blvd West; Amqui QC	48°27′59″N 67°26′09″W	Federal (4593)		
Île aux Basques National Historic Site of Canada	209 Saint Benoit Blvd West; Île aux Basques QC	48°08′26″N 69°15′08″W	Federal (17003)		
Armoury	374 St. Jerome Street; Matane QC	48°50′47″N 67°31′46″W	Federal (11006)		
Lighthouse	374 St. Jerome Street; Metis-sur-Mer QC	48°40′50″N 68°02′01″W	Federal (10441)		
Canadian National Railways Station	48 Station Road; Mont-Joli QC	48°35′20″N 68°11′21″W	Federal (4594)		
Armoury	65 Saint-Jean-Baptiste Street East; Rimouski QC	48°27′00″N 68°31′15″W	Federal (9831)		Upload Photo
Canadian National Railways Station	57 l'Eveche Road East; Rimouski QC	48°27′01″N 68°31′18″W	Federal (4595)		
Federal Building	180 de la Cathédrale Street; Rimouski QC	48°27′00″N 68°31′34″W	Federal (7526)		
Maison Roy	811 Boulevard Saint-Germain; Rimouski QC	48°25′45″N 68°35′18″W	Rimouski municipality (8600)		Upload Photo
Gare de Rivière-Bleue	85 Rue Saint-Joseph Nord; Rivière-Bleue QC	47°26′19″N 69°02′38″W	Rivière-Bleue municipality (8141)		
Armoury	Joly Street; Rivière-du-Loup QC	47°50′07″N 69°32′33″W	Federal (4752)		
Sir John A. Macdonald’s Summer Residence National Historic Site of Canada	336 Fraser Street; Rivière-du-Loup QC	47°48′46″N 69°34′30″W	Federal (20368)		
Pont du Collège	Route de l'Église; La Pocatière QC	47°17′34″N 69°57′08″W	La Pocatière municipality (7897)		Upload Photo
Canadian National Railway Station	536 Station Road; Saint-Pascal QC	47°31′33″N 69°48′05″W	Federal (6729)		Upload Photo
Canadian National Railways Station	95 Station Road; La Pocatière QC	47°21′50″N 70°01′20″W	Federal (4581)		
Canadian National Railway Station	11 Hwy. 132 West; Sayabec QC	48°33′59″N 67°41′17″W	Federal (6806)		
Lighthouse	Saint Lawrence River south of Tadoussac; Ile-Rouge QC	48°04′09″N 69°33′17″W	Federal (10437)		
