= Goudron River =

River in MRC Kamouraska in Quebec (Canada)

- Location within Quebec
- Native name: Rivière Goudron (French)

Location
- Country: Canada
- Province: Quebec
- Region: Bas-Saint-Laurent
- MRC: Kamouraska Regional County Municipality

Physical characteristics
- Source: Agricultural streams
  - location: Saint-André-de-Kamouraska
  - coordinates: 47.64402°N 69.75662°W
  - elevation: 120 metres (390 ft)
- Mouth: Kamouraska River
  - location: Kamouraska
  - coordinates: 47.5425°N 69.84306°W
  - elevation: 10 metres (33 ft)
- Length: 38.0 kilometres (23.6 mi)

Basin features
- Progression: Kamouraska River, St. Lawrence River
- Tributaries
  - left: (upstream) ruisseau Poivrier, ruisseau du Pont-de-Fer.
  - right: (upstream) cours d'eau Lévesque, cours d'eau Chénard.

The Goudron River (in French: rivière Goudron) is a tributary of the east bank of the Kamouraska River, which flows on the south bank of the St. Lawrence River two km east of the centre of the village of Kamouraska.

The Goudron river flows on the Côte-du-Sud in the municipalities of Saint-André-de-Kamouraska, Sainte-Hélène-de-Kamouraska, Saint-Germain-de-Kamouraska, Saint-Pascal, and Kamouraska, in the Kamouraska Regional County Municipality, in the administrative region of Bas-Saint-Laurent, in province of Quebec, in Canada.

== Geography ==
Originating from a marsh area in Saint-André-de-Kamouraska, the Goudron River is located on either side of the highway 20 on the south of the dividing line with the Soucy-Lapointe stream which flows towards the Fouquette river; the latter empties on the southern coast of the estuary of Saint Lawrence. This source is located at 5.6 kilometres (3.5 mi) east of the southeastern coast of the St. Lawrence River and at 3.2 kilometres (2.0 mi) southeast of the center of the village of Saint-André-de-Kamouraska.

From its source, the Tar River flows over 38.0 kilometres (23.6 mi) in agricultural or village zones, divided into the following segments:

- 2.5 kilometres (1.6 mi) south-west in Saint-André-de-Kamouraska, to Route de la Station;
- 2.5 kilometres (1.6 mi) southwest, to highway 20 that it crosses;
- 3.5 kilometres (2.2 mi) southwesterly, along the northwest side of autoroute 20 that it crosses again at the limit of Saint-André-de-Kamouraska and Saint-Germain-de-Kamouraska;
- 1.6 kilometres (0.99 mi) southerly, to the southern limit of the municipality of Sainte-Hélène-de-Kamouraska;
- 1.1 kilometres (0.68 mi) northeasterly in Sainte-Hélène-de-Kamouraska, to the confluence of a stream coming from the north-east;
- 1.9 kilometres (1.2 mi) south-west, to rue de l'Église Nord, which the river cuts at 1.8 kilometres (1.1 mi) north-west of the center of the village of Sainte-Hélène-de-Kamouraska;
- 3.4 kilometres (2.1 mi) southeasterly, up to the limit of Saint-Germain-de-Kamouraska;
- 5.6 kilometres (3.5 mi) towards the south-west collecting the water of a stream coming from the south-east and crossing the road to Saint-Germain-de-Kamouraska, up to the limit of Kamouraska (Saint-Louis-de-Kamouraska sector);
- 6.8 kilometres (4.2 mi) towards the south-west passing to the south-east of the "Montagne à Plourde", up to the confluence of the Poivrier stream;
- 3.9 kilometres (2.4 mi) towards the south-west, passing to the south of the "cotton mountain" and crossing rue Varin on the east side of the village of Saint-Pascal, up to the bridge rue Rochette;
- 0.6 kilometres (0.37 mi) west, to highway 20;
- 3.1 kilometres (1.9 mi) north-west, up to the road to Rang de l'Embarrass;
- 1.5 kilometres (0.93 mi) westward, up to its confluence.

This confluence is located at 4.9 kilometres (3.0 mi) east of the southeastern coast of the estuary of Saint Lawrence, at 5.5 kilometres (3.4 mi) to the northeast from the center of the village of Saint-Pascal, at 3.2 kilometres (2.0 mi) north-west of the center of the village of Kamouraska, and at 6.3 kilometres (3.9 mi) southwest of the center of the village of Saint-Germain-de-Kamouraska.

== Toponymy ==
The toponym Rivière Goudron was formalized on December 5, 1968 by the Commission de toponymie du Québec.

== See also ==
- List of rivers of Quebec
