= Fouquette River =

River in MRC Kamouraska in Quebec (Canada)

- Location within Quebec
- Native name: Rivière Fouquette (French)

Location
- Country: Canada
- Province: Quebec
- Region: Bas-Saint-Laurent
- MRC: Kamouraska Regional County Municipality

Physical characteristics
- Source: Agricultural streams
  - location: Sainte-Hélène-de-Kamouraska
  - coordinates: 47.585744°N 69.715765°W
  - elevation: 132 metres (433 ft)
- Mouth: St. Lawrence River
  - location: Saint-André-de-Kamouraska
  - coordinates: 47.70111°N 69.7025°W
  - elevation: 3 metres (9.8 ft)
- Length: 21.6 kilometres (13.4 mi)

Basin features
- Progression: Kamouraska River, St. Lawrence River
- Tributaries
  - left: (upstream) Cours d'eau Soucy-Lapointe
  - right: (upstream) Ruisseau Turgeon

The Fouquette river (in French: rivière Fouquette) is a tributary of the southern coast of the St. Lawrence River where it flows in front of the "Les Pèlerins" islands, in Saint-André-de-Kamouraska. This river flows in the municipalities of Sainte-Hélène-de-Kamouraska, Saint-André-de-Kamouraska and Saint-Alexandre, in the Kamouraska Regional County Municipality, in the administrative region of Bas-Saint-Laurent, in province of Quebec, in Canada.

== Geography ==
The Fouquette River has its source in an agricultural area located 5.8 kilometres (3.6 mi) south-east of the south-eastern coast of the estuary of Saint Lawrence, 1.3 kilometres (0.81 mi) south-east of the village center from Sainte-Hélène-de-Kamouraska and 2.2 kilometres (1.4 mi) southeast of highway 20.

From its source, the Fouquette River flows for 21.6 kilometres (13.4 mi), divided into the following segments:

- 5.3 kilometres (3.3 mi) northeast in Sainte-Hélène-de-Kamouraska, to route 230 West;
- 1.5 kilometres (0.93 mi) north-west, then north-east, to the Route de la Station which crosses the hamlet "Saint-André-Station";
- 3.5 kilometres (2.2 mi) north-east in Saint-André-de-Kamouraska, including a 0.6 km (0.37 mi) segment in Saint-Alexandre, up to the Lapointe road;
- 3.5 kilometres (2.2 mi) north-east, of which about 320 m (1,050 ft) in a marsh area constitutes the limit between Saint-André-de-Kamouraska and Saint-Alexandre, up to the limit of Saint-Alexandre;
- 1.8 kilometres (1.1 mi) north, to highway 20, which it crosses;
- 0.3 kilometres (0.19 mi) northeast, to route 289;
- 0.4 kilometres (0.25 mi) north, to the Saint-André-de-Kamouraska limit;
- 2.2 kilometres (1.4 mi) north-west, flowing near the rivière des Caps, up to the route 132 which it crosses;
- 3.1 kilometres (1.9 mi) south-west, up to its confluence.

The confluence of the Fouquette river is located on a long shore at low tide, at the foot of "La Grosse Montagne", 3.4 km (2.1 mi) northeast of the center of the village of Saint-André-de-Kamouraska, 6.1 km (3.8 mi) to the west of the center of the village of Saint-Alexandre-de-Kamouraska and 3.4 km (2.1 mi) west of the junction of exit 488 of highway 20.

== Toponymy ==
The term “Fouquette” constitutes a surname of French origin.

The toponym “Rivière Fouquette” was formalized on December 5, 1968, by the Commission de toponymie du Québec.

== See also ==
- List of rivers of Quebec
