= Rivière du Loup (Bas-Saint-Laurent) =

Rivière du Loup (English: Wolf River)
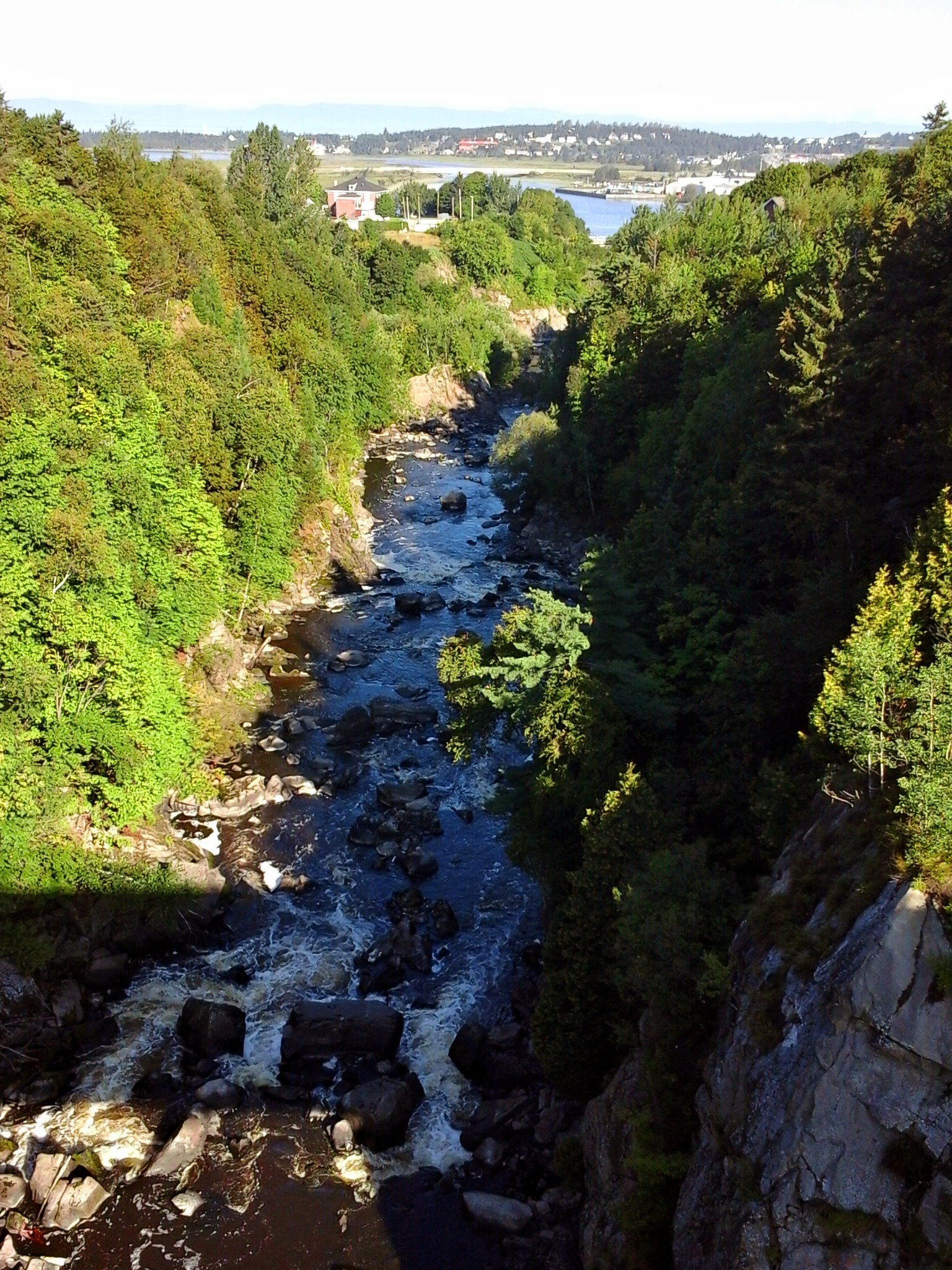
- Gorge of the Riviere du Loup at the city of Rivière-du-Loup

Location
- Country: Canada
- Province: Quebec

Physical characteristics
- Source: Saint-Pierre Lake
  - elevation: 479 m (1,572 ft)
- Mouth: Saint Lawrence River
  - location: Rivière-du-Loup
  - coordinates: 47°51′07″N 69°33′16″W
  - elevation: 0 ft (0 m)
- Length: 101.3 km (62.9 mi)

The Rivière du Loup (French pronunciation: [ʁivjɛʁ dy lu]) is a river in eastern Quebec, Canada, which empties on the south shore of Saint Lawrence River at the city of Rivière-du-Loup, which is part of the regional county municipality (RCM) Rivière-du-Loup, in the administrative region of Bas-Saint-Laurent.

There is a hydroelectric plant on the river near the city.

== Geography ==
The Rivière du Loup (English: "river of the Wolf") has its source in Saint-Pierre Lake (Lac Saint-Pierre) in the geographic township of Painchaud in the Kamouraska Regional County Municipality, which is in the Notre Dame Mountains and the Zone d'exploitation contrôlée (English: Controlled Harvesting Zone) of Zec Chapais. This lake is located 36.5 km (23 miles) east of the southeast coast of the Gulf of St. Lawrence, 20 km (12 miles) southeast of the village center of Saint-Bruno-of-Kamouraska and 20 km (12 miles) south-west of the village center of Saint-Athanase.

The Rivière du Loup flows to the north over 101.3 kilometers (63 miles), coursing through the regional county municipalities of:

- MRC Kamouraska: municipalities (starting from the upstream)
  - Mont-Carmel
  - Saint-Bruno-de-Kamouraska
  - Sainte-Hélène-de-Kamouraska
  - Saint-Joseph-de-Kamouraska
  - Saint-Alexandre-de-Kamouraska
- MRC Rivière-du-Loup: municipalities (starting from the upstream)
  - Saint-Antonin
  - Notre-Dame-du-Portage
  - Rivière-du-Loup city.

At its mouth, the Rivière du Loup pours over a long ledge (at low tide) in the "Cayes to Carrier Bay" which is bordered on the north side by the Pointe-de-Rivière-du-Loup. From Malin Rock, this edge advances towards the southwest in the St. Lawrence River over a length of 1.6 km (1 mile), including the end where a marina is fitted.

The river's mouth is located in front of the Île aux Lièvres (English: Island of Hare) and the Île Blanche (English: White Island), located 10 km (6 miles) offshore and part of the municipality of Saint-André-de-Kamouraska. The Channel "Pot à l'Eau-de-Vie" (English: "Pot of stream water") separates the island and the southeast coast of St. Lawrence River. The Estuary Islands Wildlife Reserve (Réserve faunique des Îles de l'Estuaire) was built on a set of islands between the Île aux Lièvres and the channel Pot à l'Eau-de-Vie.

== Toponymy ==
The river's name means Wolf River in French and may have come from a native tribe known as "Les Loups" or from the many seals, known in French as loup marin, once found at the river's mouth.
