= Rivière des Caps =

River in MRC Kamouraska in Quebec (Canada)

- Location within Quebec

Location
- Country: Canada
- Province: Quebec
- Region: Bas-Saint-Laurent
- MRC: Kamouraska Regional County Municipality

Physical characteristics
- Source: Agricultural streams
  - location: Notre-Dame-du-Portage
  - coordinates: 47.726835°N 69.624057°W
  - elevation: 108 metres (354 ft)
- Mouth: St. Lawrence River
  - location: Saint-André-de-Kamouraska
  - coordinates: 47.7225°N 69.67639°W
  - elevation: 3 metres (9.8 ft)

Basin features
- Progression: Kamouraska River, St. Lawrence River
- Tributaries
  - left: (upstream)
  - right: (upstream)

The rivière des Caps (in English: Capes River) is a tributary of the southern coast of the St. Lawrence River where it flows in front of the Les Pèlerins islands, in Saint-André-de-Kamouraska. This river flows in the municipalities of Notre-Dame-du-Portage, Saint-Alexandre-de-Kamouraska and Saint-André-de-Kamouraska, in the Kamouraska Regional County Municipality, in the administrative region of Bas-Saint-Laurent, in province of Quebec, in Canada.

== Toponymy ==
According to the Commission de toponymie du Québec, the toponym "rivière des Caps" appears in a volume dated 1787. This toponym is linked to the rocky cape located on the east side of its confluence. This rocky cape and the Grosse Montagne (located near the confluence of the Fouquette River) were once used as landmarks in the sector for visual navigation.

The toponym “rivière des Caps” was formalized on December 5, 1968, by the Commission de toponymie du Québec.

== See also ==
- List of rivers of Quebec
