= Charles-Alfred Desjardins =

Canadian farmer, merchant and politician (1846 - 1934)

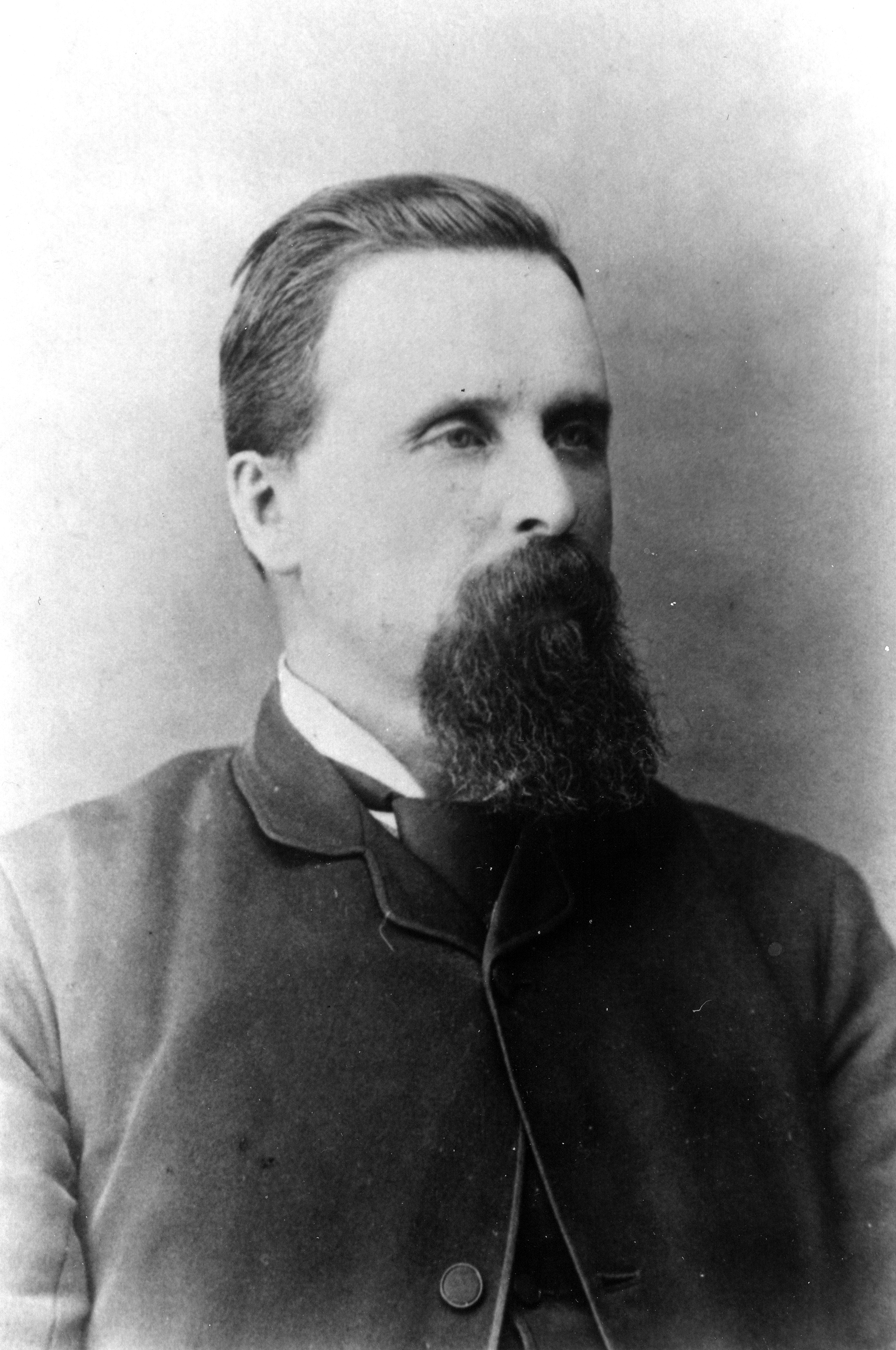
Charles-Alfred Desjardins

Charles-Alfred Desjardins (January 26, 1846 – September 6, 1934) was a farmer, merchant, manufacturer and political figure in Quebec. He represented Kamouraska in the Legislative Assembly of Quebec from 1890 to 1897 as a Conservative. He was also known as Charles-Alfred Roy dit Desjardins.

He was born in Kamouraska, Canada East, the son of Joseph Roy dit Desjardins and Rose Ouellet, and was educated there. He first worked as a navigator like his father, then purchased a clock factory that he converted to manufacture agricultural equipment. He later became involved in the production of automobiles. Desjardin was postmaster and telegraph operator at Saint-André from 1884 to 1913. He built and operated aqueducts at Saint-André and Cabano, as well as the telephone system at Kamouraska. Desjardins was an unsuccessful candidate for a seat in the Quebec assembly in 1886. He was given the award of Commander in the Order of Saint Gregory the Great. He was married twice: to Émilie Dumont in 1867 and to Eugénie Godbout in 1913. Desjardins died in Saint-André at the age of 88.
