= Saint-Pacôme =

- Municipality
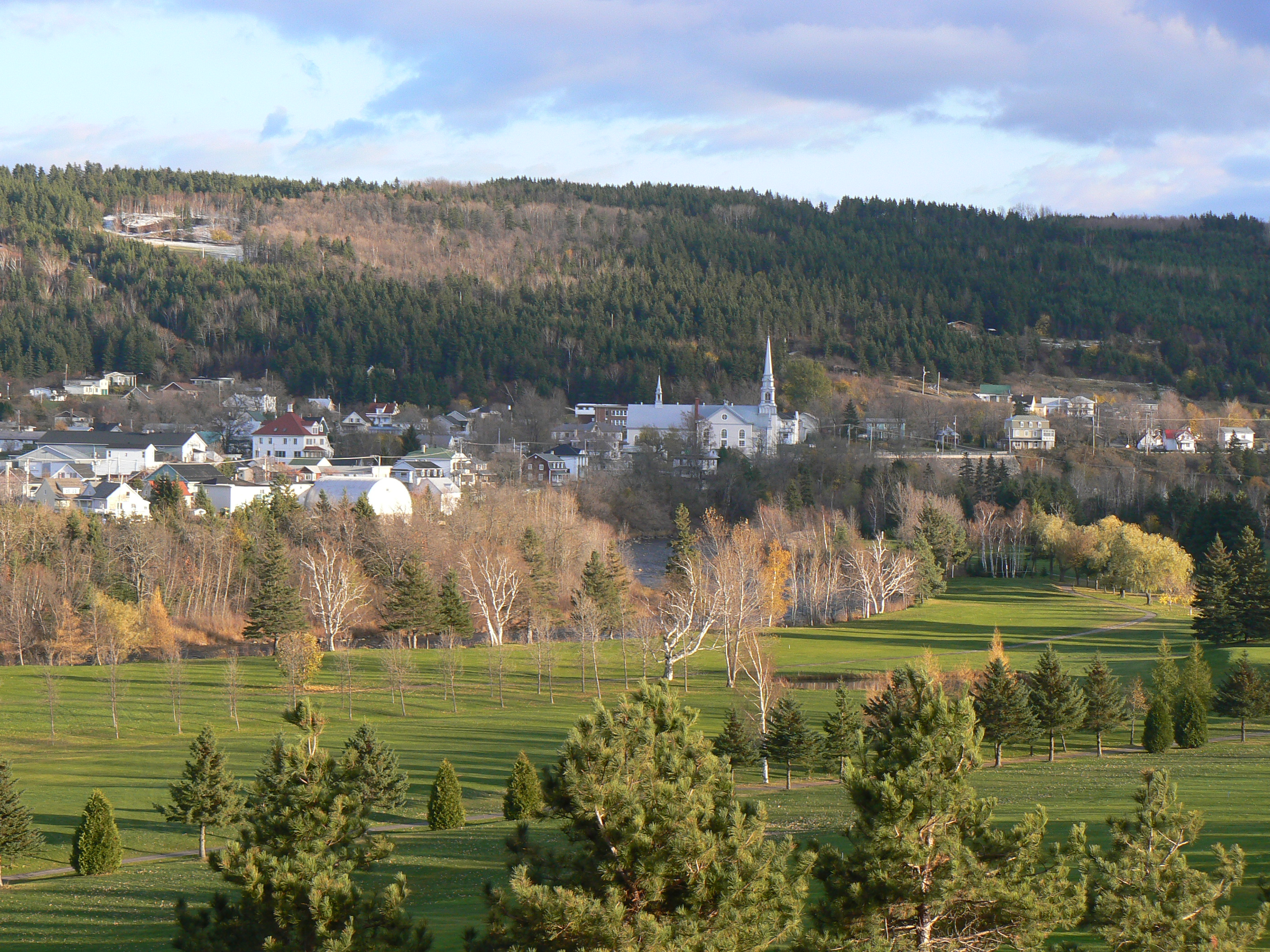

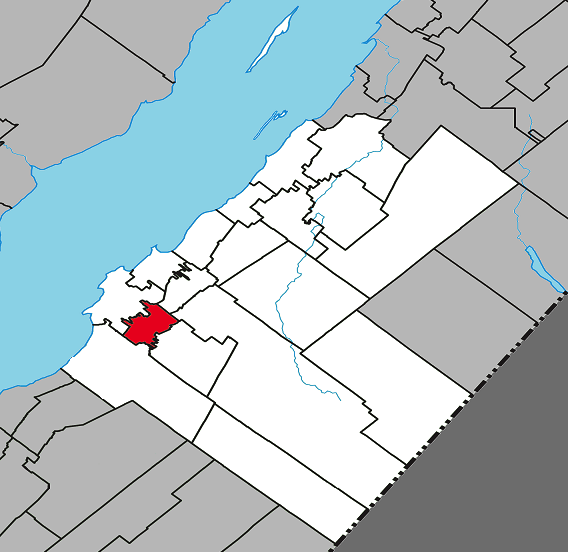
- Location within Kamouraska RCM

- Location in eastern Quebec
- Coordinates: 47°24′N 69°57′W
- Country: Canada
- Province: Quebec
- Region: Bas-Saint-Laurent
- RCM: Kamouraska
- Constituted: January 5, 1980

Government
  - Mayor: Louise Chamberland
  - Federal riding: Côte-du-Sud—Rivière-du-Loup—Kataskomiq—Témiscouata
  - Prov. riding: Côte-du-Sud

Area
  - Municipality: 29.40 km^{2} (11.35 sq mi)
  - Land: 29.06 km^{2} (11.22 sq mi)
  - Urban: 1.16 km^{2} (0.45 sq mi)

Population (2021)
  - Municipality: 1,806
  - Density: 62.1/km^{2} (161/sq mi)
  - Urban: 1,145
  - Urban density: 985.4/km^{2} (2,552/sq mi)
  - Pop 2016-2021: ▲13.0%
  - Dwellings: 748
- Time zone: UTC−5 (EST)
  - Summer (DST): UTC−4 (EDT)
- Postal code(s): G0L 3X0
- Area codes: 418 and 581
- Highways A-20 (TCH): R-230
- Website: www.st-pacome.ca

Saint-Pacôme (French pronunciation: [sɛ̃ pakom]) is a municipality in the Canadian province of Quebec, located in the Kamouraska Regional County Municipality. Saint-Pacome Catholic Church is located in the town.

== Demographics ==
In the 2021 Census of Population conducted by Statistics Canada, Saint-Pacôme had a population of 1,806 living in 702 of its 748 total private dwellings, an increase of 13% from its 2016 population of 1,598. With a land area of 29.06 km^{2} (11.22 sq mi), it had a population density of 62.1/km^{2} (161.0/sq mi) in 2021.

=== Population ===
Population trend:

Census	Population	Change (%)
2021	1,806	▲13.0%
2016	1,598	▼3.6%
2011	1,658	▼1.6%
2006	1,685	▼1.2%
2001	1,706	▼5.2%
1996	1,799	▼4.3%
1991	1,880	▼6.7%
1986	2,015	▲1.0%
1981	1,996	N/A

=== Language ===
Mother tongue language (2021)

Language	Population	Pct (%)
French only	1,760	98.3%
English only	10	0.6%
Both English and French	0	0.0%
Other languages	5	0.3%

== Government ==
=== Governing body ===
- Mayor: Louise Chamberland
- Councillors: Cédric Valois-Mercier, Jennifer Ouellet, Virginie St-Pierre-Gagné, Annick D'Amours, Benoît Harton, Chantal Boily

=== Political representation ===
Saint-Pâcome federal election results
Year	Liberal		Conservative		Bloc Québécois		New Democratic		Green	
2025	26%	141	46%	248	22%	116	2%	11	3%	14
2021	15%	107	47%	337	32%	234	4%	32	0%	0
2019	16%	137	39%	328	34%	290	9%	73	2%	13
2015	26%	155	26%	157	17%	101	28%	171	3%	16
2011	2%	19	29%	223	28%	219	39%	300	2%	17
2008	8%	58	22%	162	64%	476	4%	29	1%	11
2006	6%	41	18%	137	67%	497	5%	34	4%	32
2004	19%	141	4%	32	73%	541	2%	12	2%	13

Saint-Pacôme provincial election results
Year	CAQ		Liberal		QC solidaire		Parti Québécois	
2022	40%	238	7%	41	13%	81	19%	116
2018	52%	461	18%	164	13%	119	15%	130
2014	27%	251	31%	294	10%	97	29%	269
2012	27%	229	22%	184	4%	32	44%	367

Saint-Pacôme forms part of the federal electoral district of Côte-du-Sud—Rivière-du-Loup—Kataskomiq—Témiscouata and has been represented by Bernard Généreux of the Conservative Party since 2015. Provincially, Saint-Pacôme is part of the Côte-du-Sud electoral district and is represented by Frédéric Poulin of the Conservative Party of Quebec since 2026.

== Notable people ==
- André Gagnon, pianist and composer

== See also ==
- List of municipalities in Quebec
