= Saint-Germain-de-Kamouraska =

- Municipality
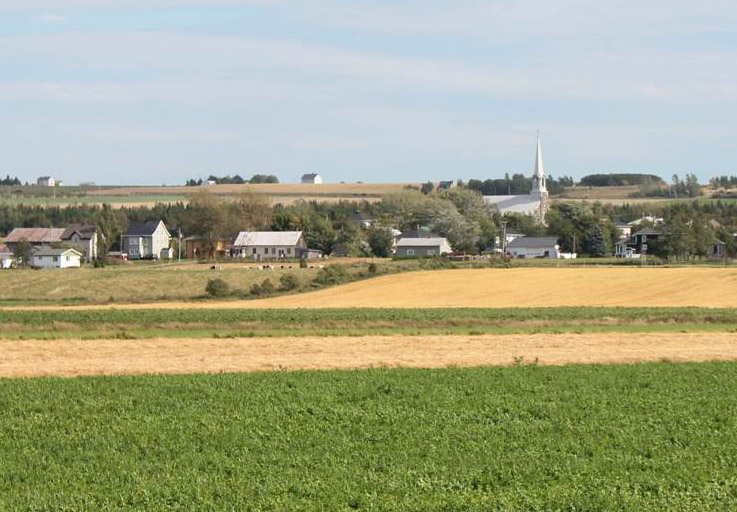

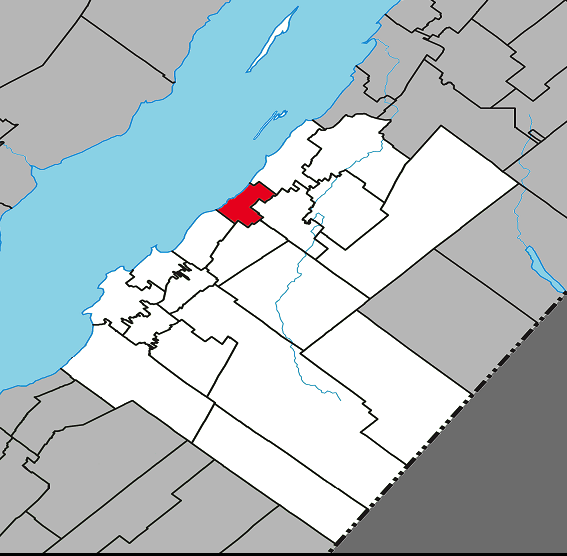
- Location within Kamouraska RCM

- Location in eastern Quebec
- Coordinates: 47°35′N 69°48′W
- Country: Canada
- Province: Quebec
- Region: Bas-Saint-Laurent
- RCM: Kamouraska
- Constituted: June 29, 1893

Government
  - Mayor: Roger Moreau
  - Federal riding: Côte-du-Sud—Rivière-du-Loup—Kataskomiq—Témiscouata
  - Prov. riding: Côte-du-Sud

Area
  - Total: 91.60 km^{2} (35.37 sq mi)
  - Land: 28.53 km^{2} (11.02 sq mi)

Population (2021)
  - Total: 294
  - Density: 10.3/km^{2} (27/sq mi)
  - Pop 2016-2021: ▲2.8%
  - Dwellings: 163
- Time zone: UTC−5 (EST)
  - Summer (DST): UTC−4 (EDT)
- Postal code(s): G0L 3G0
- Area codes: 418 and 581
- Highways A-20 (TCH): R-132

Saint-Germain-de-Kamouraska (French pronunciation: [sɛ̃ ʒɛʁmɛ̃ də kamuʁaska]) is a municipality in the Canadian province of Quebec, located in the Kamouraska Regional County Municipality.

== See also ==
- List of municipalities in Quebec
