= Saint-Joseph-de-Kamouraska =

- Parish municipality
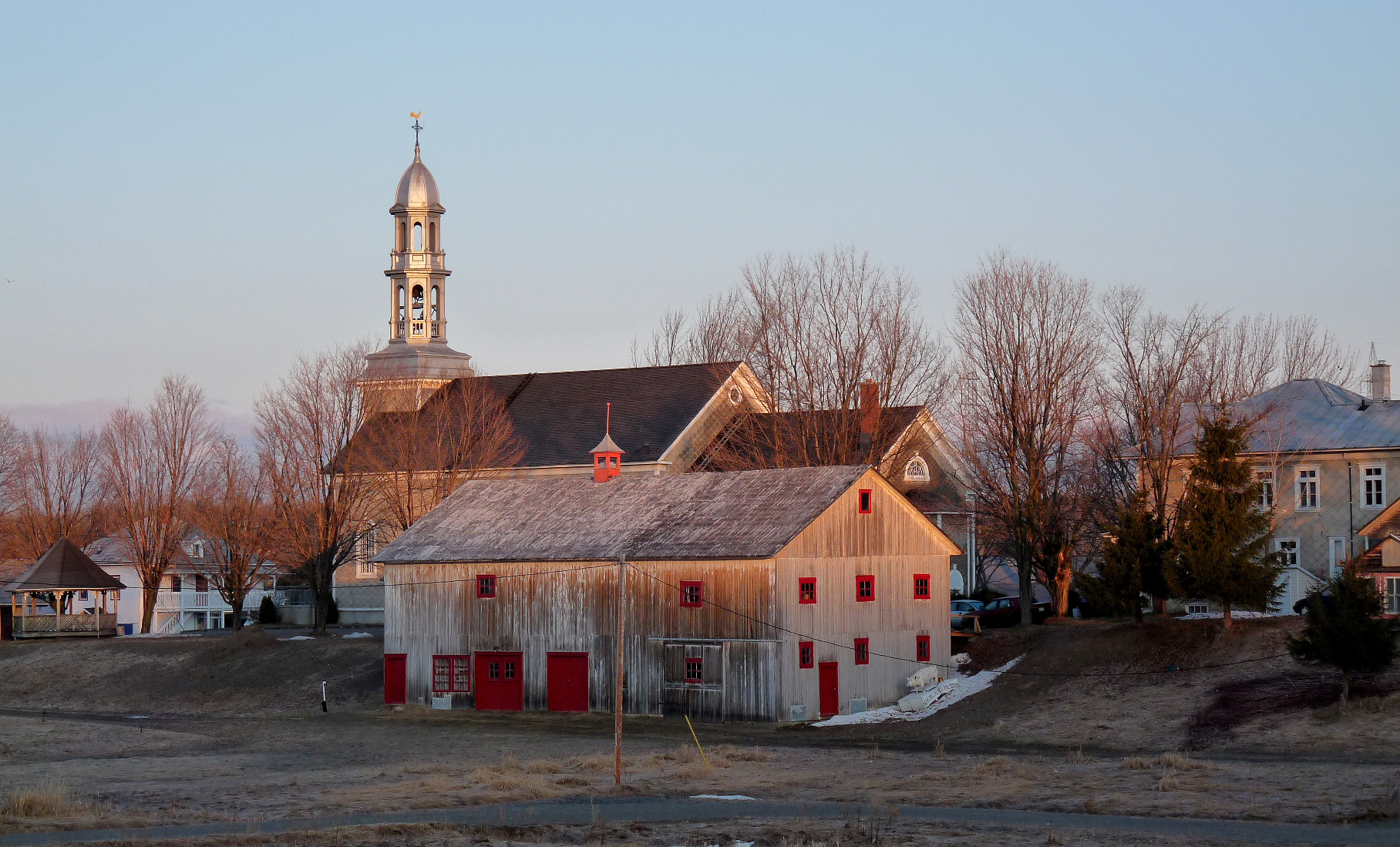
- Church of Saint-Joseph-de-Kamouraska

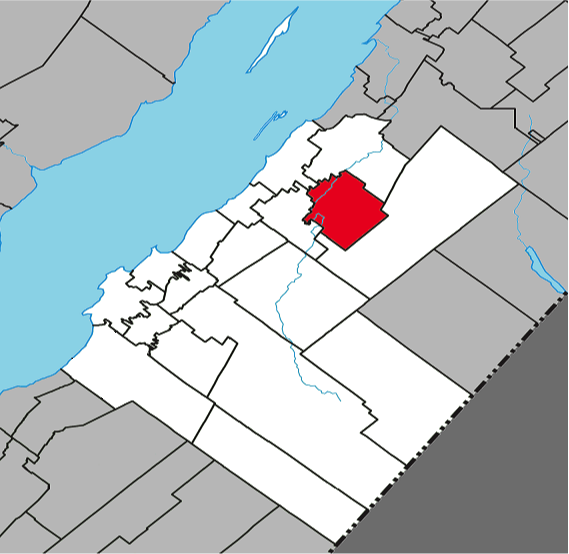
- Location within Kamouraska RCM

- Location in eastern Quebec
- Coordinates: 47°37′N 69°38′W
- Country: Canada
- Province: Quebec
- Region: Bas-Saint-Laurent
- RCM: Kamouraska
- Constituted: January 14, 1924

Government
  - Mayor: Nancy St-Pierre
  - Federal riding: Côte-du-Sud—Rivière-du-Loup—Kataskomiq—Témiscouata
  - Prov. riding: Côte-du-Sud

Area
  - Total: 86.50 km^{2} (33.40 sq mi)
  - Land: 84.96 km^{2} (32.80 sq mi)

Population (2021)
  - Total: 398
  - Density: 4.7/km^{2} (12/sq mi)
  - Pop 2016-2021: ▲1.8%
  - Dwellings: 176
- Time zone: UTC−5 (EST)
  - Summer (DST): UTC−4 (EDT)
- Postal code(s): G0L 3P0
- Area codes: 418 and 581
- Highways: No major routes
- Website: www.stjosephkam.ca

Saint-Joseph-de-Kamouraska (French pronunciation: [sɛ̃ ʒozɛf də kamuʁaska]) is a parish municipality in the Canadian province of Quebec, located in the Kamouraska Regional County Municipality in the Bas-Saint-Laurent region.

== Demographics ==
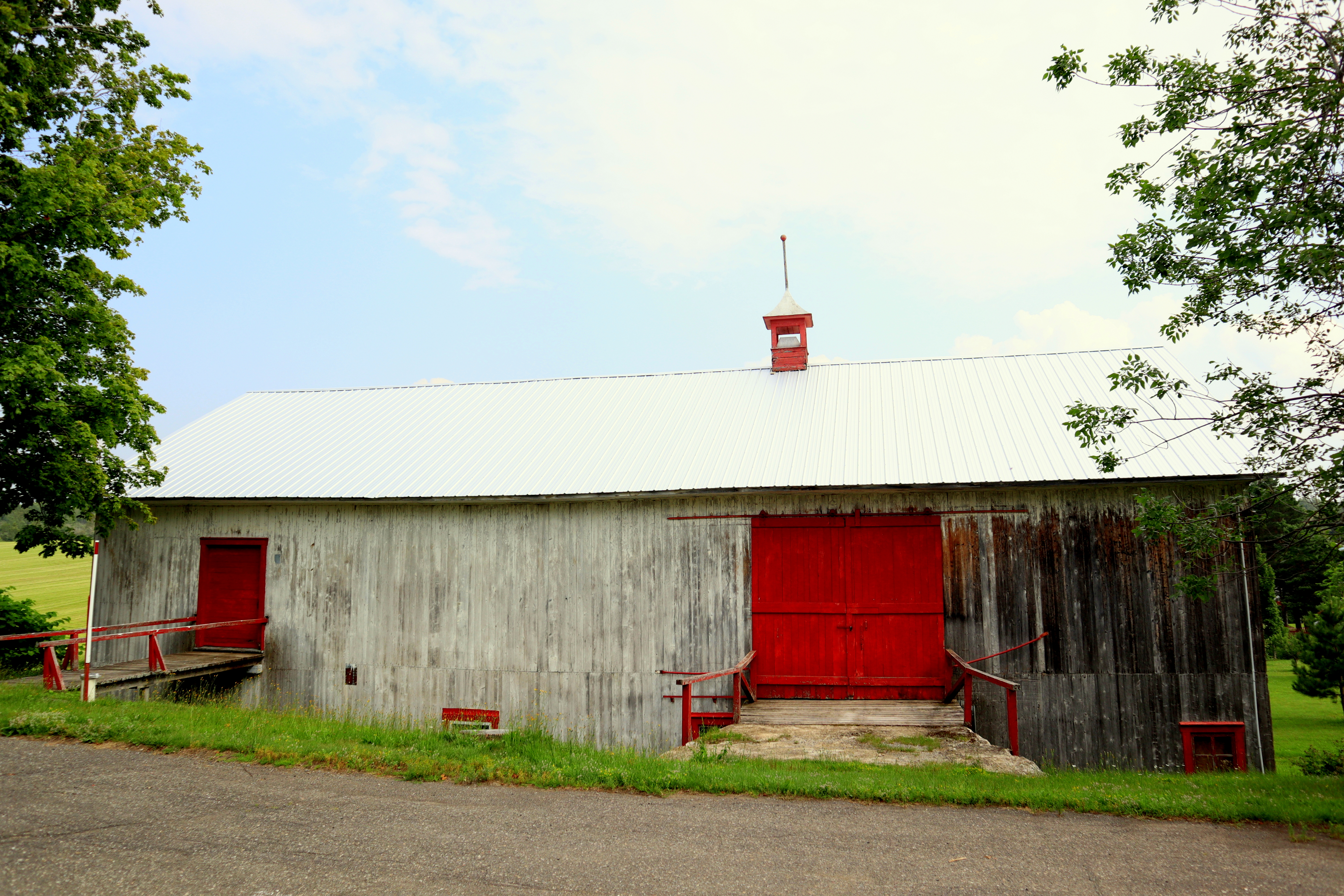

In the 2021 Census of Population conducted by Statistics Canada, Saint-Joseph-de-Kamouraska had a population of 398 living in 165 of its 176 total private dwellings, a change of 1.8% from its 2016 population of 391. With a land area of 84.96 km^{2} (32.80 sq mi), it had a population density of 4.7/km^{2} (12.1/sq mi) in 2021.

== See also ==
- List of parish municipalities in Quebec
