= Notre-Dame-du-Portage =

- Municipality
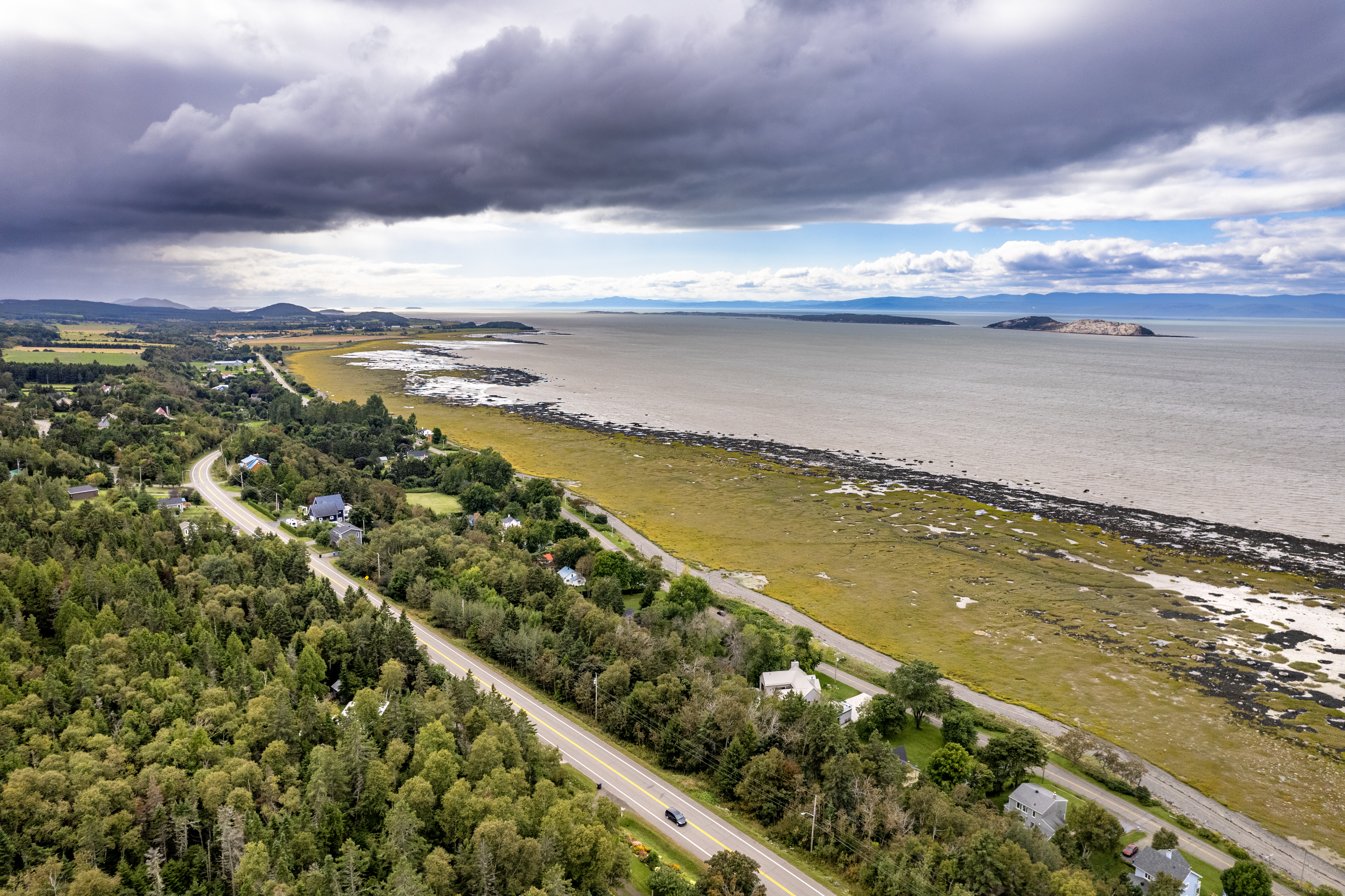

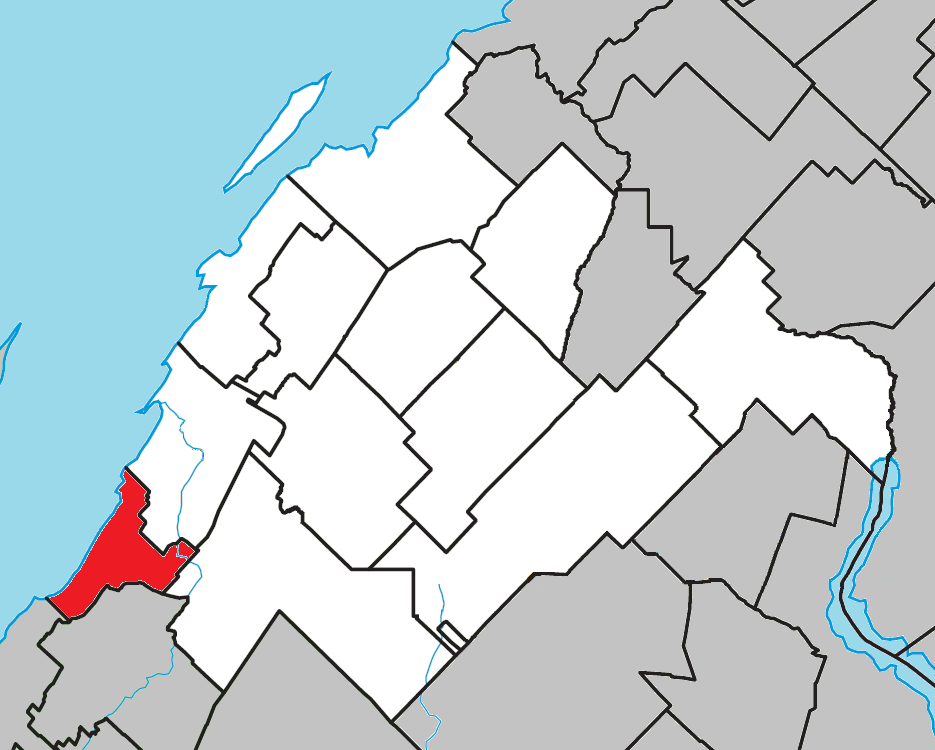
- Location within Rivière-du-Loup RCM

- Location in eastern Quebec
- Coordinates: 47°46′N 69°37′W
- Country: Canada
- Province: Quebec
- Region: Bas-Saint-Laurent
- RCM: Rivière-du-Loup
- Constituted: July 19, 1856

Government
  - Mayor: Suzette de Rome
  - Federal riding: Côte-du-Sud—Rivière-du-Loup—Kataskomiq—Témiscouata
  - Prov. riding: Rivière-du-Loup–Témiscouata–Les Basques

Area
  - Total: 115.90 km^{2} (44.75 sq mi)
  - Land: 40.06 km^{2} (15.47 sq mi)

Population (2021)
  - Total: 1,296
  - Density: 32.4/km^{2} (84/sq mi)
  - Pop 2016-2021: ▲12.6%
  - Dwellings: 748
- Time zone: UTC−5 (EST)
  - Summer (DST): UTC−4 (EDT)
- Postal code(s): G0L 1Y0
- Area codes: 418 and 581
- Highways A-20 (TCH): R-132
- Website: www.municipalite.notre-dame-du-portage.qc.ca

Notre-Dame-du-Portage (French pronunciation: [nɔtʁ dam dy pɔʁtaʒ]) is a municipality in the Canadian province of Quebec located at the edge of the Saint Lawrence River in the Bas-Saint-Laurent region. It is part of the Rivière-du-Loup Regional County Municipality and home to the Rivière-du-Loup Golf Club.

== History ==
The municipality of Notre-Dame-du-Portage was officially created on July 19, 1856, by merging two sections of Rivière-du-Loup and Saint-André.

Construction of the first chapel began on May 30, 1855, under the supervision of Rivière-du-Loup priest Narcisse Beaubien. The first mass was celebrated there on November 1, 1855, by priest Beaubien, while the chapel received his blessing. The parish was canonically erected on March 1, 1856, while the parish municipality was officially created on July 19 of the same year from territories of the parishes of Saint-Patrice de Rivière-du-Loup and Saint-André-de-Kamouraska. A small Stations of the Cross given free of charge at the chapel was blessed by Father Michaud on March 10, 1857. Father Beaubien is often considered to be the founder of the parish of Notre-Dame-du-Portage, but the first resident priest was Father Esdras Rousseau, from 1858 to 1860. Construction of the current church, in Romanesque art, began in 1859 with two contractors, Charles Bernier of Cap-Saint-Ignace and Philippe Fortin of Montmagny; the cornerstone was blessed on July 21, 1859. Construction of the church was completed in 1863, but the first mass was celebrated there in 1862. The chapel was transformed into a clergy house. In 1889, a carillon of three bells was added to the church by Father de la Chevrotière; The bells were made in Villedieu, France, by Maison Havard and imported by J.-A. Langlais, of Quebec City. The carillon was blessed by Cardinal Elzéar-Alexandre Taschereau on June 16, 1889. The first Stations of the Cross in the church were purchased in September 1892 by Father Girard; it was painted on canvas. In September of the same year, Father Girard also purchased a white Madonna placed in the façade of the church. In 1906, a second Stations of the Cross was purchased; it was composed of a series of oil-painted canvases. It was blessed and installed by Father Taschereau on October 27, 1907. In 1983, a Casavant pipe organ dating from 1906 was purchased from the Franciscan monastery of Quebec for $2,000. It was inaugurated in February of the following year. On November 19, 2005, Notre-Dame-du-Portage changed its status from parish municipality to municipality. In the summer of 2006, the municipality celebrated its 150th anniversary of founding.

In 2005, Notre-Dame-du-Portage changed status from a Parish municipality to become a regular municipality.

== Geography ==
=== Climate ===
Climate data for Notre-Dame-du-Portage
Month	Jan	Feb	Mar	Apr	May	Jun	Jul	Aug	Sep	Oct	Nov	Dec	Year
Record high °C (°F)	13.5 (56.3)	10.0 (50.0)	16.5 (61.7)	26.5 (79.7)	32.0 (89.6)	32.0 (89.6)	33.0 (91.4)	37.8 (100.0)	29.0 (84.2)	26.1 (79.0)	20.0 (68.0)	12.5 (54.5)	37.8 (100.0)
Mean daily maximum °C (°F)	−7.3 (18.9)	−5.1 (22.8)	−0.4 (31.3)	6.5 (43.7)	14.0 (57.2)	19.5 (67.1)	22.4 (72.3)	21.1 (70.0)	16.0 (60.8)	9.6 (49.3)	2.7 (36.9)	−3.7 (25.3)	7.9 (46.2)
Daily mean °C (°F)	−12.2 (10.0)	−10 (14)	−4.7 (23.5)	2.5 (36.5)	9.0 (48.2)	14.3 (57.7)	17.0 (62.6)	15.9 (60.6)	11.5 (52.7)	5.7 (42.3)	−0.7 (30.7)	−8 (18)	3.4 (38.1)
Mean daily minimum °C (°F)	−17.0 (1.4)	−14.8 (5.4)	−9.0 (15.8)	−1.6 (29.1)	4.1 (39.4)	9.0 (48.2)	11.6 (52.9)	10.8 (51.4)	7.0 (44.6)	1.8 (35.2)	−4.1 (24.6)	−12.2 (10.0)	−1.2 (29.8)
Record low °C (°F)	−35.0 (−31.0)	−33.3 (−27.9)	−28.0 (−18.4)	−20.0 (−4.0)	−9.4 (15.1)	0.0 (32.0)	4.4 (39.9)	3.0 (37.4)	−3.3 (26.1)	−9.4 (15.1)	−20.6 (−5.1)	−30.0 (−22.0)	−35.0 (−31.0)
Average precipitation mm (inches)	70.5 (2.78)	67.2 (2.65)	70.3 (2.77)	77.9 (3.07)	110.6 (4.35)	94.0 (3.70)	91.8 (3.61)	99.2 (3.91)	78.7 (3.10)	83.1 (3.27)	85.4 (3.36)	69.2 (2.72)	998.0 (39.29)
Source: Environment Canada (based on Saint-Simeon weather station)

== Demographics ==
Canada census – Notre-Dame-du-Portage community profile

	2021	2016	2011
Population	1,296 (+12.6% from 2016)	1,151 (-3.5% from 2011)	1,193 (-5.5% from 2006)
Land area	40.06 km^{2} (15.47 sq mi)	40.29 km^{2} (15.56 sq mi)	39.91 km^{2} (15.41 sq mi)
Population density	32.4/km^{2} (84/sq mi)	28.6/km^{2} (74/sq mi)	29.9/km^{2} (77/sq mi)
Median age	53.2 (M: 51.6, F: 53.6)	53.0 (M: 52.4, F: 54.3)	49.9 (M: 47.9, F: 51.2)
Private dwellings	748 (total) 597 (occupied)	693 (total) 531 (occupied)	686 (total) 522 (occupied)
Median household income	$81,000	$70,571	$67,247

References: 2021 2016 2011

== Attractions ==
Notre-Dame-du-Portage is a member of the Association of the Most Beautiful Villages of Quebec. Its Roman Catholic Church was constructed in 1859.

== See also ==
- List of municipalities in Quebec
