= Kamouraska, Quebec =

Kamouraska
- Municipality
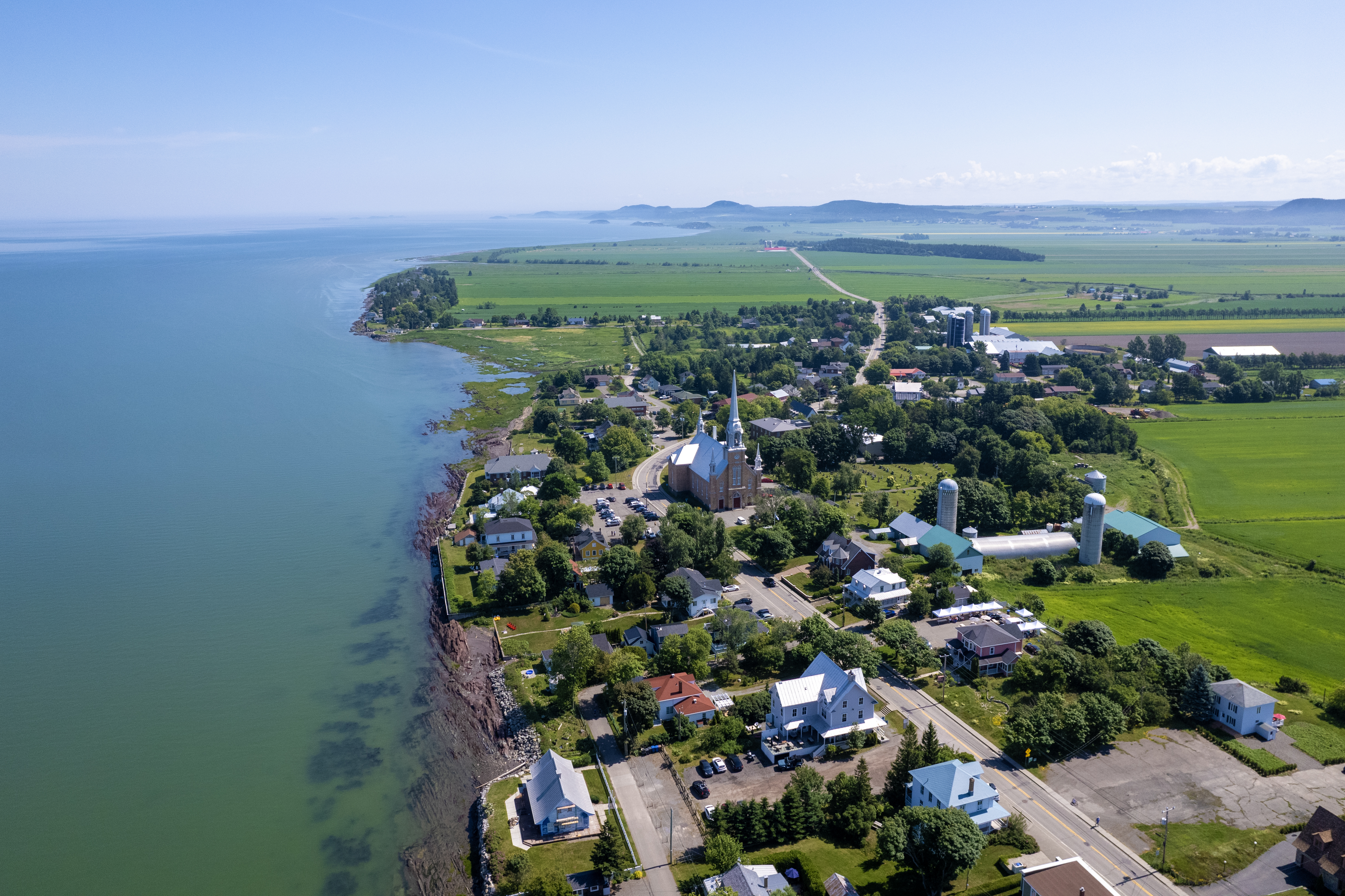
- Aerial view of Kamouraska

- Coat of arms

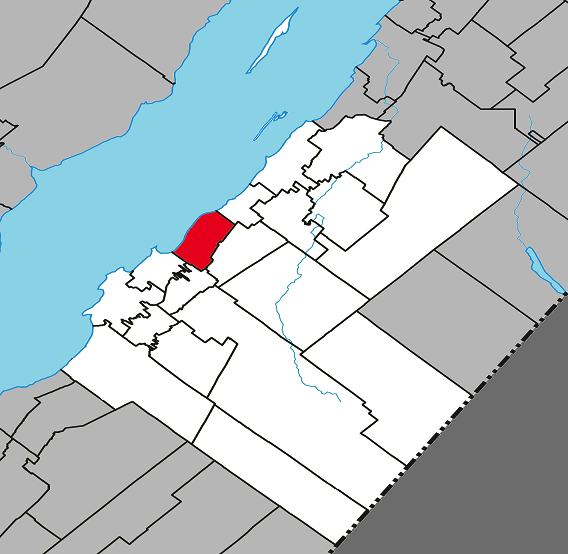
- Location within Kamouraska RCM

- Location in eastern Quebec
- Coordinates: 47°34′N 69°52′W
- Country: Canada
- Province: Quebec
- Region: Bas-Saint-Laurent
- RCM: Kamouraska
- Constituted: April 25, 1987
- Named for: Kamouraska River

Government
  - Mayor: Gilles A. Michaud
  - Federal riding: Côte-du-Sud—Rivière-du-Loup—Kataskomiq—Témiscouata
  - Prov. riding: Côte-du-Sud

Area
  - Total: 145.50 km^{2} (56.18 sq mi)
  - Land: 44.07 km^{2} (17.02 sq mi)

Population (2021)
  - Total: 607
  - Density: 13.8/km^{2} (36/sq mi)
  - Pop 2016-2021: ▼1.5%
  - Dwellings: 393
- Time zone: UTC−5 (EST)
  - Summer (DST): UTC−4 (EDT)
- Postal code(s): G0L 1M0
- Area codes: 418 and 581
- Highways A-20 (TCH): R-132
- Website: www.kamouraska.ca

Kamouraska (French pronunciation: [kamuʁaska]) is a municipality on the south shore of the Saint Lawrence River in the Bas-Saint-Laurent region of Quebec, Canada. It is part of the Regional County Municipality of Kamouraska. It has been named one of the top 20 most beautiful villages in the province of Quebec, and the municipality is a member of the Most Beautiful Villages of Quebec Association.

The name "Kamouraska" comes from an Algonquin word meaning "where rushes grow at the water's edge".

== History ==
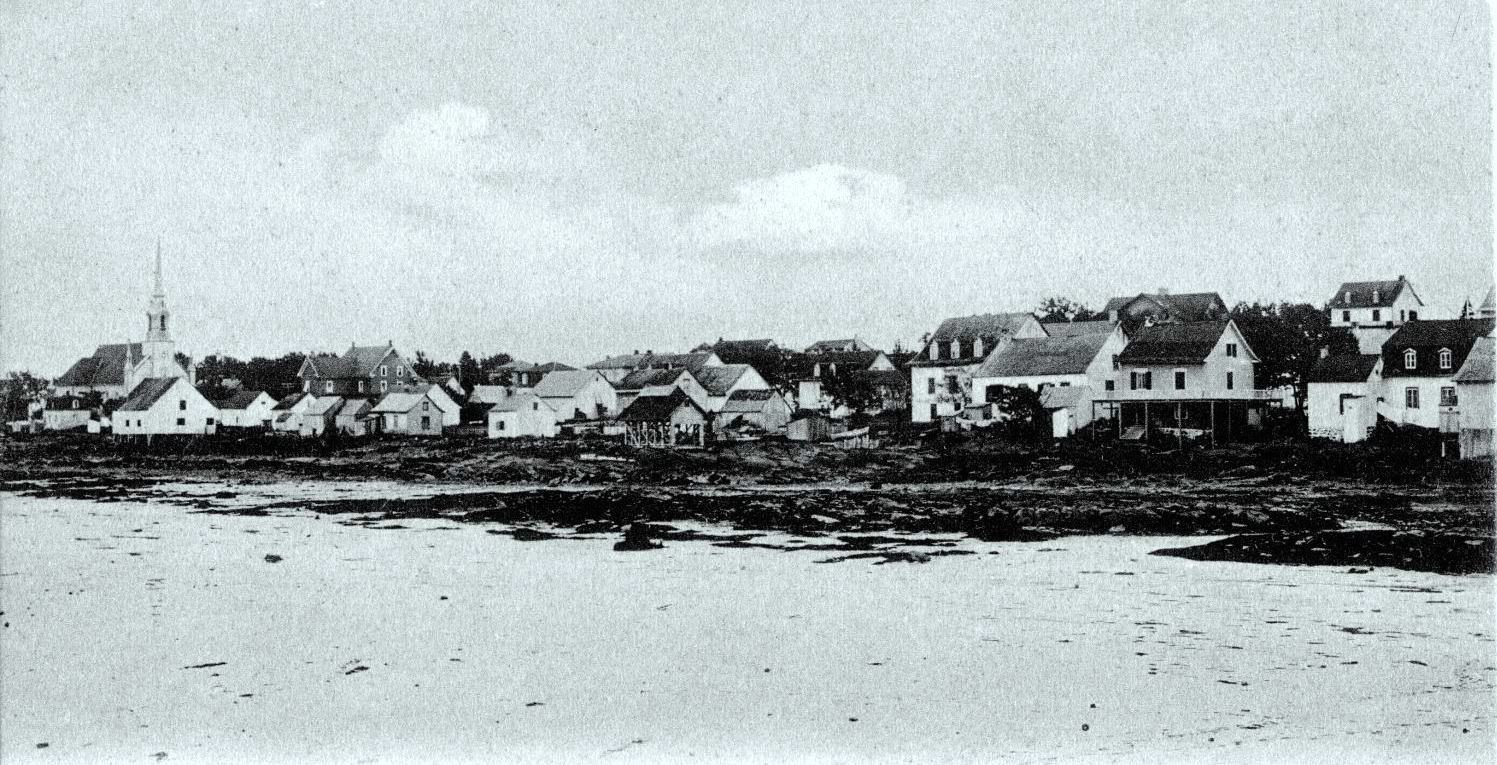
Village of Kamouraska seen from the Saint Lawrence River, ca. 1920

The area was settled by French colonists in the late 17th century. In 1674 it was designated as the Seigneury de Kamouraska, a constituent of the Gouvernement de Québec (fr). There is a long tradition of eel fishing here. An interpretive centre on eel fishing is located in the village.

== Geography ==
There are salt marshes along the river and there is an ecological reserve near the village. The marsh provides habitat used by birds for nesting and during migration. Cliffs along the river provide nesting habitat for peregrine falcons, cormorants and great blue herons. Seals can also be seen in the river here. At certain times of year, the mosquitoes found in the marshes can be particularly aggressive.

The village can be reached via Autoroute 20. Route 132 travels through the village.

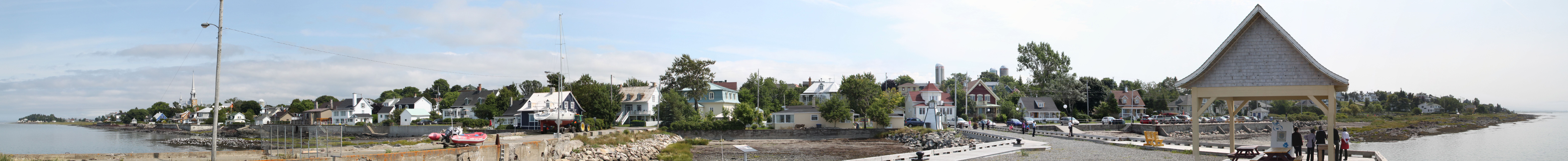
A panoramic view of Kamouraska from the Saint Lawrence River

== Arts and culture ==
Louis-Pascal-Achille Taché (1813-1839), seigneur of Kamouraska since 1833, was married to Joséphine- Éléonore d’Estimauville. In 1839 she took her children to her mother in Sorel, to leave her abusive husband. Taché was said to be killed by George Holmes, an American doctor from Sorel who was thought to be a lover of his wife. Holmes fled to the United States before the 1839 trial. Tache's wife was acquitted of complicity at the murder trial. Canadian author Anne Hébert wrote a novel based on these events, Kamouraska (1970). Published in French, it was translated into several languages. It was adapted as a 1973 film of the same name, directed by Claude Jutra and with a screenplay written by him and Hebert. It won four Canadian film awards, including Best Actress for star Geneviève Bujold.

== Government ==
- Mayor: Gilles A. Michaud
- Councillors: Michel Dion, Christian Drapeau, Bernard Labrie, Bertin Ouellet, Mario Pelletier, Hervé Voyer

== Notable people ==
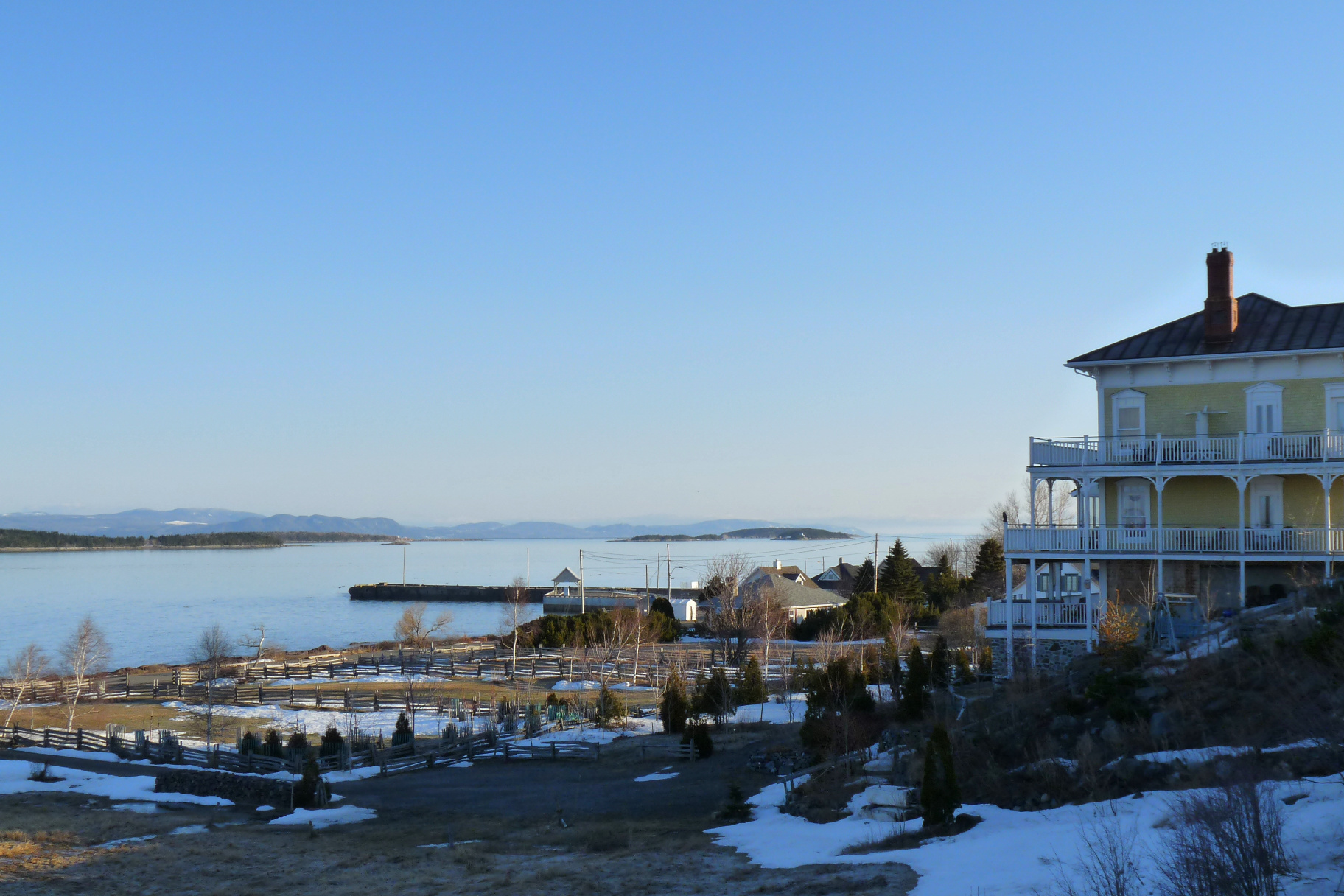
A panoramic view of the St. Lawrence in Kamouraska

- Charles Chiniquy, born here in 1809, left the Catholic priesthood and became a Presbyterian minister, giving Anti-Catholic lectures in the United States.
- René Chaloult (1901-1978), Member of the Quebec Legislative Assembly for Kamouraska, lobbied for Quebec to have its own flag, proposing the fleur-de-lis. This was recognized in 1948 by the government of Maurice Duplessis.
- Charles-Alfred Desjardins (January 26, 1846 – September 6, 1934), was a farmer, merchant, manufacturer and political figure in Quebec. He represented Kamouraska in the Legislative Assembly of Quebec from 1890 to 1897 as a Conservative. He was also known as Charles-Alfred Roy dit Desjardins.
- Marie-Louise Meilleur (1880-1998) was a supercentarian, who was born and grew up here, and returned later in life. In 1997-1998, she was ranked as the oldest recognized living person and the oldest validated Canadian ever; she lived to 117 years of age.
- Adolphe-Basile Routhier, an attorney and judge of the Superior Court, lived here from 1864-1891. He wrote the French lyrics to the song "O Canada"; its second verse expresses his love for Kamouraska ("Sous l'œil de Dieu, près du fleuve géant, Le Canadien grandit en espérant").

== See also ==
- List of municipalities in Quebec
