= Saint-Pascal =

- City
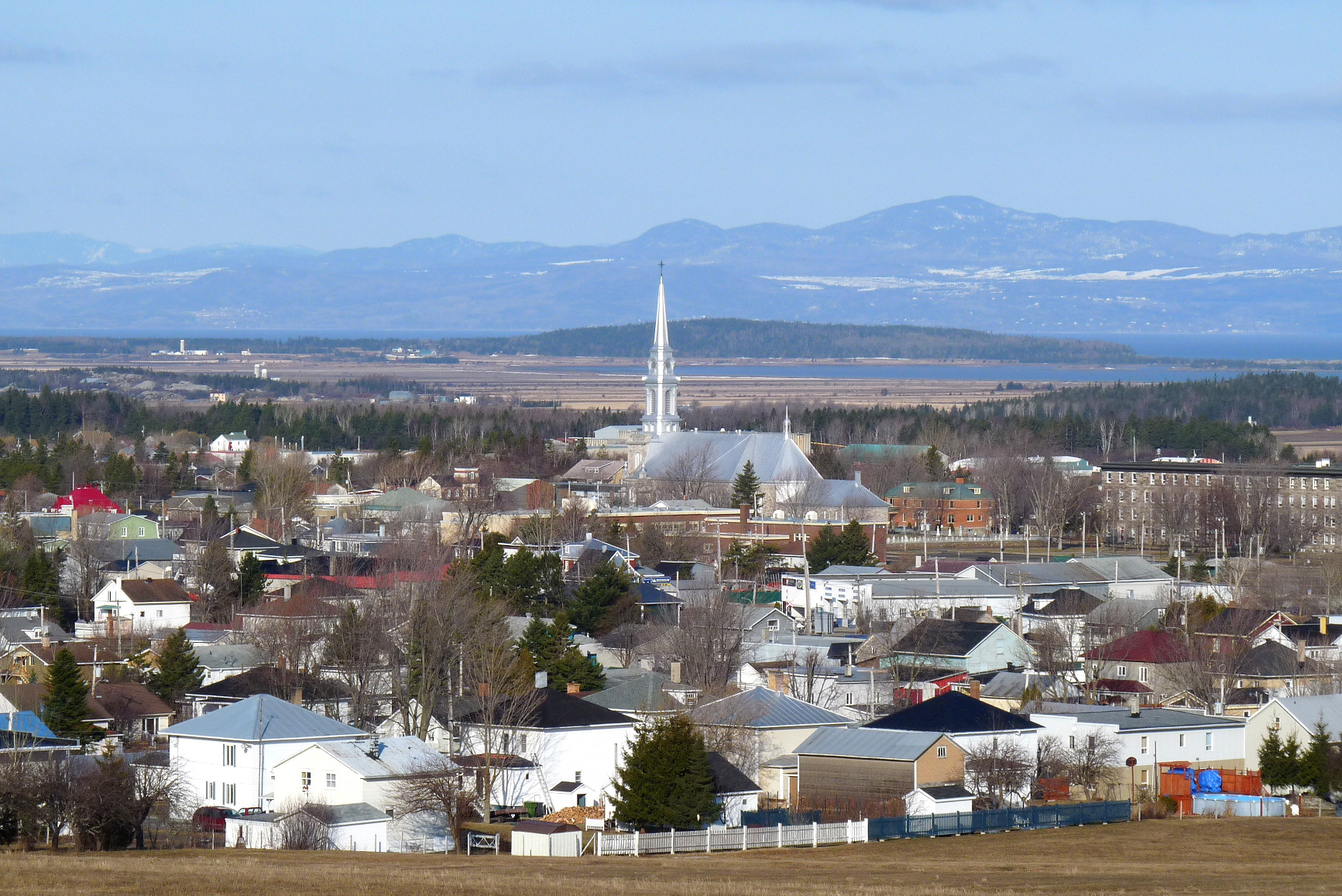

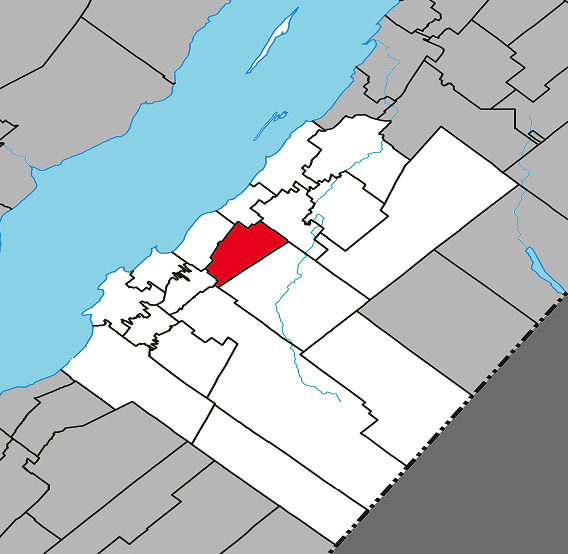
- Location within Kamouraska RCM

- Location in eastern Quebec
- Coordinates: 47°32′N 69°48′W
- Country: Canada
- Province: Quebec
- Region: Bas-Saint-Laurent
- RCM: Kamouraska
- Constituted: March 1, 2000

Government
  - Mayor: Solange Morneau
  - Federal riding: Côte-du-Sud—Rivière-du-Loup—Kataskomiq—Témiscouata
  - Prov. riding: Côte-du-Sud

Area
  - City: 60.20 km^{2} (23.24 sq mi)
  - Land: 59.68 km^{2} (23.04 sq mi)
  - Urban: 3.35 km^{2} (1.29 sq mi)

Population (2021)
  - City: 3,530
  - Density: 59.1/km^{2} (153/sq mi)
  - Urban: 2,534
  - Urban density: 756/km^{2} (1,960/sq mi)
  - Pop 2016-2021: ▲1.8%
  - Dwellings: 1,635
- Time zone: UTC−5 (EST)
  - Summer (DST): UTC−4 (EDT)
- Postal code(s): G0L 3Y0
- Area codes: 418 and 581
- Highways A-20 (TCH): R-230
- Website: www.villesaintpascal.com

Saint-Pascal (French pronunciation: [sɛ̃ paskal]) is a city in Kamouraska Regional County Municipality in the Bas-Saint-Laurent region of Quebec. It has a population of 3,530. It is the second biggest city in the RCM, after La Pocatière. The city is crossed by the Kamouraska River. It is also the county seat of the Kamouraska RCM.

Saint-Pascal was named in honour of Paschal Taché, seigneur of Kamouraska. The original spelling of the municipality, based on the Latin Paschalis, was given in honour of Étienne-Paschal Taché, a notary and militia lieutenant-colonel. In November 1813, he became co-seigneur of Kamouraska with his father, Paschal-Jacques. On his father's death, he assumed sole ownership of the seigneury.

== History ==
The original municipality of Saint-Paschal-de-Kamouraska was officially established in 1855 as a parish municipality but it was in 1939 that the city of Saint-Pascal (then a village) was create as it separated from the more rural Saint-Paschal-de-Kamouraska. In 1957, the municipality of Saint-Paschal-de-Kamouraska changed its name to Saint-Pascal also. In 1966, the village of Saint-Pascal became the city of Saint-Pascal. In 2000, the municipality of Saint-Pascal was finally annexed by the city of Saint-Pascal.

== Demographics ==
In the 2021 Census of Population conducted by Statistics Canada, Saint-Pascal had a population of 3,530 living in 1,559 of its 1,635 total private dwellings, a change of 1.8% from its 2016 population of 3,468. With a land area of 59.68 km^{2} (23.04 sq mi), it had a population density of 59.1/km^{2} (153.2/sq mi) in 2021.

== Government ==
- Mayor: Solange Morneau
- Councillors: Isabelle Chouinard, Josée Chouinard, François Gagné‑Bérubé, Caroline Hudon, Francis Ouellet, Alain Potvin

== Notable people ==
- Annie St-Pierre, film director and producer
- Jacques Martin, NHL head coach

== See also ==
- List of cities in Quebec
