= Quebec Route 230 =

Highway in Quebec, Canada

Route 230

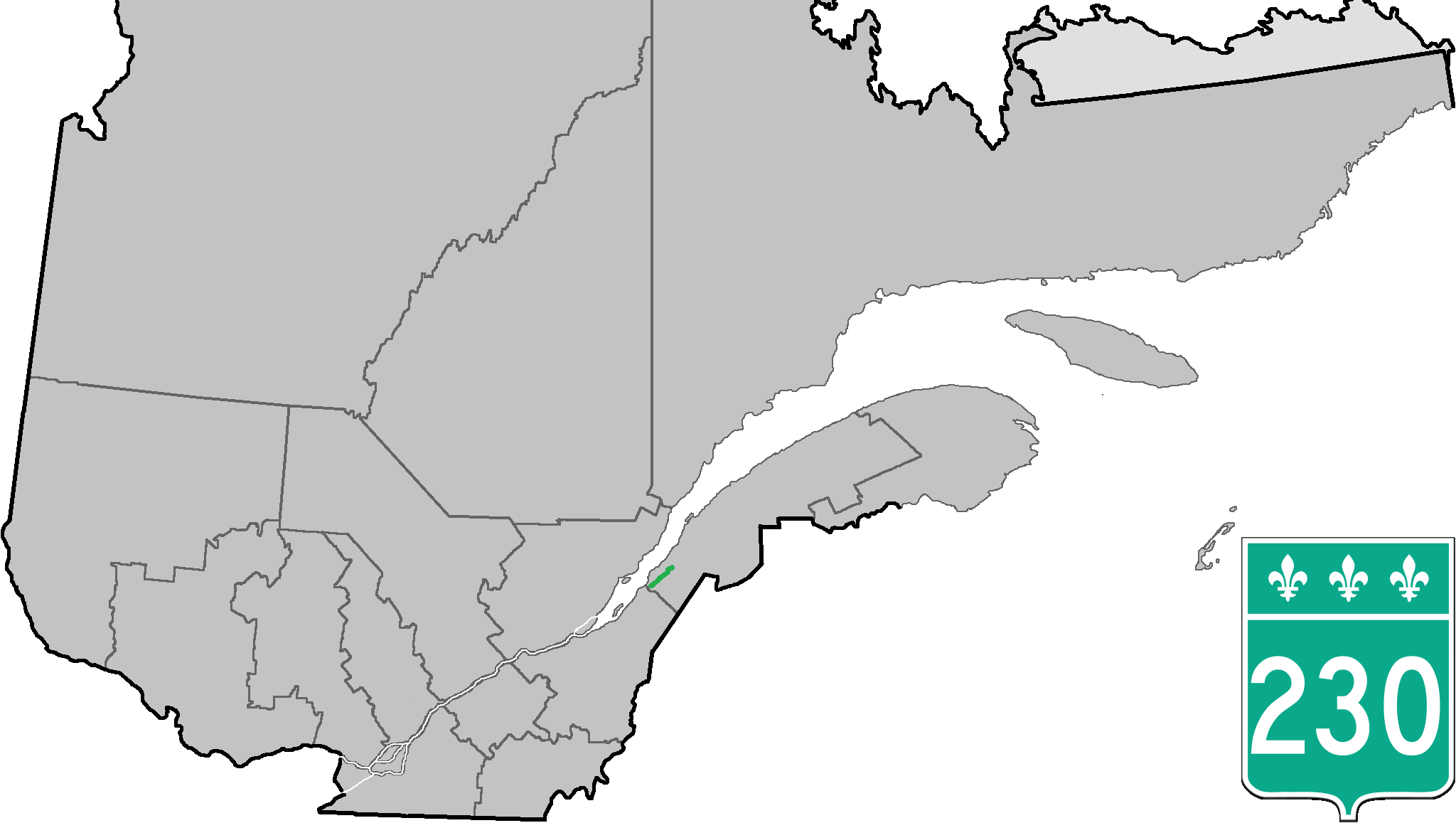

Route information
- Maintained by Transports Québec
- Length: 53.1 km (33.0 mi)

Major junctions
- West end: R-132 in La Pocatière
- A-20 (TCH) / R-287 in Saint-Philippe-de-Néri; R-289 in Saint-Alexandre-de-Kamouraska
- East end: Saint-Alexandre-de-Kamouraska

Location
- Country: Canada
- Province: Quebec
- Major cities: La Pocatière, Saint-Pascal

Highway system
- Quebec provincial highways; Autoroutes; List; Former
← R-229	→ R-231

Route 230 is a two-lane east/west provincial highway on the south shore of the Saint Lawrence River in the Bas-Saint-Laurent region of Eastern Quebec, Canada. Its eastern terminus is in Saint-Alexandre-de-Kamouraska east of the junction of Route 289 and the western terminus is at the junction of Route 132 in La Pocatière.

== Municipalities along Route 230 ==
- La Pocatière
- Rivière-Ouelle
- Saint-Pacôme
- Saint-Philippe-de-Néri
- Saint-Pascal
- Sainte-Hélène-de-Kamouraska
- Saint-André-de-Kamouraska
- Saint-Alexandre-de-Kamouraska
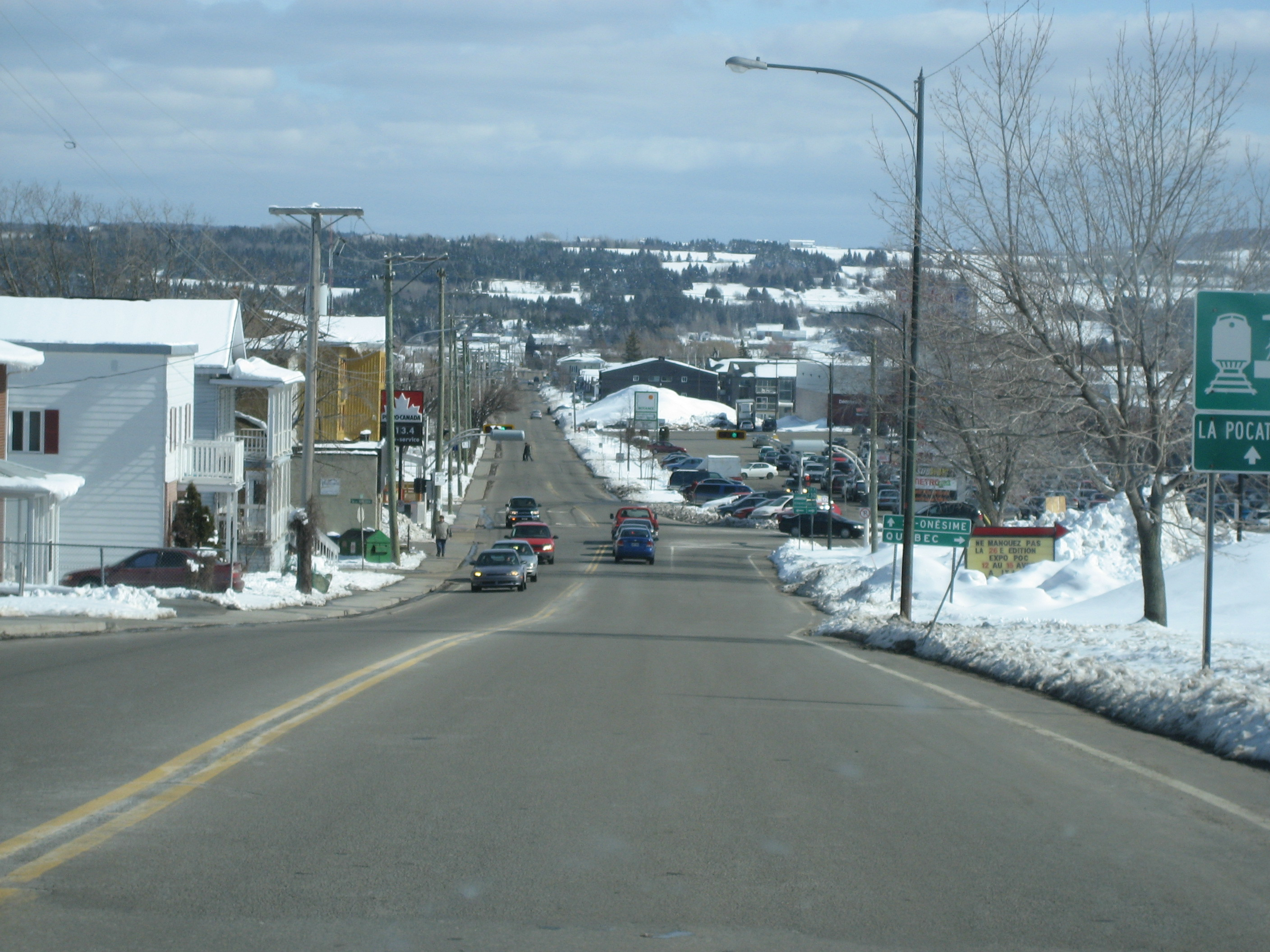
Route 230 western end is located in La Pocatière, west of downtown.

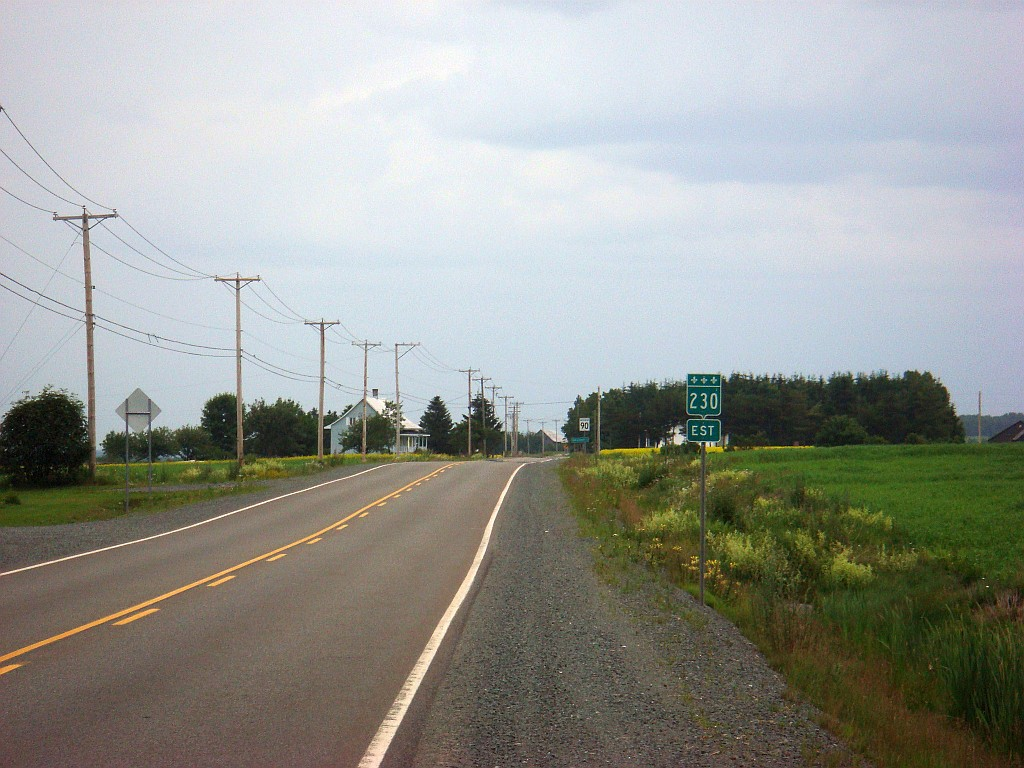
Quebec Route 230 in Saint-Pascal.

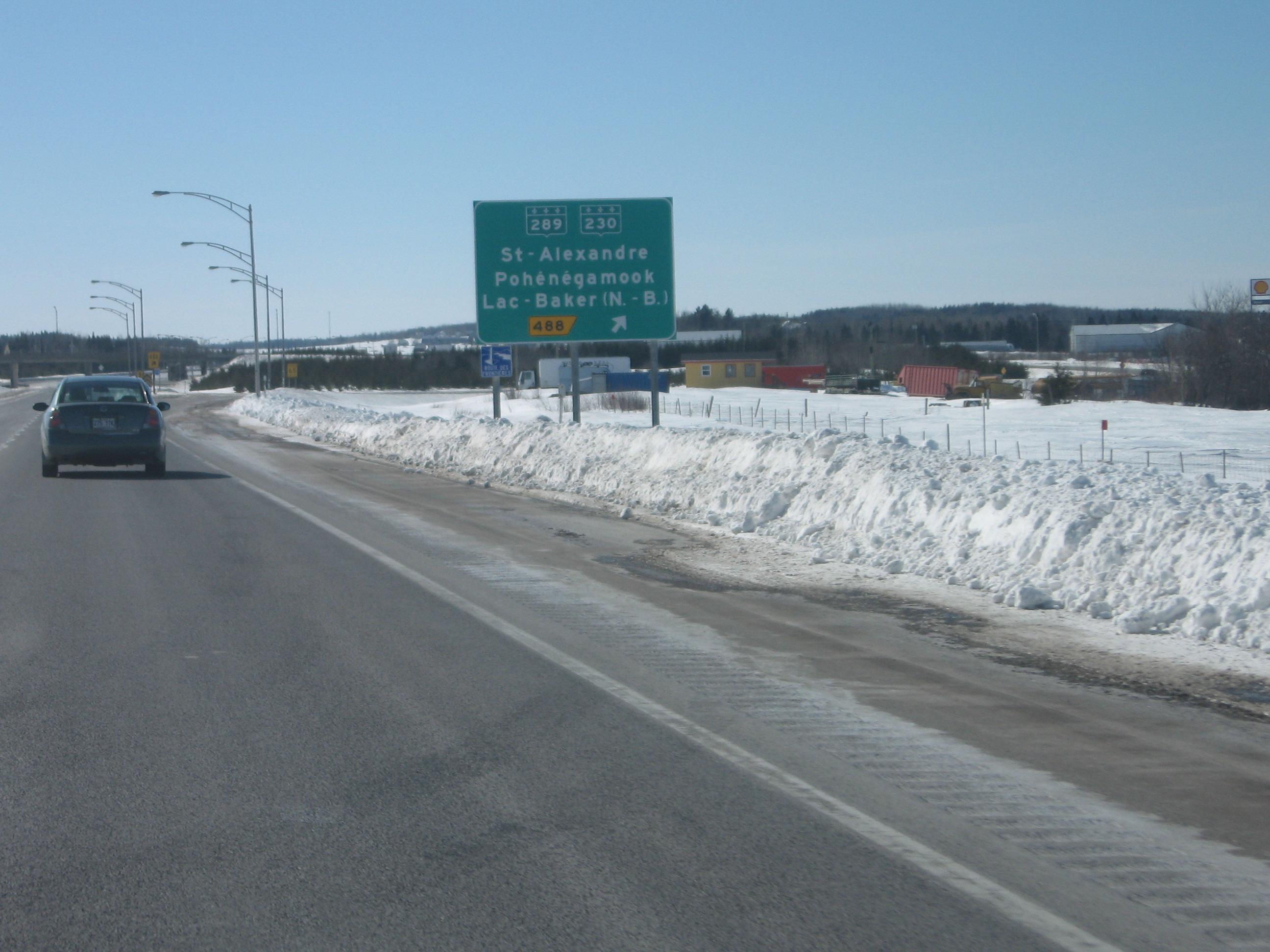
Eastern end of Route 230 is located at its junction with Route 289, near Autoroute 20.

== See also ==
- List of Quebec provincial highways
