= Saint-Alexandre-de-Kamouraska =

- Municipality
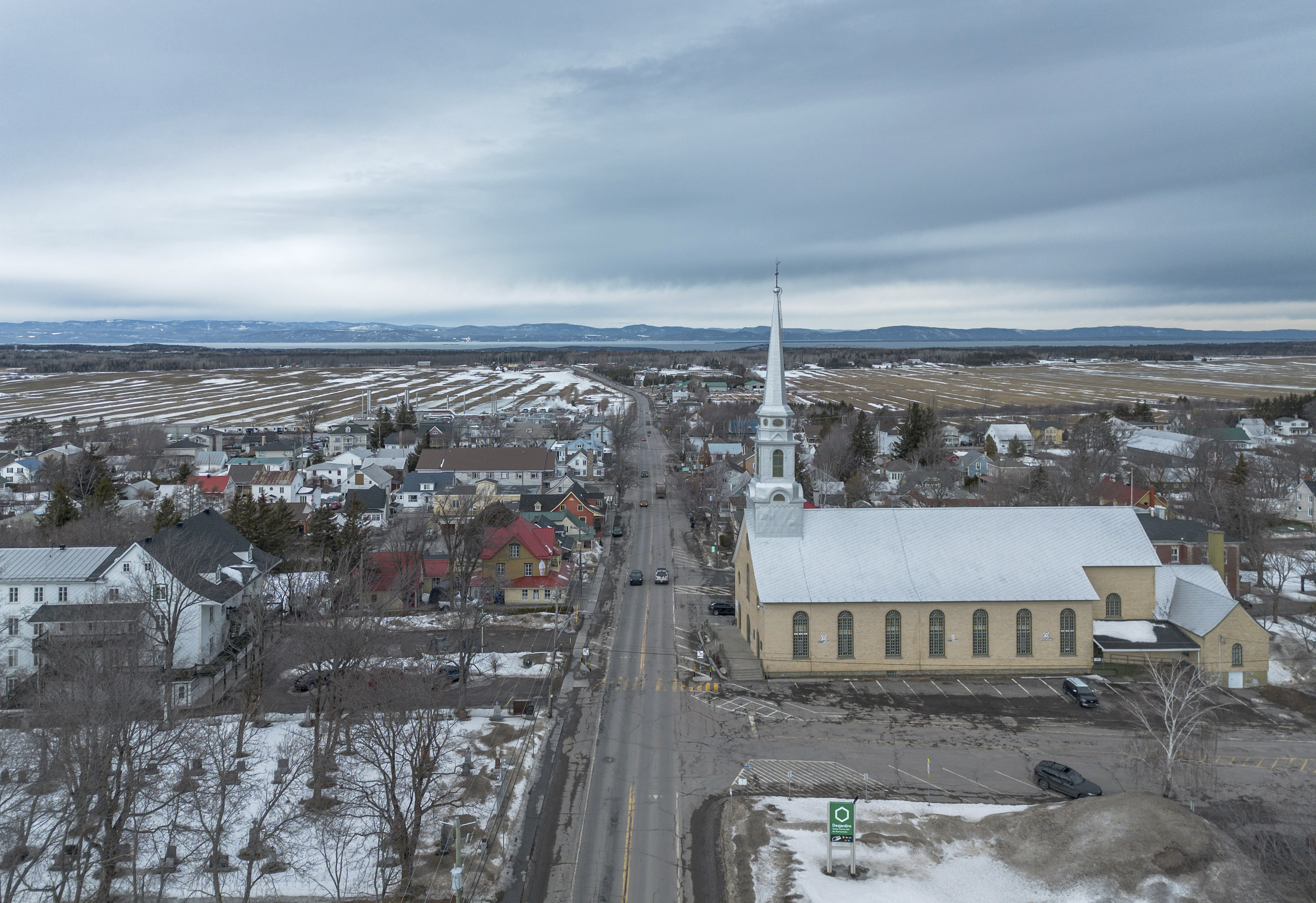
- Saint-Alexandre-de-Kamouraska in 2026

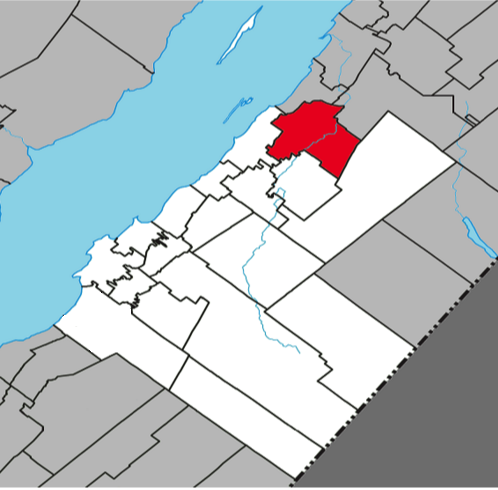
- Location within Kamouraska RCM

- Location in eastern Quebec
- Coordinates: 47°40′54″N 69°37′30″W
- Country: Canada
- Province: Quebec
- Region: Bas-Saint-Laurent
- RCM: Kamouraska
- Constituted: July 1, 1855

Government
  - Mayor: Nicolas Bradette
  - Federal riding: Côte-du-Sud—Rivière-du-Loup—Kataskomiq—Témiscouata
  - Prov. riding: Côte-du-Sud

Area
  - Total: 116.50 km^{2} (44.98 sq mi)
  - Land: 111.40 km^{2} (43.01 sq mi)

Population (2021)
  - Total: 2,255
  - Density: 20.2/km^{2} (52/sq mi)
  - Pop 2016–2021: ▲6.9%
  - Dwellings: 927
- Time zone: UTC−5 (EST)
  - Summer (DST): UTC−4 (EDT)
- Postal code(s): G0L 2G0
- Area codes: 418 and 581
- Highways A-20 (TCH): R-230; R-289
- Website: www.stalexkamouraska.com

Saint-Alexandre-de-Kamouraska (French pronunciation: [sɛ̃t‿alɛksɑ̃dʁ də kamuʁaska]) is a municipality in the Canadian province of Quebec, in the Kamouraska Regional County Municipality.

Before July 5, 1997, it was known simply as Saint-Alexandre.

== History ==
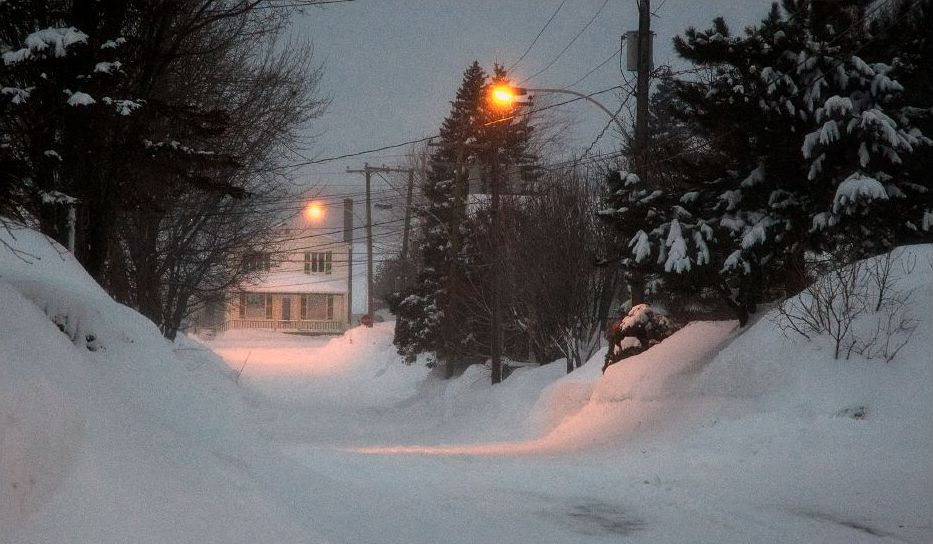
Winter 2011 in Saint-Alexandre

The parish of Saint-Alexandre was founded in the first half of the 19th century. It was canonically erected in 1851. The post office was first opened in 1854 under the name "Saint-Alexandre-de-Kamouraska". The parish municipality of Saint-Alexandre was then created in 1855. In 1997, its status was changed to a municipality alongside its name, which became Saint-Alexandre-de-Kamouraska.

=== 1968 derailment ===
On January 27, 1968, the westbound Scotian passenger train operated by Canadian National Railway derailed near the Saint-Alexandre-de-Kamouraska station. Two passengers were injured. The train was operating at about 65 miles per hour (105 km/h) when an axle on the locomotive broke.

== Geography ==
=== Lakes and rivers ===
The following waterways pass through or are situated within the municipality's boundaries:

- Lac Morin (47°37′23″N 69°32′08″W) – located along the municipality's southern border.
- Le Petit Lac (47°40′10″N 69°33′41″W)
- Petite rivière Noire (47°41′38″N 69°32′33″W)
- Rivière Carrier (47°40′11″N 69°30′42″W)
- Rivière Fourchue (47°41′19″N 69°32′31″W)

== Demographics ==
=== Population ===
Canada census – Saint-Alexandre-de-Kamouraska community profile

	2021	2016	2011
Population	2,255 (+6.9% from 2016)	2,109 (-2.9% from 2011)	2,050 (+9.0% from 2006)
Land area	111.40 km^{2} (43.01 sq mi)	111.31 km^{2} (42.98 sq mi)	111.49 km^{2} (43.05 sq mi)
Population density	20.2/km^{2} (52/sq mi)	18.9/km^{2} (49/sq mi)	18.4/km^{2} (48/sq mi)
Median age	42.4 (M: 42.8, F: 42.0)	42.6 (M: 41.5, F: 44.5)	41.6 (M: 41.1, F: 42.4)
Private dwellings	927 (total)	912 (total)	870 (total)
Median household income	$73,500	$61,056	$51,157

References: 2021 2016 2011

Historical Census Data - Saint-Alexandre-de-Kamouraska, Quebec
Year	Pop.	±%
1861	1,735	—
1871	1,763	+1.6%
1881	1,758	−0.3%
1891	1,741	−1.0%
1901	1,760	+1.1%
1911	2,011	+14.3%
1921	1,889	−6.1%
1931	1,876	−0.7%
1941	2,023	+7.8%
1951	2,064	+2.0%
1956	2,046	−0.9%
1961	2,044	−0.1%
1966	1,949	−4.6%
1971	1,843	−5.4%
1976	1,845	+0.1%
1981	1,885	+2.2%
1986	1,916	+1.6%
1991	1,827	−4.6%
1996	1,807	−1.1%
2001	1,849	+2.3%
2006	1,880	+1.7%
2011	2,050	+9.0%
2016	2,109	+2.9%
2021	2,255	+6.9%

=== Language ===
Mother tongue (2021):

- English as first language: 1.0%
- French as first language: 96.4%
- English and French as first languages: 0.0%
- Other as first language: 2.4%

== Notable people ==
- Normand Laprise : Chef

== See also ==
- List of municipalities in Quebec
