= Kamouraska Regional County Municipality =

Kamouraska
- Regional county municipality
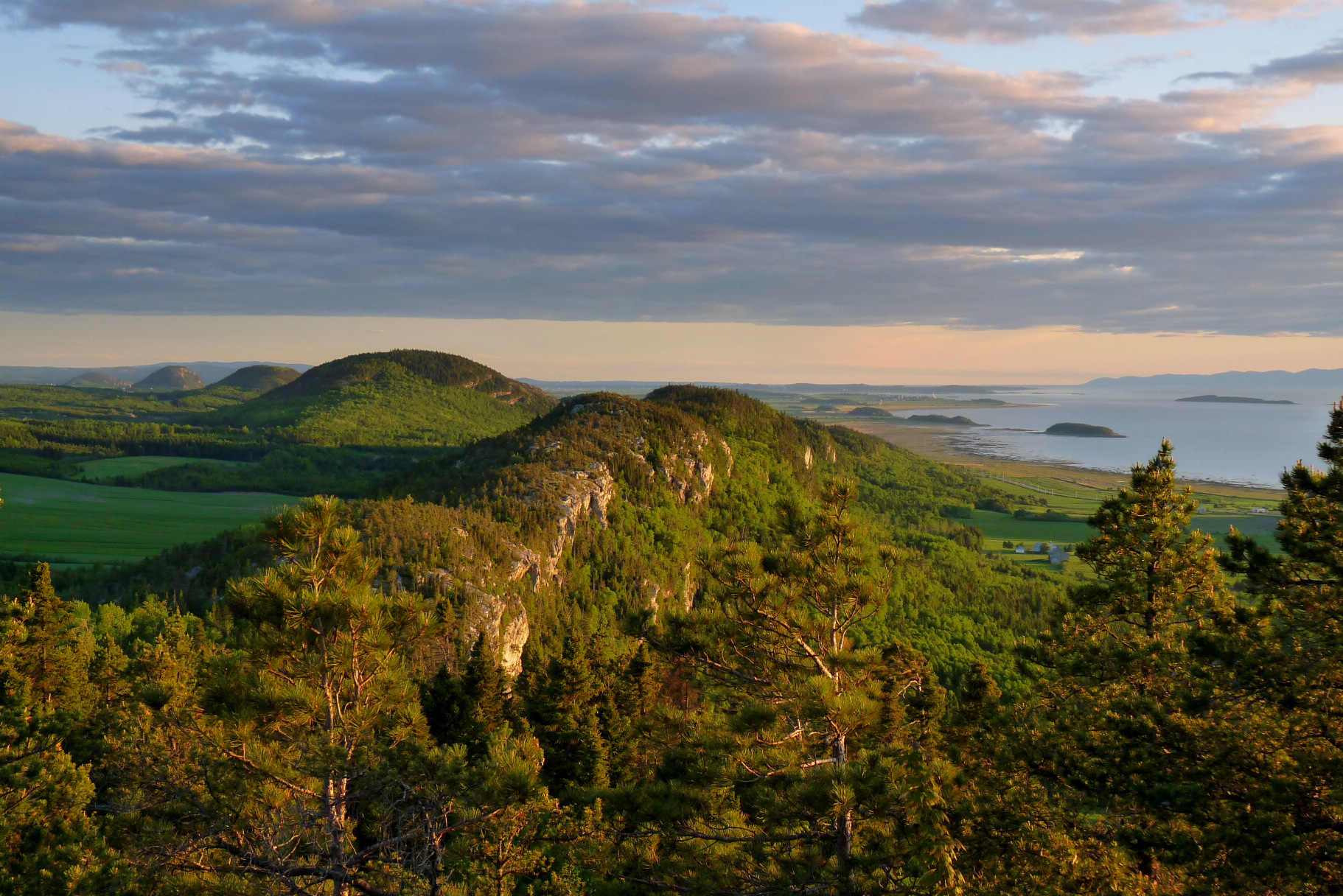
- Inselbergs in Saint-André-de-Kamouraska.

- Coordinates: 47°32′N 69°49′W
- Country: Canada
- Province: Quebec
- Region: Bas-Saint-Laurent
- Effective: January 1, 1982
- County seat: Saint-Pascal

Government
  - Type: Prefecture
  - Prefect: Nancy Dubé

Area
  - Total: 2,603.70 km^{2} (1,005.29 sq mi)
  - Land: 2,244.73 km^{2} (866.70 sq mi)

Population (2016)
  - Total: 21,073
  - Density: 9.4/km^{2} (24/sq mi)
  - Change 2011-2016: ▼1.9%
  - Dwellings: 10,645
- Time zone: UTC−5 (EST)
  - Summer (DST): UTC−4 (EDT)
- Area codes: 418 and 581
- Website: mrckamouraska.com

Kamouraska (French pronunciation: [kamuʁaska]) is a regional county municipality in eastern Quebec, Canada. The regional county municipality seat is Saint-Pascal, but the largest town is La Pocatière.

The area is an important research, development and education centre for agriculture. Factories in the region produce metal products and public transportation equipment. One of the people instrumental in settling and developing this area was Pascal Taché, an early seigneur.

The name "Kamouraska" comes from an Algonquin word meaning "where rushes grow at the water's edge".

== Geography ==
=== Adjacent counties and municipalities ===
- Rivière-du-Loup Regional County Municipality – northeast
- Témiscouata Regional County Municipality – east
- Aroostook County, Maine – southeast
- L'Islet Regional County Municipality, Quebec – southwest

== Subdivisions ==
There are 17 subdivisions within the RCM:

Cities & Towns (2)

- La Pocatière
- Saint-Pascal

Municipalities (11)

- Kamouraska
- Mont-Carmel
- Rivière-Ouelle
- Saint-Alexandre-de-Kamouraska
- Saint-André-de-Kamouraska
- Saint-Bruno-de-Kamouraska
- Saint-Denis-De La Bouteillerie
- Sainte-Hélène-de-Kamouraska
- Saint-Gabriel-Lalemant
- Saint-Germain-de-Kamouraska
- Saint-Pacôme

Parishes (2)

- Saint-Joseph-de-Kamouraska
- Saint-Philippe-de-Néri

Unorganized Territory (2)

- Petit-Lac-Sainte-Anne
- Picard

== Transportation ==
=== Access routes ===
Highways and numbered routes that run through the municipality, including external routes that start or finish at the county border:

- Autoroutes
  - A-20 (TCH)
- Principal Highways
  - R-132
- Secondary Highways
  - R-230
  - R-287
  - R-289
- External Routes
  - None

== See also ==
- List of regional county municipalities and equivalent territories in Quebec
