= Sainte-Hélène-de-Kamouraska =

- Municipality
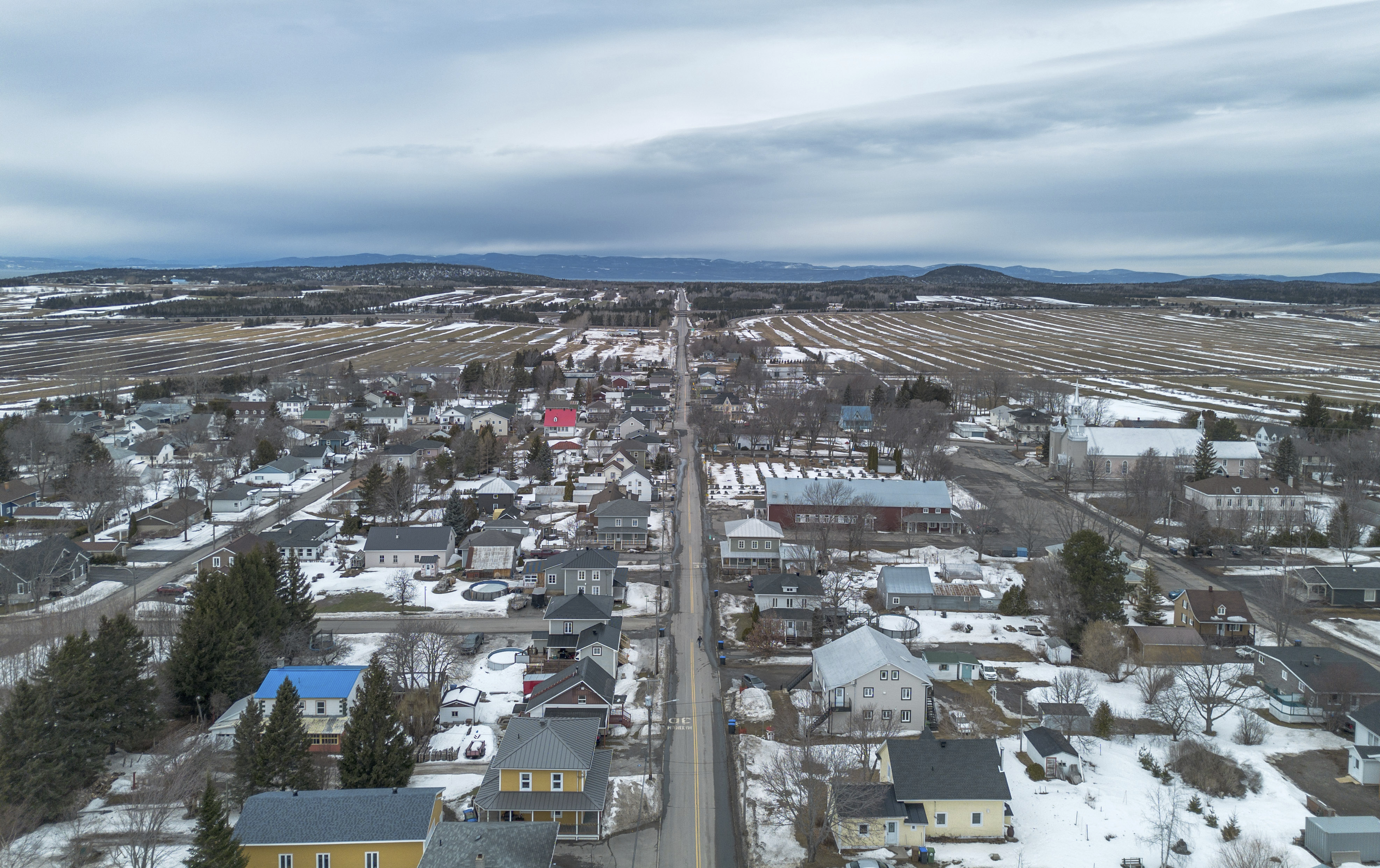
- Sainte-Hélène-de-Kamouraska in 2026

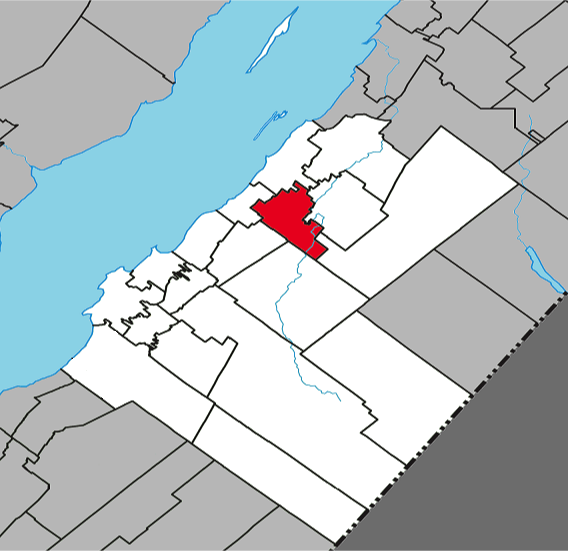
- Location within Kamouraska RCM

- Location in eastern Quebec
- Coordinates: 47°36′N 69°44′W
- Country: Canada
- Province: Quebec
- Region: Bas-Saint-Laurent
- RCM: Kamouraska
- Constituted: July 1, 1855

Government
  - Mayor: Annie Lavasseur
  - Federal riding: Côte-du-Sud—Rivière-du-Loup—Kataskomiq—Témiscouata
  - Prov. riding: Côte-du-Sud

Area
  - Total: 60.60 km^{2} (23.40 sq mi)
  - Land: 60.46 km^{2} (23.34 sq mi)

Population (2021)
  - Total: 891
  - Density: 14.7/km^{2} (38/sq mi)
  - Pop 2016-2021: ▼2.9%
  - Dwellings: 410
- Time zone: UTC−5 (EST)
  - Summer (DST): UTC−4 (EDT)
- Postal code(s): G0L 3J0
- Area codes: 418 and 581
- Highways A-20 (TCH): R-230
- Website: sainte-helene.net

Sainte-Hélène-de-Kamouraska (French pronunciation: [sɛ̃t‿elɛn də kamuʁaska]) is a municipality in the Canadian province of Quebec, located in the Kamouraska Regional County Municipality.

Until September 13, 2014, it was officially known simply as Sainte-Hélène.

== Demographics ==
In the 2021 Census of Population conducted by Statistics Canada, Sainte-Hélène-de-Kamouraska had a population of 891 living in 382 of its 410 total private dwellings, a change of −2.9% from its 2016 population of 918. With a land area of 60.46 km^{2} (23.34 sq mi), it had a population density of 14.7/km^{2} (38.2/sq mi) in 2021.

== Government ==
=== Municipal council ===
- Mayor: Annie Lavasseur
- Councillors: Paul Thériault, Joël Landry, Marc Landry, Claude Lévesque, Steeve Santerre, Cynthia Ouellet

== See also ==
- List of municipalities in Quebec
