= Saint-André-de-Kamouraska =

- Municipality
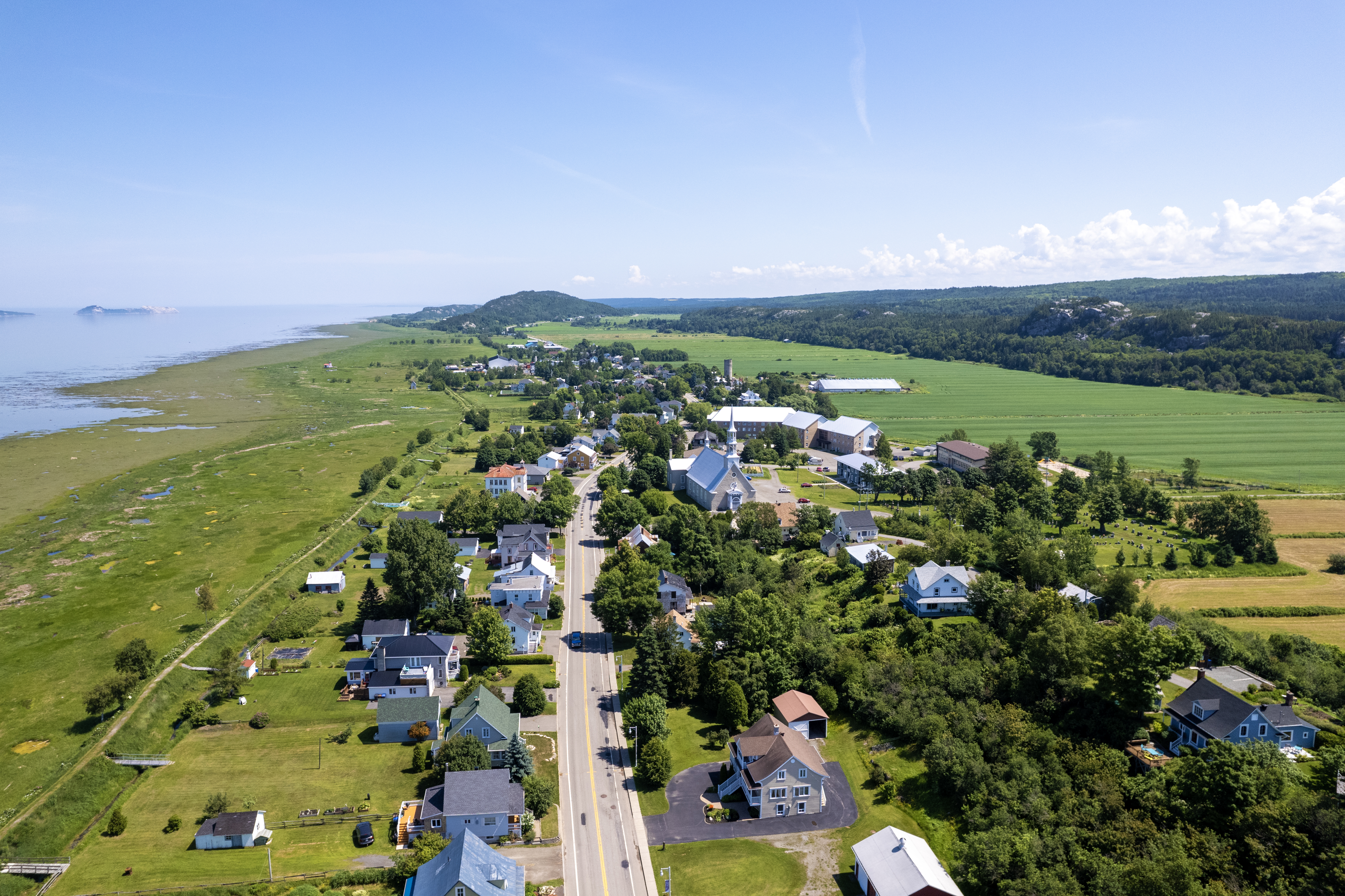
- Aerial view of Saint-André-de-Kamouraska

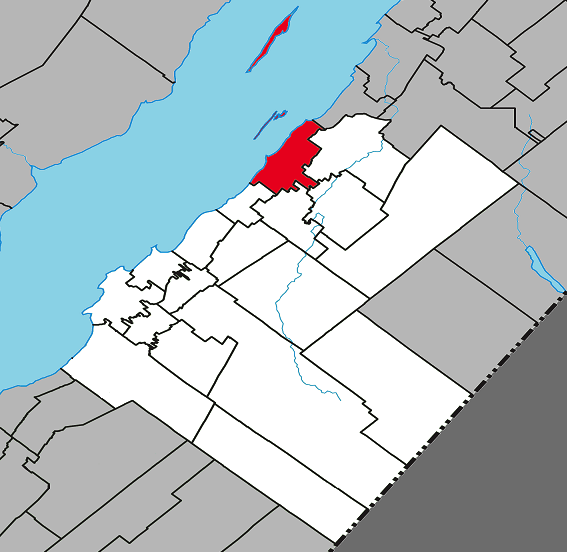
- Location within Kamouraska RCM

- Location in eastern Quebec
- Coordinates: 47°41′N 69°44′W
- Country: Canada
- Province: Quebec
- Region: Bas-Saint-Laurent
- RCM: Kamouraska
- Constituted: February 14, 1987

Government
  - Mayor: Chantal Parenteau
  - Federal riding: Côte-du-Sud—Rivière-du-Loup—Kataskomiq—Témiscouata
  - Prov. riding: Côte-du-Sud

Area
  - Total: 70.60 km^{2} (27.26 sq mi)
  - Land: 71.06 km^{2} (27.44 sq mi)
- There is an apparent contradiction between two authoritative sources

Population (2021)
  - Total: 658
  - Density: 9.3/km^{2} (24/sq mi)
  - Pop 2016-2021: 0.0%
  - Dwellings: 276
- Time zone: UTC−5 (EST)
  - Summer (DST): UTC−4 (EDT)
- Postal code(s): G0L 2H0
- Area codes: 418 and 581
- Highways A-20 (TCH): R-132; R-230; R-289
- Website: www.standre dekamouraska.ca

Saint-André-de-Kamouraska (French pronunciation: [sɛ̃t‿ɑ̃dʁe də kamuʁaska]) is a municipality in the Canadian province of Quebec, located in the Kamouraska Regional County Municipality. Before 2020, it was known as Saint-André.

== History ==
The catholic parish of Saint-André de L'Islet-du-Portage, located at the height of the Pèlerins, a group of islands in the St. Lawrence River about 3 km offshore, was canonically erected in 1791. On the municipal level, the parish municipality of Saint-André and the village municipality of Andréville - detached from the parish municipality - came into being in 1855 and 1903 respectively, merging in 1987 to create the current municipality of Saint-André.

In 2020, the municipality of Saint-André changed its name to the current Saint-André-de-Kamouraska.

== Geography ==
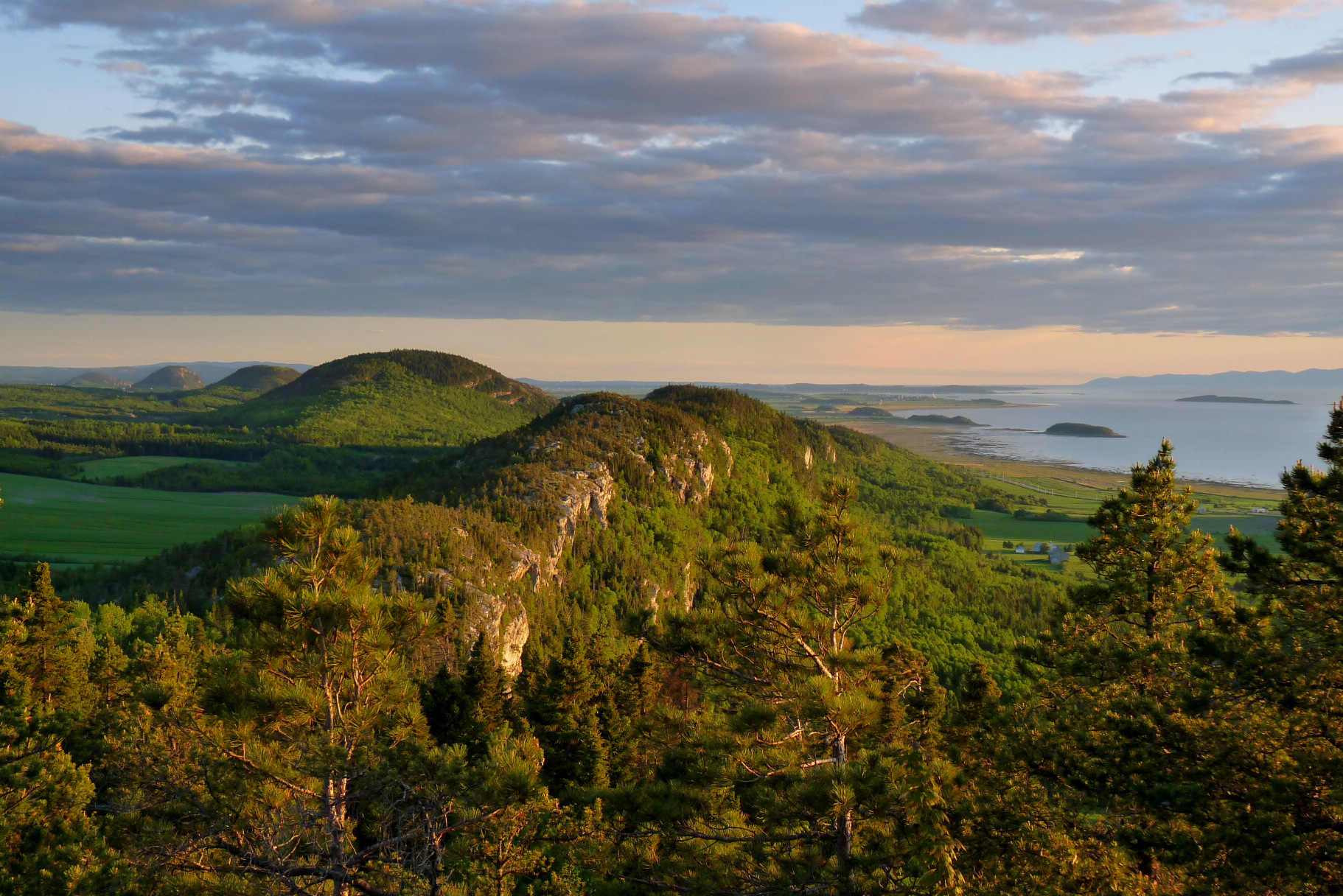
Landscape near Saint Lawrence River in Saint-André-de-Kamouraska

Saint-André-de-Kamouraska is located on the southern shoreline of the Saint Lawrence River along with several islands belonging to the municipality situated offshore to the north.

=== Communities ===
The following locations reside within the municipality's boundaries:

- Saint-André (47°40′33″N 69°43′29″W)
- Saint-André-Station (47°37′49″N 69°41′09″W) – a hamlet in the southeast part of the municipality

=== Lakes and rivers ===
The following waterways pass through or are situated within the municipality's boundaries:

- Rivière des Caps (Mouth:47°43′21″N 69°40′35″W)
- Rivière Fouquette (Mouth:47°42′04″N 69°42′09″W)

== Demographics ==
Historical census populations – Saint-André-de-Kamouraska

Year	Pop.	±%
1991	687	—
1996	598	−13.0%
2001	634	+6.0%
2006	618	−2.5%

Year	Pop.	±%
2011	651	+5.3%
2016	658	+1.1%
2021	658	+0.0%

Source: Statistics Canada

Private dwellings occupied by usual residents: 253 (out of 276 total)

== Government ==
- Mayor: Chantal Parenteau

== See also ==
- Saguenay–St. Lawrence Marine Park
- Île aux Lièvres (Saint Lawrence River)
- List of municipalities in Quebec
