= Montmagny-L'Islet (electoral district) =

Former provincial electoral district in Quebec, Canada

Quebec electoral district

Defunct provincial electoral district
- Legislature: National Assembly of Quebec
- District created: 1972
- District abolished: 2011
- First contested: 1973
- Last contested: 2008

Demographics
- Population (2006): 40,460
- Electors (2008): 32,006
- Area (km²): 3,695.81
- Census division(s): L'Islet, Montmagny
- Census subdivision(s): Berthier-sur-Mer, Cap-Saint-Ignace, Lac-Frontière, L'Islet, Montmagny, Notre-Dame-du-Rosaire, Saint-Adalbert, Saint-Antoine-de-l'Isle-aux-Grues, Saint-Aubert, Saint-Cyrille-de-Lessard, Saint-Damase-de-L'Islet, Sainte-Apolline-de-Patton, Sainte-Euphémie-sur-Rivière-du-Sud, Sainte-Félicité, Sainte-Lucie-de-Beauregard, Sainte-Perpétue, Saint-Fabien-de-Panet, Saint-François-de-la-Rivière-du-Sud, Saint-Jean-Port-Joli, Saint-Just-de-Bretenières, Saint-Marcel, Saint-Omer, Saint-Pamphile, Saint-Paul-de-Montminy, Saint-Pierre-de-la-Rivière-du-Sud, Tourville

Montmagny-L'Islet (French pronunciation: [mɔ̃maɲi lilɛ]) is a former provincial electoral district in the Chaudière-Appalaches region of Quebec, Canada, that elected members to the National Assembly of Quebec. As of its final election, it included the cities or municipalities of Montmagny, Saint-Jean-Port-Joli, L'Islet, Sainte-Perpétue, Saint-Pamphile, and Cap-Saint-Ignace.

It was created for the 1973 election from Montmagny and a part of L'Islet. Its final election was in 2008. It disappeared in the 2012 election and the successor electoral district was Côte-du-Sud.

Its territory never changed during its entire existence, despite overall electoral map reforms in 1980, 1985, 1988, 1992 and 2001.

== Members of the National Assembly ==
Legislature	Years	Member	Party
Riding created from Montmagny and L'Islet
30th	1973–1976	Julien Giasson	Liberal
31st	1976–1981	Julien Giasson	Liberal
32nd	1981–1985	Jacques LeBlanc	Parti Québécois
33rd	1985–1989	Réal Gauvin	Liberal
34th	1989–1994	Réal Gauvin	Liberal
35th	1994–1998	Réal Gauvin	Liberal
36th	1998–2003	Réal Gauvin	Liberal
37th	2003–2007	Norbert Morin	Liberal
38th	2007–2008	Claude Roy	Action démocratique
39th	2008–2012	Norbert Morin	Liberal
Riding dissolved into Côte-du-Sud

== Election results ==
2008 Quebec general election
Party	Candidate	Votes	%	±%
Liberal	Norbert Morin	10,027	51.78	+13.59
Action démocratique	Claude Roy (politician)	5,632	29.08	-14.27
Parti Québécois	Guy Belanger	3,058	15.79	+0.60
Green	Richard Piper	356	1.84	-0.08
Québec solidaire	Bernard Beaulieu	293	1.51	+0.17

2007 Quebec general election
Party	Candidate	Votes	%	±%
Action démocratique	Claude Roy (politician)	10,022	43.35	+6.53
Liberal	Norbert Morin	8,829	38.19	-2.98
Parti Québécois	Réjean Boulet	3,512	15.19	-5.84
Green	Richard Piper	445	1.92	-
Québec solidaire	Yvon Léveillé	310	1.34	+0.37*

* Increase is from UFP

2003 Quebec general election
Party	Candidate	Votes	%	±%
Liberal	Norbert Morin	9,518	41.17	-4.82
Action démocratique	Mario Dolan	8,513	36.82	+21.29
Parti Québécois	Louise Soucy	4,863	21.03	-17.45
UFP	Fernand Dorval	225	0.97	-

1998 Quebec general election
Party	Candidate	Votes	%	±%
Liberal	Réal Gauvin	11,047	45.99	+1.63
Parti Québécois	Mario Cantin	9,242	38.48	-2.21
Action démocratique	Frédéric Gagné	3,729	15.53	-

1995 Quebec referendum
Side	Votes	%
Non	15,173	55.11
Oui	12,360	44.89

1994 Quebec general election
Party	Candidate	Votes	%	±%
Liberal	Réal Gauvin	10,339	44.36	-13.39
Parti Québécois	Daniel Blanchet	9,484	40.69	+4.85
Independent	Jean-Claude Roy	2,605	11.18	-
New Democrat	Gaston Bourget	881	3.78	-

1992 Charlottetown Accord referendum
Side	Votes	%
Non	13,145	57.83
Oui	9,586	42.17

1989 Quebec general election
Party	Candidate	Votes	%	±%
Liberal	Réal Gauvin	12,688	57.75	-2.77
Parti Québécois	Daniel Blanchet	7,874	35.84	+1.83
Green	André Blouin	1,407	6.40	-

1985 Quebec general election
Party	Candidate	Votes	%	±%
Liberal	Réal Gauvin	14,492	60.52	+15.92
Parti Québécois	Jacques Leblanc	8,143	34.01	-11.49
New Democrat	Louise Saint-Pierre	564	2.35	-
Independent	Antonio Cicchetti	500	2.09	-
Parti indépendantiste	Alain Raby	199	0.83	-
Christian socialist	Réjean Tardif	47	0.20	-

1981 Quebec general election
Party	Candidate	Votes	%	±%
Parti Québécois	Jacques Leblanc	11,797	45.50	+17.69
Liberal	Julien Giasson	11,566	44.60	+7.16
Union Nationale	Jean-Pierre Caron	2,566	9.90	-17.91

1980 Quebec referendum
Side	Votes	%
Non	16,348	61.92
Oui	10,052	38.08

1976 Quebec general election
Party	Candidate	Votes	%	±%
Liberal	Julien Giasson	9,220	37.44	-14.44
Union Nationale	André Rousseau	6,850	27.81	+1.42
Parti Québécois	Maurice Chouinard	6,849	27.81	+16.24
Ralliement créditiste	Clermont Avoine	1,710	6.94	-3.22

1973 Quebec general election
Party	Candidate	Votes	%
Liberal	Julien Giasson	11,375	51.88
Union Nationale	Jean-Paul Cloutier	5,787	26.39
Parti Québécois	Georges Caron	2,538	11.57
Parti créditiste	Yvon-C. Roy	2,227	10.16

== See also ==
- List of Quebec provincial electoral districts
- Canadian provincial electoral districts
