= Candidates of the 2022 Quebec general election =

- October 3, 2022

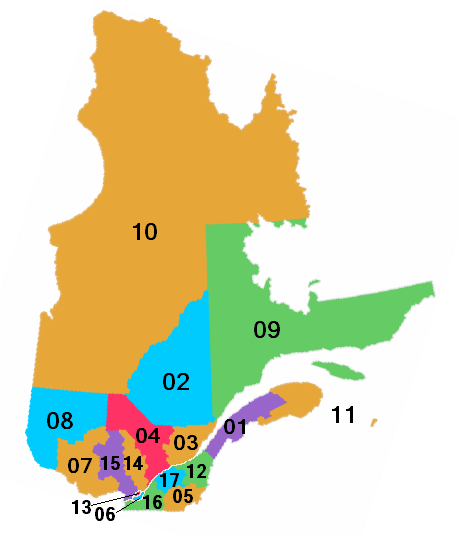
Quebec regions

The following tables list by region the candidates for the 2022 Quebec general election.

== Number of candidates by party ==
Nominated candidates for the 2022 Quebec general election 125 seats in the National Assembly of Quebec
Party	Leader	Candidates
Coalition Avenir Québec	François Legault	125
Quebec Liberal Party	Dominique Anglade	125
Parti Québécois	Paul St-Pierre Plamondon	125
Québec solidaire	Gabriel Nadeau-Dubois (Note: The leader of Québec solidaire is Nicolas Chatel-Launay, however, Nadeau-Dubois was the party's candidate for Premier.)	125 (Note: This number includes withdrawn candidate Marie-Eve Rancourt.)
Conservative Party of Quebec	Éric Duhaime	125
Green Party of Québec	Alex Tyrrell	73
Climat Québec	Martine Ouellet	54
Démocratie directe	Jean Charles Cléroux	28
Canadian Party of Québec	Colin Standish	20
Bloc Montréal	Balarama Holness	13
Marxist–Leninist Party of Quebec	Pierre Chenier	12
Équipe autonomiste	Stéphane Pouleur	10
L'union fait la force	Georges Samman	9
Parti nul	Renaud Blais	9
Parti 51	Hans Mercier	5
Alliance pour la famille et les communautés	Alain Rioux	2
Parti humain du Québec	Marie-Ève Ouellette	2
Parti culinaire du Québec	Jean-Louis Thémistocle	2
Parti accès propriété et équité	Shawn Lalande McLean	1
Parti libertarien du Québec	Charles-Olivier Bolduc	1
Union nationale	Jonathan Blanchette	1
Independent		14
Total		881

== Abbreviations guide ==
Abbreviations of political parties used in these tables:

- AFC – Alliance pour la famille et les communautés
- Auto. – Équipe autonomiste
- BM – Bloc Montréal
- CaPQ – Canadian Party of Québec
- CAQ – Coalition Avenir Québec
- Climat – Climat Québec
- Conservative – Conservative Party of Quebec
- Cul. – Parti culinaire du Québec
- DD – Démocratie directe
- Green – Green Party of Québec
- Hum. – Parti humain du Québec
- Ind. – Independent
- Liberal – Quebec Liberal Party
- Libertarien – Parti libertarien du Québec
- ML – Marxist–Leninist Party of Québec
- ND – No designation
- Nul – Parti nul
- P51 – Parti 51
- PAPÉ – Parti accès propriété et équité
- PQ – Parti Québécois
- QS – Québec solidaire
- UFF – L'union fait la force
- UN – Union nationale

== Candidates and results ==
† indicates that the incumbent is not seeking re-election.
Bold indicates party leader.
~~Strikethrough~~ indicates a candidate that has been disqualified or withdrew.

The source for all candidates is the Official list of candidates published by Élections Québec.

=== Bas-Saint-Laurent ===
Electoral district	Candidates							Incumbent
Electoral district	CAQ	Liberal	PQ	QS	Conservative	Climat	Other	Incumbent
Côte-du-Sud	Mathieu Rivest	Sylvain Lemieux	Michel Forget	Guillaume Dufour	Frédéric Poulin		Sylvain Cloutier (Auto.)	Marie-Eve Proulx †
Matane-Matapédia	Jean-Sébastien Barriault	Harley Ryan Lounsbury	Pascal Bérubé	Marie-Phare Boucher	Alexandre Leblanc		Madeleine Rose (UFF)	Pascal Bérubé
Rimouski	Maïté Blanchette Vézina	Claude Laroche	Samuel Ouellet	Carol-Ann Kack	Stéphanie Du Mesnil	Pierre Beaudoin	Danielle Mélanie Gaudreau (DD)	Harold LeBel †
Rivière-du-Loup–Témiscouata	Amélie Dionne	Louis Bellemare	Félix Rioux	Myriam Lapointe-Gagnon	Louise Moreault	Carole Sierpien		Denis Tardif †

=== Saguenay–Lac-Saint-Jean ===
Electoral district	Candidates							Incumbent
Electoral district	CAQ	Liberal	PQ	QS	Conservative	Climat	Other	Incumbent
Chicoutimi	Andrée Laforest	Gabriel Caron	Alice Villeneuve	Adrien Guibert-Barthez	Éric Girard			Andrée Laforest
Dubuc	François Tremblay	Berry Zinga Nkuni	Émile Simard	Andrée-Anne Brillant	Tommy Pageau	Gilbert Simard		François Tremblay
Jonquière	Yannick Gagnon	Wilda Solon	Caroline Dubé	Karla Cynthia Garcia Martinez	Isabelle Champagne		Line Bélanger (Nul)	Sylvain Gaudreault †
Lac-Saint-Jean	Eric Girard	Tricia Murray	William Fradette	Elsa Moulin	Luc Martel	Martin Lavoie	Chantale Villeneuve (Libertarien)	Éric Girard
Roberval	Nancy Guillemette	Maxim Lavoie	Patrice Bouchard	Michaël Ottereyes	Samuel Gaudreault	Lynda Lalancette		Nancy Guillemette

=== Capitale-Nationale ===
Electoral district	Candidates								Incumbent
Electoral district	CAQ	Liberal	PQ	QS	Conservative	Green	Climat	Other	Incumbent
Charlesbourg	Jonatan Julien	Mahamadou Sissoko	Priscilla Corbeil	Ève Duhaime	Jean Domingue	Odevie Essaidi		Daniel Pelletier (DD) David Cantin (P51)	Jonatan Julien
Charlevoix–Côte-de-Beaupré	Kariane Bourassa	Michel Bureau	Lucien Rodrigue	Myriam Fortin	Odré Lacombe			Stefany Tremblay (DD)	Émilie Foster †
Chauveau	Sylvain Lévesque	Igor Pivovar	Charles-Hubert Riverin	Jimena Ruiz Aragon	**Éric Duhaime**		Christine Lepage	**Renaud Blais** (Nul) Nicolas Bouffard Savoie (Auto.)	Sylvain Lévesque
Jean-Lesage	Christiane Gamache	Charles Robert	Michaël Potvin	Sol Zanetti	Denise Peter	Félix-Antoine Bérubé-Simard	Mario Ledoux	Lucie Perreault (DD) Claude Moreau (ML)	Sol Zanetti
Jean-Talon	Joëlle Boutin	Julie White	Gabriel Coulombe	Olivier Bolduc	Sébastien Clavet	Alexandre Dallaire	Julien Cardinal	**Stéphane Pouleur** (Auto.)	Joëlle Boutin
La Peltrie	Éric Caire	Frédéric Doumalin	Martin Trudel	Lucie Villeneuve	Stéphane Lachance	Sandra Mara Riedo	Alain Fortin	Martin Grand'Maison (DD) Olivier Grondin (Nul)	Éric Caire
Louis-Hébert	Geneviève Guilbault	Dominic Cardinal	Victor Dubuc	Steven Lachance	Marika Robitaille	Daydree Vendette		Yolaine Brochu (Auto.) Jean-Pierre Hamel (DD)	Geneviève Guilbault
Montmorency	Jean-François Simard	Mustapha Berri	Cynthia Therrien	Annie-Pierre Bélanger	Mylene Bouchard	Nicholas Lescarbeau		Jean Bédard (ML)	Jean-François Simard
Portneuf	Vincent Caron	Patrick Hayes	Alexandre Mc Cabe	Anne-Marie Melançon	Jacinthe-Eve Arel			Patrick Bourson (Ind.) Karine Simard (DD)	Vincent Caron
Taschereau	Pascale St-Hilaire	Ahmed Lamine Touré	Jeanne Robin	Étienne Grandmont	Marie-Josée Hélie	Andrew Karim	Jean-François Joubert	Guy Boivin (Auto.) Marie-Soleil Fillion (Ind.)	Catherine Dorion †
Vanier-Les Rivières	Mario Asselin	Karl Filion	William Duquette	Karoline Boucher	Donald Gagnon	Kadidia Mahamane Bamba	Jean Cloutier	Mathieu Guillemette (Ind.)	Mario Asselin

=== Mauricie ===
Electoral district	Candidates							Incumbent
Electoral district	CAQ	Liberal	PQ	QS	Conservative	UFF	Other	Incumbent
Champlain	Sonia LeBel	Jérémy Leblanc	Alexandre Litalien	Marjolaine Trottier	Steve Massicotte	Bianca Nancy Pinel		Sonia LeBel
Laviolette–Saint-Maurice	Marie-Louise Tardif	Kévin Nzoula-Mendome	Pascal Bastarache	France Lavigne	Pierre-David Tremblay	Raoul Parent	Jean-Patrick Berthiaume (Ind.) Josée St-Georges (AFC)	Marie-Louise Tardif
Maskinongé	Simon Allaire	Alexandra Malenfant-Veilleux	Dominique Gélinas	Simon Piotte	Serge Noël	Françoise Boisvert	Alain Bélanger (Ind.) Gilles Brodeur (P51) Daniel Simon (Green)	Simon Allaire
Trois-Rivières	Jean Boulet	Adams Tekougoum	Laurent Vézina	Steven Roy Cullen	Karine Pépin	**Georges Samman**	Éric Trottier (Climat)	Jean Boulet

=== Estrie ===
Electoral district	Candidates							Incumbent
Electoral district	CAQ	Liberal	PQ	QS	Conservative	DD	Other	Incumbent
Brome-Missisquoi	Isabelle Charest	Claude Vadeboncoeur	Guillaume Paquet	Alexandre Legault	Stéphanie Prévost	Pierre Fontaine	Sébastien Houle (Ind.) Lynn Moore (CaPQ) Caitlin Moynan (Green) Tommy Quirion-Bouchard (Climat)	Isabelle Charest
Granby	François Bonnardel	Penny Lamarre	Guy Bouthillier	Anne-Sophie Legault	Stéphane Bernier		Jimmy Paquin (Auto.) Andrzej Wisniowski (Green)	François Bonnardel
Mégantic	François Jacques	Eloïse Gagné	André Duncan	Marilyn Ouellet	Mathieu Chenard		André Giguère (P51)	François Jacques
Orford	Gilles Bélanger	Vicki-May Hamm	Monique Allard	Kenza Sassi	Martin Lamontagne Lacasse	Joel Lacroix	Mark Gandey (CaPQ)	Gilles Bélanger
Richmond	André Bachand	Mona Louis-Jean	Jacinthe Caron	Philippe Pagé	Marylaine Bélair	Richard Magnan	Raymond de Martin (ND)	André Bachand
Saint-François	Geneviève Hébert	Claude Charron	Sylvie Tanguay	Mélissa Généreux	Dany Bernier		Olivier Dion (Climat) Colleen McInerney (CaPQ)	Geneviève Hébert
Sherbrooke	Caroline St-Hilaire	François Vaes	Yves Bérubé-Lauzière	Christine Labrie	Zoée St-Amand	Alexandre Asselin	Alain Barbier (Climat) Raphaëlle Dompierre (Nul) Victoria Karny (Green)	Christine Labrie

=== Montréal ===
==== East ====
Electoral district	Candidates								Incumbent
Electoral district	CAQ	Liberal	PQ	QS	Conservative	Green	Climat	Other	Incumbent
Anjou–Louis-Riel	Karine Boivin Roy	Chantal Gagnon	Yastene Adda	Laurence Pageau	Genevieve Deneault		Claude Gélinas	Katy LeRougetel (ND)	Lise Thériault †
Bourassa-Sauvé	Absa Diallo	Madwa-Nika Cadet	Zacharie Robitaille	Ricardo Gustave	Carmel-Antoine Bessard	Omar Ahmed		**Shawn Lalande McLean** (PAPÉ) Smaille Toussaint (Ind.)	Paule Robitaille †
Camille-Laurin	Richard Campeau	Christina Eyangos	**Paul St-Pierre Plamondon**	~~Marie-Eve Rancourt~~	Christos Karteris	Bourama Keita	Jean-Pierre Émond	Charles Mc Nicoll (Auto.) Grace St-Gelais (DD)	Richard Campeau
Gouin	Catherine Pelletier	Rita Ikhouane	Vincent Delorme	**Gabriel Nadeau-Dubois**	Jayson Paquette Gendron	Valérie Vedrines		Jean-Benoit Garneau-Bédard (Nul) **Chef Thémis** (Cul.)	Gabriel Nadeau-Dubois
Hochelaga-Maisonneuve	Rebecca McCann	Line Flore Tchetmi	Stephan Fogaing	Alexandre Leduc	Louise Poudrier	Wejden Chouchene	James Strayer	Christine Dandenault (ML)	Alexandre Leduc
Jeanne-Mance–Viger	Julie De Martino	Filomena Rotiroti	Laurence Massey	Marie-Josée Forget	Chakib Saad	Alessandra Szilagyi		Giovanni Manfredi (CaPQ)	Filomena Rotiroti
LaFontaine	Loredana Bacchi	Marc Tanguay	Shawn Vermette-Tassoni	Anne B-Godbout	Yassir Madih	Quinn Brunet			Marc Tanguay
Laurier-Dorion	Vicki Marcoux	Deepak Awasti	Maxime Larochelle	Andrés Fontecilla	Guy Diotte	Ismaila Marega	Anthony Van Duyse	Amir Khan (BM) Mathieu Marcil (Nul) Amélie Villeneuve (Cul.)	Andrés Fontecilla
Maurice-Richard	Audrey Murray	Jonathan Marleau	Chantal Jorg	Haroun Bouazzi	Louise Sexton	Gilles Fournelle	Patrick Bouchardy	Kassandre Chéry Théodat (Ind.) Andrea Di Stefano (BM)	Marie Montpetit †
Mercier	Florence Lavictoire	Catherine Boundjia	Sabrina Mercier-Ullhorn	Ruba Ghazal	Emmanuel Da Costa	Véronique Langlois		Jenny Cartwright (Nul)	Ruba Ghazal
Pointe-aux-Trembles	Chantal Rouleau	Byanca Jeune	Jocelyn Desjardins	Simon Tremblay-Pepin	Yves Beaulieu	Alex Di Pardo	Marc Michaud	Louis Chandonnet (Auto.) Geneviève Royer (ML)	Chantal Rouleau
Rosemont	Sandra O'Connor	Sherlyne Duverneau	Pierre-Luc Brillant	Vincent Marissal	Marie-France Lemay	Jamie D’Souza	Jean-François Racine		Vincent Marissal
Sainte-Marie–Saint-Jacques	Aurélie Diep	Christopher Baenninger	Phoeby Laplante	Manon Massé	Stéfan Marquis	Hailey Roop	Jency Mercier	Linda Sullivan (ML)	Manon Massé
Viau	Justine Savard	Frantz Benjamin	Marc-Antoine Lecompte	Renée-Chantal Belinga	Alex Tembel	Manel Chaouche	Serge Ricard	Marc II Réjouis (BM)	Frantz Benjamin

==== West ====
Electoral district	Candidates								Incumbent
Electoral district	CAQ	Liberal	PQ	QS	Conservative	Green	CaPQ	Other	Incumbent
Acadie	Rosmeri Otoya Celis	André A. Morin	Véronique Lecours	Elyse Lévesque	Stéphanie Gentile	Roula Al Nseir			Christine St-Pierre †
D'Arcy-McGee	Junlian Leblanc	Elisabeth Prass	Renée-Claude Lafontaine	Hilal Pilavci	Bonnie Feigenbaum	Moussa Seck	Marc Perez	Joel Debellefeuille (BM) Diane Johnston (ML)	David Birnbaum †
Jacques-Cartier	Rébecca Guénard-Chouinard	Gregory Kelley	Chantal Beauregard	Marie-Ève Mathieu	Louis-Charles Fortier	Virginie Beaudet	Arthur Fischer		Greg Kelley
Marguerite-Bourgeoys	Vicky Michaud	Fred Beauchemin	Suzanne Tremblay	Angélique Soleil Lavoie	Aleksa Drakul	Carole Thériault		Serge Bellemare (Climat) Keeton Clarke (BM)	Hélène David †
Marquette	Marc Baaklini	Enrico Ciccone	Stéphane Richard	Jérémy Côté	Sam Nassr	Shameem Jauffur		Félix Vincent Ardea (ND)	Enrico Ciccone
Mont-Royal–Outremont	Sarah Beaumier	Michelle Setlakwe	Ophélie Bastien	Isabelle Leblanc	Sabrina Ait Akil	Malik Guelmi	Anne Goldberg Harrison	David A Cherniak (Nul)	Pierre Arcand †
Nelligan	Cynthia Lapierre	Monsef Derraji	Jocelyn Caron	Maxime Larue-Bourdages	Gary Charles	Daniel Reiniger	Jean Marier	Neena Hanif (BM) Michael Hennawy (DD)	Monsef Derraji
Notre-Dame-de-Grâce	Geneviève Lemay	Désirée McGraw	Cloé Rose Jenneau	Élisabeth Labelle	Roy Eappen	**Alex Tyrrell**	Constantine Eliadis	Rachel Hoffman (ML) **Balarama Holness** (BM)	Kathleen Weil †
Robert-Baldwin	Maïté Beaudoin	Brigitte Garceau	Alix Martel	Marieve Ruel	Axel Lellouche	David MacFarquhar	Jonathan Gray	Qaiser Choudhry (BM)	Carlos Leitão †
Saint-Henri–Sainte-Anne	Nicolas Huard-Isabelle	**Dominique Anglade**	Julie Daubois	Guillaume Cliche-Rivard	Mischa White	Jean-Pierre Duford		Esther Gaudreault (DD) Janusz Kaczorowski (BM)	Dominique Anglade
Saint-Laurent	Mélanie Gauthier	Marwah Rizqy	Karl Dugal	Gérard Briand	Catherine St-Clair	Othmane Benzekri	Myrtis-Eirene Fossey	Rizwan Muhammad Rajput (BM)	Marwah Rizqy
Verdun	Véronique Tremblay	Isabelle Melançon	Claudia Valdivia	Alejandra Zaga Mendez	Lucien Koty	Jannie Pellerin	Scott Kilbride	Fernand Deschamps (ML) Alexandre Desmarais (Climat) Marc-André Milette (Nul) **Alain Rioux** (AFC)	Isabelle Melançon
Westmount–Saint-Louis	Maria-Luisa Torres-Piaggio	Jennifer Maccarone	Florence Racicot	David Touchette	Katya Rossokhata	Sam Kuhn	**Colin Standish**	Heidi Small (BM)	Jennifer Maccarone

=== Outaouais ===
Electoral district	Candidates							Incumbent
Electoral district	CAQ	Liberal	PQ	QS	Conservative	Green	Other	Incumbent
Chapleau	Mathieu Lévesque	Assumpta Ndengeyingoma	Marisa Gutierrez	Sabrina Labrecque-Boivin	Matthieu Kadri		Anne-Marie Meunier (Climat) Pierre Soublière (ML)	Mathieu Lévesque
Gatineau	Robert Bussière	Caryl Green	Raphaël Déry	Laura Avalos	Joëlle Jammal		Robert Dupuis (DD) Danilo Velasquez (CaPQ)	Robert Bussière
Hull	Suzanne Tremblay	Maryse Gaudreault	Camille Pellerin-Forget	Mathieu Perron-Dufour	Lise Couture	Rachid Jemmah		Maryse Gaudreault
Papineau	Mathieu Lacombe	Wittlyn Kate Semervil	Audrey-Ann Chicoine	Marie-Claude Latourelle	Marc Carrière	Melissa Arbour	Cédric Brazeau (DD)	Mathieu Lacombe
Pontiac	Corinne Canuel-Jolicoeur	André Fortin	Jolaine Paradis-Châteauneuf	Mike Owen Sebagenzi	Terrence Watters	Pierre Cyr	William Twolan (CaPQ)	André Fortin

=== Abitibi-Témiscamingue ===
Electoral district	Candidates						Incumbent
Electoral district	CAQ	Liberal	PQ	QS	Conservative	Other	Incumbent
Abitibi-Est	Pierre Dufour	Jean-Maurice Matte	Jacline Rouleau	Benjamin Gingras	Maxym Perron-Tellier		Pierre Dufour
Abitibi-Ouest	Suzanne Blais	Guy Bourgeois	Samuel Doré	Alexis Lapierre	François Vigneault	**Jonathan Blanchette** (UN)	Suzanne Blais
Rouyn-Noranda–Témiscamingue	Daniel Bernard	Arnaud Warolin	Jean-François Vachon	Émilise Lessard-Therrien	Robert Daigle	Chantal Corswarem (Green)	Émilise Lessard-Therrien

=== Côte-Nord ===
Electoral district	Candidates							Incumbent
Electoral district	CAQ	Liberal	PQ	QS	Conservative	Climat	Independent	Incumbent
Duplessis	Kateri Champagne Jourdain	Chamroeun Khuon	Marilou Vanier	Uapukun Mestokosho	Roberto Stea	Jacques Gélineau		Lorraine Richard †
René-Lévesque	Yves Montigny	Marc Duperron	Jeff Dufour Tremblay	Audrey Givern-Héroux	Marie-Renée Raymond	Richard Delisle	(Philippe) Gilles Babin	Martin Ouellet †

=== Nord-du-Québec ===
Electoral district	Candidates					Incumbent
Electoral district	CAQ	Liberal	PQ	QS	Conservative	Incumbent
Ungava	Denis Lamothe	Tunu Napartuk	Christine Moore	Maïtée Labrecque-Saganash	Nancy Lalancette	Denis Lamothe

=== Gaspésie–Îles-de-la-Madeleine ===
Electoral district	Candidates						Incumbent
Electoral district	CAQ	Liberal	PQ	QS	Conservative	Other	Incumbent
Bonaventure	Catherine Blouin	Christian Cyr	Alexis Deschênes	Catherine Cyr Wright	François Therrien	Anne Marie Lauzon (UFF) Jocelyn Rioux (Climat)	Sylvain Roy †
Gaspé	Stéphane Sainte-Croix	Michel Marin	Méganne Perry Mélançon	Yv Bonnier Viger	Pier-Luc Bouchard		Méganne Perry Mélançon
Îles-de-la-Madeleine	Jonathan Lapierre	Gil Thériault	Joël Arseneau	Jean-Philippe Déraspe	Evan Leblanc		Joël Arseneau

=== Chaudière-Appalaches ===
Electoral district	Candidates						Incumbent
Electoral district	CAQ	Liberal	PQ	QS	Conservative	Other	Incumbent
Beauce-Nord	Luc Provençal	Clermont Rouleau	Paméla Lavoie-Savard	François Jacques-Côté	Olivier Dumais	Gwendoline Mathieu-Poulin (Climat)	Luc Provençal
Beauce-Sud	Samuel Poulin	Antoine Poulin	Jean-François Major	Olivier Fecteau	Jonathan Poulin	**Hans Mercier** (P51)	Samuel Poulin
Bellechasse	Stéphanie Lachance	François Bégin	Jean-Daniel Fontaine	Jérôme D'Auteuil Sirois	Michel Tardif		Stéphanie Lachance
Chutes-de-la-Chaudière	Martine Biron	Wafa Oueslati	François-Noël Brault	Caroline Thibault	Mario Fortier		Marc Picard †
Lévis	Bernard Drainville	Richard Garon	Pierre-Gilles Morel	Valérie Cayouette-Guilloteau	Karine Laflamme	Mehdi Lahlou (Green) André Voyer (Climat)	François Paradis †
Lotbinière-Frontenac	Isabelle Lecours	Normand Côté	Louise Marchand	Christine Gilbert	Christian Gauthier		Isabelle Lecours

=== Laval ===
Electoral district	Candidates							Incumbent
Electoral district	CAQ	Liberal	PQ	QS	Conservative	Green	Other	Incumbent
Chomedey	George Platanitis	Sona Lakhoyan Olivier	Rachid Bandou	Zachary Robert	Konstantinos Merakos	Sahbi Nablia	Federica Gangai (BM)	Guy Ouellette †
Fabre	Alice Abou-Khalil	Sonia Baudelot	Catherine Dansereau-Redhead	Jessy Léger	Stéphane Turmel	Lynn Buchanan		Monique Sauvé †
Laval-des-Rapides	Céline Haytayan	Saul Polo	Andréanne Fiola	Josée Chevalier	Nicolas Lussier-Clément	Zied Damergi		Saul Polo
Mille-Îles	Julie Séide	Virginie Dufour	Michel Lachance	Guillaume Lajoie	Ange Claude Bigilimana	Bianca Jitaru		Francine Charbonneau †
Sainte-Rose	Christopher Skeete	Michel Trottier	Lyne Jubinville	Karine Cliche	Stéphanie Beauchamp	Pierrette Kamning Nguendjong	Simon Filiatrault (Climat) Kevin Fortin (P51)	Christopher Skeete
Vimont	Valérie Schmaltz	Anabela Monteiro	Nathalie Lavigne	Josée Bélanger	Stefano Piscitelli	Rita Lo Cicero		Jean Rousselle †

=== Lanaudière ===
Electoral district	Candidates						Incumbent
Electoral district	CAQ	Liberal	PQ	QS	Conservative	Other	Incumbent
Berthier	Caroline Proulx	Hassan Abdallah	Julie Boucher	Amélie Drainville	Benoit Primeau	Claire Aubin (Climat)	Caroline Proulx
Joliette	François St-Louis	Diana Mélissa Crispin	Véronique Venne	Flavie Trudel	Pascal Laurin		Véronique Hivon †
L'Assomption	**François Legault**	Thomas Ano-Dumas	Catherine Provost	Martin Lefebvre	Ernesto Almeida		François Legault
Masson	Mathieu Lemay	Gabriel Bourret	Stéphane Handfield	Émile Bellerose-Simard	François Truchon	Marc-André Bélisle (Green)	Mathieu Lemay
Repentigny	Pascale Déry	Virginie Bouchard	Aïcha Van Dun	Ednal Marc	Serge Cloutier	David Brisebois (Climat)	Lise Lavallée †
Rousseau	Louis-Charles Thouin	Estelle Regina Lokrou	Pierre Vanier	Ernesto Castro Roch	Gisèle DesRoches		Louis-Charles Thouin
Terrebonne	Pierre Fitzgibbon	Lindsay Jean	Geneviève Couture	Nadia Poirier	Daniela Andreeva	Marie-France Meloche (DD) Nazar Tarpinian (Green)	Pierre Fitzgibbon

=== Laurentides ===
Electoral district	Candidates							Incumbent
Electoral district	CAQ	Liberal	PQ	QS	Conservative	Green	Other	Incumbent
Argenteuil	Agnès Grondin	Philippe LeBel	François Girard	Marcel Lachaine	Karim Elayoubi	Luis Alvarez	Jean Lalonde (CaPQ) Marie-Eve Milot (DD)	Agnès Grondin
Bertrand	France-Élaine Duranceau	André Nadeau	Guillaume Freire	Julie Francoeur	Philippe Meloni	Karine Steinberger	Samuel Fortin (Climat) **Marie-Eve Ouellette** (Hum.)	Nadine Girault †
Blainville	Mario Laframboise	Alexandre Mercho	Frédéric Labelle	Éric Michaud	Grace Daou		Marie-France Hanna (DD)	Mario Laframboise
Deux-Montagnes	Benoit Charette	Marc Allaire	Guillaume Lalonde	Olivier Côté	Isabelle Baril	Amavi Tagodoe	Hélèna Courteau (Climat) Dominique Dubois-Massey (UFF)	Benoit Charette
Groulx	Eric Girard	Audrey Medaino-Tardif	Jeanne Craig-Larouche	Marie-Noëlle Aubertin	Valerie Messore	Victoria Shahsavar-Arshad		Eric Girard
Labelle	Chantale Jeannotte	Annie Bélizaire	Daniel Corbeil	Jasmine Roy	Claude Paquin		François Beauchamp (Climat)	Chantale Jeannotte
Les Plaines	Lucie Lecours	Elizabeth Stavrakakis	Normand Ouellette	Richard Jr Leblanc	Ian Lavallée	Mohamed Benmoumene		Lucie Lecours
Mirabel	Sylvie D'Amours	Isabella Giosi	Carole Savoie	Marjolaine Goudreau	Gala Durand		Pierre Larouche (UFF) Rémi Lavoie (DD)	Sylvie D'Amours
Prévost	Sonia Bélanger	Suzanne Pomerleau	Thérèse Chabot	Rose Crevier-Dagenais	Benoit Cloutier	Michelle Vaz	Michel Leclerc (Hum.)	Marguerite Blais †
Saint-Jérôme	Youri Chassin	Martin Plante	Sandrine Michon	Marc-Olivier Neveu	Maxime Clermont	Marcella Bustamante		Youri Chassin

=== Montérégie ===
==== Eastern ====
Electoral district	Candidates								Incumbent
Electoral district	CAQ	Liberal	PQ	QS	Conservative	Climat	DD	Other	Incumbent
Borduas	Simon Jolin-Barrette	Eribert Charles	Paule Laprise	Benoît Landry	Jean-Félix Racicot	Marcel Thibodeau	Stephen Gauthier	Thomas Thibault-Vincent (Green)	Simon Jolin-Barrette
Chambly	Jean-François Roberge	Lina Yunes	Marie-Laurence Desgagné	Vincent Michaux-St-Louis	Daniel Desnoyers	Sanae Chahad	Caroline Boisvert		Jean-François Roberge
Iberville	Audrey Bogemans	Steve Trinque	Jean-Alexandre Côté	Philippe Jetten-Vigeant	Anne Casabonne	Philippe Brassard	**Jean-Charles Cléroux**		Claire Samson †
Richelieu	Jean-Bernard Émond	Anthony Sauriol	Gabriel Arpin	David Dionne	Marie-Ève Dionne	Alejandra Velasquez	André Blanchette		Jean-Bernard Émond
Saint-Hyacinthe	Chantal Soucy	Agnieszka Wnorowska	Alexis Gagné-Lebrun	Philippe Daigneault	Kim Beaudoin	Julie Raiche		Gary Daigneault (Ind.) Mustapha Jaalouk (Green)	Chantal Soucy
Saint-Jean	Louis Lemieux	Benjamin Roy	Alexandre Girard-Duchaine	Pierre-Luc Lavertu	Dominick Melnitzky	Denis Thériault	Raymond Choquette		Louis Lemieux
Verchères	Suzanne Roy	Gabriel Lévesque	Cédric Gagnon-Ducharme	Manon Harvey	Pascal Déry	Germain Dallaire	Pauline Boisvert	Lucien Beauregard (Ind.) Nadim Saikali (Green)	Suzanne Dansereau †

==== South Shore ====
Electoral district	Candidates								Incumbent
Electoral district	CAQ	Liberal	PQ	QS	Conservative	Green	Climat	Other	Incumbent
Beauharnois	Claude Reid	Marc Blanchard	Claudine Desforges	Emilie Poirier	Chantal Dauphinais	Hélène Savard	Mathieu Taillefer		Claude Reid
Châteauguay	Marie-Belle Gendron	Jean-François Primeau	Marianne Lafleur	Martin Bécotte	Patric Viau	Stéphanie Stevenson			MarieChantal Chassé †
Huntingdon	Carole Mallette	Jean-Claude Poissant	Nathan Leblanc	Emmanuelle Perras	François Gagnon	José Bro		Raymond Frizzell (CaPQ)	Claire IsaBelle †
La Pinière	Samuel Gatien	Linda Caron	Suzanne Gagnon	Jean-Claude Mugaba	Tzarevna Bratkova	Ryan Akshay Newbergher		Donna Pinel (CaPQ)	Gaétan Barrette †
Laporte	Isabelle Poulet	Mathieu Gratton	Soledad Orihuela-Bouchard	Claude Lefrançois	Évelyne Latreille	Jean-Philippe Charest	Ian Parent	Herby Fremont (CaPQ)	Nicole Ménard †
La Prairie	Christian Dubé	Julie Guertin	Sarah Joly-Simard	Pierre-Marc Allaire-Daly	Marie Pelletier		Barbara Joannette	Normand Chouinard (ML)	Christian Dubé
Marie-Victorin	Shirley Dorismond	Lyes Chekal	Pierre Nantel	Shophika Vaithyanathasarma	Lara Stillo	Vincent Aquin-Belleau	**Martine Ouellet**	**Pierre Chénier** (ML) Florent Portron (Auto.)	Shirley Dorismond
Montarville	Nathalie Roy	Lucie Gagnon	Daniel Michelin	Marie-Christine Veilleux	Evans Henry	Jeanne Dufour	Isadora Lamouche		Nathalie Roy
Sanguinet	Christine Fréchette	Rodrigue Asatsop	Daphnée Paquin-Auger	Virginie Bernier	François Gibeault	Halimatou Bah	Martine Lajoie	Hélène Héroux (ML)	Danielle McCann †
Soulanges	Marilyne Picard	Catherine St-Amour	Samuel Patenaude	Sophie Samson	Éloïse Coulombe	Kristian Solarik			Marilyne Picard
Taillon	Lionel Carmant	Omar Cissé	Andrée-Anne Bouvette-Turcot	Manon Blanchard	Pierre-Marc Boyer		Frédéric Ouellet	Pierre Savignac (UFF)	Lionel Carmant
Vachon	Ian Lafrenière	Yves Mbattang	Adam Wrzesien	Jean-Philippe Samson	Martine Boucher	Juan Carlos Nino Caita	Jean-Pierre Lacombe		Ian Lafrenière
Vaudreuil	Eve Bélec	Marie-Claude Nichols	Christopher Massé	Cynthia Bilodeau	Eve Théoret	Kelley Boileau		Jaspal Singh Ahluwalia (BM) David Hamelin-Schuilenburg (CaPQ) Paul Lynes (DD)	Marie-Claude Nichols

=== Centre-du-Québec ===
Electoral district	Candidates						Incumbent
Electoral district	CAQ	Liberal	PQ	QS	Conservative	Other	Incumbent
Arthabaska	Eric Lefebvre	Luciana Arantes	Mario Beauchesne	Pascale Fortin	Tarek Henoud	Trystan Martel (Climat)	Éric Lefebvre
Drummond–Bois-Francs	Sébastien Schneeberger	Pierre Poirier	Emrick Couture-Picard	Tony Martel	Myriam Cournoyer	Marco Beauchesne (Green) Steve Therion (Auto.)	Sébastien Schneeberger
Johnson	André Lamontagne	Mounirou Younoussa	Jérémie Poirier	Nancy Mongeau	Luce Daneau	Cindy Courtemanche (DD)	André Lamontagne
Nicolet-Bécancour	Donald Martel	Marie-Josée Jacques	Philippe Dumas	Jacques Thériault Watso	Mario Lyonnais		Donald Martel

== Candidate controversies ==
- Parti Québécois Candidate for Sainte-Rose Lyne Jubinville had past social media posts which were Anti Islam.
- Québec Solidaire Candidate for Camille-Laurin Marie-Eve Rancourt for removing PQ leaflets.
- Parti Québécois Candidate for Laval-des-Rapides Andreanne Fiola had a past history of making porn.
