= Port Joli River =

River in MRC L'Islet in Quebec (Canada)

- Location within Quebec
- Native name: Rivière Port Joli (French)

Location
- Country: Canada
- Province: Quebec
- Region: Chaudière-Appalaches
- MRC: L'Islet Regional County Municipality

Physical characteristics
- Source: Forest streams
  - location: Saint-Damase-de-L'Islet
  - coordinates: 47.225337°N 70.108616°W
  - elevation: 258 metres (846 ft)
- Mouth: St. Lawrence River
  - location: Saint-Jean-Port-Joli
  - coordinates: 47.17611°N 70.30527°W
  - elevation: 4 metres (13 ft)
- Length: 18.6 kilometres (11.6 mi)

Basin features
- Tributaries
  - left: (upstream) Pinguet River
  - right: (upstream)

The Port Joli River (in French: rivière Port Joli) is a tributary of the south shore of the St. Lawrence River where it flows southwest of the village of Saint-Jean-Port-Joli and north-east of the village of L'Islet-sur-Mer.

The Port Joli river flows through the municipalities of Saint-Damase-de-L'Islet, Sainte-Louise and Saint-Jean-Port-Joli, in the L'Islet Regional County Municipality, in the administrative region of Chaudière-Appalaches, in Quebec, in Canada.

== Geography ==
The Port Joli river takes its source from agricultural streams, located in the municipality of Saint-Damase-de-L'Islet. This spring is located at 9.7 kilometres (6.0 mi) southeast of the south shore of the St. Lawrence River, at 12.1 kilometres (7.5 mi) east of the center of the village of Saint-Jean-Port-Joli and 10.8 kilometres (6.7 mi) south of the center of the village of Saint-Roch-des-Aulnaies. Trois Saumons Lake flows through its northeast end.

From its source, the Port Joli River flows over 18.6 kilometres (11.6 mi), divided into the following segments:

- 2.0 kilometres (1.2 mi) south-west in Saint-Damase-de-L'Islet, to the Sainte-Louise limit;
- 1.3 kilometres (0.81 mi) west in Sainte-Louise, to the limit of Saint-Jean-Port-Joli;
- 8.4 kilometres (5.2 mi) southwest, to route 204;
- 1.3 kilometres (0.81 mi) southwest, to highway 20;
- 5.6 kilometres (3.5 mi) to the southwest, to its confluence.

At the end of its course, the Trois Saumons river flows onto the long shore (at low tide) in Anse Port Joli, on the south shore of the middle St. Lawrence estuary. This confluence is located 3.4 kilometres (2.1 mi) north-east of the village of L'Islet-sur-Mer and 4.6 kilometres (2.9 mi) to the south-west of the village of Saint-Jean-Port-Joli.

== Toponymy ==
The toponym Rivière Port Joli was formalized on December 2, 1975, at the Commission de toponymie du Québec.

== See also ==
- List of rivers of Quebec
