= Trois Saumons River =

River in MRC L'Islet in Quebec (Canada)

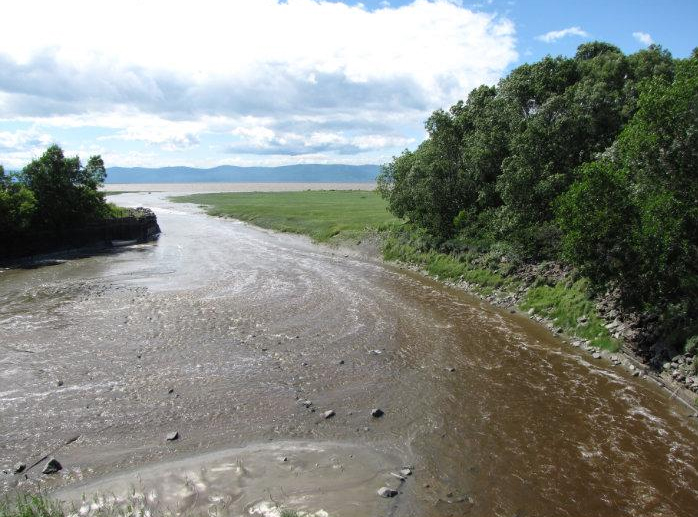

- Location within Quebec
- Native name: Rivière Trois Saumons (French)

Location
- Country: Canada
- Province: Quebec
- Region: Chaudière-Appalaches
- MRC: L'Islet Regional County Municipality

Physical characteristics
- Source: Lake Trois Saumons
  - location: Saint-Aubert
  - coordinates: 47.1418835°N 70.156465°W
  - elevation: 428 metres (1,404 ft)
- Mouth: St. Lawrence River
  - location: L'Islet
  - coordinates: 47.16167°N 70.31694°W
  - elevation: 4 metres (13 ft)
- Length: 17.0 kilometres (10.6 mi)

Basin features
- Tributaries
  - left: (upstream)
  - right: (upstream)

The Trois Saumons River (in French: Rivière Trois Saumons) is a tributary of the south shore of the St. Lawrence River where it flows to the southwest of the village of Saint-Jean-Port-Joli and to the north-east of the village of L'Islet-sur-Mer. The Trois-Saumons river water mill in Saint-Jean-Port-Joli is located upstream of route 132.

The Trois Saumons River flows through the municipalities of Saint-Aubert and Saint-Jean-Port-Joli, in the L'Islet Regional County Municipality, in the administrative region of Chaudière-Appalaches, in Quebec, in Canada.

== Geography ==
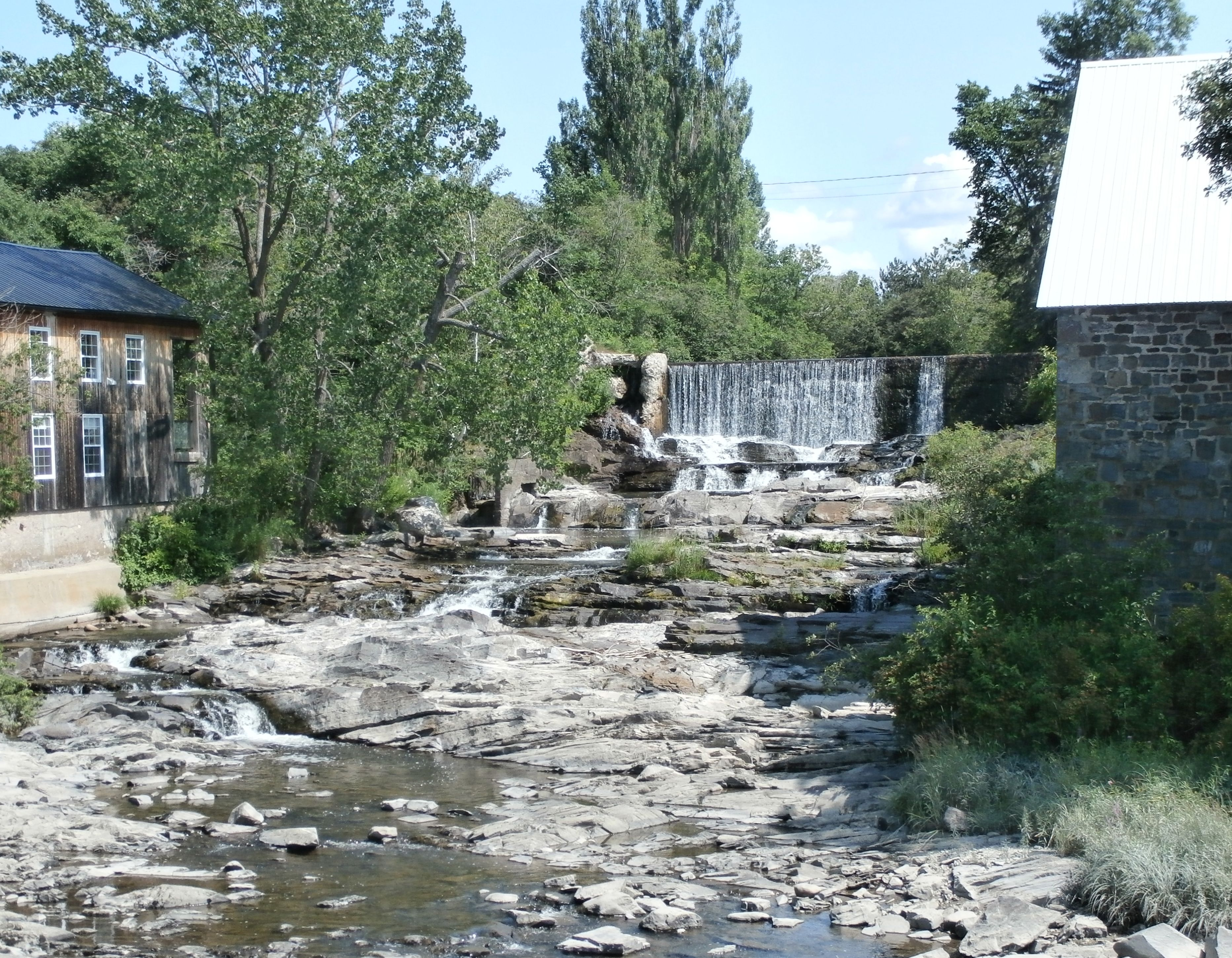
Watermill on the Trois-Saumons river to the southwest of the village of Saint-Jean-Port-Joli.

The Trois Saumons river takes its source from Trois Saumons lake (length: 5.5 kilometres (3.4 mi); altitude: 434 metres (1,424 ft)), located in the municipality of Saint-Aubert. This recreational and tourist-oriented lake, with a significant density of chalets on its banks, is surrounded by forest. This head lake is located 9.4 kilometres (5.8 mi) southeast of the south shore of the St. Lawrence River, 6.2 kilometres (3.9 mi) south of the center of the village of Saint-Aubert and at 9.0 kilometres (5.6 mi) northeast of the village center of Saint-Cyrille-de-Lessard. Trois Saumons Lake flows through its northeast end.

From its source, the Trois Saumons River flows over 17.0 kilometres (10.6 mi), divided into the following segments:

- 2.1 kilometres (1.3 mi) north-west, crossing the fifth rang East road in Saint-Aubert up to the Bélanger road;
- 3.0 kilometres (1.9 mi) towards the north-west, to the confluence of the Trois Saumons East River (coming from the east);
- 3.7 kilometres (2.3 mi) heading west, crossing rue Principale Ouest (and route du third rang west), to the limit between Saint-Aubert and Saint-Jean-Port-Joli;
- 3.2 kilometres (2.0 mi) northwesterly, up to highway 20;
- 5.0 kilometres (3.1 mi) heading west, crossing the railway line and cutting route 132, to its confluence.

At the end of its course, the Trois Saumons River flows onto the long shore (at low tide) in the Anse de Trois-Saumons, on the south shore of the middle estuary of the St. Laurent. This confluence is located 2.6 kilometres (1.6 mi) north-east of the village of L'Islet-sur-Mer and 6.8 kilometres (4.2 mi) to the south-west of the village of Saint-Jean-Port-Joli.

== Toponymy ==
The toponym Rivière Trois Saumons was formalized on December 5, 1968, at the Commission de toponymie du Québec.

== See also ==
- List of rivers of Quebec
