= Joncas River (Ferrée River tributary) =

River in MRC L'Islet in Quebec (Canada)

- Location within Quebec
- Native name: Rivière Joncas (French)

Location
- Country: Canada
- Province: Quebec
- Region: Chaudière-Appalaches
- MRC: L'Islet Regional County Municipality, Kamouraska Regional County Municipality

Physical characteristics
- Source: Forest streams
  - location: Sainte-Louise
  - coordinates: 47.278229°N 70.079735°W
  - elevation: 195 metres (640 ft)
- Mouth: Ferrée River
  - location: Sainte-Louise
  - coordinates: 47.24333°N 70.17139°W
  - elevation: 47 metres (154 ft)
- Length: 10.5 kilometres (6.5 mi)

Basin features
- Tributaries
  - left: (upstream) Ruisseau Gaudet
  - right: (upstream)

The Joncas River (in French: rivière Joncas) flows entirely in the municipality of Sainte-Louise, in the L'Islet Regional County Municipality, in the administrative region of Chaudière-Appalaches, Quebec, Canada.

The confluence of the Joncas river constitutes the head of the Ferrée River, which flows on 10.3 kilometres (6.4 mi) towards the north to go to the south bank of the St. Lawrence River. This last confluence is located in the small hamlet of Village-des-Aulnaies, located southwest of the village of La Pocatière and northeast of the village of Saint-Roch-des-Aulnaies.

== Toponymy ==
The toponym Joncas was formalized on December 5, 1968, at the Commission de toponymie du Québec.

== See also ==
- List of rivers of Quebec
