= Trois Saumons East River =

River in MRC L'Islet in Quebec (Canada)

- Location within Quebec
- Native name: Rivière Trois Saumons Est (French)

Location
- Country: Canada
- Province: Quebec
- Region: Chaudière-Appalaches
- MRC: L'Islet Regional County Municipality

Physical characteristics
- Source: Forest streams
  - location: Saint-Damase-de-L'Islet
  - coordinates: 47.144845°N 70.107621°W
  - elevation: 415 metres (1,362 ft)
- Mouth: Trois Saumons River
  - location: Saint-Aubert
  - coordinates: 47.16833°N 70.2025°W
  - elevation: 136 metres (446 ft)
- Length: 18.2 kilometres (11.3 mi)

Basin features
- Tributaries
  - left: (upstream) Ruisseau Creux, ruisseau à Bezeau
  - right: (upstream) Ruisseau Lapointe

The Trois Saumons East River (French: Trois Saumons Est) river is a tributary of the east bank of the Trois Saumons River which flows to the south bank of the St. Lawrence River where it flows south-west of the village of Saint-Jean-Port-Joli and north-east of the village of L'Islet-sur-Mer.

The Trois Saumons Est river flows through the municipalities of Saint-Damase-de-L'Islet and Saint-Aubert, in the L'Islet Regional County Municipality, in the administrative region of Chaudière-Appalaches, in Quebec, in Canada.

== Geography ==
The Trois Saumons Est river has its source on the eastern slope of the mountain designated "Le Pain de Sucre" which overlooks the eastern part of Trois Saumons lake (length: 5.5 kilometres (3.4 mi); altitude: 434 metres (1,424 ft)), located in the municipality of Saint-Aubert. This mountain stream-fed spring is located 3.2 kilometres (2.0 mi) east of Trois Saumons lake, 13.4 kilometres (8.3 mi) south-east of the south shore of St. Lawrence River, 5.9 kilometres (3.7 mi) south of the center of the village of Saint-Damase-de-L'Islet.

From its source, the Trois Saumons Est River flows over 18.2 kilometres (11.3 mi).

The Trois Saumons Est River flows onto the east bank of the Trois Saumons River, west of Route 204. This confluence is located 1.7 kilometres (1.1 mi) southeast of the center from the village of Saint-Aubert and 7.1 kilometres (4.4 mi) to the south-east of the center of the village of Saint-Jean-Port-Joli.

== Toponymy ==
The toponym Rivière Trois Saumons Est was formalized on December 5, 1968, at the Commission de toponymie du Québec.

== See also ==
- List of rivers of Quebec
