= Le Bras (Ferrée River tributary) =

River in MRC L'Islet and Kamouraska, in Quebec (Canada)

- Location within Quebec

Location
- Country: Canada
- Province: Quebec
- Region: Chaudière-Appalaches
- MRC: L'Islet Regional County Municipality, Kamouraska Regional County Municipality

Physical characteristics
- Source: Forest streams
  - location: La Pocatière
  - coordinates: 47.31896°N 70.01337°W
  - elevation: 197 metres (646 ft)
- Mouth: Ferrée River
  - location: Saint-Roch-des-Aulnaies
  - coordinates: 47.31549°N 70.144647°W
  - elevation: 6 metres (20 ft)
- Length: 14.6 kilometres (9.1 mi)

Basin features
- Tributaries
  - left: (upstream)
  - right: (upstream) Cours d'eau Martin

The Le Bras (in English: The Arm River) flows through the municipalities of La Pocatière (MRC of Kamouraska Regional County Municipality) and Saint-Roch-des-Aulnaies (MRC of L'Islet Regional County Municipality), in the administrative regions of Bas-Saint-Laurent and Chaudière-Appalaches, at Quebec, in Canada.

The Le Bras River is a tributary of the east bank of the Ferrée River, which flows 240 metres (790 ft) further north on the south shore of the St. Lawrence River. This last confluence is located in the small hamlet of Village-des-Aulnaies, located southwest of the village of La Pocatière and northeast of the village of Saint-Roch-des-Aulnaies.

== Geography ==
The Le Bras river has its source at Bourgelas lake (length: 0.8 kilometres (0.50 mi); altitude: 197 metres (646 ft)) located in La Pocatière. This lake is located 6.0 kilometres (3.7 mi) southeast of the south shore of the St. Lawrence River, 7.1 kilometres (4.4 mi) southwest of the village center from Saint-Onésime-d'Ixworth, at 5.3 kilometres (3.3 mi) south of the center of the village of La Pocatière and at 12.2 kilometres (7.6 mi) at the east of the village center of Saint-Roch-des-Aulnaies. This lake is located near the limit of the municipality of Saint-Onésime-d'Ixworth. Its mouth is located to the north-west.

From this lake, the Le Bras river flows in a forest and agricultural zone over 14.6 kilometres (9.1 mi), divided into the following segments:

- 2.0 kilometres (1.2 mi) towards the southwest in La Pocatière in a forest zone, crossing Lac Perdu (length: 160 metres (520 ft); altitude: 168 metres (551 ft)) to its mouth. This lake is located in a small valley on the east side of Montagne des Marais and on the north side of Coteau Pelé, near the limit of Saint-Roch-des-Aulnaies;
- 1.0 kilometre (0.62 mi) towards the southwest in a forest zone, up to the limit with Saint-Roch-des-Aulnaies;
- 4.2 kilometres (2.6 mi) towards the south-west in Saint-Roch-des-Aulnaies in a forest zone, collecting water from the Martin stream, up to the range of Haute-Ville;
- 4.0 kilometres (2.5 mi) towards the southwest, crossing the rang de la Haute-Ville, then north, to the third Rang East;
- 2.9 kilometres (1.8 mi) north-west along Route du Moulin, in an agricultural zone, to highway 20;
- 0.5 kilometres (0.31 mi) north-west, up to its confluence.

The Le Bras river empties on the east bank of the Ferrée river, just south of the route 132 (route de la Seigneurie) bridge, in the hamlet of Village-des-Aulnaies. This confluence is located at 2.9 kilometres (1.8 mi) east of the center of the village of Saint-Roch-des-Aulnaies and at 4.6 kilometres (2.9 mi) north of the center of village of Sainte-Louise.

== Toponymy ==
The toponym Le Bras was formalized on December 5, 1968, at the Commission de toponymie du Québec.

== See also ==
- List of rivers of Quebec
