= Ferrée River (L'Islet) =

River in MRC L'Islet in Quebec (Canada)

- Location within Quebec
- Native name: Rivière Ferrée (French)

Location
- Country: Canada
- Province: Quebec
- Region: Chaudière-Appalaches
- MRC: L'Islet Regional County Municipality

Physical characteristics
- Source: Lake Litalien
  - location: Sainte-Louise
  - coordinates: 47.243679°N 70.171117°W
  - elevation: 47 metres (154 ft)
- Mouth: St. Lawrence River
  - location: Saint-Roch-des-Aulnaies
  - coordinates: 47.31667°N 70.145°W
  - elevation: 4 metres (13 ft)
- Length: 10.3 kilometres (6.4 mi)

Basin features
- Tributaries
  - left: (upstream) ruisseau de la Côte des Chutes, ruisseau Francoeur
  - right: (upstream) Le Bras, Joncas River

The Ferrée River (in French: Rivière Ferrée) is a tributary of the south shore of the St. Lawrence River where it flows into the small hamlet of Village-des-Aulnaies, located southwest of the village of La Pocatière and north-east of the village of Saint-Roch-des-Aulnaies.

== Toponymy ==
The toponym Rivière Ferrée was formalized on December 5, 1968, at the Commission de toponymie du Québec.

== See also ==
- List of rivers of Quebec
