= Le Bras =

Le Bras is a Breton family name. It may refer to:

== People with the surname ==
- Dan ar Braz, Breton guitar player
- David Le Bras, (born 1983), Breton football player
- Gabriel Le Bras (1891–1970), Breton legal scholar and sociologist
- Hervé Le Bras (born 1943), French demographer and historian
- Jean-Pierre Le Bras (1931–2017), Breton landscape and maritime painter
- Roger Le Bras, French water polo player

== Geography ==
- Le Bras (Ferrée River tributary), in Bas-Saint-Laurent and Chaudière-Appalaches, Quebec, Canada
- Le Gros Bras (Gouffre River tributary), in Saint-Urbain, Quebec, Canada
- Le Petit Bras (Le Gros Bras), a tributary of Le Gros Bras, in Saint-Urbain, Quebec, Canada
