= Michèle Lorrain =

Canadian artist

- Born: 1960 (age 65–66); Montreal, Quebec, Canada
- Education: Université Laval; Université du Québec à Montréal
- Website: michelelorrain.ca

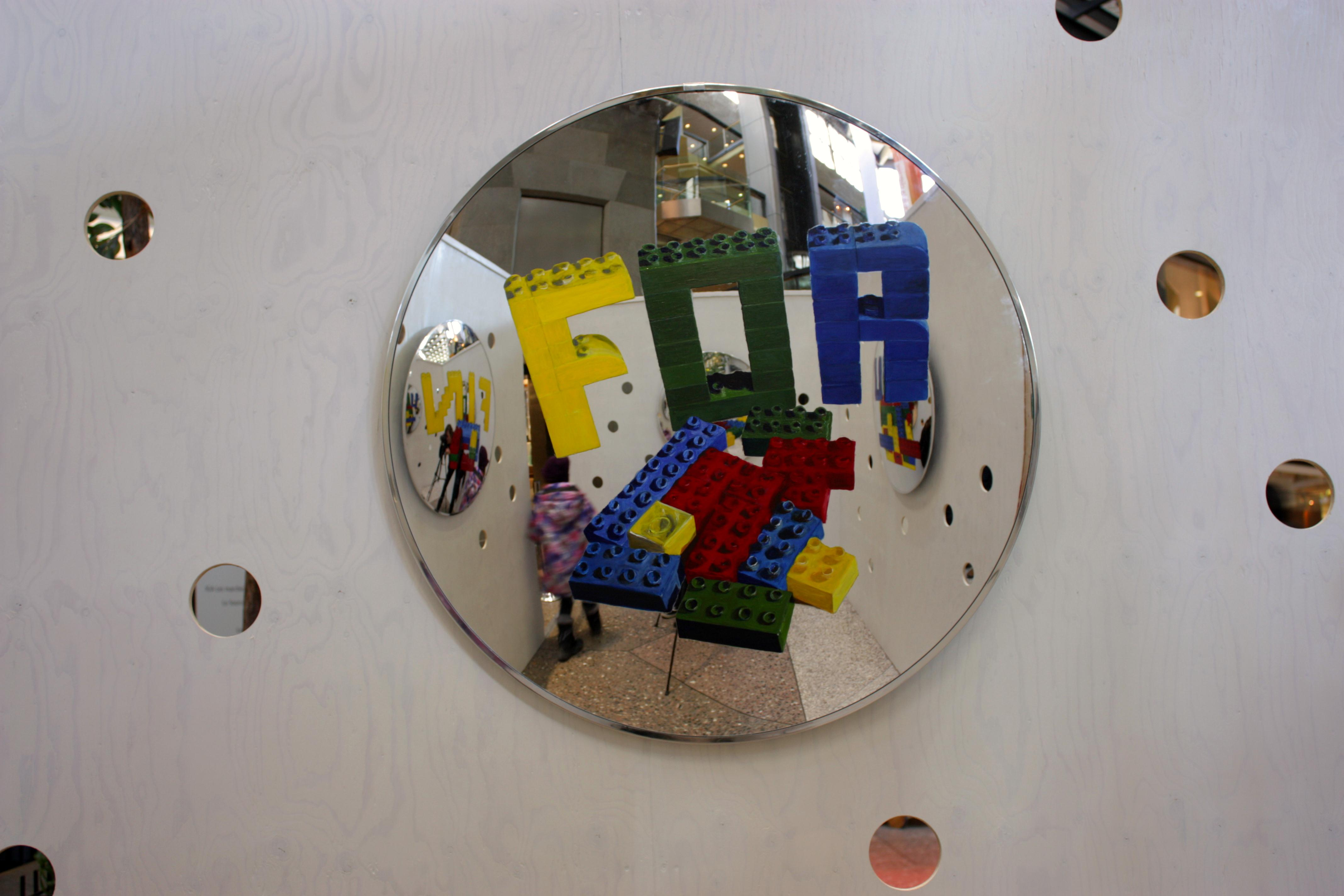

Michèle Lorrain is a Canadian artist specializing in painting and installation art.

== Life and work ==
Lorrain was born in 1960 in Montreal, Quebec. She lives and works in Sainte-Louise, Quebec. She earned her bachelor's degree from the Université Laval, followed by her Masters of Fine Arts from the Université du Québec à Montréal.

In September 2015, the Vimont Community Center in Laval, Quebec installed Lorrain's installation piece, in my yard on the north wall of the Vimont Community Center.

== Collections ==
- Black Mirrors 02.15.22.13, 2012, Musée national des beaux-arts du Québec

== Exhibitions ==
- the lost steps, 2016–2017, Biennale internationale du lin de Portneuf
