= Alexis Bélanger =

Alexis Bélanger (January 18, 1808 - September 7, 1868) was a Roman Catholic priest and missionary; born at Saint-Roch-des-Aulnaies, Lower Canada and died at Sandy Point, Newfoundland.

Abbé Bélanger began his time as a missionary in 1839. He served the a Catholic population of les Îles-de-la-Madeleine which was largely of Acadian origin until 1845 when many of these people relocated. He relocated with them for a time and, in 1850, was made vicar general of John Thomas Mullock, bishop of Newfoundland. He ministered to the fishermen along the west coast and traveled on missionary rounds to other areas. He served this area until his death.
