= Réal Gauvin =

Canadian politician

Member of the National Assembly of Quebec for Montmagny-L'Islet
- In office December 2, 1985 – April 14, 2003
- Preceded by: Jacques Leblanc
- Succeeded by: Norbert Morin

Personal details
- Born: March 30, 1935 (age 91) Saint-Adalbert, Quebec
- Party: Quebec Liberal Party
- Profession: Politician

Réal Gauvin (born March 30, 1935) is a Quebec politician, who served as the member for Montmagny-L'Islet in the Quebec National Assembly as a member of the Quebec Liberal Party from 1985 until 2003.

== Biography ==
Gauvin was manager of a lumber and sawmill company, and was a logger in the family business. He became the owner of R.-A. Gauvin Transport, a company specializing in the transportation of timber. He is also the owner of a pilot license.

== Political career ==
From 1975 until 1985, Gauvin was the Mayor of Saint-Adalbert, Quebec. He ran in the 1985 Quebec provincial election for the seat of Montmagny-L'Islet against incumbent Jacques Leblanc and won by nearly 25 points.

He was re-elected in 1989, 1994 and 1998, never facing a serious challenge. He served as a Deputy Government Whip and Parliamentary Secretary in the Daniel Johnson Jr. government. He subsequently did not seek re-election in 2003.

== Electoral record ==
=== Provincial ===
1998 Quebec general election
Party	Candidate	Votes	%	±%
Liberal	Réal Gauvin	11,047	45.99	+1.63
Parti Québécois	Mario Cantin	9,242	38.48	-2.21
Action démocratique	Frédéric Gagné	3,729	15.53	-

1994 Quebec general election
Party	Candidate	Votes	%	±%
Liberal	Réal Gauvin	10,339	44.36	-13.39
Parti Québécois	Daniel Blanchet	9,484	40.69	+4.85
Independent	Jean-Claude Roy	2,605	11.18	-
New Democrat	Gaston Bourget	881	3.78	-

1989 Quebec general election
Party	Candidate	Votes	%	±%
Liberal	Réal Gauvin	12,688	57.75	-2.77
Parti Québécois	Daniel Blanchet	7,874	35.84	+1.83
Green	André Blouin	1,407	6.40	-

1985 Quebec general election
Party	Candidate	Votes	%	±%
Liberal	Réal Gauvin	14,492	60.52	+15.92
Parti Québécois	Jacques Leblanc	8,143	34.01	-11.49
New Democrat	Louise Saint-Pierre	564	2.35	-
Independent	Antonio Cicchetti	500	2.09	-
Parti indépendantiste	Alain Raby	199	0.83	-
Christian socialist	Réjean Tardif	47	0.20	-
