= Camp Trois-Saumons =

Summer camp in Quebec

- Formation: 1946
- Founder: Abbé Raoul Cloutier
- Type: Non-profit organization
- Purpose: Summer camp and outdoor education
- Headquarters: Saint-Aubert, Quebec, Canada
- Location: Lake Trois-Saumons
- Coordinates: 47°06′38″N 70°13′07″W
- Region served: Quebec
- Official language: French
- Website: camps-odyssee.com

Camp Trois-Saumons, (Camp Three Salmons), is a summer camp and outdoor education centre located in Saint-Aubert, in the regional county municipality of L'Islet, Quebec, on the shores of Lake Trois-Saumons.

== History ==
It was founded in 1946 through the creation of the Camp-École Trois-Saumons Inc. corporation by Abbé Raoul Cloutier. The camp welcomed its first campers in 1947.

Initially reserved for boys, the camp began admitting girls in 1950. Full coeducation on site was introduced in 1953. an educational mission, Abbé Cloutier established several training structures, including the Red Cross School, Camp Marie-Victorin, the leadership school, and the counsellor training school.

Camp Trois-Saumons offers summer stays for children up to 17 years old, as well as school programs like nature classes and group accommodations. It is known for its counsellor training program, accredited by the Association des camps du Québec. A first version of this school operated from 1962 to 1975. It was relaunched in 1992 with the support of the Fondation Raoul-Cloutier.

Abbé Cloutier took part in founding the Association des camps du Québec in 1961. In 1963, the corporation acquired Camp Minogami, established on land bequeathed to youth by Frederick Weicker. The network later expanded with the opening of Camp Bourg-Royal in 1996, followed by the Odyssée day camp at Baie de Beauport in 2017.

In 1979, Camp Trois-Saumons hosted for the first time a camp for children with diabetes from eastern Quebec. During this period, the camp also began welcoming young people with cystic fibrosis, with medical support from the Centre hospitalier de l'Université Laval. This initiative was implemented under the direction of Pierre Bigaouette.

A commemorative plaque honouring Abbé Raoul Cloutier is installed at the entrance to the camp.

The camp was officially recognized by the Commission on Toponomy of Quebec in 2020.
