= Norbert Morin =

Canadian politician

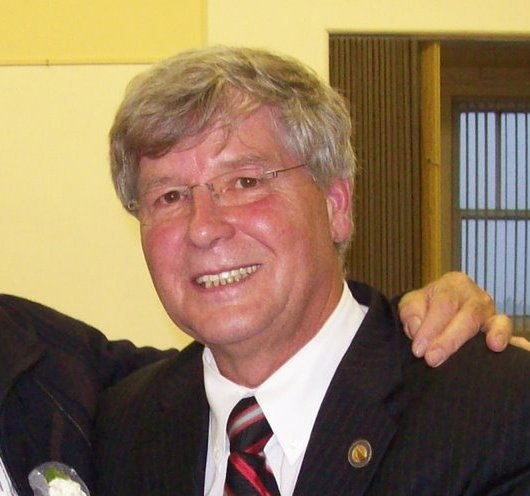

Member of the National Assembly of Quebec for Côte-du-Sud Montmagny-L'Islet (2003-2007, 2008-2012)
- In office December 8, 2008 – August 29, 2018
- Preceded by: Claude Roy
- Succeeded by: Marie-Eve Proulx
- In office April 14, 2003 – March 26, 2007
- Preceded by: Réal Gauvin
- Succeeded by: Claude Roy

Personal details
- Born: December 16, 1945 (age 80) Saint-François-de-la-Rivière-du-Sud, Quebec, Canada
- Party: Liberal

Norbert Morin (born December 16, 1945) is a Canadian politician in the province of Quebec. He is a member of the Quebec Liberal Party and was the member of the National Assembly of Quebec for Côte-du-Sud electoral district from 2008 to 2018.

He was first elected to represent the riding of Montmagny-L'Islet in the National Assembly of Quebec in the 2003 provincial election, but was defeated in the 2007 provincial election by Claude Roy of the Action démocratique du Québec. He was subsequently re-elected in the 2008 provincial election. Montmagny-L'Islet ceased to exist in the 2012 election, and Morin ran and won in the newly created Côte-du-Sud.

Prior to his election, Morin was a municipal councillor from 1974 to 2002 for the municipality of Saint-François-de-la-Rivière-du-Sud and was mayor for the town in 2003 and in 2007. He was an administrative member for a local Desjardins bank, the Montmagny CLSC and CHSLD as well as the local tourism office. He was also president for the public safety committee and an administrator of the local development centre of the Montmagny Regional County Municipality. He is also the owner of a meat shop since 1990.

During his first term, Morin was the parliamentary assistant to the Minister of Wildlife and Parks.
