= Claude Roy (politician) =

Canadian politician (born 1952)

MNA for Montmagny-L'Islet
- In office April 25, 2007 – November 5, 2008
- Preceded by: Norbert Morin
- Succeeded by: Norbert Morin

Personal details
- Born: April 25, 1952 (age 73) Montmagny, Quebec
- Party: Action démocratique du Québec
- Spouse: Francine Rochefort

Claude Roy (born April 25, 1952) is a politician from Quebec, Canada. He was an Action démocratique du Québec Member of the National Assembly for the electoral district of Montmagny-L'Islet from 2007 to 2008.

== Early life and career ==
Roy studied at the University of Ottawa in law but did not complete his degree. He worked as a sales representative for several companies including an automobile business and several pharmaceutical companies. He was also a host for an outdoor and fishing television show and founded a local fishing company as well as a local nature boutique. He also worked for Tele-Mag Inc as a host and marketing representative. He was also involved in the Federation québécoise de la faune and the Fondation de la faune du Québec as a volunteer.

He was first elected in the 2007 election with 43% of the vote. Liberal incumbent Norbert Morin, finished second with 38% of the vote. Roy took office on April 12, 2007.

During the campaign, Roy, who once produced and hosted a TV show about hunting and fishing, said that the federal firearms registry should be abolished. His leader Mario Dumont quickly indicated that Roy had the right to have his personal opinion, but that the ADQ wants the registry to be kept.
