= Trois-Saumons river water mill in Saint-Jean-Port-Joli =

Coordinates: 47°09′39″N 70°18′54″W

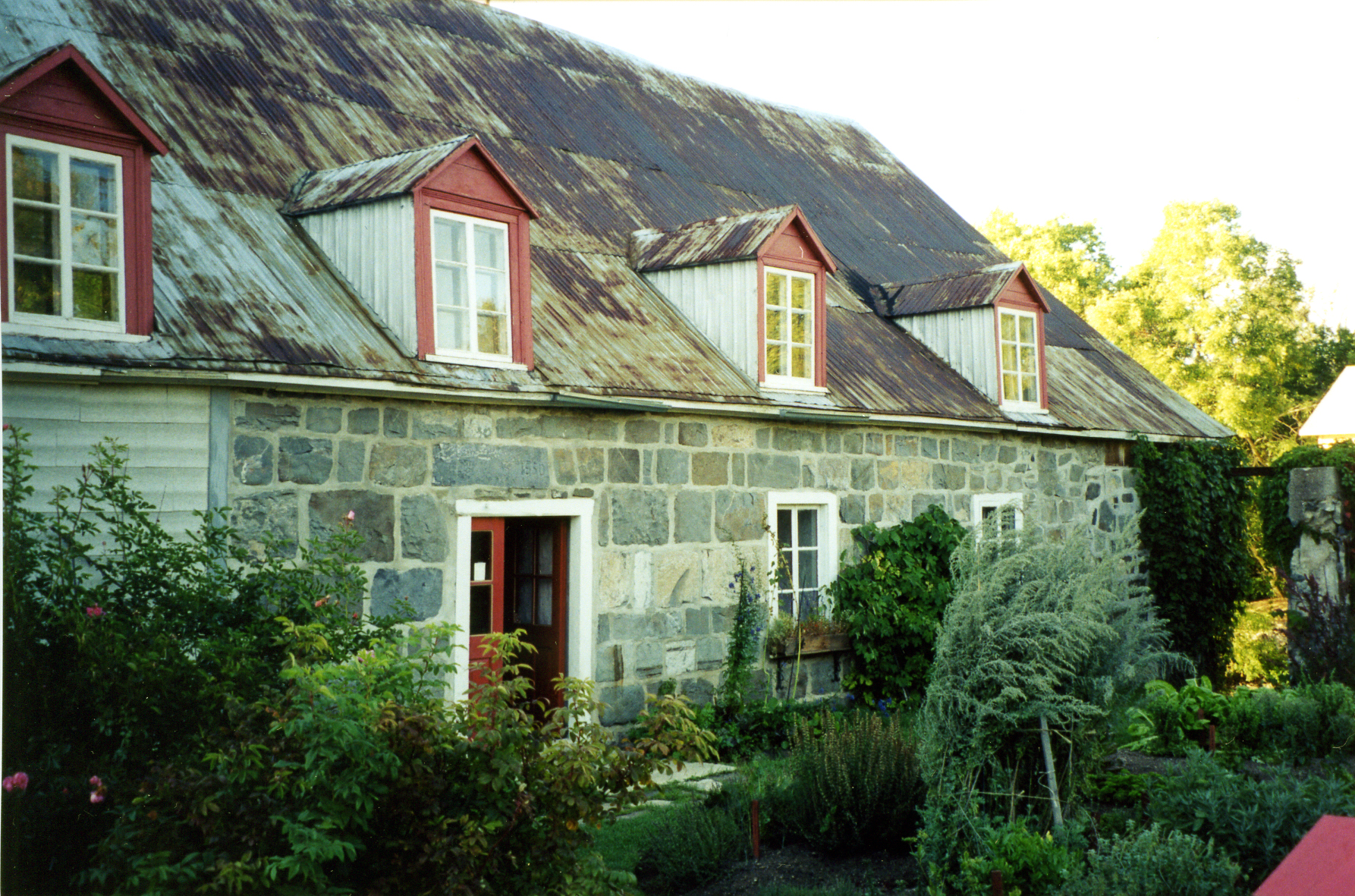
- 2001 photo of the Trois-Saumons River Mill, located in Saint-Jean-Port-Joli.
- Location: Saint-Jean-Port-Joli

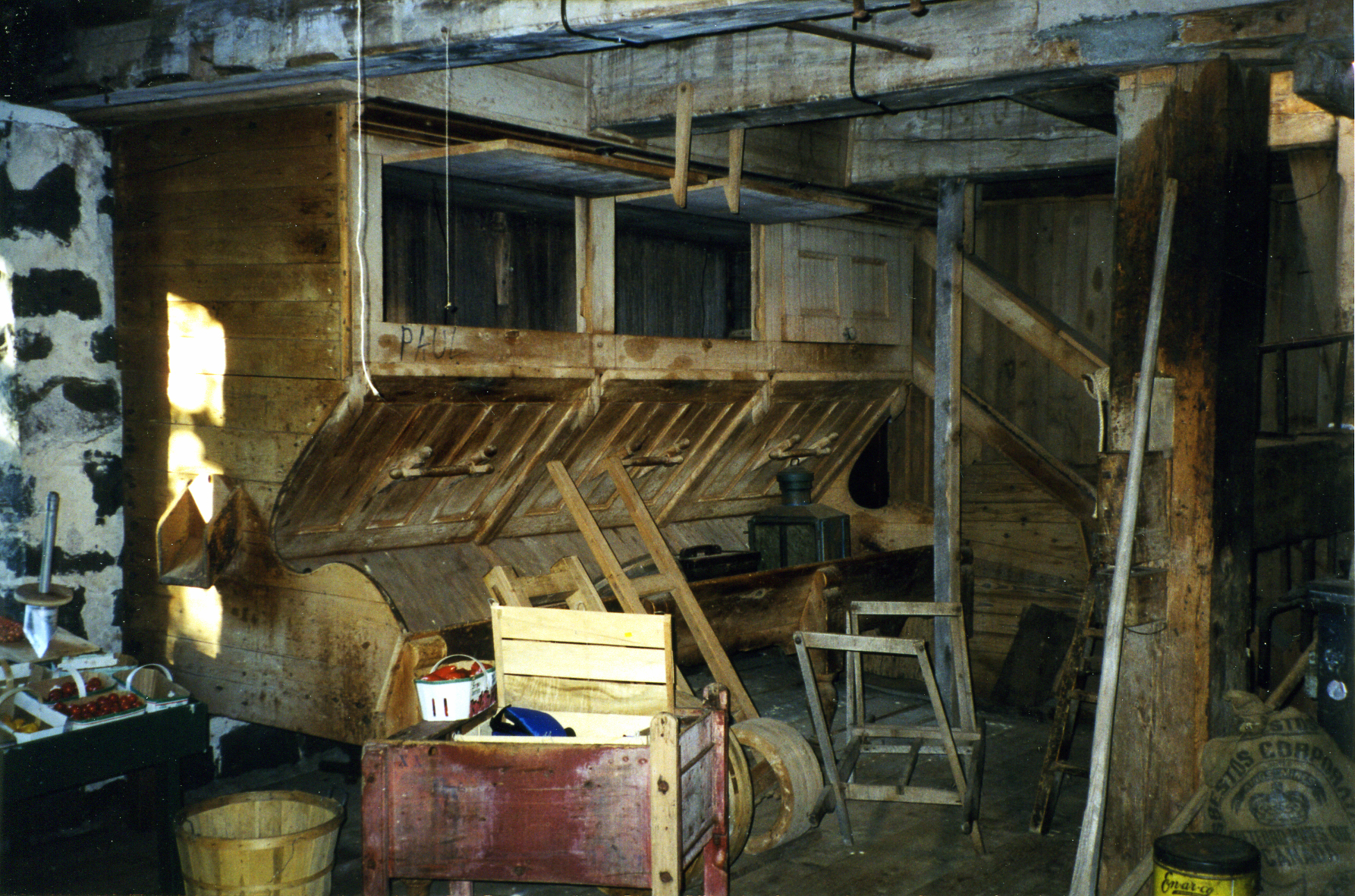
Bluteau of the Trois-Saumons river Mill, located in Saint-Jean-Port-Joli, in 2001

The Trois-Saumons river water mill in Saint-Jean-Port-Joli was already in operation during the French regime in New France. An 1815 engraving by Joseph Bouchette shows the Aubert de Gaspé mill surrounded by an important industrial establishment: the Harrower distillery. Around 1980, its owner, Mr. Edmond Hudon, then in his eighties, was still operating it, but in slow motion. At the time, this mill was one of the last water mills of Quebec and Canada.

The Trois-Saumons River Watermill in Saint-Jean-Port-Joli is located upstream from route 132.
