= Côte-du-Sud =

Provincial electoral district in Quebec, Canada

Coordinates: 47.342°N 69.687°W

Quebec electoral district

Provincial electoral district
- Legislature: National Assembly of Quebec
MNA
Frédéric Poulin
Conservative
- District created: 2011
- First contested: 2012
- Last contested: 2026

Demographics
- Population (2006): 64,187
- Electors (2014): 50,550
- Area (km²): 7,564.4
- Pop. density (per km²): 8.5
- Census division(s): Montmagny, L'Islet, Kamouraska
- Census subdivision(s): Berthier-sur-Mer, Cap-Saint-Ignace, Kamouraska, La Pocatière, Lac-Frontière, L'Islet, Mont-Carmel, Montmagny, Notre-Dame-du-Rosaire, Rivière-Ouelle, Saint-Adalbert, Saint-Alexandre-de-Kamouraska, Saint-André-de-Kamouraska, Saint-Antoine-de-l'Isle-aux-Grues, Sainte-Apolline-de-Patton, Saint-Aubert, Saint-Bruno-de-Kamouraska, Saint-Cyrille-de-Lessard, Saint-Damase-de-L'Islet, Saint-Denis-De La Bouteillerie, Sainte-Euphémie-sur-Rivière-du-Sud, Saint-Fabien-de-Panet, Sainte-Félicité, Saint-François-de-la-Rivière-du-Sud, Saint-Gabriel-Lalemant, Saint-Germain-de-Kamouraska, Sainte-Hélène-de-Kamouraska, Saint-Jean-Port-Joli, Saint-Joseph-de-Kamouraska, Saint-Just-de-Bretenières, Sainte-Louise, Sainte-Lucie-de-Beauregard, Saint-Marcel, Saint-Omer, Saint-Pacôme, Saint-Pamphile, Saint-Pascal, Saint-Paul-de-Montminy, Sainte-Perpétue, Saint-Philippe-de-Néri, Saint-Pierre-de-la-Rivière-du-Sud, Saint-Roch-des-Aulnaies, Tourville; Petit-Lac-Sainte-Anne, Picard

Côte-du-Sud (French pronunciation: [kot dy syd]) is a provincial electoral district in the Bas-Saint-Laurent and Chaudière-Appalaches regions of Quebec, Canada, which elects members to the National Assembly of Quebec. It includes the entire territory of the following regional county municipalities: Montmagny, L'Islet, Kamouraska. It notably includes the municipalities of Montmagny, La Pocatière, L'Islet, Saint-Pascal, Saint-Jean-Port-Joli, Cap-Saint-Ignace, Saint-Pamphile, Saint-Alexandre-de-Kamouraska, Saint-Pacôme and Berthier-sur-Mer.

It was created for the 2012 election from all of the former Montmagny-L'Islet and part of the former Kamouraska-Témiscouata electoral districts.

== Members of the National Assembly ==
Legislature	Years	Member	Party
Riding created from Montmagny-L'Islet and Kamouraska-Témiscouata
40th	2012–2014	Norbert Morin	Liberal
41st	2014–2018	Norbert Morin	Liberal
42nd	2018–2022	Marie-Eve Proulx	Coalition Avenir Québec
43rd	2022–2026	Mathieu Rivest	Coalition Avenir Québec
44th	2026–Present	Frédéric Poulin	Conservative

== Election results ==
2026 Quebec general election
The 2026 general election will be held on October 5.
Party	Candidate	Votes	%	±%
Conservative	Frédéric Poulin	15,161	42.34	
Parti Québécois	Valérie Hamel	8,560	23.91	
Coalition Avenir Québec	Mathieu Rivest	6,076	16.97	
Liberal	Nancy St-Pierre	3,967	11.08	
Québec solidaire	Jordan Veillette	2,041	5.70	
Total valid votes				
Total rejected ballots				
Turnout			71.73	
Electors on the lists				

2022 Quebec general election
Party	Candidate	Votes	%	±%
Coalition Avenir Québec	Mathieu Rivest	16,116	47.69	–5.95
Conservative	Frédéric Poulin	7,910	23.41	+21.66
Parti Québécois	Michel Forget	4,316	12.77	+2.66
Québec solidaire	Guillaume Dufour	3,154	9.33	–1.52
Liberal	Sylvain Lemieux	2,132	6.31	–15.68
Équipe Autonomiste	Sylvain Cloutier	164	0.49	New
Total valid votes		33,792	98.70	
Total rejected ballots		445	1.30	–0.31
Turnout		34,237	68.46	+1.63
Electors on the lists		50,010		
Coalition Avenir Québec hold		Swing		–13.80
Source: Élections Québec

2018 Quebec general election
Party	Candidate	Votes	%	±%
Coalition Avenir Québec	Marie-Eve Proulx	17,595	53.64	+30.37
Liberal	Simon Laboissonnière	7,212	21.99	-27.9
Québec solidaire	Guillaume Dufour	3,560	10.85	+5.36
Parti Québécois	Michel Forget	3,315	10.11	-9.01
Conservative	Marc Roussin	575	1.75	+0.97
Parti nul	Renaud Blais	304	0.93	-0.07
Bloc Pot	Gabriel Dubé	238	0.73	–
Total valid votes		32,799	98.39	
Total rejected ballots		538	1.61	
Turnout		33,337	66.83	-2.75
Eligible voters		49,881		
Coalition Avenir Québec gain from Liberal		Swing		+29.14
Source(s) "Rapport des résultats officiels du scrutin". Élections Québec.

2014 Quebec general election
Party	Candidate	Votes	%	±%
Liberal	Norbert Morin	17,348	49.88	+10.98
Coalition Avenir Québec	Mireille Caron	8,093	23.27	-6.51
Parti Québécois	André Simard	6,649	19.12	-6.62
Québec solidaire	Simon Côté	1,910	5.49	+2.11
Parti nul	Renaud Blais	347	1.00	–
Conservative	Gaétan Mercier	272	0.78	–
Option nationale	Joël Leblanc-Lavoie	158	0.45	-1.02
Total valid votes		34,777	98.87	
Total rejected ballots		398	1.13	-0.11
Turnout		35,175	69.58	-2.64
Electors on the lists		50,550	–	
Liberal hold		Swing		+8.74

2012 Quebec general election
Party	Candidate	Votes	%
Liberal	Norbert Morin	14,047	38.91
Coalition Avenir Québec	François Lagacé	10,751	29.78
Parti Québécois	André Simard	9,293	25.74
Québec solidaire	Josée Michaud	1,221	3.38
Option nationale	Marc-André Robert	532	1.47
Équipe Autonomiste	Serge Lévesque	259	0.72
Total valid votes		36,103	98.76
Total rejected ballots		454	1.24
Turnout		36,557	72.22
Electors on the lists		50,617	–

== See also ==
- List of Quebec provincial electoral districts
- Canadian provincial electoral districts
