= Marie-Eve Proulx =

Canadian politician

The Honourable Marie-Eve Proulx

Member of the National Assembly of Quebec for Côte-du-Sud
- In office October 1, 2018 – August 28, 2022
- Preceded by: Norbert Morin
- Succeeded by: Mathieu Rivest

Personal details
- Party: Coalition Avenir Québec

Marie-Eve Proulx is a Canadian politician, who was elected to the National Assembly of Quebec in the 2018 provincial election. She represents the electoral district of Côte-du-Sud as a member of the Coalition Avenir Québec and served as the Minister for Regional Economic Development from October 18, 2018 until her resignation on May 4, 2021, following several harassment complaints from her cabinet staff.

Quebec provincial government of François Legault
Cabinet post (1)
Predecessor	Office	Successor
Stéphane Billette	Minister for Regional Economic Development; October 18, 2018– May 4, 2021	Vacant
