= Mathieu Rivest =

Canadian politician

Member of the National Assembly of Quebec for Côte-du-Sud
- In office October 3, 2022 – October 5, 2026
- Preceded by: Marie-Eve Proulx
- Succeeded by: Frédéric Poulin

Personal details
- Born: 1976 Beauport, Quebec
- Party: Coalition Avenir Québec

Mathieu Rivest is a Canadian politician who was elected to the National Assembly of Quebec in the 2022 Quebec general election. He represented the riding of Côte-du-Sud as a member of the Coalition Avenir Québec.

Prior to his election to the legislature, Rivest was director of Camp Musical St-Alexandre, a music education camp for children.

== Electoral record ==
2022 Quebec general election: Côte-du-Sud
| Party | Candidate | Votes | % | ±% |
|---|---|---|---|---|
| Coalition Avenir Québec | Mathieu Rivest | 16,116 | 47.69 | –5.95 |
| Conservative | Frédéric Poulin | 7,910 | 23.41 | +21.66 |
| Parti Québécois | Michel Forget | 4,316 | 12.77 | +2.66 |
| Québec solidaire | Guillaume Dufour | 3,154 | 9.33 | –1.52 |
| Liberal | Sylvain Lemieux | 2,132 | 6.31 | –15.68 |
| Équipe Autonomiste | Sylvain Cloutier | 164 | 0.49 | New |
| Total valid votes | | 33,792 | 98.70 | |
| Total rejected ballots | | 445 | 1.30 | –0.31 |
| Turnout | | 34,237 | 68.46 | +1.63 |
| Electors on the lists | | 50,010 | | |
| Coalition Avenir Québec hold | | Swing | | –13.80 |
Source: Élections Québec
