= Berthier-sur-Mer =

- Municipality
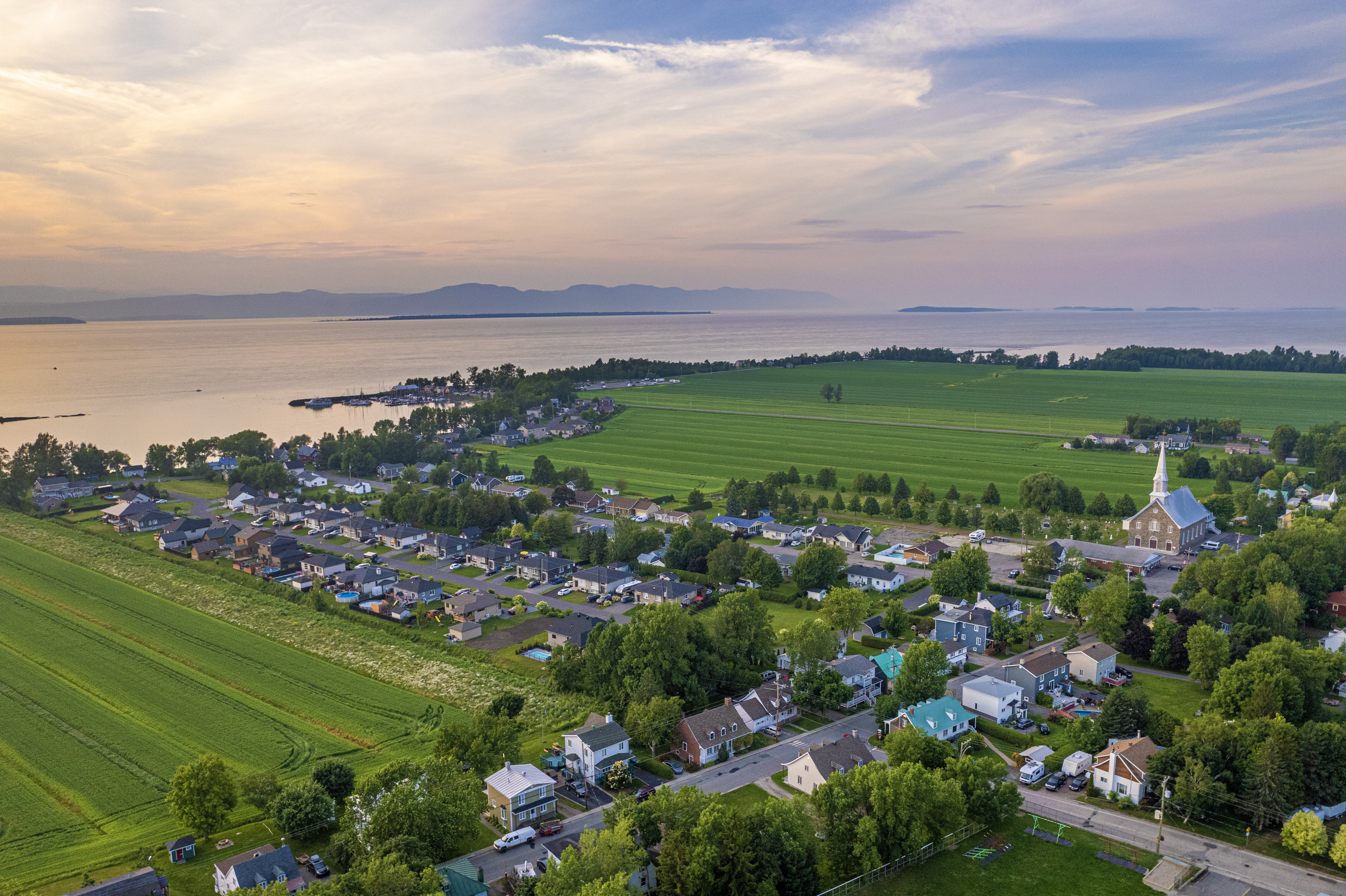
- Aerial view of Berthier-sur-Mer

- Coat of arms
- Motto: Sur terre et sur mer, Berthier toujours plus fier
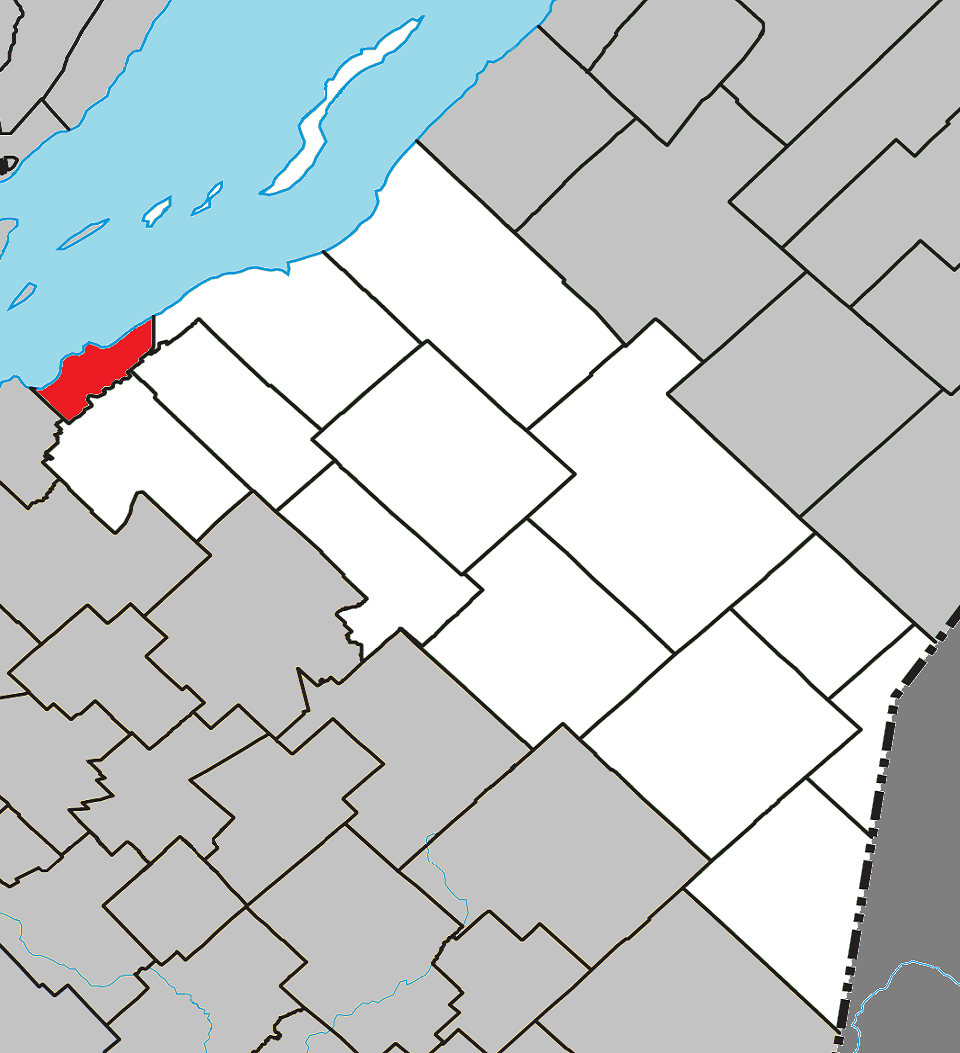
- Location within Montmagny RCM

- Location in province of Quebec
- Coordinates: 46°55′N 70°44′W
- Country: Canada
- Province: Quebec
- Region: Chaudière-Appalaches
- RCM: Montmagny
- Constituted: July 1, 1855

Government
  - Mayor: Richard Gallibois
  - Fed. riding: Côte-du-Sud—Rivière-du-Loup—Kataskomiq—Témiscouata
  - Prov. riding: Côte-du-Sud

Area
  - Total: 26.85 km^{2} (10.37 sq mi)
  - Land: 26.85 km^{2} (10.37 sq mi)

Population (2021)
  - Total: 1,744
  - Density: 65/km^{2} (170/sq mi)
  - Pop 2016-2021: ▲12.2%
  - Dwellings: 939
- Time zone: UTC−5 (EST)
  - Summer (DST): UTC−4 (EDT)
- Postal code(s): G0R 1E0
- Area codes: 418 and 581
- Highways A-20 (TCH): R-132
- Website: berthiersurmer.ca

Berthier-sur-Mer (French pronunciation: [bɛʁtje syʁ mɛʁ], lit. 'Berthier on Sea') is a municipality/town in the Montmagny Regional County Municipality within the Chaudière-Appalaches region of Quebec, Canada. It is located on the south shore of the St. Lawrence River, east of Quebec City on Route 132.

== History ==
Berthier-sur-Mer was named after Alexandre Berthier, a captain in the Carignan-Salières Regiment, who was given title to this area in 1672. A year later, Berthier acquired another concession in the Lanaudière region, and his seignories became known as Berthier-en-bas (Lower Berthier) and Berthier-en-Haut (Upper Berthier, now Berthierville).

In 1722, the Parish of Notre-Dame-de-l'Assomption-de-Bellechasse was created, but the place was called Berthier-en-bas in common use. In 1845, the Parish Municipality of Berthier en bas was formed, dissolved in 1847, and reestablished in 1855.

On August 29, 1971, the parish municipality was renamed to Berthier-sur-Mer, following the local practice of referring to the St. Lawrence River as a sea at this point due to its increasing width, tides, and salinity. On February 7, 2004, it changed statutes and became a regular municipality.

== Demographics ==
Canada census – Berthier-sur-Mer community profile

	2021	2016	2011
Population	1,744 (+12.2% from 2016)	1,555 (11.2% from 2011)	1,398 (12.8% from 2006)
Land area	26.85 km^{2} (10.37 sq mi)	26.92 km^{2} (10.39 sq mi)	26.79 km^{2} (10.34 sq mi)
Population density	65.0/km^{2} (168/sq mi)	57.8/km^{2} (150/sq mi)	52.2/km^{2} (135/sq mi)
Median age	49.6 (M: 48.4, F: 50.4)	50.3 (M: 50.3, F: 50.4)	49.7 (M: 49.8, F: 49.6)
Private dwellings	939 (total) 789 (occupied)	892 (total)	791 (total)
Median household income	$82,000	$70.336	$57,955

References: 2021 2016 2011

Historical census populations – Berthier-sur-Mer

Year	Pop.	±%
1871	1,411	—
1881	1,352	−4.2%
1891	1,152	−14.8%
1901	1,080	−6.2%
1911	928	−14.1%
1921	961	+3.6%
1931	880	−8.4%
1941	981	+11.5%

Year	Pop.	±%
1951	872	−11.1%
1956	892	+2.3%
1961	899	+0.8%
1966	970	+7.9%
1971	1,041	+7.3%
1976	1,141	+9.6%
1981	1,179	+3.3%
1986	1,216	+3.1%

Year	Pop.	±%
1991	1,135	−6.7%
1996	1,227	+8.1%
2001	1,307	+6.5%
2006	1,239	−5.2%
2011	1,398	+12.8%
2016	1,555	+11.2%
2021	1,744	+12.2%

Source: Statistics Canada

== Geology ==
A strip of underlying sedimentary bedrock maintains a relatively straight shoreline through which a natural harbour, round in shape, has been eroded. The bedrock is set at about a 60 to 80° angle and is composed of hundreds of thin layers of red shale interspersed every meter or so with 5 to 10 centimetres (2.0 to 3.9 in) layers of what appears to be limestone.

== Notable people ==
- Victor Allard, mayor of Berthier from 1899 to 1903 and from 1912 to 1915
- Camille Roy, literary critic
- Paul-Eugène Roy, Archbishop of Quebec
- Jean-Marc Vallée, filmmaker

== See also ==
- List of municipalities in Quebec
