= Frédéric Poulin =

Quebec politician

Frédéric Poulin MNA

Member of the National Assembly for Côte-du-Sud
- Incumbent
- Assumed office October 5, 2026
- Preceded by: Mathieu Rivest

Personal details
- Party: Conservative

Frédéric Poulin is a Quebec politician who was the elected to the National Assembly of Quebec for Côte-du-Sud in the 2026 Quebec general election as a member of the Conservative Party of Quebec. He was a candidate in 2022. He was mayor of Saint-Antoine-de-l'Isle-aux-Grues.

== Electoral record ==
2022 Quebec general election: Côte-du-Sud
Party	Candidate	Votes	%	±%
Coalition Avenir Québec	Mathieu Rivest	16,116	47.69	–5.95
Conservative	Frédéric Poulin	7,910	23.41	+21.66
Parti Québécois	Michel Forget	4,316	12.77	+2.66
Québec solidaire	Guillaume Dufour	3,154	9.33	–1.52
Liberal	Sylvain Lemieux	2,132	6.31	–15.68
Équipe Autonomiste	Sylvain Cloutier	164	0.49	New
Total valid votes		33,792	98.70	
Total rejected ballots		445	1.30	–0.31
Turnout		34,237	68.46	+1.63
Electors on the lists		50,010		
Coalition Avenir Québec hold		Swing		–13.80
Source: Élections Québec
