= Saint-Omer, Quebec =

Saint-Omer
- Municipality
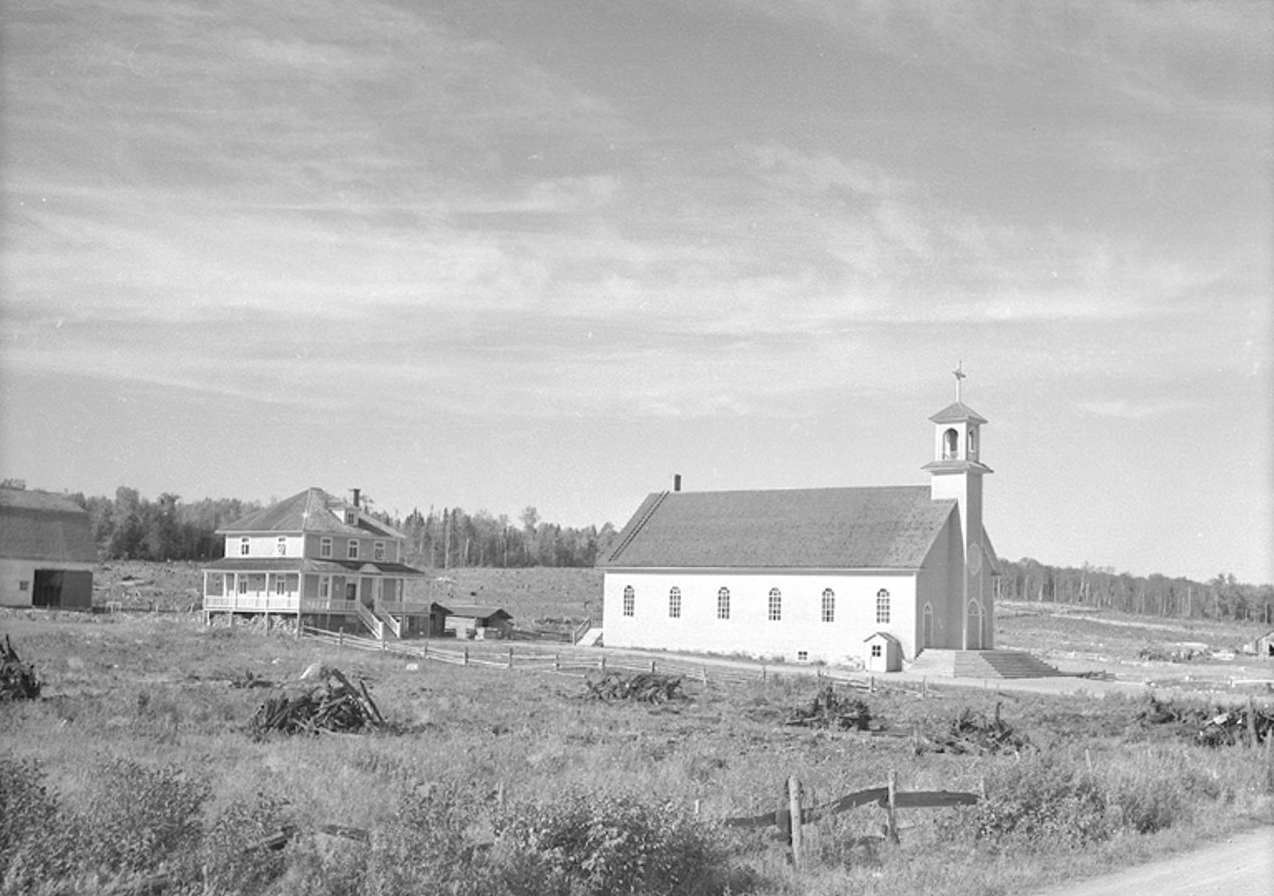

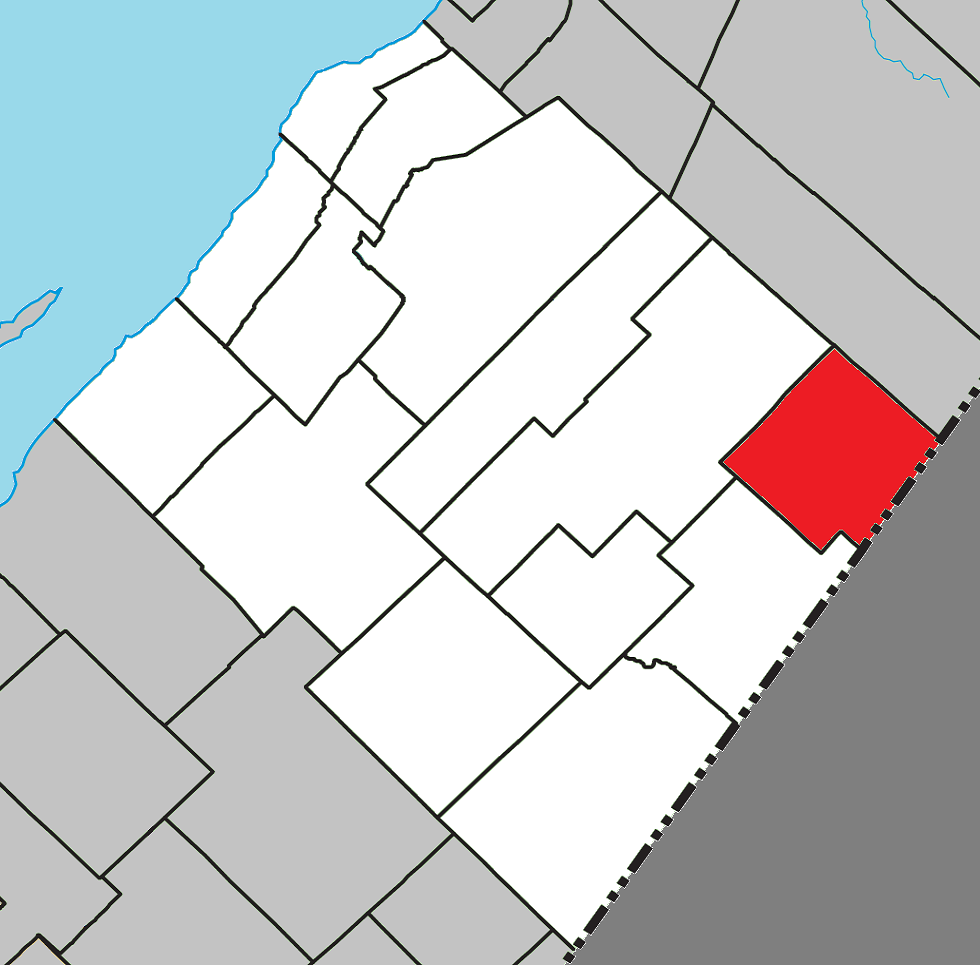
- Location within L'Islet RCM

- Location in southern Quebec
- Coordinates: 47°03′N 69°44′W
- Country: Canada
- Province: Quebec
- Region: Chaudière-Appalaches
- RCM: L'Islet
- Constituted: January 1, 1954

Government
  - Mayor: Nathalie Chouinard
  - Federal riding: Côte-du-Sud—Rivière-du-Loup—Kataskomiq—Témiscouata
  - Prov. riding: Côte-du-Sud

Area
  - Total: 122.40 km^{2} (47.26 sq mi)
  - Land: 122.44 km^{2} (47.27 sq mi)
- There is an apparent contradiction between two authoritative sources.

Population (2021)
  - Total: 294
  - Density: 2.4/km^{2} (6.2/sq mi)
  - Pop 2016-2021: ▲6.1%
  - Dwellings: 203
- Time zone: UTC−5 (EST)
  - Summer (DST): UTC−4 (EDT)
- Postal code(s): G0R 4R0
- Area codes: 418 and 581
- Highways: No major routes
- Website: www.st-omer.qc.ca

Saint-Omer is a municipality in L'Islet Regional County Municipality in the Chaudière-Appalaches region of Quebec, Canada.

== See also ==
- List of municipalities in Quebec
