= Saint-Aubert, Quebec =

Saint-Aubert
- Municipality
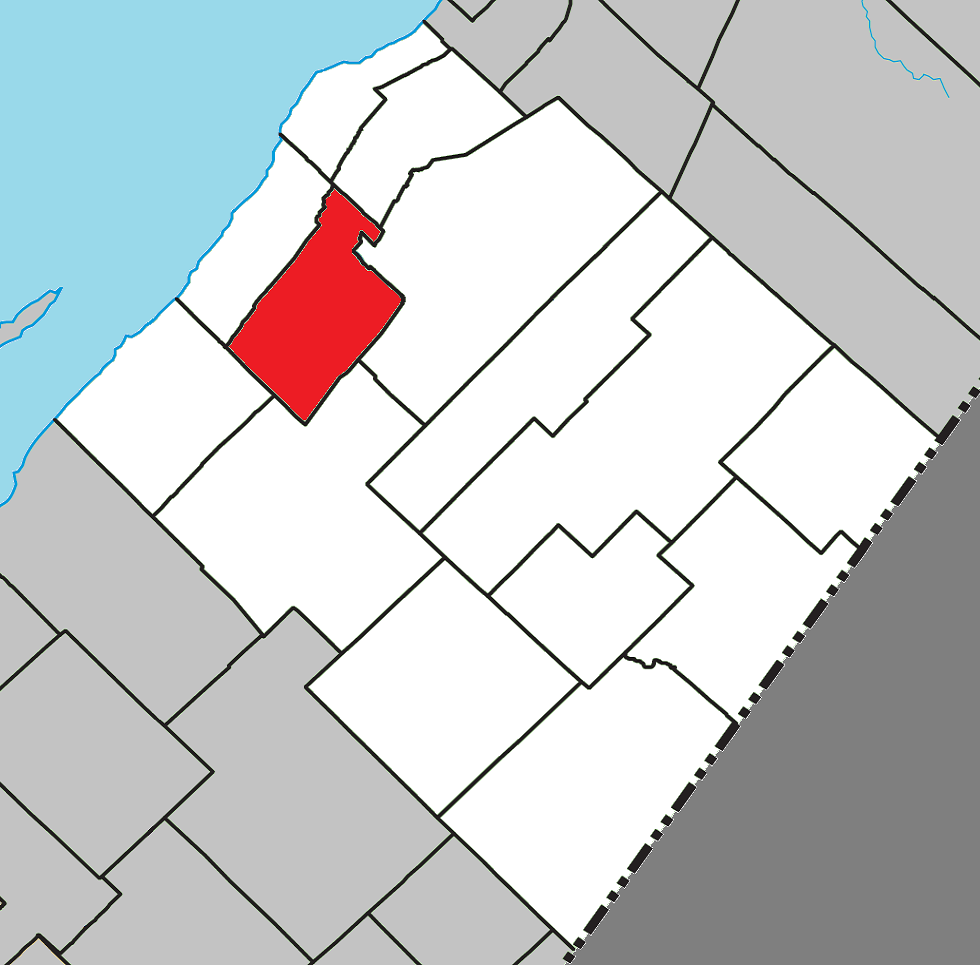
- Location within L'Islet RCM.

- Location in southern Quebec.
- Coordinates: 47°11′N 70°13′W
- Country: Canada
- Province: Quebec
- Region: Chaudière-Appalaches
- RCM: L'Islet
- Constituted: 1 July 1857

Government
  - Mayor: Ghislain Deschênes (2016-)
  - Federal riding: Côte-du-Sud—Rivière-du-Loup—Kataskomiq—Témiscouata
  - Prov. riding: Côte-du-Sud

Area
  - Total: 100.90 km^{2} (38.96 sq mi)
  - Land: 100.41 km^{2} (38.77 sq mi)

Population (2011)
  - Total: 1,409
  - Density: 14/km^{2} (36/sq mi)
  - Pop 2006-2011: ▼4.0%
  - Dwellings: 944
- Time zone: UTC−5 (EST)
  - Summer (DST): UTC−4 (EDT)
- Postal code(s): G0R 2R0
- Area codes: 418 and 581
- Highways: R-204
- Website: saint-aubert.net

Saint-Aubert (French pronunciation: [sɛ̃t‿obɛʁ]) is a municipality in Quebec, situated in the L'Islet Regional County Municipality and the Chaudière-Appalaches administrative region. Saint-Aubert lies in the Côte-du-Sud provincial electoral district.

== Geography ==
Saint-Aubert is situated between St-Jean-Port-Joli and Saint-Damase-de-L'Islet, not far from the southern coast of the Saint Lawrence River, some 100 kilometres (62 mi) from Quebec City. The landscape of Saint-Aubert is defined by its plateaus and hills. Near the village, one may find part of the Notre Dame Mountains, which are an extension of the Appalachians, as well as Three-Salmon Lake (Lac Trois-Saumons).

[Three-Salmon Lake is a]...stunning basin cut from the whiteness of quartz.

— Brother Marie-Victorin, Croquis laurentiens

== Economy ==
The village's primary activities are agriculture and maple syrup production. Many from outside the region also choose to spend their holidays here; there is a significant summer camp called Camp Trois-Saumons, which was founded in 1947 on the banks of its eponymous lake. Aside from these activities, the village does contain a number of small boutiques.

== History ==
In 1857, one year following the establishment of St-Aubert as a parish, the St-Aubert municipality was formed from the southern part of St-Jean-Port-Joli. The village was named in honour of Saint Aubert of Avranches, French bishop and founder of what went on to become the Mont Saint-Michel. However, the name was mostly chosen so as to honour Philippe-Joseph Aubert de Gaspé, lord of St-Jean-Port-Joli. Then-lawyer and sheriff of the Québec district, he was relieved of his responsibilities and found guilty of significant misappropriation of funds. He was imprisoned in 1838. In 1842, he moved to Quebec City and chose to spend his summers in St-Jean-Port-Joli. As he grew old, he published regionally renowned books Anciens Canadiens (1863) and Mémoires (1866). The people of St-Aubert went on to witness the tripling of their economy in agriculture, holiday-making, and maple syrup production. Shortly before his death, Elgin road (today known as Route 204) was constructed from St-Jean-Port-Joli to the Canada–US border; this facilitated the development of St-Aubert and other villages in the Côte-du-Sud.

The development of Saint-Aubert as a holiday-making destination took shape in 1904 with the opening of a fishing camp called Camp Maria-Joseph on Lac Trois-Saumons by the Notre-Dame-de-Bonsecours fishing club. The abundant fish on the lake (particularly trout) drew families from around the area, particularly from nearby L'Islet.

== See also ==
- Camp Trois-Saumons
- List of municipalities in Quebec
