= Sainte-Louise =

- Parish municipality
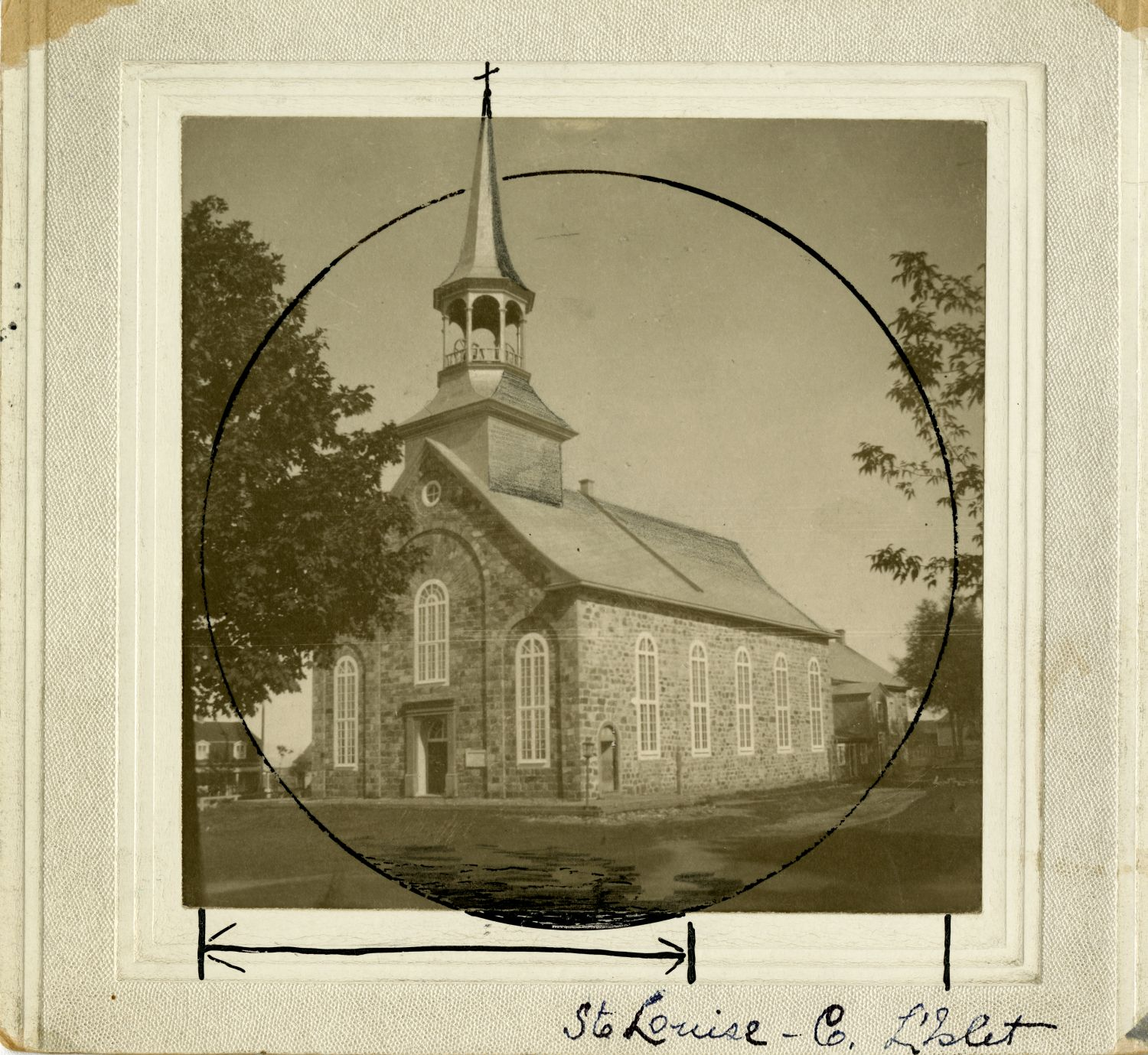

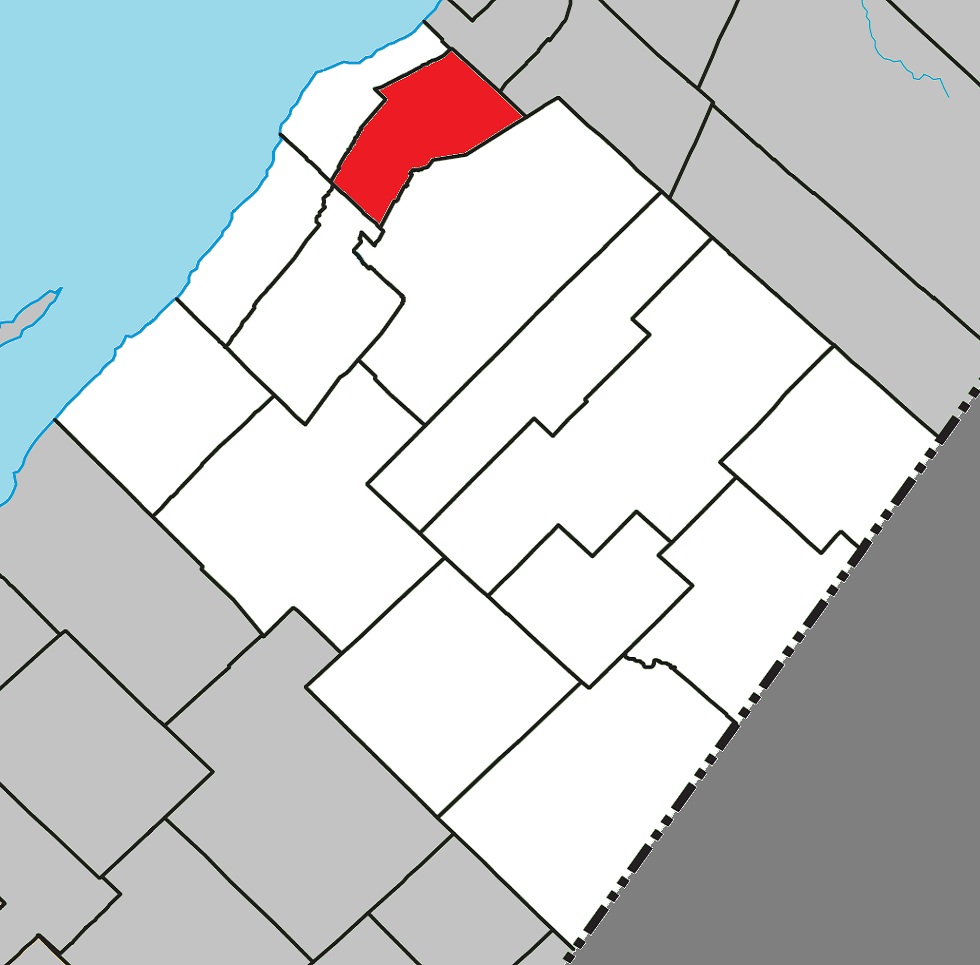
- Location within L'Islet RCM.

- Location in southern Quebec.
- Coordinates: 47°17′N 70°08′W
- Country: Canada
- Province: Quebec
- Region: Chaudière-Appalaches
- RCM: L'Islet
- Constituted: December 11, 1860

Government
  - Mayor: Normand Dubé
  - Federal riding: Côte-du-Sud—Rivière-du-Loup—Kataskomiq—Témiscouata
  - Prov. riding: Côte-du-Sud

Area
  - Total: 77.10 km^{2} (29.77 sq mi)
  - Land: 76.59 km^{2} (29.57 sq mi)

Population (2021)
  - Total: 674
  - Density: 8.8/km^{2} (23/sq mi)
  - Pop 2016-2021: ▲0.4%
  - Dwellings: 328
- Time zone: UTC−5 (EST)
  - Summer (DST): UTC−4 (EDT)
- Postal code(s): G0R 3K0
- Area codes: 418 and 581
- Highways: No major routes
- Website: www.saintelouise.qc.ca

Sainte-Louise (French pronunciation: [sɛ̃t lwiz]) is a parish municipality of 700 people in L'Islet Regional County Municipality, in Quebec, Canada.

== History ==
Sainte-Louise was created on 11 december 1860 when it separated from Saint-Roch-des-Aulnaies.

== Demographics ==
In the 2021 Census of Population conducted by Statistics Canada, Sainte-Louise had a population of 674 living in 301 of its 328 total private dwellings, a change of 0.4% from its 2016 population of 671. With a land area of 76.59 km^{2} (29.57 sq mi), it had a population density of 8.8/km^{2} (22.8/sq mi) in 2021.

== Notable people ==
The artist Michèle Lorrain resides in Sainte-Louise.

== See also ==
- List of municipalities in Quebec
