= Saint-Jean-Port-Joli =

- Municipality
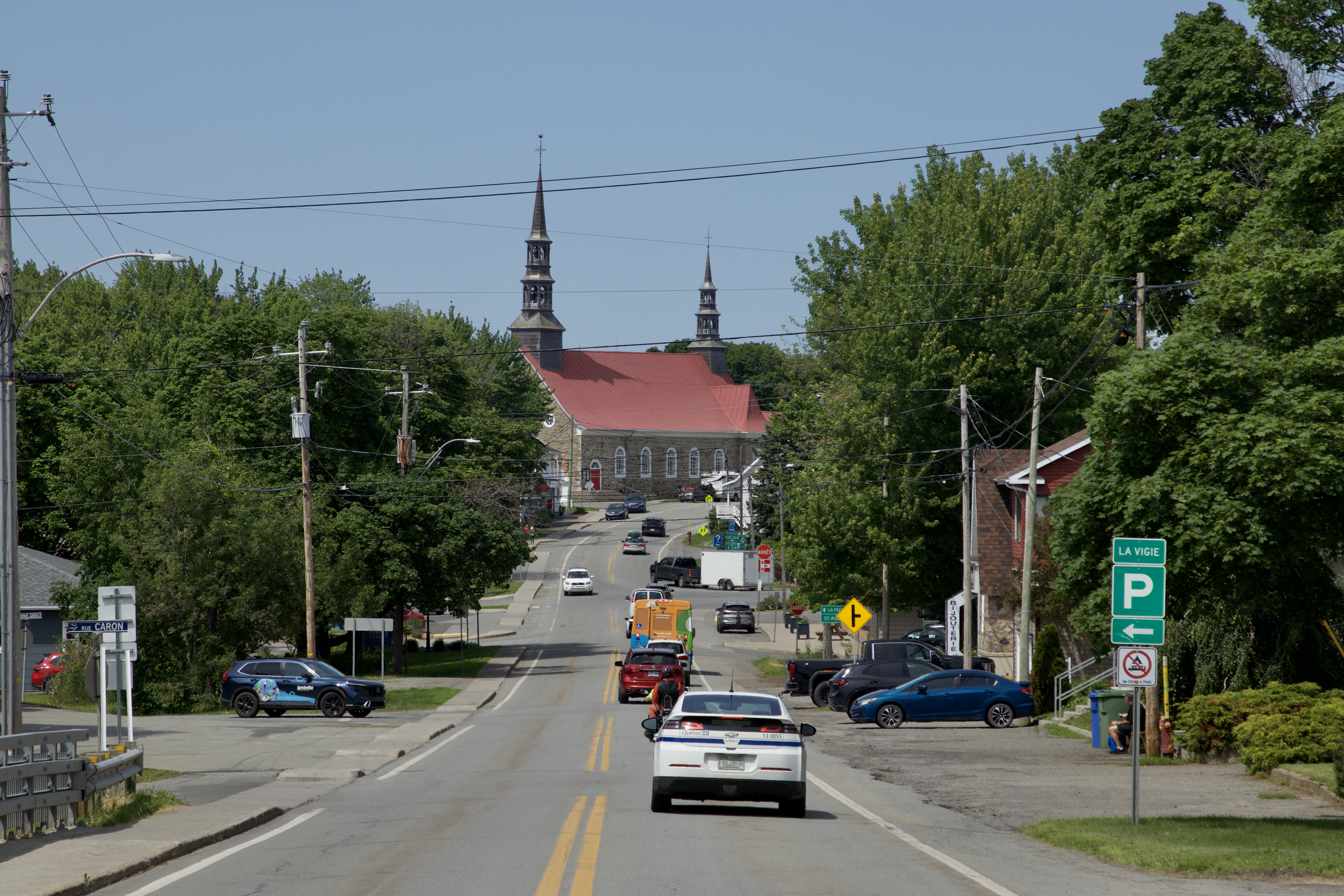

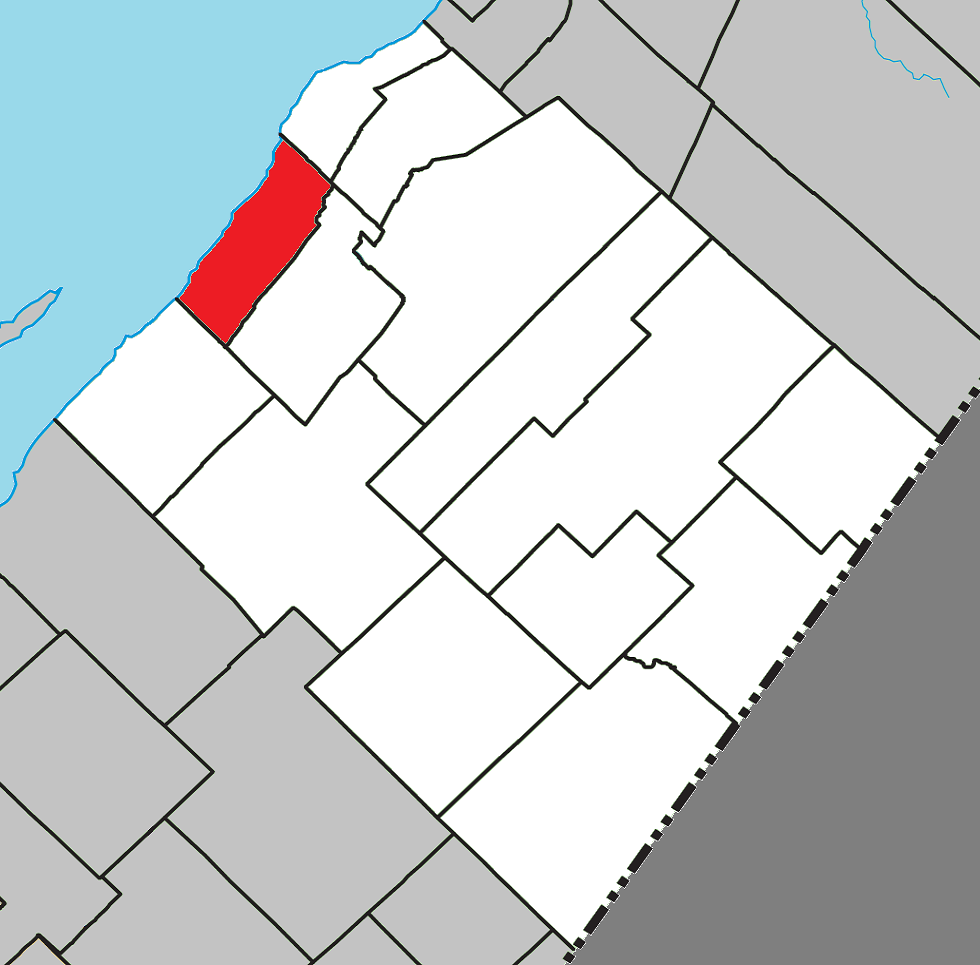
- Location within L'Islet RCM.

- Location in southern Quebec.
- Coordinates: 47°13′N 70°16′W
- Country: Canada
- Province: Quebec
- Region: Chaudière-Appalaches
- RCM: L'Islet
- Constituted: July 1, 1855

Government
  - Mayor: Normand Caron
  - Federal riding: Côte-du-Sud—Rivière-du-Loup—Kataskomiq—Témiscouata
  - Prov. riding: Côte-du-Sud

Area
  - Total: 240.90 km^{2} (93.01 sq mi)
  - Land: 68.95 km^{2} (26.62 sq mi)

Population (2011)
  - Total: 3,304
  - Density: 47.9/km^{2} (124/sq mi)
  - Pop 2006-2011: ▼1.8%
  - Dwellings: 1,658
- Demonym: Port-Jolien(ne)
- Time zone: UTC−5 (EST)
  - Summer (DST): UTC−4 (EDT)
- Postal code(s): G0R 3G0
- Area codes: 418 and 581
- Highways A-20 (TCH): R-132; R-204
- Website: www.saintjean portjoli.com

Saint-Jean-Port-Joli (French pronunciation: [sɛ̃ ʒɑ̃ pɔʁ ʒɔli]) is a village in the Regional County Municipality of L'Islet within the Chaudière-Appalaches region of Quebec, Canada. It is located on the south shore of the Saint Lawrence River and is the county seat. The village is located off the Trans-Canada Highway, Autoroute 20. Route 132 passes through the town.

It is known for its craftspeople and artists, especially in the fields of wood carving and sculpture. There are also several well-reputed restaurants.

== History ==
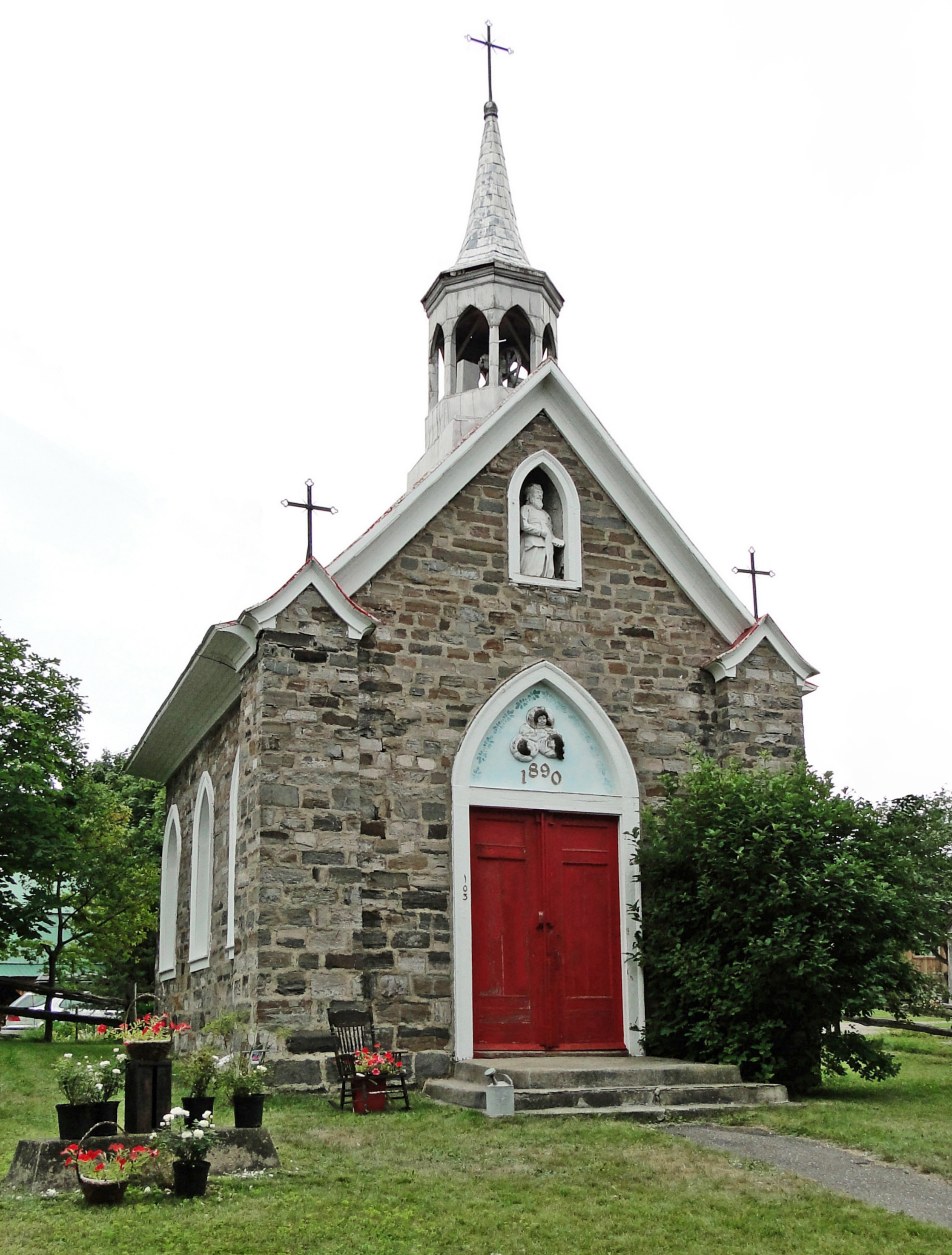
Processional chapel in Saint-Jean-Port-Joli

The village takes its name from the seigneury of Port-Joly, which was established in 1677. The Parish of St-Jean-Port-Joli was canonically established in 1721. The church, on which construction began in 1779, has unique architecture and houses many sculptures. The municipality was created in 1845 and became part of L'Islet County (a predecessor to the RCM of L'Islet) in 1847. In 1855, it became a parish municipality, and in 1857 it was split into the municipalities of St-Jean-Port-Joli and Saint-Aubert.

Like most other villages that lie in the Côte-du-Sud region between Rivière-Ouelle and Beaumont, most of its houses were burned down in September 1759. Under the orders of British general James Wolfe, the Fraser Highlanders regiment attacked the area during the Conquest of 1760 during the French and Indian War.

The tradition of wood carving began in the early 20th century with the Bourgault brothers, Médard, Jean-Julien and André.

== Tourist attractions ==
Despite its small population, the village is a relatively active tourist stop in the region, primarily due to the abundance of artesian wood carvers and cultural events. The village also includes a marina with access to the Saint Lawrence River at the site of the old wharf.

St-Jean-Port-Joli was awarded with the title of cultural capital of Canada in 2005.

=== Festival of sailors' songs ===
This festival highlights many aspects of the village's maritime heritage, legends, and songs. Also included in the weekend-long event is a dinner, workshops, literary contest, sailboat race, market, films, and expositions.

=== The autumn violins ===
This is an annual festival of music that has taken place since 1998. Every year in the month of September, fiddlers gather and play music from a wide variety of genres.

=== The winter festival ===
In the month of February, the Trois-Bérets park invites ice sculptors from around the world to display their talent. Additionally, the festival contains activities for the family in the daytime, such as helicopter rides, and concerts at night.

== See also ==
- List of municipalities in Quebec
