= Saint-Roch-des-Aulnaies =

- Municipality
- Municipalité de Saint-Roch-des-Aulnaies
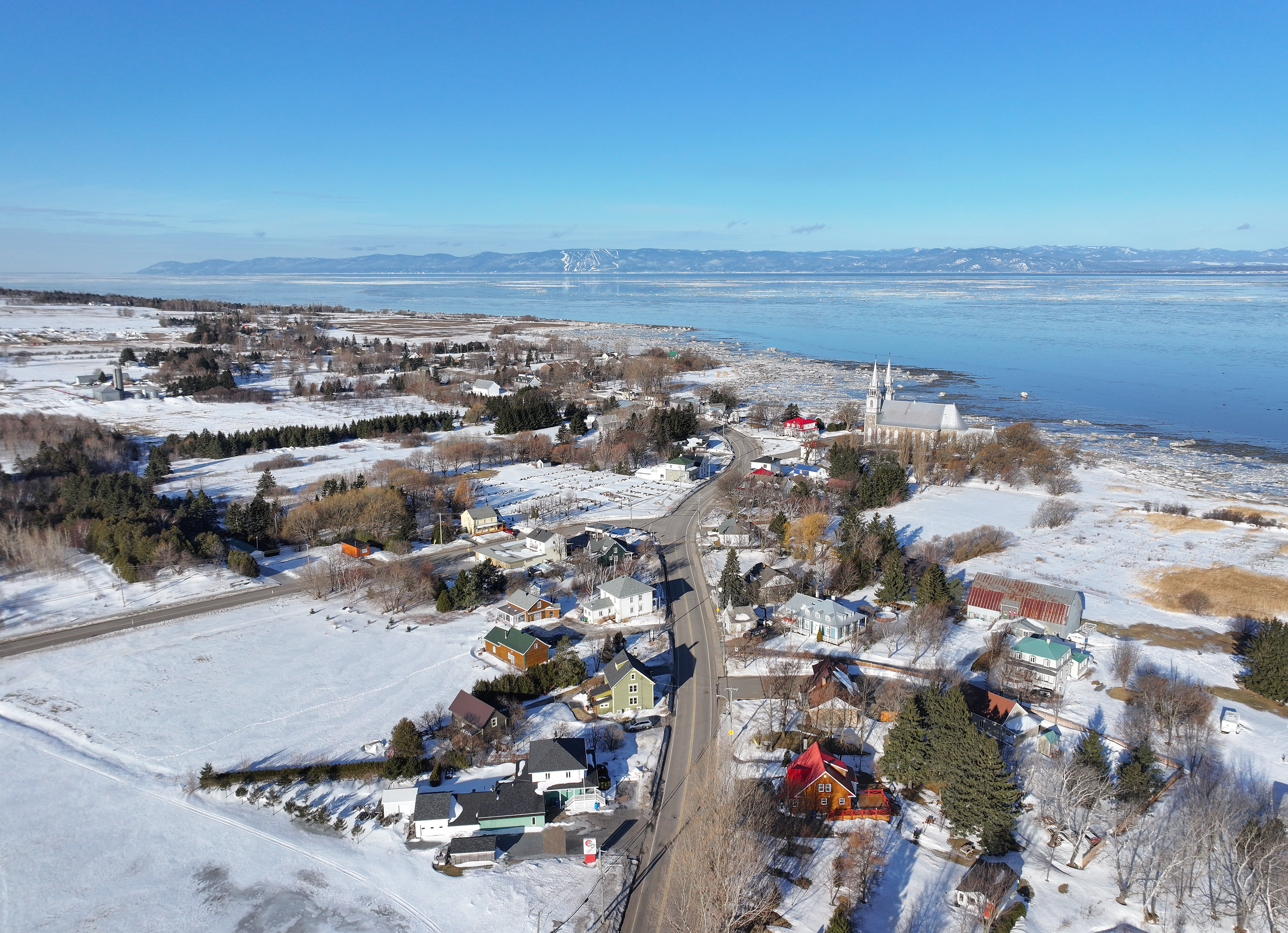
- Aerial view of Saint-Roch-des-Aulnaies
- Motto: Un patrimoire bâti sur des paysages exceptionnels
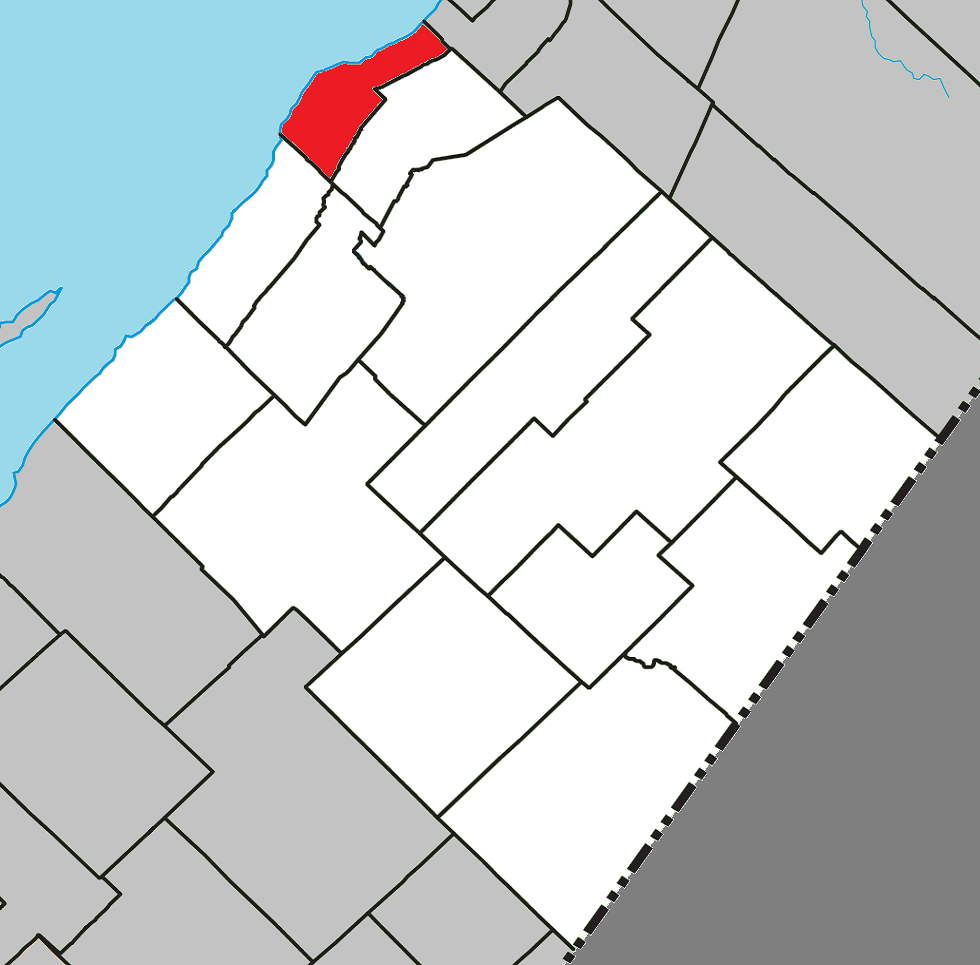
- Location within L'Islet RCM

- Location in southern Quebec
- Coordinates: 47°19′N 70°11′W
- Country: Canada
- Province: Quebec
- Region: Chaudière-Appalaches
- RCM: L'Islet
- Constituted: July 1, 1855
- Named for: Saint Roch and the numerous alders in the area

Government
  - Mayor: André Simard
  - Federal riding: Côte-du-Sud—Rivière-du-Loup—Kataskomiq—Témiscouata
  - Prov. riding: Côte-du-Sud

Area
  - Total: 162.40 km^{2} (62.70 sq mi)
  - Land: 49.14 km^{2} (18.97 sq mi)

Population (2021)
  - Total: 955
  - Density: 19.4/km^{2} (50/sq mi)
  - Pop 2016-2021: ▲4.1%
  - Dwellings: 552
- Time zone: UTC−5 (EST)
  - Summer (DST): UTC−4 (EDT)
- Postal code(s): G0R 4E0
- Area codes: 418 and 581
- Highways A-20 (TCH): R-132
- Website: www.saintroch desaulnaies.ca

Saint-Roch-des-Aulnaies is a municipality in Quebec, Canada.

== See also ==
- List of municipalities in Quebec
- Alexis Bélanger
