= Saint-Denis River =

River in MRC Kamouraska in Quebec, Canada

- Location within Quebec
- Native name: Rivière Saint-Denis (French)

Location
- Country: Canada
- Province: Quebec
- Region: Bas-Saint-Laurent
- MRC: Kamouraska Regional County Municipality

Physical characteristics
- Source: Agricultural streams
  - location: Saint-Gabriel-Lalemant
  - coordinates: 47.38582°N 69.833077°W
  - elevation: 74 metres (243 ft)
- Mouth: Kamouraska River
  - location: Saint-Bruno-de-Kamouraska
  - coordinates: 47.47972°N 69.79639°W
  - elevation: 152 metres (499 ft)
- Length: 21.9 kilometres (13.6 mi)

Basin features
- Tributaries
  - left: (upstream) cours d'eau Tardif, cours d'eau Marcel-Dionne, cours d'eau Roussel
  - right: (upstream) cours d'eau Ferré, cours d'eau Labrie, cours d'eau Pelletier, cours d'eau Dubé, cours d'eau Anctil, Bras de la Rivière Saint-Denis

The Saint-Denis River (in French: rivière Saint-Denis) is a tributary of the south-eastern shore of the Kamouraska River, which flows on the south shore of the St. Lawrence River two km to the east of the village center of Kamouraska.

The Saint-Denis river flows on the Côte-du-Sud in the municipalities of Saint-Gabriel-Lalemant, Mont-Carmel and Saint-Bruno-de-Kamouraska, in the Kamouraska Regional County Municipality, in the administrative region of Bas-Saint-Laurent, in province of Quebec, in Canada.

== Geography ==
Drawing its source from a marsh area in Saint-Gabriel-Lalemant, near the limit of Mont-Carmel, this watercourse generally flows towards the northeast. This spring is located 16.7 kilometres (10.4 mi) east of the south coast of the St. Lawrence River and 9.4 kilometres (5.8 mi) southeast of the center of the village of Saint-Gabriel-de-Kamouraska.

From its source, the Saint-Denis River flows over 21.9 kilometres (13.6 mi) in a forest and agricultural zone, divided into the following segments:

- 2.8 kilometres (1.7 mi) northward in Saint-Gabriel-Lalemant, up to the confluence of Bras de la Rivière Saint-Denis (coming from the southeast); this 4.0-kilometre-long (2.5 mi) arm has its source at Davidson Lake;
- 3.2 kilometres (2.0 mi) northward, to the southern limit of the municipality of Mont-Carmel;
- 2.8 kilometres (1.7 mi) towards the northeast in Mont-Carmel collecting the waters of Anctil brook, up to the route 287 bridge, either between the localities "Grand Bras" and "Bayonne";
- 3.5 kilometres (2.2 mi) northeasterly, up to the limit of Saint-Bruno-de-Kamouraska;
- 3.5 kilometres (2.2 mi) north-east, to the Petit-Moulin road bridge which crosses the village of Saint-Bruno-de-Kamouraska;
- 4.8 kilometres (3.0 mi) towards the north-west collecting the water from the Bouteillerie River, the Pelletier stream, the Marcel-Dionne stream, the Tardif water, from the Labrie stream, from the Ferré stream, to the Petit-Moulin road, which it crosses again;
- 1.3 kilometres (0.81 mi) westward, curving southward, to its confluence.

This confluence is located at 5.3 kilometres (3.3 mi) south of the village center of Saint-Pascal, at 3.9 kilometres (2.4 mi) north-west of the village center of Saint-Bruno-de-Kamouraska and 5.9 kilometres (3.7 mi) northeast of the center of the village of Mont-Carmel.

== Toponymy ==
The toponym "Saint-Denis river" is derived from the name of the municipality of the parish of Saint-Denis-De La Bouteillerie located further west, on the south coast of St. Lawrence River. The river tributary of the Bouteillerie is also derived from the name of this parish.

On the map of the township of Woodbridge (1882), the Saint-Denis river is designated the Plate river, characterizing its topographic profile with a low drop. Toponymic variant: rivière de Bayonne and Le Grand Bras.

The toponym "rivière Saint-Denis" was formalized on December 5, 1968, by the Commission de toponymie du Québec.

== See also ==
- List of rivers of Quebec
