= Bras de la Rivière Saint-Denis =

River in MRC Kamouraska in Quebec (Canada)

- Location within Quebec

Location
- Country: Canada
- Province: Quebec
- Region: Bas-Saint-Laurent
- MRC: Kamouraska Regional County Municipality

Physical characteristics
- Source: Mountain and forest streams
  - location: Mont-Carmel
  - coordinates: 47.324242°N 69.751812°W
  - elevation: 391 metres (1,283 ft)
- Mouth: Kamouraska River
  - location: Mont-Carmel
  - coordinates: 47.36389°N 69.81333°W
  - elevation: 203 metres (666 ft)
- Length: 11.8 kilometres (7.3 mi)

Basin features
- Progression: Saint-Denis River, Saint-Denis River, St. Lawrence River
- Tributaries
  - left: (upstream)
  - right: (upstream)

The Bras de la Rivière Saint-Denis is a tributary of the east bank of the Saint-Denis River which empties on the southeast bank of the Kamouraska River, which empties on the south shore of the St. Lawrence River two km east of the center of the village of Kamouraska.

The Bras de la Rivière Saint-Denis flows on the Côte-du-Sud in the municipalities of Mont-Carmel and Saint-Gabriel-Lalemant, in the Kamouraska Regional County Municipality, in the administrative region of Bas-Saint-Laurent, in province of Quebec, in Canada.

== Geography ==
Drawing its source from Lac des Marais (length: 0.8 kilometres (0.50 mi); altitude: 390 metres (1,280 ft)) in the municipality of Mont-Carmel, this watercourse flows generally to the north-west. This spring is located in the heart of the Notre Dame Mountains, at 21.9 kilometres (13.6 mi) east of the south coast of the St. Lawrence River, at 14.6 kilometres (9.1 mi) south-east of the center of the village of Saint-Gabriel-Lalemant and at 1.1 kilometres (0.68 mi) north of Chaudière lake which constitutes the head lake of Chaude River.

From its source, the Bras de la Rivière Saint-Denis flows over 11.8 kilometres (7.3 mi) entirely in a forest zone, divided into the following segments:

- 2.4 kilometres (1.5 mi) west in Mont-Carmel, to the Canadian National railway bridge;
- 2.6 kilometres (1.6 mi) north, to the mouth of Davidson Lake (length: 0.6 kilometres (0.37 mi); altitude: 325 metres (1,066 ft)) that the current crosses north; a marsh area borders the west side of the lake;
- 2.5 kilometres (1.6 mi) west, up to a forest road;
- 1.9 kilometres (1.2 mi) westward, to the southern limit of the municipality of Saint-Gabriel-Lalemant;
- 2.4 kilometres (1.5 mi) north, up to its confluence.

This confluence is located at 6.5 kilometres (4.0 mi) southwest of the center of the village of Saint-Bruno-de-Kamouraska, at 10.1 kilometres (6.3 mi) east of center of the village of Saint-Gabriel-de-Kamouraska and 6.0 kilometres (3.7 mi) southeast of the center of the village of Mont-Carmel.

== Toponymy ==
The toponym "Bras de la Rivière Saint-Denis" was formalized on December 2, 1982, by the Commission de toponymie du Québec.

== See also ==
- List of rivers of Quebec
