= Kamouraska River =

River in MRC Kamouraska in Quebec, Canada

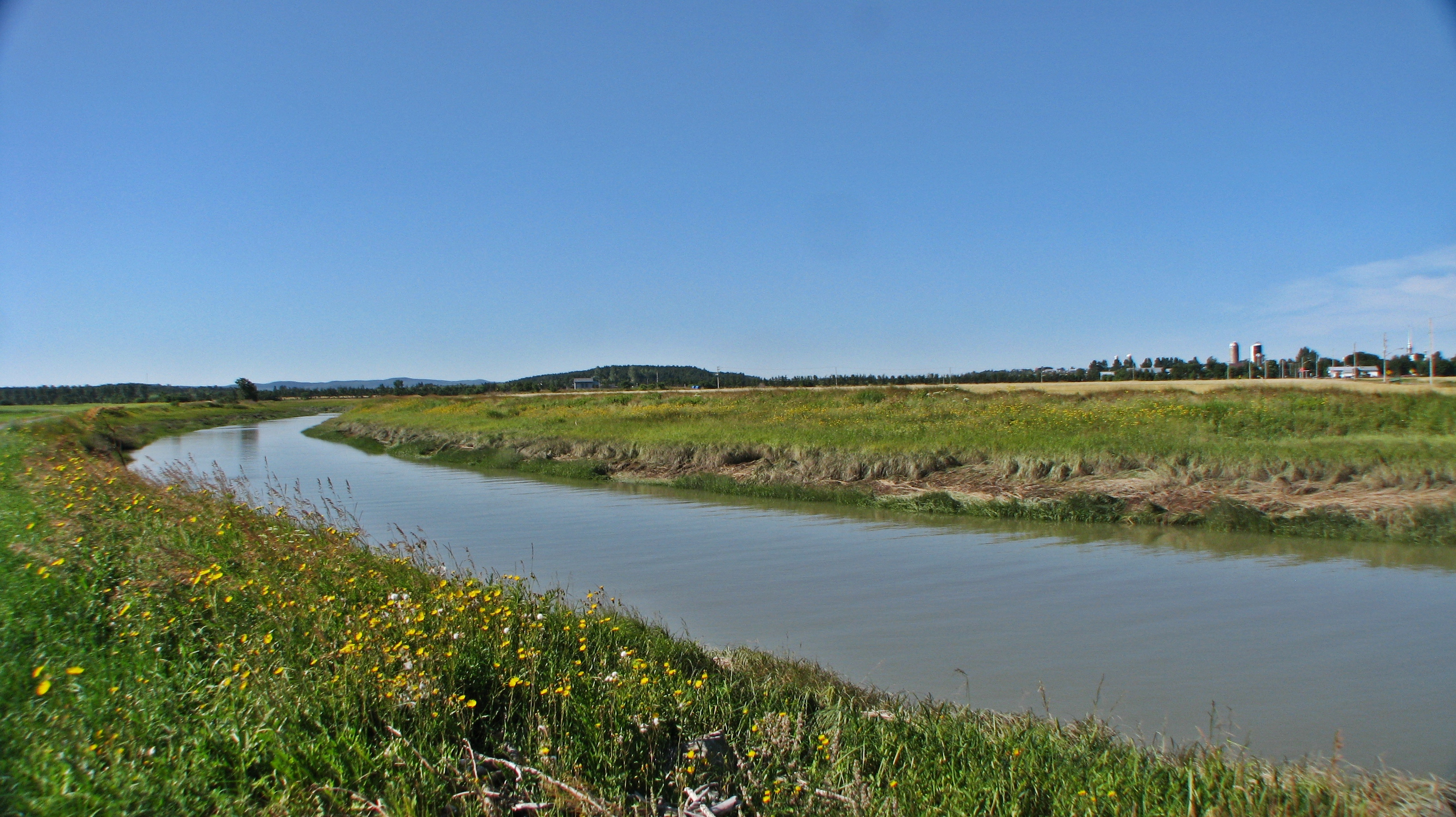

- Location within Quebec

Location
- Country: Canada
- Province: Quebec
- Region: Bas-Saint-Laurent
- MRC: Kamouraska Regional County Municipality

Physical characteristics
- Source: Forest and agricultural streams
  - location: Saint-Gabriel-Lalemant
  - coordinates: 47.372389°N 69.886973°W
  - elevation: 193 metres (633 ft)
- Mouth: St. Lawrence River
  - location: Kamouraska
  - coordinates: 47.57944°N 69.85638°W
  - elevation: 3 metres (9.8 ft)
- Length: 42.4 kilometres (26.3 mi)

Basin features
- Tributaries
  - left: (upstream) Dufour River
  - right: (upstream) Goudron River, Saint-Denis River

The Kamouraska river (French: rivière Kamouraska, pronounced [ʁivjɛʁ kamuʁaska]) is a tributary of the south shore of the St. Lawrence River where it flows two km east of the center of the village of Kamouraska. This river flows in the municipalities of Saint-Gabriel-Lalemant, Mont-Carmel, Saint-Bruno-de-Kamouraska, Saint-Pascla and Kamouraska, in the Kamouraska Regional County Municipality, in the administrative region of Bas-Saint-Laurent, in province of Quebec, in Canada.

== Geography ==
The Kamouraska River has its source in Rang Chénard, in the eastern part of the municipality of Saint-Gabriel-Lalemant. Its basin covers nearly 300 kilometres (186.41 mi), including the sub-basins of Dufour River, Saint-Denis and Tar River.

This source is located at 11.9 kilometres (7.4 mi) southeast of the south shore of the middle St. Lawrence estuary, at 6.2 kilometres (3.9 mi) south-east of the center of the village of Saint-Pacôme, 3.4 kilometres (2.1 mi) east of the center of the village of Saint-Gabriel-de-Kamouraska and 8.6 kilometres (5.3 mi) south of the center of the village of Mont-Carmel.

From its source, the Kamouraska River flows over 42.4 kilometres (26.3 mi), with a drop of 190 metres (620 ft), divided into the following segments:

- 3.9 km (2.4 mi) towards the northeast in Saint-Gabriel-Lalemant, to the limit of Mont-Carmel;
- 5.1 km (3.2 mi) towards the northeast¸ by collecting the Albert stream (coming from the north), up to route 287;
- 4.9 km (3.0 mi) northeasterly, collecting the Roussel stream, up to the limit between Mont-Carmel and Saint-Bruno-de-Kamouraska (Township of Woodbridge);
- 5.6 km (3.5 mi) north, crossing the Petit-Bras road, collecting water from the Saint-Denis river (coming from the east) and crossing under the bridge of another road, up to the limit of Saint-Pascal;
- 6.2 km (3.9 mi) (or 2.5 kilometres (1.6 mi) in a direct line) towards the north-west, forming a large loop to the north-east and crossing "Les Sept Chutes", until 'au chemin du 4th Rang Ouest;
- 3.6 km (2.2 mi) (or 2.1 kilometres (1.3 mi) in a direct line) north-west and crossing the Chute Dancauste, winding up to route 230;
- 1.7 km (1.1 mi) (or 1.1 kilometres (0.68 mi) in a direct line) towards the west, collecting the waters of the Dufour river (coming from the south), until the highway 20;
- 4.8 km (3.0 mi) (or 1.9 kilometres (1.2 mi) in a direct line) towards the north-west, winding up to the road of the Rang de l'Embarras;
- 2.6 km (1.6 mi) (or 2.3 kilometres (1.4 mi) in a direct line) towards the north-west, passing to the west of the mountain of Embarras and collecting the waters of the Lévesque watercourse, winding up to the Kamouraska road;
- 0.5 km (0.31 mi) north, to the limit of Kamouraska (municipality) (village);
- 3.5 km (2.2 mi) north-west into Kamouraska (municipality), the last 1.4 kilometres (0.87 mi) of which served as the old boundary between Kamouraska (village) and Saint-Louis-de-Kamouraska (parish); this segment crosses route 132, up to the confluence of the river.

The confluence of the Kamouraska River is located 7.3 kilometres (4.5 mi) west of the center of the village of Saint-Pacôme, at 6.4 kilometres (4.0 mi) north of the center of the village of La Pocatière and 3.2 kilometres (2.0 mi) north of the confluence of the Saint-Jean River (La Pocatière).

== Toponymy ==
The earliest use of the name “Kamouraska River” was noted in the deed of concession of the Kamouraska seigneury of July 15, 1674: “[…] three leagues of land abreast along of the St. Lawrence River, know: two leagues above the river called Kamouraska […]”. Since the 17th century, the name "Kamouraska River" has been found in dozens of documents and maps. About thirty official place names in Quebec contain the specific Kamouraska. The origin of this Native American term remains uncertain. This name could come from the Algonquin word akamaraska meaning "where there are rushes at the edge of the water". While in the Mi'kmaq language, this toponymic name is explained by the term kamoo, meaning "extended", and askaw, meaning "hay or rush".

In the history of this area, which dates back to the beginning of the French colony, the inhabitants have made use of about fifteen other appellations designating the Kamouraska River, some of which are still in popular use.

In the past, this waterway was designated "Pearl River" on maps. This toponymic variant was initially noted in the 1920s; it would come from the presence, at the time, of pearl mussels at the bottom of this stream. In the area upstream of the river, the tributaries were designated "Le Petit Bras" and Rivière du Petit Bras, toponymic usage beginning at the beginning of the 19th century. These variants would come from the confluence, in this sector, of the Kamouraska river and the Saint-Denis river, which was commonly referred to as “Le Grand Bras”.

The toponym “Kamouraska River” was formalized on March 7, 2006, by the Commission de toponymie du Québec.

== See also ==
- List of rivers of Quebec
