= Dufour River =

River in MRC Kamouraska in Quebec (Canada)

- Location within Quebec
- Native name: Rivière Dufour (French)

Location
- Country: Canada
- Province: Quebec
- Region: Bas-Saint-Laurent
- MRC: Kamouraska Regional County Municipality

Physical characteristics
- Source: Agricultural streams
  - location: Saint-Philippe-de-Néri
  - coordinates: 47.479608°N 69.845534°W
  - elevation: 74 metres (243 ft)
- Mouth: Kamouraska River
  - location: Saint-Pascal
  - coordinates: 47.51944°N 69.83583°W
  - elevation: 20 metres (66 ft)
- Length: 5.1 kilometres (3.2 mi)

Basin features
- Progression: Kamouraska River, St. Lawrence River
- Tributaries
  - left: (upstream)
  - right: (upstream) Ruisseau Creux

The Dufour River (in French: rivière Dufour) is a tributary of the east bank of the Kamouraska River, which empties on the south bank of the St. Lawrence River two km east of the center of the village of Kamouraska.

The Dufour river flows in the municipalities of Saint-Philippe-de-Néri and Saint-Pascal, in the Kamouraska Regional County Municipality, in the administrative region of Bas-Saint-Laurent, in province of Quebec, in Canada.

== Geography ==
The source of this river is located south of fourth rang, 6.7 kilometres (4.2 mi) southeast of Kamouraska bay, on the south shore of the St. Lawrence River, at 4.3 kilometres (2.7 mi) north of the village of Mont-Carmel, 3.0 kilometres (1.9 mi) east of the center of the village of Saint-Philippe-de-Néri and 5.9 kilometres (3.7 mi) southwest from the center of the village of Saint-Pascal. The Commission de toponymie du Québec assigns the status of a stream to this watercourse.

From its source, the Dufour River flows over 5.1 kilometres (3.2 mi), divided into the following segments:

- 1.1 kilometres (0.68 mi) north-east in Saint-Philippe-de-Néri, to the limit of Saint-Pascal;
- 2.6 kilometres (1.6 mi) north-east in Saint-Pascal collecting water from the Creux streams (coming from the south and drawing its source at Lake Saint-Pierre), up to the Beaulieu road;
- 1.4 kilometres (0.87 mi) north, to its confluence which is connected (on the southeast side) to the autoroute 20 bridge.

This confluence is 2.3 km (1.4 mi) west of the center of the village of Saint-Pacôme.

== Toponymy ==
The term "Dufour" constitutes a French Canadian surname.

The toponym “Rivière Dufour” was formalized on June 29, 1983, by the Commission de toponymie du Québec.

== See also ==
- List of rivers of Quebec
