= Quebec Autoroute 20 =

Highway in Quebec

Autoroute 20
- Route Transcanadienne
- Autoroute Jean-Lesage; Autoroute du Souvenir
- A-20 highlighted in red

Route information
- Maintained by Transports Québec
- Length: 641 km (398 mi)
- Existed: 1964–present

Main section
- Length: 542.5 km (337.1 mi)
- West end: Highway 401 at the Ontario border near Rivière-Beaudette
- Major intersections: A-30 in Vaudreuil-Dorion; A-13 in Montreal; A-15 in Montreal; A-10 in Montreal; A-25 (TCH) in Longueuil; A-30 in Sainte-Julie; A-55 in Drummondville; A-955 in Sainte-Eulalie; A-73 near Quebec City; A-85 (TCH) near Rivière-du-Loup
- East end: Route Drapeau in Notre-Dame-des-Neiges

Rimouski section
- Length: 45.2 km (28.1 mi)
- West end: R-132 near Rimouski
- East end: R-132 in Mont-Joli

Location
- Country: Canada
- Province: Quebec
- Major cities: Montreal, Longueuil, Brossard, Drummondville, Lévis

Highway system
- Trans-Canada Highway; Quebec provincial highways; Autoroutes; List; Former
← A-19	→ A-25

Autoroute 20 is a Quebec Autoroute, following the Saint Lawrence River through one of the more densely populated parts of Canada, with its central section forming the main route of the Trans-Canada Highway from the A-25 interchange to the A-85 interchange. At 585 kilometres (364 mi), it is the longest Autoroute in Quebec. It is one of two main links between Montreal and Quebec City; the other is the A-40.

There are two sections of the A-20, separated by a 57-kilometre (35 mi) gap. The main segment extends for 540 kilometres (335.5 mi) from the Ontario border to its current terminus at Trois-Pistoles. The second, more northerly section is far shorter (44 kilometres or 27 miles), constructed as a super two autoroute (one lane in each direction), which bypasses Rimouski to the south and ends at a roundabout junction with Highway 132 in Mont-Joli. While the Quebec government has completed environmental and economic reviews of the impact of linking the two sections of Autoroute 20, it has not committed the funds necessary for construction. Citing the high number of accidents on the Rimouski-Mont-Joli link of the A-20, many politicians in the Bas-Saint-Laurent region have criticized the government's lack of progress in linking the two sections of the autoroute and twinning the two-lane portion.

== Description ==
=== Autoroute du Souvenir ===
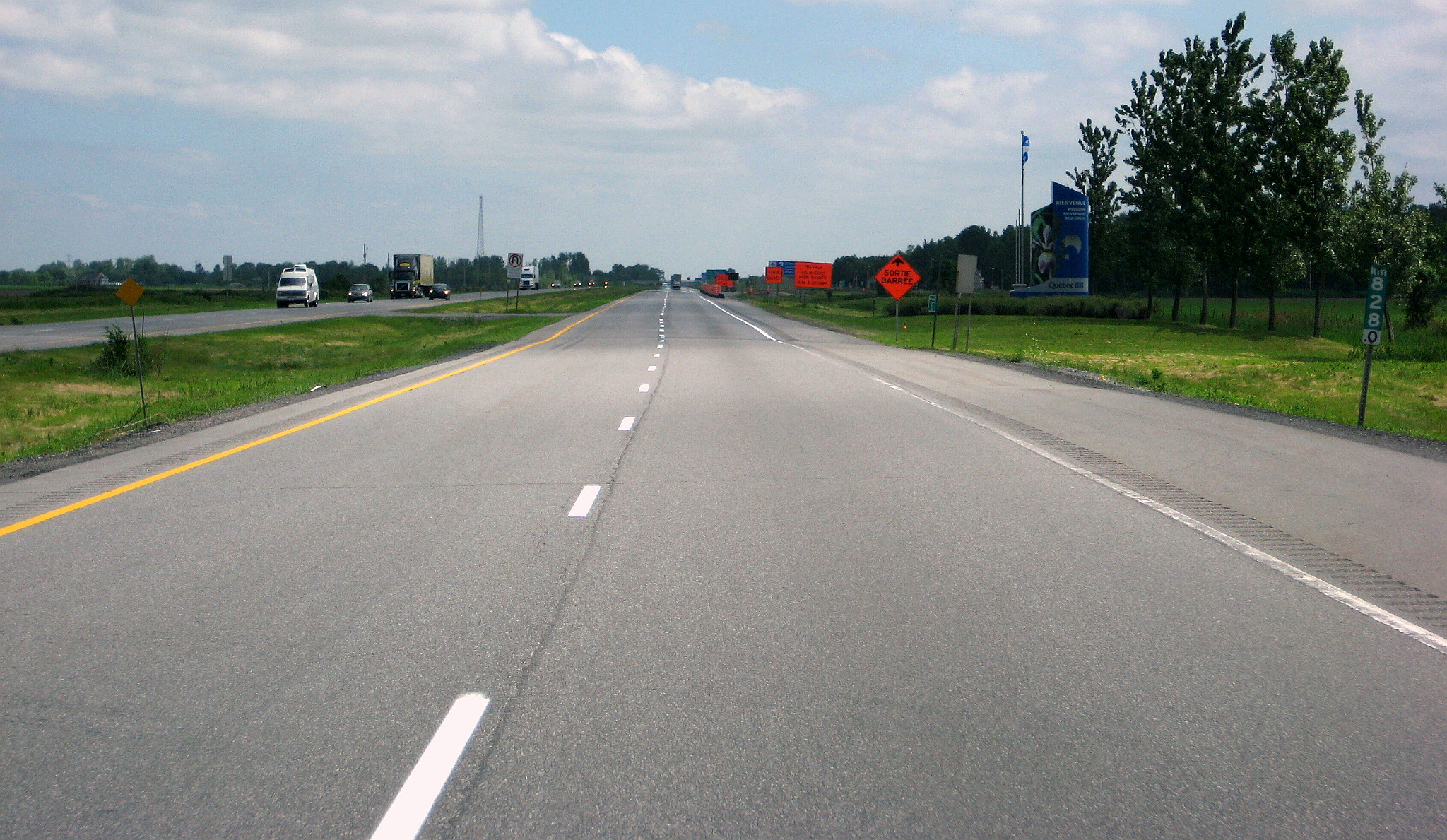
The ending of Ontario Highway 401 marks the beginning of Autoroute 20.

==== Montérégie ====
A-20 begins at the Ontario-Quebec border near Rivière-Beaudette as the continuation of Ontario Highway 401, which continues west to Toronto. The westernmost section of A-20 was named the Autoroute du Souvenir (Remembrance Highway) in 2007 to honour Canadian veterans. Road marker signs on this stretch of the autoroute feature a poppy (a traditional symbol of Remembrance in Canada).

At km 29, A-20 crosses A-30 (former A-540) before becoming an urban boulevard with at-grade intersections for approximately eight kilometres (5.0 mi) (km 30 to 38) in Vaudreuil-Dorion and L'Île-Perrot. This stretch of highway takes A-20 across the Ottawa River. The speed limit is 50 km/h (30 mph) in Vaudreuil-Dorion and 70 km/h (45 mph) in L'Île-Perrot. A-20 once again becomes a limited-access highway at km 38, just before crossing the Sainte-Anne-de-Bellevue Canal onto the Island of Montreal.

==== Montreal region ====
A-20 then traverses the West Island (in French, l'Ouest de l'Île) along the north shore of Lac Saint-Louis to an interchange with A-520. Commonly called the Dorval Interchange, this exit is the main access to Montreal's Trudeau International Airport. Further east, A-20 crosses the A-13 at its southern terminus, and then, at the St. Pierre Interchange, Route 138 west towards the Mercier Bridge.

From 1967 to 2020, between the Route 138 junction (a semi-directional T interchange) and the old Turcot Interchange, the carriageways of Autoroute 20 were "reversed" with the central median on the left-hand side, rather than on the right-hand side like the rest of the province and country. In 2020, as part of the reconfiguration of the Turcot Interchange, that segment of A-20 approaching the interchange was shifted north and rebuilt with the carriageways "unreversed" to follow conventional right-hand drive. Just west of downtown Montreal, A-20, A-15, and Route 136 (formerly Autoroute 720) meet at the Turcot Interchange.

From there, A-20 east is multiplexed with A-15 south on the approach to the Samuel-de-Champlain Bridge. This region is also the busiest section of the highway, with 145 000 cars on a daily average.

==== Longueuil ====
Multiplexed with A-10 and A-15, all three autoroutes cross the Saint Lawrence River via the Samuel-de-Champlain Bridge to Longueuil. The multiplex splits south of the bridge. The A-20 parallels the south shore of the river through suburban Longueuil. The junction with A-25 affords a direct connection to the Louis Hippolyte Lafontaine Bridge-Tunnel and Montreal's East End. The Trans-Canada Highway (TCH) joins A-20 at this junction.

=== Autoroute Jean-Lesage ===
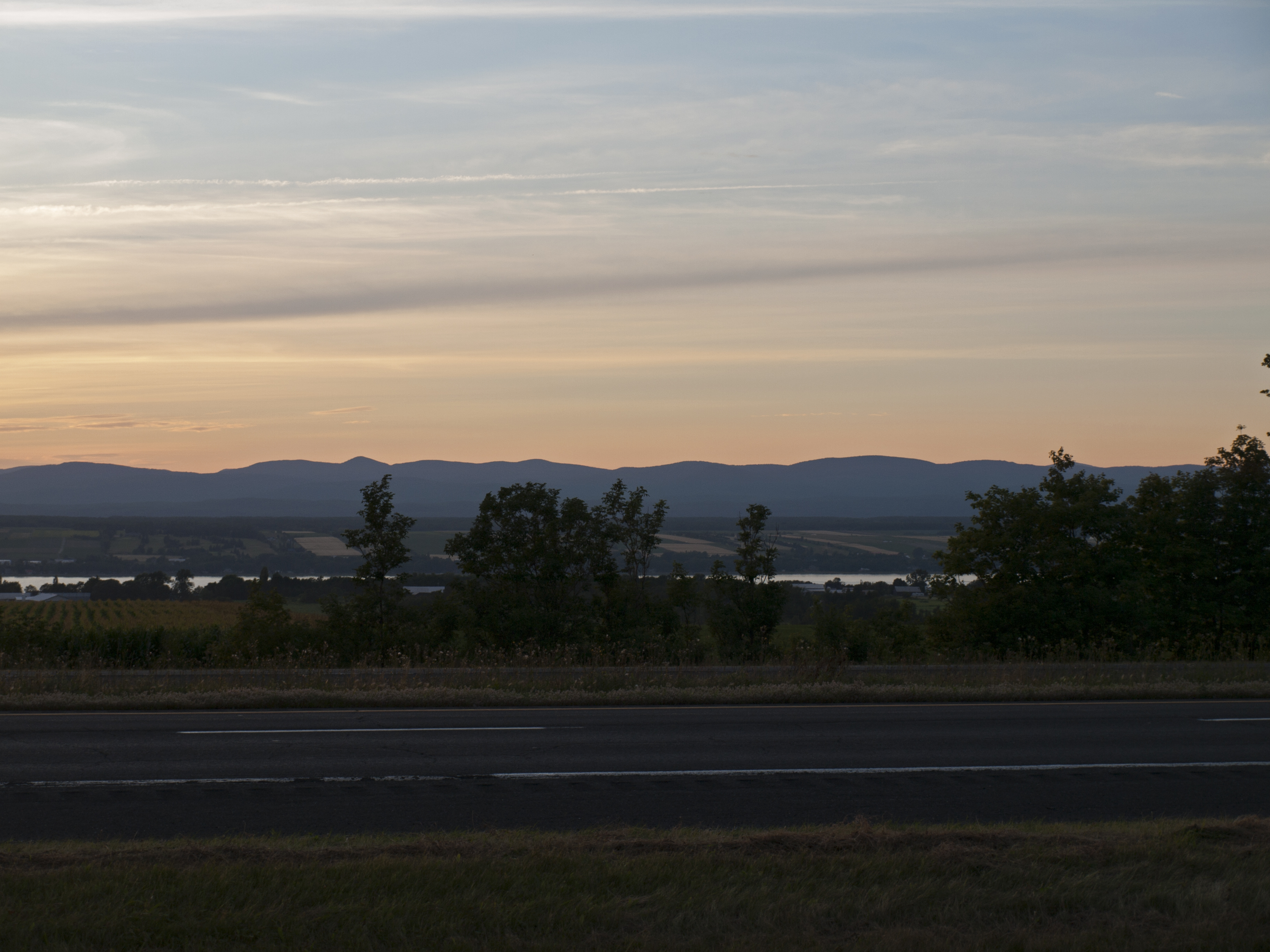
Autoroute 20 in Saint-Michel-de-Bellechasse with the Saint Lawrence River and the Laurentian Mountains at the background

The longest section of A-20 (from its junction with A-25 to its easternmost terminus) is named after Jean Lesage, who served as Premier of Quebec from 1960 to 1966, during the Quiet Revolution. Autoroute Jean-Lesage currently exists as two discontinuous sections separated by about 55 kilometres:

- The main section between the Louis-Hippolyte-Lafontaine Bridge-Tunnel and Trois-Pistoles in the Bas-Saint-Laurent region.
- A shorter section that serves as a bypass of Rimouski and extends east to a final terminus at Route 132 in Mont-Joli.

==== Main section ====
===== Centre-du-Québec =====
From the junction with A-25, A-20 travels east, away from the St. Lawrence River. At kilometre 98, A-20 intersects A-30 near Boucherville, crossing the Richelieu River (km 112) just north of Mont-Saint-Hilaire. Bypassing Saint-Hyacinthe, A-20 forms a multiplex with Route 116 for six kilometres between exits 141 and 147. This section of A-20 in Centre-du-Québec is located the furthest from the St. Lawrence River (approximately 45 kilometres). Between Drummondville and Sainte-Eulalie, A-20 forms a multiplex with A-55 for 37 kilometres.

===== Quebec City region =====
A-20 continues across the Great Lakes–St. Lawrence Lowlands and Quebec's agricultural heartland. The autoroute once again parallels the river as it approaches metropolitan Quebec City. From this point eastward, A-20 is never more than five kilometres from the river. At km 312, A-20 crosses the A-73, a north–south link between Saint-Georges and Quebec City via the Pierre Laporte Bridge. While the control city on A-20 is listed as "Québec", the autoroute never enters the city proper. Before departing the region, the freeway bypasses suburban Lévis.

===== Chaudière-Appalaches and Bas-Saint-Laurent =====
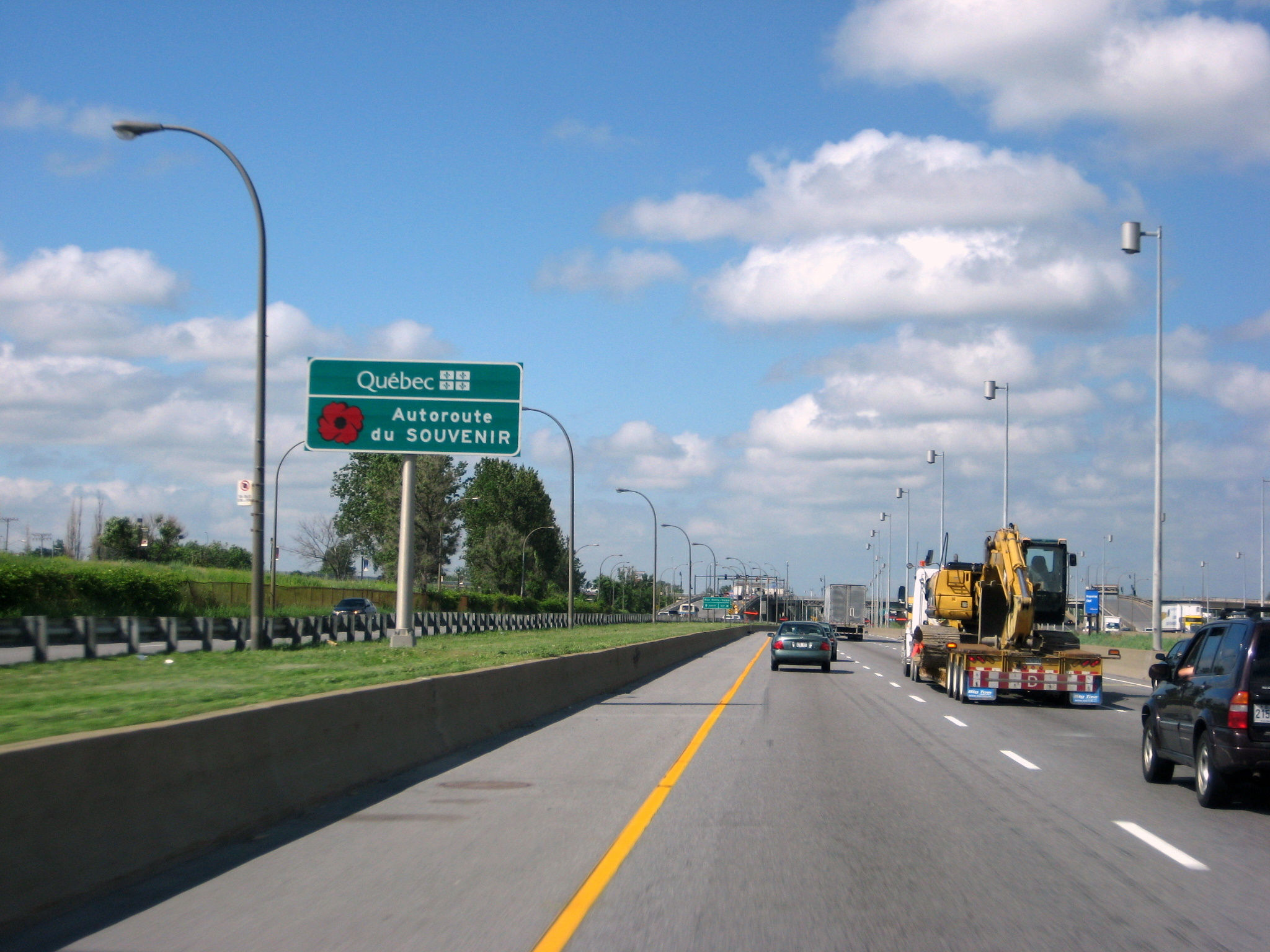
Old Autoroute 20 westbound in Montreal, ~km 66

As it continues eastward, A-20 passes the regional centres of Montmagny and La Pocatière before approaching Rivière-du-Loup and the junction with A-85 at km 499. The Trans-Canada Highway departs A-20 at this interchange and travels southeast on A-85 toward Edmundston, Fredericton, and Moncton, New Brunswick and the Maritime Provinces. At km 518, the highway becomes a super two for the remainder of its main section. The eastern end of the main section of the A-20 is located in Trois-Pistoles, approximately 40 kilometres east of Rivière-du-Loup.

==== Rimouski section ====
The second section of Autoroute Jean-Lesage (km 597 to km 641) connects Rimouski with Mont-Joli. It begins at a junction with Route 132 in Rimouski, approximately 55 km from the current terminus of A-20's main section. Like its larger counterpart, the Rimouski section of A-20 parallels the St. Lawrence, providing a southern bypass of Rimouski before ending (at another junction with Route 132) at the western approach to Mont-Joli.

This section of the A-20 is currently a single carriageway with occasional passing lanes. It was built to accommodate an eventual expansion to four lanes and most overpasses include the clearance needed to accommodate the additional lanes. The high accident rate along this section of A-20 have prompted many politicians to call for the highway to be expanded to two lanes in each direction.

An electric fence has been installed on both sides of the highway between km 621 and 628 to prevent moose from crossing the road, while at km 624 an underpass has been constructed to allow wildlife to pass under the highway safely.

== Future ==
Transports Québec (MTQ) is currently engaged in several projects designed to connect the two segments of A-20.

Long-range plans by the MTQ call for the two sections of A-20 to meet. A 9.8-kilometre section of single carriageway was opened to traffic on December 3, 2011 between Cacouna and L'Isle-Verte. As part of this project, a few kilometres of the highway near Cacouna was moved 1.5 km to the south and the old roadbed was destroyed. The MTQ timeline for completing the highway to Trois-Pistoles was met; it opened to traffic in November 2015. Overpasses were constructed for the St-Paul, St-Éloi and Drapeau roads.

Regarding the section from Trois-Pistoles to Rimouski, the Quebec government has completed environmental and economic reviews of the impact of linking the two sections of Autoroute 20, but it has not committed the funds necessary for construction. Frustrated by the long delay in linking the two sections of A-20, in 2013, the Mayor of Rimouski proposed paying for the construction by tolling the autoroute.

Citing predictions for an increase in ferry traffic to and from the Côte-Nord as a result of the Government of Quebec's Plan Nord, in 2011 the Mayor of Matane called for the further extension of A-20 to his city.

== Popular culture ==
Autoroute 20 serves as the backdrop to the popular 2002 Quebec film Québec-Montréal by Ricardo Trogi about seven twenty-something travellers driving between the two cities.

The Quebec French expression "à l'autre bout de la 20" (in English, at the other end of the 20) refers to Montreal when the speaker is in Quebec City, and to Quebec City when one is in Montreal.

== Other names ==
Older Anglophone Montrealers sometimes still refer to the section of the A-20 west of the city as Highway 2-20 (Note: A 1975 Montreal Star article refers to the route as "Highway 2-20".) (or "The Two and Twenty"), but the Route 2 designation was dropped in the mid 1970s.

== Exit list ==
RCM	Location	km	mi	Old exit	New exit	Destinations	Notes
Vaudreuil-Soulanges	Rivière-Beaudette	0.0	0.0		—	Highway 401 west – Cornwall, Toronto	Continuation into Ontario
Vaudreuil-Soulanges	Rivière-Beaudette	0.9	0.56	Rivière-Beaudette Service Centre (eastbound)			
Vaudreuil-Soulanges	Rivière-Beaudette	2.5	1.6		2	R-325 to R-338 – Rivière-Beaudette, Saint-Télesphore	
Vaudreuil-Soulanges	Saint-Zotique	5.3	3.3		6	69^{e} Avenue	
Vaudreuil-Soulanges	Saint-Zotique	9.2	5.7		9	Saint-Zotique, Saint-Polycarpe, Saint-Télesphore	
Vaudreuil-Soulanges	Les Coteaux	11.4	7.1		12	Les Coteaux	
Vaudreuil-Soulanges	Coteau-du-Lac	13.6	8.5		14	R-201 south – Pont Monseigneur-Langlois, Salaberry-de-Valleyfield	West end of R-201 concurrency
Vaudreuil-Soulanges	Coteau-du-Lac	16.4	10.2		17	R-201 north – Coteau-du-Lac, Saint-Clet	East end of R-201 concurrency
Vaudreuil-Soulanges	Coteau-du-Lac	18.6	11.6		19	Chemin Saint-Emmanuel	
Vaudreuil-Soulanges	Les Cèdres	21.5	13.4		22	Chemin Saint-Dominique	
Vaudreuil-Soulanges	Les Cèdres	25.0	15.5		26	Saint-Lazare, Les Cèdres	
Vaudreuil-Soulanges	Vaudreuil-Dorion	27.6	17.1		29	A-30 to A-40 – Sorel-Tracy, Ottawa/Gatineau, Montréal, Mirabel Airport	A-30 exit 5
Vaudreuil-Soulanges	Vaudreuil-Dorion	31.6	19.6		—	R-342 (Route Harwood)	At-grade intersection
Vaudreuil-Soulanges	Vaudreuil-Dorion	32.7	20.3		—	R-338 (Chemin de Lotbinière)	At-grade intersection
Vaudreuil-Soulanges	Vaudreuil-Dorion	33.3	20.7		—	Avenue Saint-Henri	At-grade intersection
Vaudreuil-Soulanges	Ottawa River	33.7– 34.2	20.9– 21.3	Taschereau Bridge			
Vaudreuil-Soulanges	Pincourt	34.3	21.3		35	Boulevard Cardinal-Léger – Terrasse-Vaudreuil, Pincourt	
Vaudreuil-Soulanges	Pincourt	35.3	21.9		—	Boulevard de l'Île	At-grade intersection. Entrance and exit to south only.
Vaudreuil-Soulanges	L'Île-Perrot	36.7	22.8		—	Boulevard Don-Quichotte	At-grade intersection
Vaudreuil-Soulanges	L'Île-Perrot	37.2	23.1		—	Boulevard Perrot	At-grade intersection
Vaudreuil-Soulanges	L'Île-Perrot	37.8	23.5		38	Chemin de L'Île-Claude, Rue de L'Île-Bellevue	Westbound exit and eastbound entrance
Ottawa River		38.1– 38.4	23.7– 23.9	Galipeault Bridge			
Montréal	Sainte-Anne-de-Bellevue	38.5	23.9		39	Sainte-Anne-de-Bellevue	
Montréal	Baie-D'Urfé	41.3	25.7		42	Rue Morgan	
Montréal	Beaconsfield	43.8	27.2		45	Avenue Woodland	
Montréal	Beaconsfield	47.2	29.3		48	Boulevard Saint-Charles	
Montréal	Pointe-Claire	48.7	30.3		49	Avenue Cartier	
Montréal	Pointe-Claire	49.9	31.0		50	Boulevard Saint-Jean	Westbound signed as exits 50-S (south) and 50-N (north)
Montréal	Pointe-Claire	51.5	32.0		51	Chemin du Bord-du-Lac	Eastbound exit and entrance
Montréal	Pointe-Claire	52.6	32.7		53	Boulevard des Sources	
Montréal	Dorval	53.8	33.4		54	Boulevard Pine Beach, Boulevard Fénelon	
Montréal	Dorval	54.9	34.1		56-E	A-520 east / Avenue Dorval – P.E. Trudeau Airport	Westbound signed as exit 56-E (east)
Montréal	Dorval	55.5	34.5		56-O	Boulevard Romeo Vachon, P.E. Trudeau Airport	Westbound exit and eastbound entrance, Westbound signed as exit 56-O (west)
Montréal	Montréal	57.5	35.7		58	55^{e} Avenue	
Montréal	Montréal	59.3	36.8		60	A-13 north / 32^{e} Avenue – Laval, Mirabel Airport	A-13 exit 1
Montréal	Montréal	61.0	37.9		61	Rue Norman	Westbound exit and entrance
Montréal	Montréal	61.9	38.5		62	1^{re} Avenue, Avenue Saint-Pierre, Avenue Dollard	Westbound exit via exit 63
Montréal	Montréal	62.7	39.0		63	R-138 west – Pont Mercier	West end of R-138 concurrency; R-138 exit 4
Montréal	Montréal	65.2	40.5		65	Rue Saint-Jacques (R-138 east) / Boulevard Angrignon	Eastbound, East end of R-138 concurrency, replaced Exit 64
Montréal	Montréal	66.2	41.1		65	Rue Notre Dame, Boulevard Angrignon	Westbound, replaced Exit 67
Montréal	Montréal	67.3	41.8		68 63	A-15 north (Autoroute Décarie) – Saint-Jérôme R-136 east (Autoroute Ville-Marie) – Montreal Centre-ville	Turcot Interchange; west end of A-15 concurrency; A-15 exit 63; exit numbers follow A-15
Montréal	Montréal	69.4	43.1		62	Boulevard de la Vérendrye, Avenue de l'Église	
Montréal	Montréal	70.6	43.9		61	Rue Atwater, Rue Saint-Patrick	
Montréal	Montréal	71.8	44.6		60	To A-10 west / Boulevard Gaétan-Laberge, Rue Wellington – Montreal Centre-ville	A-10 exit 4; eastbound access to A-10 west (unsigned)
Montréal	Montréal	74.0	46.0		58	A-10 west – Montreal Centre-ville, Île des Sœurs	Westbound exit and eastbound entrance; west end of A-10 concurrency; A-10 exit 5
Montréal	Montréal	74.0	46.0		57	Boulevard de Île des Sœurs, Chemin de la Pointe Nord	Eastbound exit and westbound entrance; signed as 57-S (south) and 57N (north)
Saint Lawrence River		74.4– 77.2	46.2– 48.0	Champlain Bridge			
Longueuil	Brossard	77.6– 79.1	48.2– 49.2		6 75	A-10 east to A-30 / I-89 – Sherbrooke, Québec, Vermont A-15 south / R-132 west to I-87 – La Prairie, New York	East end of A-10 / A-15 concurrency; west end of R-132 concurrency; eastbound signed as exit 6; westbound signed as exit 75; A-10 exit 6; A-15 north exit 53
Longueuil	Brossard	77.6– 79.1	48.2– 49.2		75	Boulevard Rome	Westbound exit; accessed from A-15 north / R-132 north exit 52
Longueuil	Brossard	77.6– 79.1	48.2– 49.2		—	Boulevard Marie-Victorin	Eastbound exit only
Longueuil	Saint-Lambert	79.5	49.4	1	76	Boulevard Simard	
Longueuil	Saint-Lambert	80.6	50.1	3	78	R-112 (Boulevard Laurier) – Pont Victoria, Montreal	Westbound signed as exits 78-O (west) and 78-E (east); eastbound access to R-112 west via exit 79
Longueuil	Saint-Lambert	82.9	51.5	6	79	Avenue Notre-Dame	
Longueuil	Longueuil	84.5	52.5	7	81	Boulevard Lafayette	Eastbound exit and entrance
Longueuil	Longueuil	85.2	52.9	8	82	R-134 (Boulevard Taschereau) – Pont Jacques-Cartier, Montreal	
Longueuil	Longueuil	88.5	55.0	11	85	Boulevard Roland-Therrien	
Longueuil	Longueuil	92.5	57.5	15; 90	89; 90	A-25 (TCH) north to A-40 – Tunnel Louis-H.-Lafontaine, Montreal R-132 east – Boucherville, Varennes	Trans-Canada Highway west end (continues on A-25 north); east end of R-132 concurrency; eastbound signed as exits 89-N (north) and 89-E (east); westbound signed as exit 90
Longueuil	Longueuil	92.7	57.6		90	Boulevard Marie-Victorin	
Longueuil	Longueuil	93.6	58.2		91	Boulevard Industriel, Rue Métropole	
Longueuil	Boucherville	94.3	58.6		92	Boulevard Mortagne	
Longueuil	Boucherville	95.1	59.1		93	Rue Nobel	Eastbound exit only
Longueuil	Boucherville	98.0	60.9		95	Boulevard de Montarville	
Longueuil	Boucherville	99.0	61.5		98	A-30 to A-10 – Saint-Hubert Airport, Brossard, Sorel-Tracy, Châteauguay, USA	A-30 exit 83
Marguerite-D'Youville	Sainte-Julie	101.5	63.1		102	Sainte-Julie, Saint-Amable, Saint-Bruno-de-Montarville	
La Vallée-du-Richelieu	Saint-Mathieu-de-Beloeil	104.8	65.1		105	R-229 – Saint-Basile-le-Grand, McMasterville	
La Vallée-du-Richelieu	Saint-Mathieu-de-Beloeil	109.1	67.8		109	Rue Saint-Jean-Baptiste – Beloeil, Saint-Mathieu-de-Beloeil	
La Vallée-du-Richelieu	Beloeil	112.4	69.8		112	R-223 (Rue Richelieu) – Beloeil, Saint-Marc-sur-Richelieu	
La Vallée-du-Richelieu	Mont-Saint-Hilaire	112.8	70.1		113	R-133 (Chemin des Patriotes) – Mont-Saint-Hilaire, Saint-Jean-sur-Richelieu, Saint-Charles-sur-Richelieu	
La Vallée-du-Richelieu	Mont-Saint-Hilaire	115.5	71.8		115	La Grande-Allée – Saint-Jean-Baptiste, Saint-Damase	
Les Maskoutains	Sainte-Marie-Madeleine	117.6	73.1	Sainte-Madeleine Rest Stop (eastbound); Hurons Rest Stop (westbound)			
Les Maskoutains	Sainte-Marie-Madeleine-Sainte-Madeleine boundary	119.8	74.4		120	R-227 – Sainte-Madeleine, Saint-Jean-Baptiste	
Les Maskoutains	La Présentation	123.1	76.5		123	Grand Rang – La Présentation, Saint-Hyacinthe	
Les Maskoutains	Saint-Hyacinthe	128.6	79.9		128	Avenue Pinard	
Les Maskoutains	Saint-Hyacinthe	130.6	81.2		130	R-137 / R-235 – Saint-Hyacinthe, Granby, Saint-Denis-sur-Richelieu	Signed as exits 130S (south) and 130N (north)
Les Maskoutains	Saint-Hyacinthe	130.9	81.3	At-grade railway level crossing			
Les Maskoutains	Saint-Hyacinthe	133.6	83.0		133	Rue Girouard – Saint-Hyacinthe	
Les Maskoutains	Saint-Hyacinthe	134.0	83.3		134	Rue Yamaska – Saint-Hyacinthe	
Les Maskoutains	Saint-Hyacinthe	137.9	85.7		138	R-224 – Saint-Hyacinthe, Saint-Simon	
Les Maskoutains	Saint-Simon	141.7	88.0		141	R-116 west to R-137 south – Saint-Hyacinthe, Granby	West end of R-116 concurrency
Les Maskoutains	Saint-Simon	142.5	88.5		143	R-211 to Saint-Valérien-de-Milton	
Les Maskoutains	Saint-Simon–Saint-Liboire boundary	145.0	90.1		145	Saint-Simon, Saint-Liboire	
Les Maskoutains	Saint-Simon–Saint-Liboire boundary	146.4	91.0		147	R-116 east – Upton, Acton Vale	East end of R-116 concurrency
Les Maskoutains	Sainte-Hélène-de-Bagot	150.3	93.4		150	Saint-Hugues	
Les Maskoutains	Sainte-Hélène-de-Bagot	152.4	94.7		152	Sainte-Hélène-de-Bagot	
Acton	Saint-Nazaire-d'Acton	156.1	97.0	Saint-Nazaire-d'Acton Rest Stop (westbound)			
Acton	Saint-Nazaire-d'Acton	156.9	97.5		157	Saint-Nazaire-d'Acton, Wickham	
Drummond	Saint-Eugène	160.6	99.8		160	R-239 – Saint-Eugène, Saint-Guillaume	
Drummond	Saint-Germain-de-Grantham	165.7	103.0		166	10^{e} Rang de Saint-Germain-de-Grantham	
Drummond	Saint-Germain-de-Grantham	170.3	105.8		170	R-122 – Saint-Germain-de-Grantham, Yamaska, Sorel-Tracy	
Drummond	Drummondville	173.7	107.9		173	A-55 south to I-91 – Drummondville, Sherbrooke, Vermont	West end of A-55 concurrency; A-55 exit 128
Drummond	Drummondville	174.2	108.2		175	R-143 north (Boulevard Lemire) – Saint-Bonaventure, Saint-François-du-Lac	West end of R-143 concurrency
Drummond	Drummondville	177.0	110.0		177	R-143 south – Saint-Majorique-de-Grantham, Drummondville	East end of R-143 concurrency
Drummond	Drummondville	179.3	111.4		179	Chemin du Golf	
Drummond	Drummondville	180.8	112.3		181	Drummondville	
Drummond	Saint-Cyrille-de-Wendover	185.6	115.3		185	R-255 – Baie-du-Febvre, Saint-Cyrille-de-Wendover, Saint-Félix-de-Kingsey	
Drummond	Notre-Dame-du-Bon-Conseil	191.6	119.1		191	Sainte-Brigitte-des-Saults	
Drummond	Notre-Dame-du-Bon-Conseil	196.5	122.1		196	R-259 – Nicolet, Sainte-Perpétue, Notre-Dame-du-Bon-Conseil, Quebec	
Drummond	Notre-Dame-du-Bon-Conseil	199.8	124.1		200	Saint-Léonard-d'Aston	Former R-155 north
Nicolet-Yamaska	Saint-Léonard-d'Aston	201.8	125.4		202	Rang du Moulin-Rouge	
Nicolet-Yamaska	Sainte-Eulalie	203.0	126.1		204	Rang des Cédres, Rang des Plaines	
Nicolet-Yamaska	Sainte-Eulalie	208.0– 211.0	129.2– 131.1		210	A-55 north – Bécancour, Trois-Rivières; A-955 south – Victoriaville, Saint-Albert, Warwick; R-161 – Sainte-Eulalie, Saint-Valère	East end of A-55 concurrency; A-55 exit 145; A-955 exit 15
Nicolet-Yamaska	Sainte-Eulalie	214.7	133.4		215	Rang des Épinettes	
Arthabaska	Daveluyville	220.3	136.9		220	R-261 – Bécancour, Daveluyville, Victoriaville	
Arthabaska	Daveluyville	223.0– 225.0	138.6– 139.8	Daveluyville Rest Stop (eastbound); Lac-à-la-Truite Rest Stop (westbound)			
Arthabaska	Saint-Louis-de-Blandford	228.7	142.1		228	R-165 (2^{e} Rang de Saint-Louis-de-Blandford) – Princeville, Plessisville, Thetford Mines	
Arthabaska	Saint-Louis-de-Blandford	235.0	146.0		235	R-162 south / R-263 north – Lemieux, Princeville, Victoriaville, Saint-Louis-de-Blandford	
Bécancour	Manseau	243.6	151.4		243	R-218 – Manseau, Saint-Pierre-les-Becquets	
L'Érable	Villeroy	252.6	157.0		253	R-265 – Villeroy, Plessisville, Deschaillons-sur-Saint-Laurent, Notre-Dame-de-Lourdes, Thetford Mines	
L'Érable	Villeroy	254.0	157.8	L'Érable Rest Stop (eastbound); Villeroy Rest Stop (westbound)			
L'Érable	Villeroy	256.4	159.3		256	15^{e} et 16^{e} Rangs de Villeroy	
Lotbinière	Val-Alain	261.7	162.6		261	Val-Alain	
Lotbinière	Val-Alain	266.5	165.6		266	4^{e} et 5^{e} Rangs de Val-Alain	
Lotbinière	Saint-Janvier-de-Joly	271.6	168.8		271	Saint-Janvier-de-Joly	
Lotbinière	Laurier-Station	278.1	172.8		278	R-271 – Laurier-Station, Sainte-Croix, Saint-Flavien	
Lotbinière	Notre-Dame-du-Sacré-Coeur-d'Issoudun-Saint-Apollinaire boundary	284.8	177.0		285	Notre-Dame-du-Sacré-Cœur-d'Issoudun	
Lotbinière	Saint-Apollinaire	290.7	180.6		291	R-273 – Saint-Agapit, Saint-Apollinaire, Saint-Antoine-de-Tilly	
Lotbinière	Saint-Apollinaire	296.3	184.1		296	Route du Cap	
Lévis		305.3	189.7		305	R-171 – Lévis, Thetford Mines	
Lévis		309.0	192.0	Chaudière-Appalaches Service Centre (eastbound)			
Lévis		311.4	193.5		311	R-116 – Lévis	
Lévis		312.8– 314.0	194.4– 195.1		312	A-73 to US 201 – Pont Pierre-Laporte, Québec, Saint-Georges, Maine	Signed as exits 312S (south) and 321N (north); westbound exit is part of 314; A-73 exit 131
Lévis		312.8– 314.0	194.4– 195.1		314	R-175 – Pont de Québec, Lévis	
Lévis		317.9	197.5		318	R-275 – Lévis	Eastbound signed as exits 318-S (south) and 318-N (north)
Lévis		321.5	199.8		321	Chemin des Îles	
Lévis		325.0	201.9		325	R-173 to R-277 – Lac-Etchemin, Lévis	Eastbound signed as exits 325-S (south) and 325-N (north)
Lévis		327.5	203.5		327	Route Monseigneur-Bourget	
Lévis		330.5	205.4		330	Route Lallemand	
Bellechasse	Beaumont	337.3	209.6		337	R-279 – Beaumont, Saint-Charles-de-Bellechasse, Saint-Damien-de-Buckland	
Bellechasse	Beaumont	341.0	211.9		341	Beaumont, Saint-Charles-de-Bellechasse	
Bellechasse	Saint-Michel-de-Bellechasse	344.0– 345.0	213.8– 214.4	La Durantaye Rest Stop (eastbound); Saint-Michel-de-Bellechasse Rest Stop (westbound)			
Bellechasse	Saint-Michel-de-Bellechasse	348.0	216.2		348	R-281 – Saint-Michel-de-Bellechasse, La Durantaye	
Bellechasse	Saint-Vallier	355.7	221.0		356	Saint-Vallier, Saint-Raphaël	
Montmagny	Berthier-sur-Mer	363.9	226.1		364	Berthier-sur-Mer, Saint-François-de-la-Rivière-du-Sud	
Montmagny	Saint-Pierre-de-la-Rivière-du-Sud	369.3	229.5		369	Saint-Pierre-de-la-Rivière-du-Sud	
Montmagny	Montmagny	375.9	233.6		376	R-228 (Chemin des Poirier) – Montmagny	
Montmagny	Montmagny	377.6	234.6		378	R-283 – Montmagny, Saint-Fabien-de-Panet	
Montmagny	Cap-Saint-Ignace	388.3	241.3		388	Cap-Saint-Ignace	
L'Islet	L'Islet	393.0	244.2	Belles-Amours Rest Stop (westbound, seasonal)			
L'Islet	L'Islet	399.9	248.5		400	R-285 – L'Islet	
L'Islet	Saint-Jean-Port-Joli	413.5	256.9		414	R-204 – Saint-Jean-Port-Joli, Saint-Aubert, Saint-Pamphile	
L'Islet	Saint-Roch-des-Aulnaies	430.0	267.2		430	R-132 – Saint-Roch-des-Aulnaies, Sainte-Louise	
Kamouraska	La Pocatière	435.8	270.8		436	R-132 (Avenue Industrielle) – La Pocatière	
Kamouraska	La Pocatière	438.9	272.7		439	La Pocatière	
Kamouraska	La Pocatière	443.8	275.8		444	R-132 (Avenue de la Grande-Anse) – La Pocatière, Rivière-Ouelle	
Kamouraska	Rivière-Ouelle–Saint-Pacôme boundary	449.3	279.2		450	Rivière-Ouelle, Saint-Pacôme, Saint-Gabriel-Lalemant	
Kamouraska	Saint-Philippe-de-Néri	455.7	283.2		456	R-287 – Saint-Denis-De La Bouteillerie, Saint-Philippe-de-Néri, Mont-Carmel	
Kamouraska	Saint-Philippe-de-Néri	458.0	284.6	Kamouraska Rest Stop (westbound); Monadnocks Rest Stop (eastbound)			
Kamouraska	Saint-Pascal	464.4	288.6		465	Kamouraska, Saint-Pascal, Saint-Bruno-de-Kamouraska	
Kamouraska	Sainte-Hélène-de-Kamouraska	473.9	294.5		474	Saint-Germain-de-Kamouraska, Sainte-Hélène-de-Kamouraska	
Kamouraska	Saint-André-de-Kamouraska	479.9	298.2		480	Saint-André-de-Kamouraska, Saint-Joseph-de-Kamouraska	
Kamouraska	Saint-Alexandre-de-Kamouraska	487.5	302.9		488	R-289 to R-230 – Saint-Alexandre-de-Kamouraska, Pohénégamook, Lac-Baker, NB	
Rivière-du-Loup	Notre-Dame-du-Portage	495.1	307.6		496	Notre-Dame-du-Portage	
Rivière-du-Loup	Notre-Dame-du-Portage	498.0	309.4	Portage Rest Stop (eastbound, seasonal)			
Rivière-du-Loup	Notre-Dame-du-Portage	499.3	310.3		499	A-85 (TCH) south to Route 2 – Témiscouata-sur-le-Lac, Dégelis, New Brunswick	Trans-Canada Highway east end (continues on A-85 south); eastbound exit and westbound entrance; A-85 exit 100
Rivière-du-Loup	Rivière-du-Loup	502.3	312.1		503	R-132 (Rue Fraser) / Boulevard de l'Hôtel-de-Ville	
Rivière-du-Loup	Rivière-du-Loup	506.6	314.8		507	R-132 (Boulevard Cartier) – Saint-Siméon	
Rivière-du-Loup	Cacouna	513.9	319.3		514	R-191 to A-85 – Saint-Arsène, Cacouna, Témiscouata-sur-le-Lac, New Brunswick	Westbound access to A-85; highway transitions to a super two with passing lanes after this exit
Rivière-du-Loup	Cacouna	520.5	323.4		521	Route Moreault	
Rivière-du-Loup	L'Isle-Verte	527.1	327.5		527	Montée des Coteaux	
Rivière-du-Loup	L'Isle-Verte	531.4	330.2		531	L'Isle-Verte (Rue Notre-Dame), St-Paul-de-la-Croix	
Rivière-du-Loup	L'Isle-Verte	539.1	335.0		539	Saint-Éloi, Route de la Station	
Les Basques	Notre-Dame-des-Neiges	542.5	337.1		542	To R-132 / Route Drapeau – Trois-Pistoles, Rimouski	Current eastern end of main segment
55-kilometre (35 mi) gap in A-20
Rimouski-Neigette	Rimouski	0.0	0.0		597	R-132 – Rivière-du-Loup, Rimouski	At-grade intersection
Rimouski-Neigette	Rimouski	9.0	5.6		606	Rue de Lausanne	
Rimouski-Neigette	Rimouski	13.4	8.3		610	R-232 (Chemin Sainte-Odile) – Rimouski	
Rimouski-Neigette	Rimouski	17.4	10.8		614	Montée Industrielle-et-Commercialle	
Rimouski-Neigette	Rimouski-Saint-Anaclet-de-Lessard boundary	24.5	15.2		621	Avenue Père-Nouvel / Rue de la Gare	
La Mitis	Sainte-Luce	32.1	19.9		629	R-298 – Sainte-Luce, Saint-Donat, Sainte-Flavie6	
La Mitis	Mont-Joli	45.2	28.1		641	R-132 / Boulevard Jacques-Cartier – Sainte-Flavie, Matane, Amqui, New Brunswick	Eastern terminus; traffic circle
1.000 mi = 1.609 km; 1.000 km = 0.621 mi: Concurrency terminus; Incomplete access; Route transition

== Rest stops ==
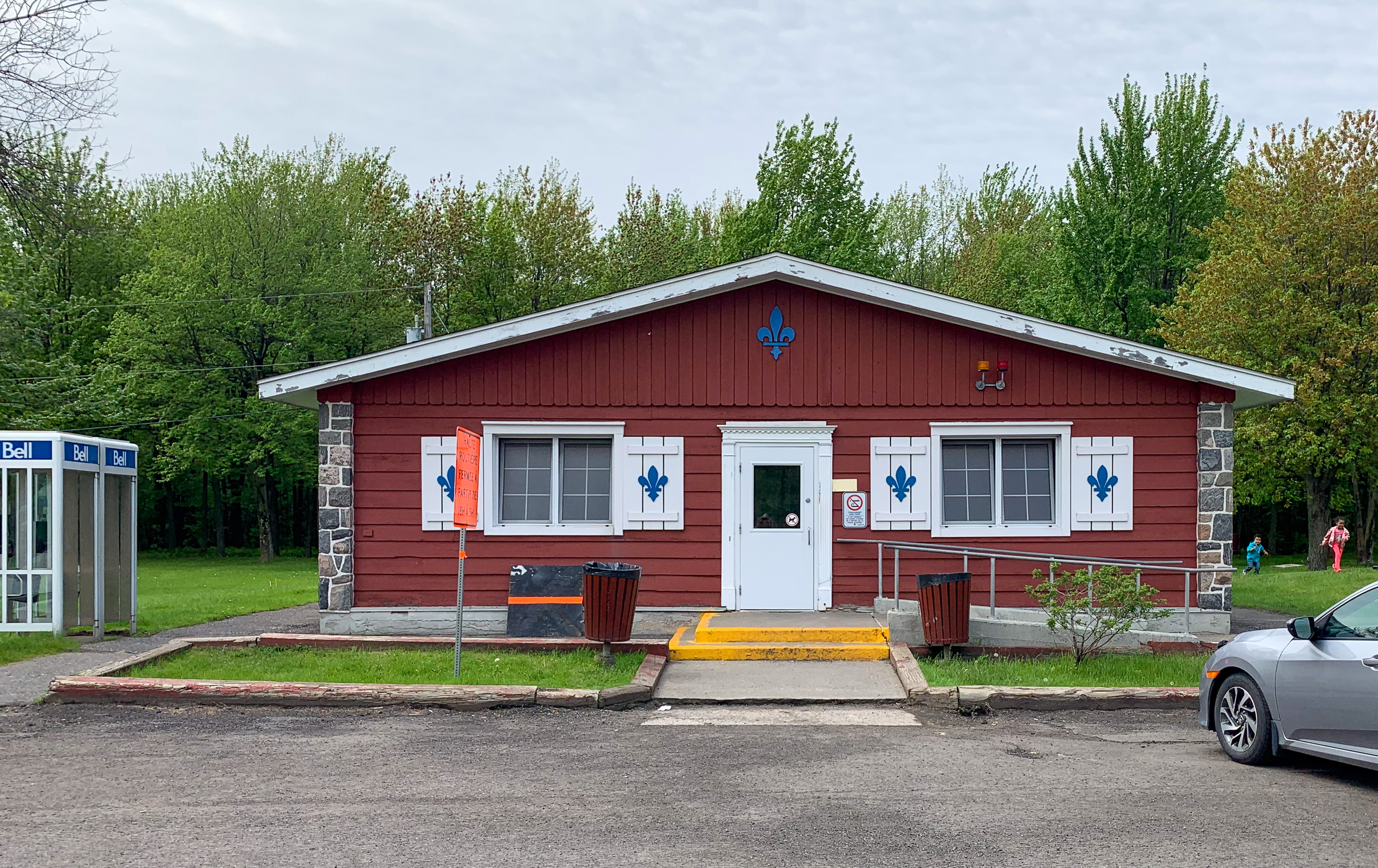
Hurons Rest Stop (westbound) at Sainte-Marie-Madeleine

Other than the Rivière-Beaudette Rest Area, the remaining rest areas along A-20 are not full service and simple places for motorists and truckers to rest. All (except one) have washrooms and a payphone, A few are seasonal only.

There are 15 rest stops located at the following points along Autoroute 20, and contain the following services:

Location	Name	km	Direction	Services
Rivière-Beaudette	Rivière-Beaudette	2	Eastbound	Full Service Centre, open 24 hours: Washrooms; tourist information; payphone; electric vehicle charging stations C-store (Couche-Tard); Fuel (Esso); Food (St-Hubert, Tim Hortons)
Sainte-Marie-Madeleine	Sainte-Madeleine	117	Eastbound	Washrooms; payphone
Sainte-Marie-Madeleine	Hurons	117	Westbound	Washrooms; payphone
Saint-Eugène	Saint-Nazaire-d'Acton	156	Westbound	Washrooms; payphone
Daveluyville	Daveluyville	223	Eastbound	Washrooms; payphone,
Daveluyville	Lac-à-la-Truite	225	Westbound	Washrooms; payphone
Villeroy	L'Érable	254	Eastbound	Truck pull-off only. Former full rest area with facilities removed.
Villeroy	Villeroy	254	Westbound	Washrooms; payphone
Lévis	Chaudière-Appalaches (Formerly Saint-Rédempteur)	309	Eastbound	Washrooms; tourist information; vending machines; payphone; indoor seating with tables; electric vehicle charging stations. Rest area building open 24 hours.
Saint-Michel-de-Bellechasse	La Durantaye	344	Eastbound	Washrooms; vending machines
Saint-Michel-de-Bellechasse	Saint-Michel-de-Bellechasse	345	Westbound	Washrooms; tourist information; vending machines; payphone; indoor seating with tables and microwave oven. Rest area building open 24 hours.
L'Islet	Belles-Amours	393	Westbound	Seasonal (open only June to August): Washrooms; vending machines; payphone
Saint-Philippe-de-Néri	Kamouraska	458	Eastbound	Washrooms; vending machines; payphone
Saint-Philippe-de-Néri	Monadnocks	458	Westbound	Washrooms; vending machines; payphone
Notre-Dame-du-Portage	Portage	498	Eastbound	Seasonal (open only June to August): Washrooms; tourist information; payphone

== Gallery ==
A-20 eastbound

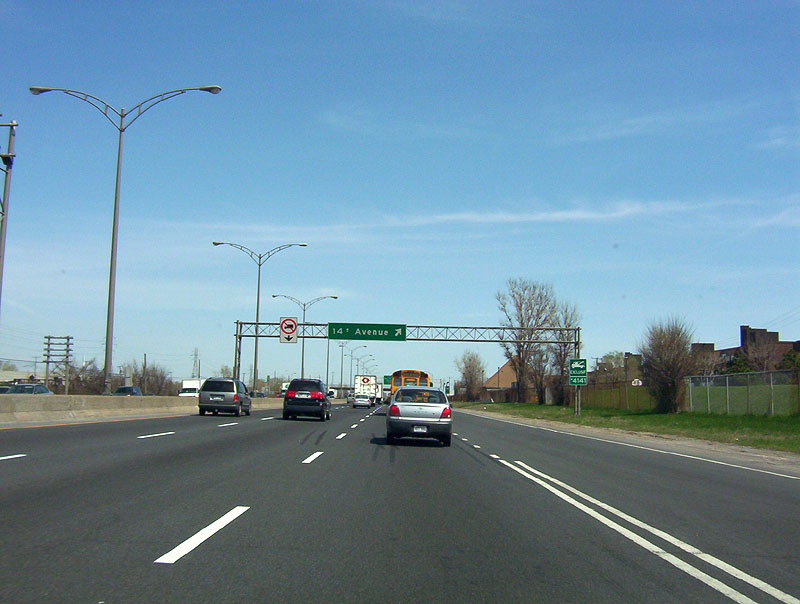
former 14th Ave. exit, Montréal, 2005

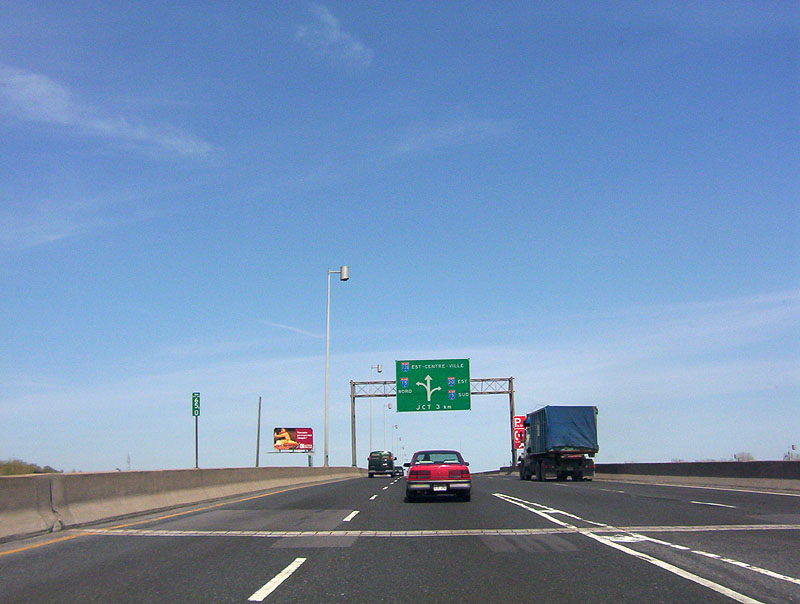
Merge with 138, Montréal, 2005

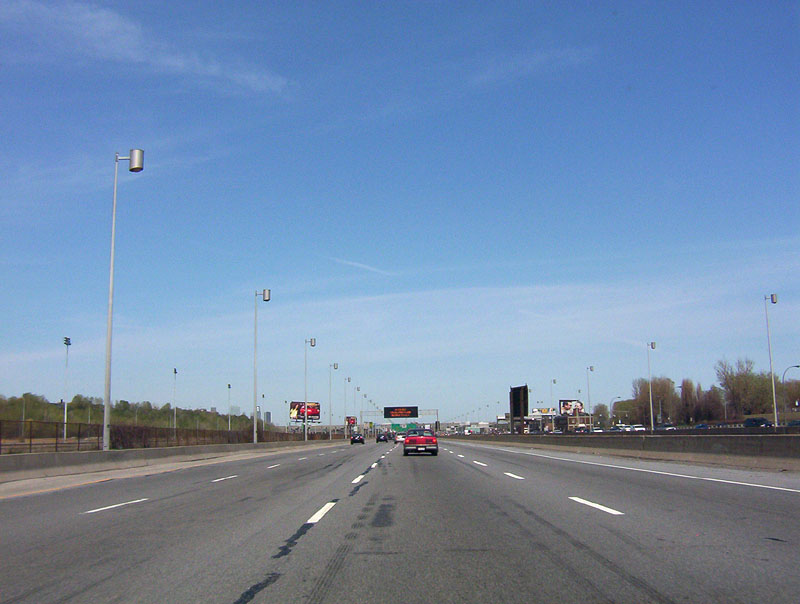
Turcot yards, 2005

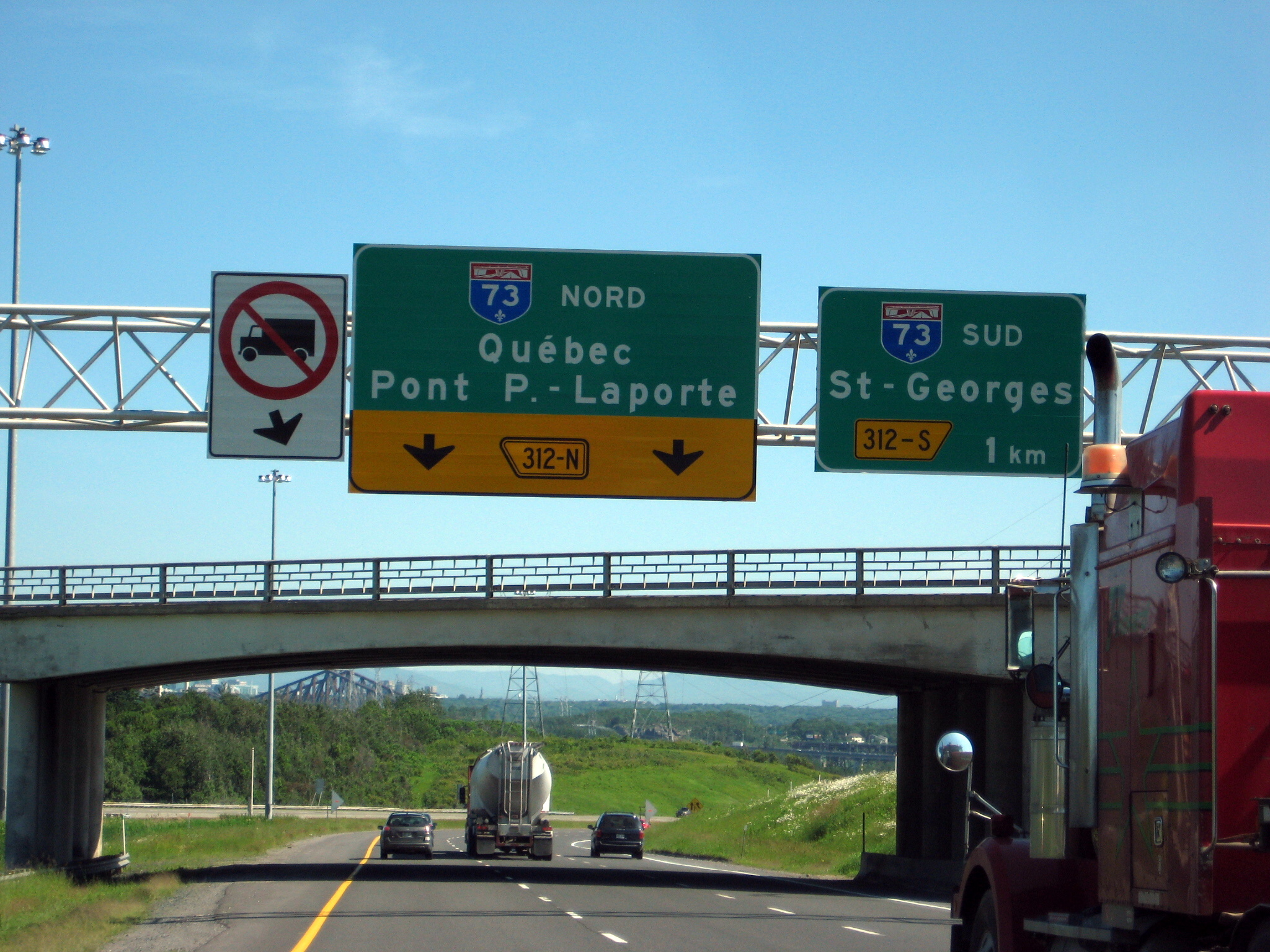
Autoroute 20 eastbound, km 311 near Pierre-Laporte Bridges in Lévis, Québec

A-20 westbound

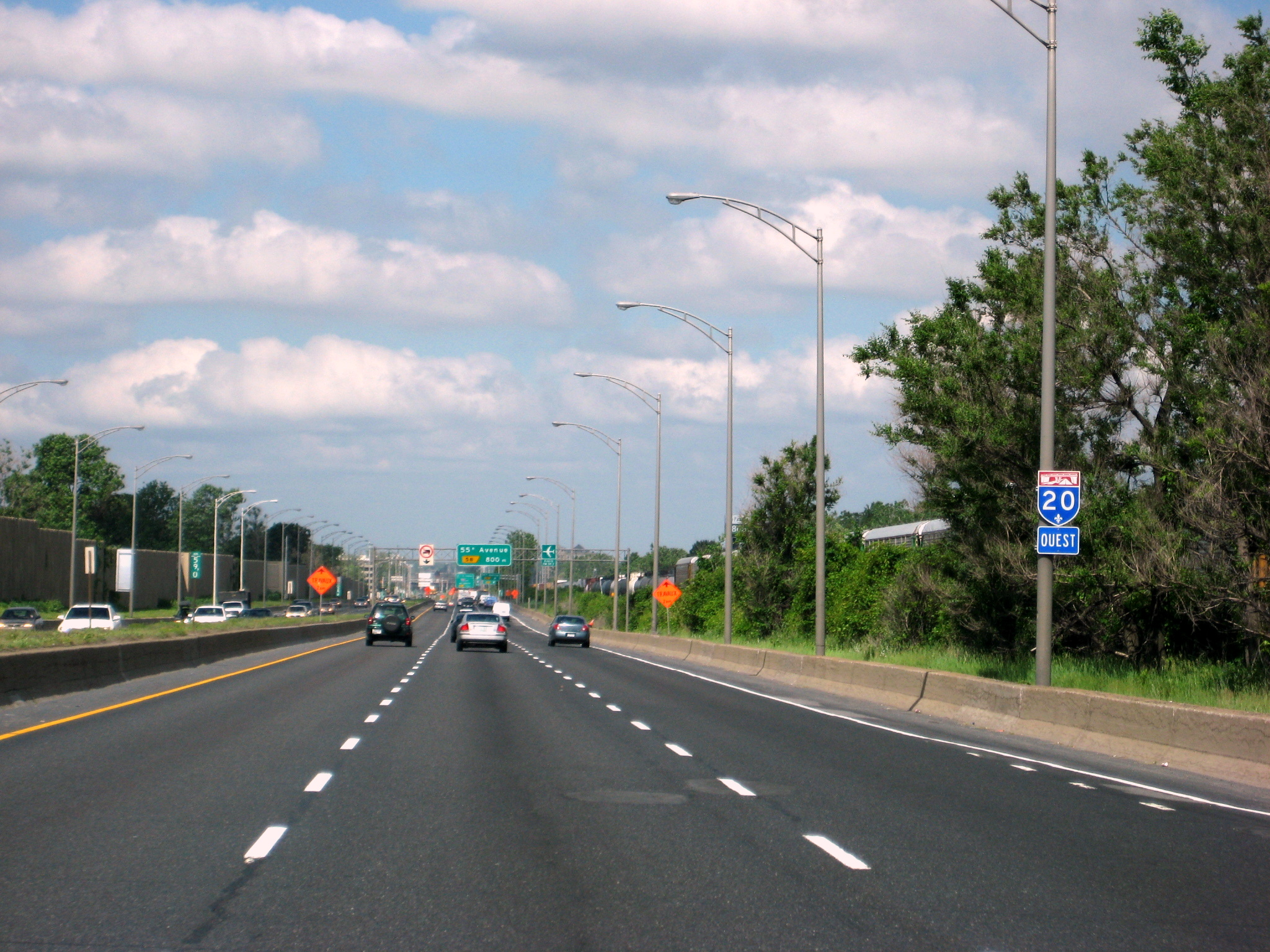
Autoroute 20 west, ~km59 on Montreal Island

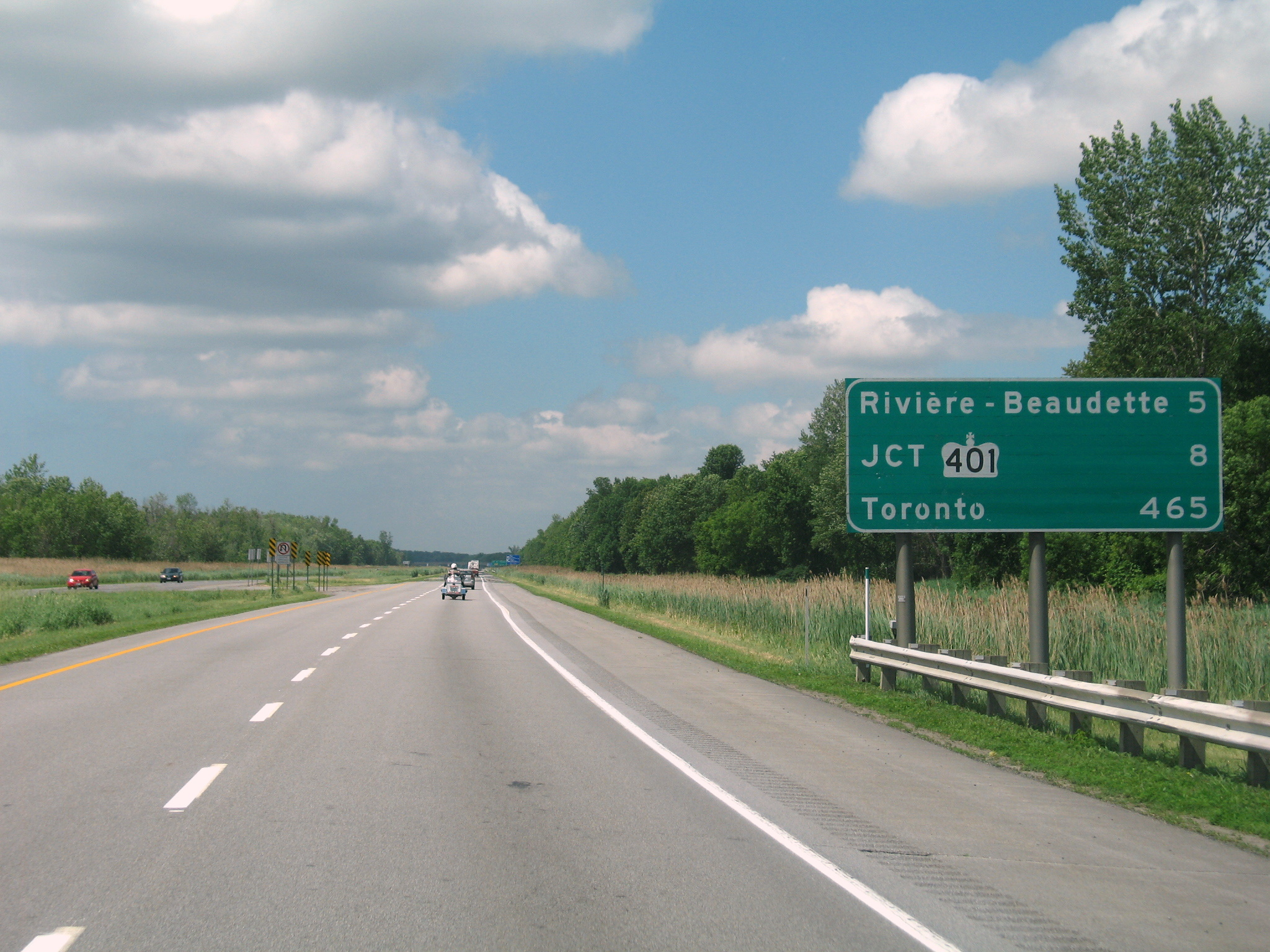
Autoroute 20 east, near Rivière Beaudette, ~km 5

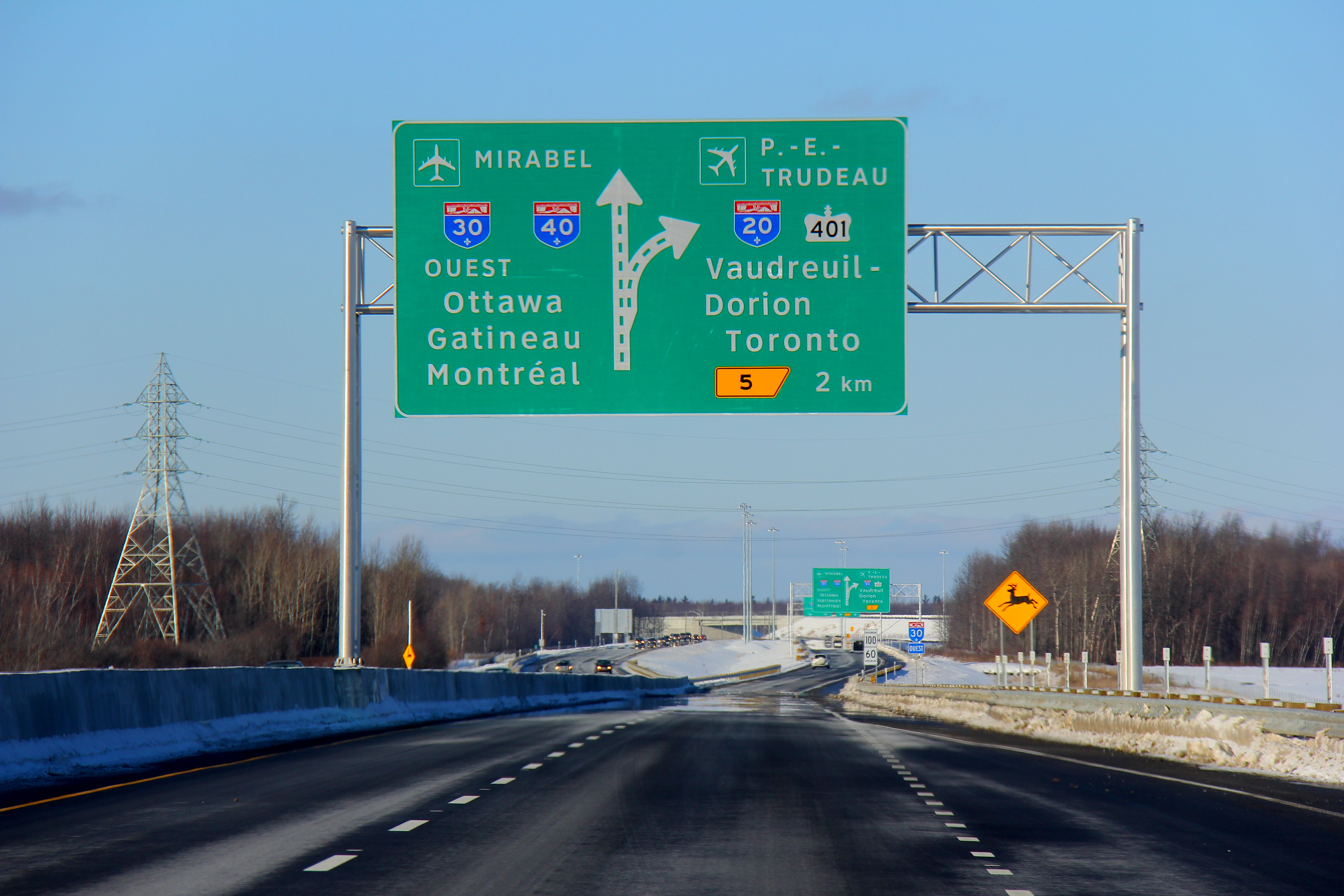
A-30 at A-20 westbound

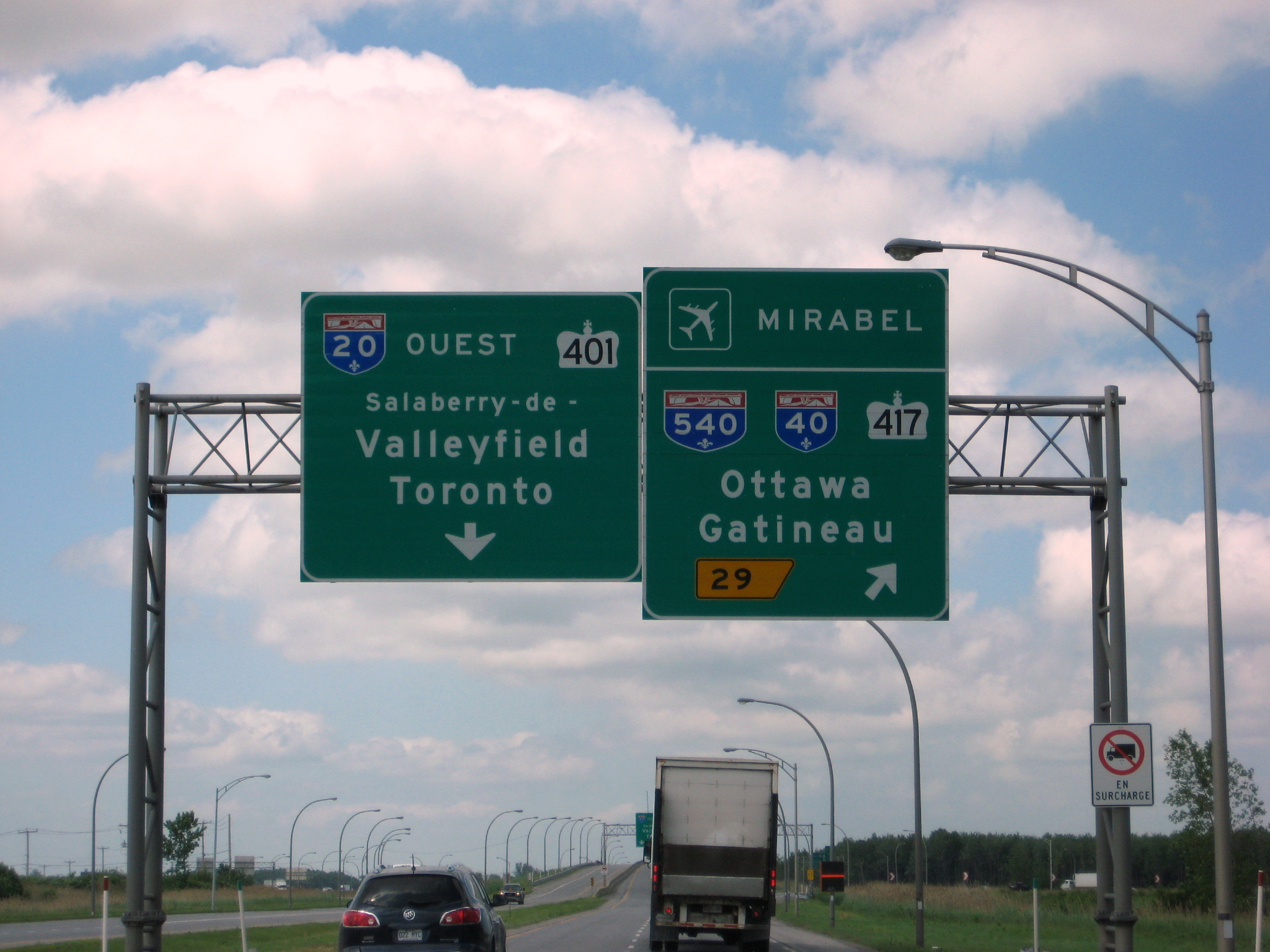
Autoroute 20 west, exit 29.

== See also ==
- List of bridges in Montreal
- List of crossings of the Ottawa River
- List of crossings of the Saint Lawrence River

== Notes ==
Trans-Canada Highway
Previous route Autoroute 25	Autoroute 20	Next route Autoroute 85
