= Saint-Philippe-de-Néri =

- Parish municipality
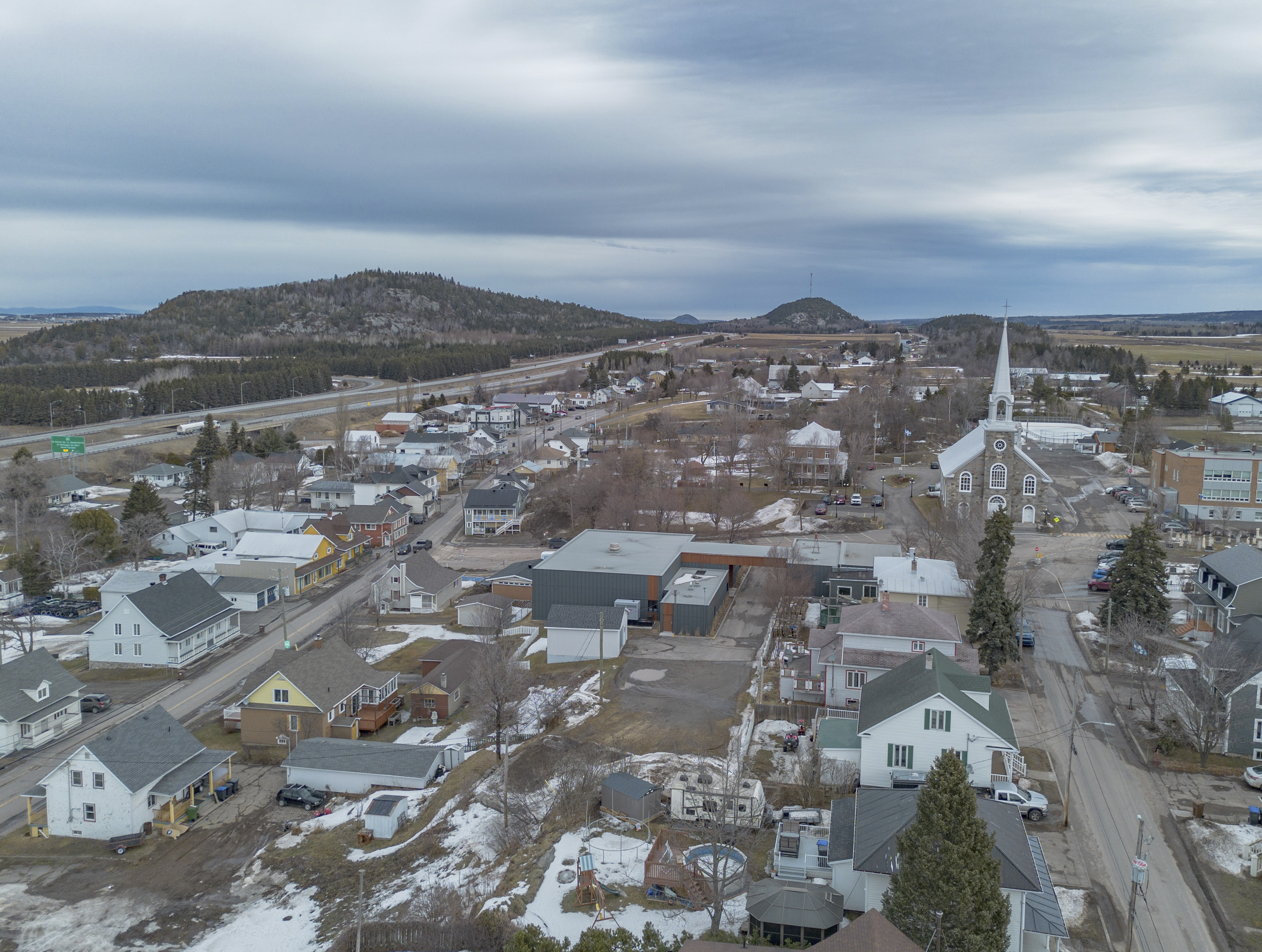
- Saint-Philippe-de-Néri in 2026

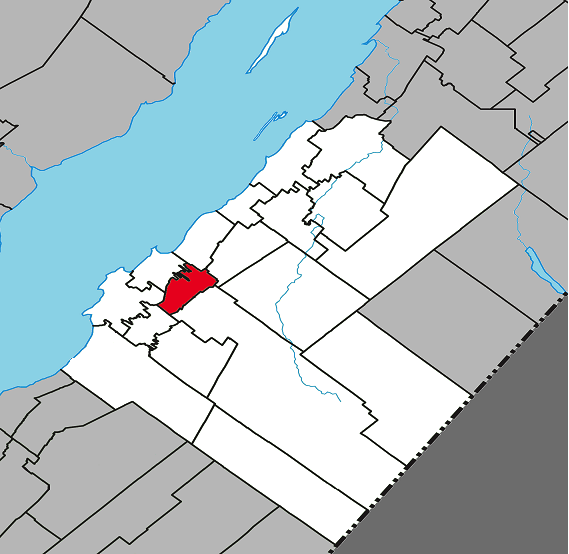
- Location within Kamouraska RCM

- Location in eastern Quebec
- Coordinates: 47°28′N 69°53′W
- Country: Canada
- Province: Quebec
- Region: Bas-Saint-Laurent
- RCM: Kamouraska
- Constituted: December 29, 1875

Government
  - Mayor: Frédéric Lizotte
  - Federal riding: Côte-du-Sud—Rivière-du-Loup—Kataskomiq—Témiscouata
  - Prov. riding: Côte-du-Sud

Area
  - Total: 32.60 km^{2} (12.59 sq mi)
  - Land: 32.65 km^{2} (12.61 sq mi)
- There is an apparent contradiction between two authoritative sources

Population (2021)
  - Total: 818
  - Density: 25.1/km^{2} (65/sq mi)
  - Pop 2016-2021: ▼1.7%
  - Dwellings: 385
- Time zone: UTC−5 (EST)
  - Summer (DST): UTC−4 (EDT)
- Postal code(s): G0L 4A0
- Area codes: 418 and 581
- Highways A-20 (TCH): R-230; R-287
- Website: www.stphilippedeneri.com

Saint-Philippe-de-Néri (French pronunciation: [sɛ̃ filip də neʁi]) is a parish municipality in the Canadian province of Quebec, located in the Kamouraska Regional County Municipality.

== Geography ==
From its source in the south-east of the municipality, the Dufour River flows north-eastwards.

== Demographics ==
In the 2021 Census of Population conducted by Statistics Canada, Saint-Philippe-de-Néri had a population of 818 living in 370 of its 385 total private dwellings, a change of −1.7% from its 2016 population of 832. With a land area of 32.65 km^{2} (12.61 sq mi), it had a population density of 25.1/km^{2} (64.9/sq mi) in 2021.

=== Population ===
Population trend:

Census	Population	Change
2021	818	▼1.7%
2016	832	▼4.1%
2011	868	▼2.4%
2006	889	▼6.7%
2001	953	▼1.4%
1996	967	▲0.7%
1991	960	▼8.7%
1986	1,052	▲6.8%
1981	985	▼1.1%
1976	996	▼1.3%
1971	1,009	▼9.9%
1966	1,120	▼2.0%
1961	1,143	▲2.1%
1956	1,119	▲1.7%
1951	1,100	▼0.6%
1941	1,107	▲14.6%
1931	966	▲9.9%
1921	879	▼9.3%
1911	969	▲0.3%
1901	966	▼7.9%
1891	1,049	▼1.5%
1881	1,034	N/A

=== Language ===
Mother tongue (2021)

Language	Population	Pct (%)
French only	800	99.4%
English only	5	0.6%
English and French	5	0.6%
Non-official languages	0	0.0%

== Government ==
=== Municipal council ===
- Mayor: Frédéric Lizotte
- Councillors: Kristina Bouchard, Alain Castonguay, Jean-Charles Jean, Roland Lévesque, Marco Lizotte, Jean-Marie Michaud

== See also ==
- List of parish municipalities in Quebec
