= Manseau =

- Municipality
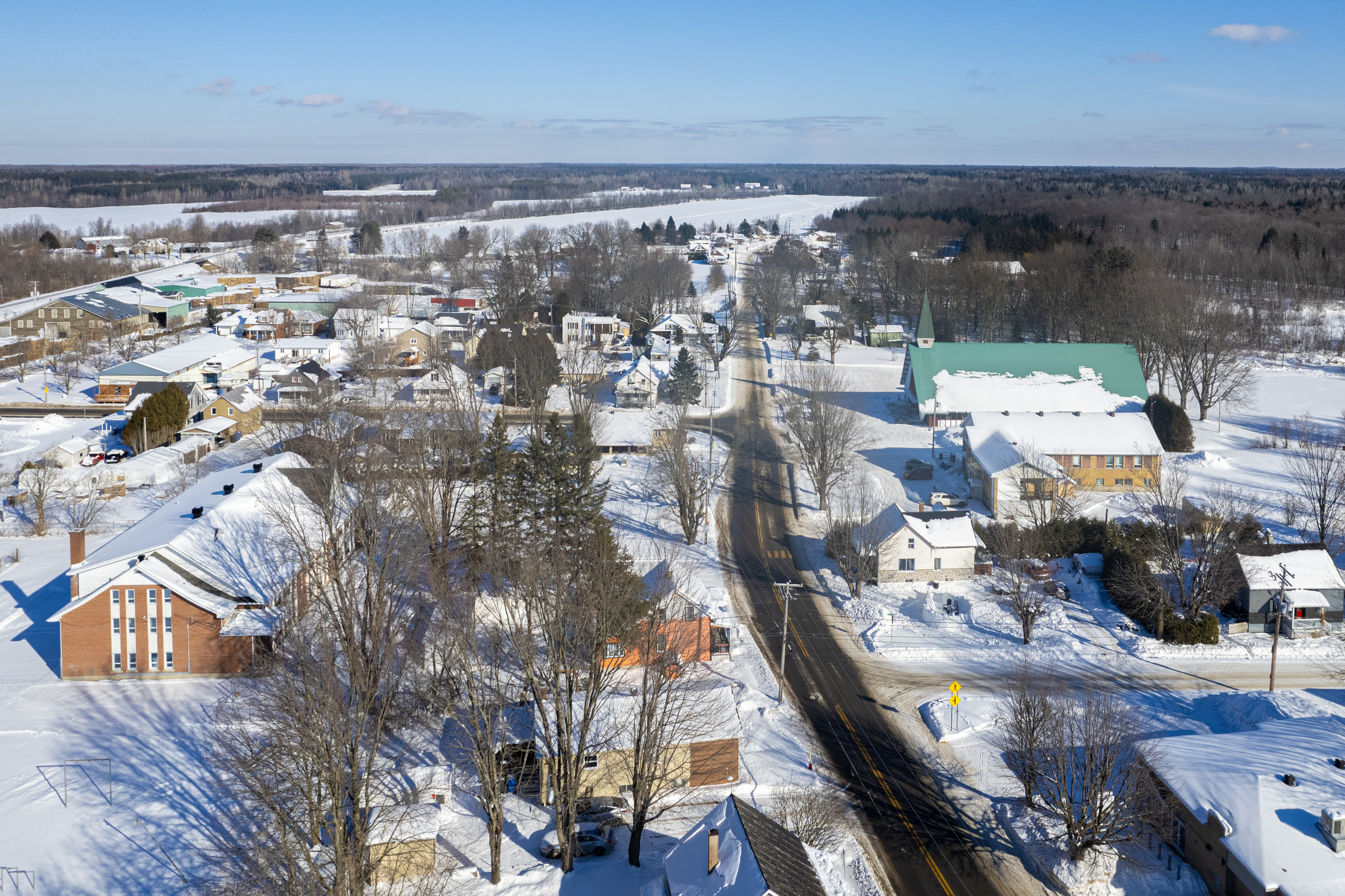
- Aerial view of Manseau

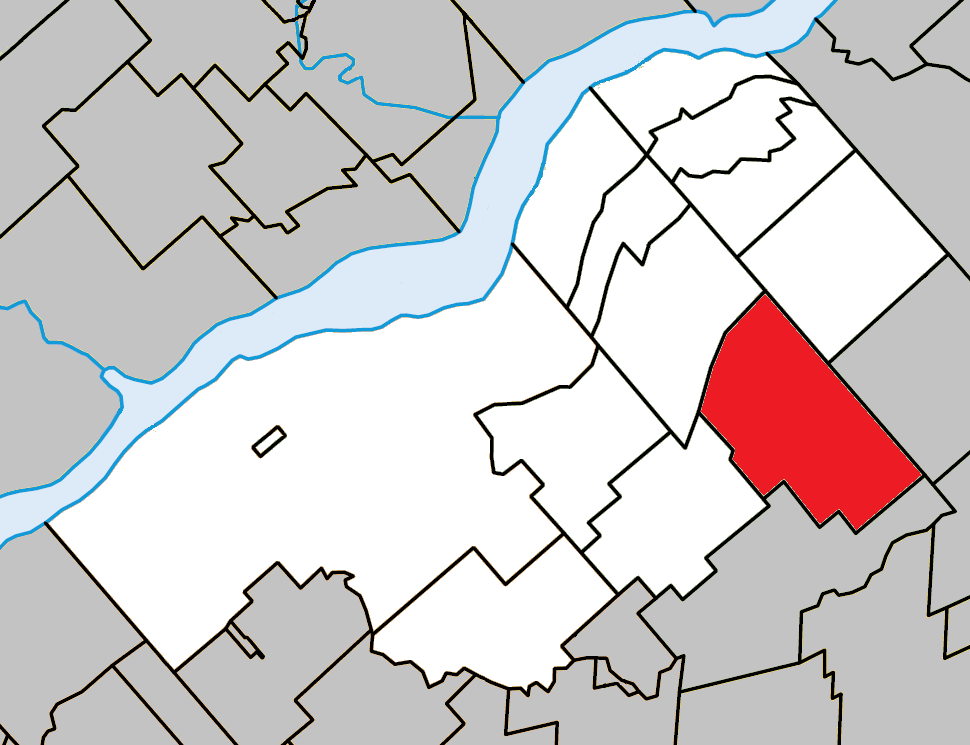
- Location within Bécancour RCM.

- Location in southern Quebec.
- Coordinates: 46°22′N 72°00′W
- Country: Canada
- Province: Quebec
- Region: Centre-du-Québec
- RCM: Bécancour
- Constituted: December 31, 1997

Government
  - Mayor: Guy St-Pierre
  - Federal riding: Bécancour—Nicolet—Saurel—Alnôbak
  - Prov. riding: Nicolet-Bécancour

Area
  - Total: 107.30 km^{2} (41.43 sq mi)
  - Land: 104.48 km^{2} (40.34 sq mi)

Population (2021)
  - Total: 807
  - Density: 7.7/km^{2} (20/sq mi)
  - Pop 2016-2021: ▼1.1%
  - Dwellings: 422
- Time zone: UTC−5 (EST)
  - Summer (DST): UTC−4 (EDT)
- Postal code(s): G0X 1V0
- Area code: 819
- Highways A-20 (TCH): R-218
- Website: municipalites-du-quebec.ca/manseau

Manseau (French pronunciation: [mɑ̃so]) is a municipality in the Centre-du-Québec region of the province of Quebec in Canada.

== See also ==
- List of municipalities in Quebec
