= Saint-Denis-De La Bouteillerie =

- Municipality
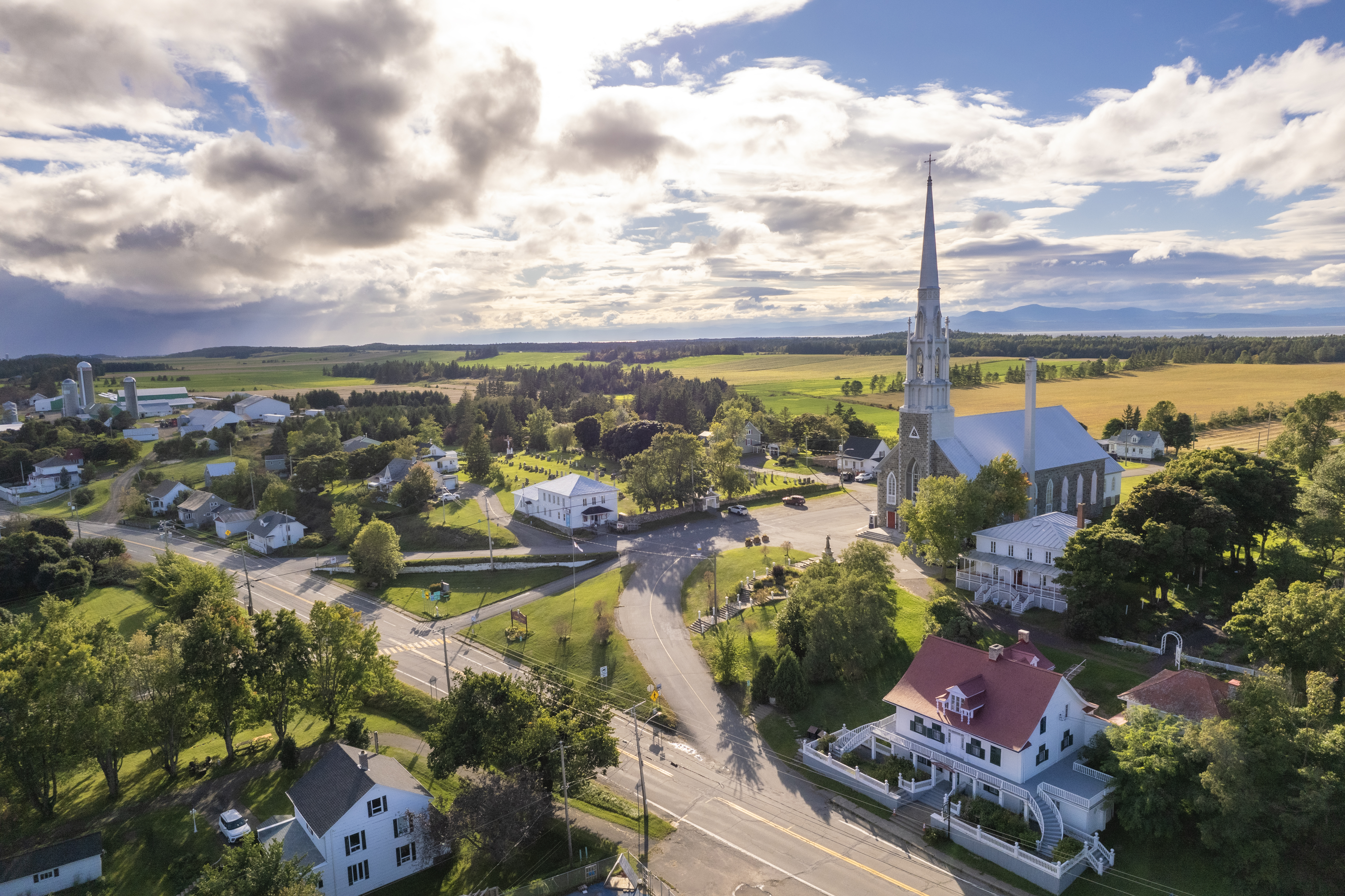

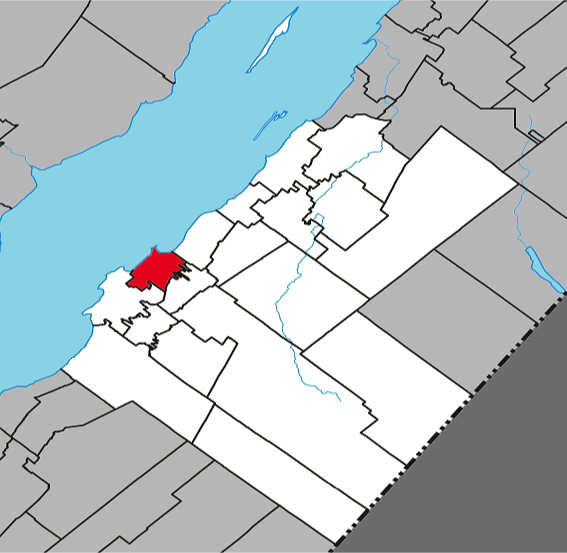
- Location within Kamouraska RCM

- Location in eastern Quebec
- Coordinates: 47°30′N 69°56′W
- Country: Canada
- Province: Quebec
- Region: Bas-Saint-Laurent
- RCM: Kamouraska
- Constituted: July 1, 1855

Government
  - Mayor: Frédéric Landry
  - Federal riding: Côte-du-Sud—Rivière-du-Loup—Kataskomiq—Témiscouata
  - Prov. riding: Côte-du-Sud

Area
  - Total: 97.30 km^{2} (37.57 sq mi)
  - Land: 33.84 km^{2} (13.07 sq mi)

Population (2021)
  - Total: 518
  - Density: 15.3/km^{2} (40/sq mi)
  - Pop 2016-2021: ▲0.2%
  - Dwellings: 367
- Time zone: UTC−5 (EST)
  - Summer (DST): UTC−4 (EDT)
- Postal code(s): G0L 2R0
- Area codes: 418 and 581
- Highways: R-132; R-287
- Website: www.munstdenis.com

Saint-Denis-De La Bouteillerie (French pronunciation: [sɛ̃ dəni də la butɛjʁi]) is a municipality in the Canadian province of Quebec, located in the Kamouraska Regional County Municipality.

Prior to November 16, 2013, it was known simply as Saint-Denis and was a parish municipality. The name change was a revival of an old name used from 1845 to 1855. When the name was officially changed, it was also retroactively declared that the name should have been known as Saint-Denis de Kamouraska since 1855.

It contains the house of Jean-Charles Chapais, a National Historic Site of Canada.

== History ==
This territory was known as Saint-Denis-De La Bouteillerie for a long time, but when the municipality was officially created, in 1855, it took the name of Saint-Denis-de-Kamouraska. During the mid 20th century, the name was quietly shortened to simply Saint-Denis. The name Saint-Denis stayed until 2013 when the status of the municipality changed from a parish municipality to a regular municipality. At the same time, the name of Saint-Denis was changed to the current Saint-Denis-De La Bouteillerie.

== Geography ==
=== Climate ===
Climate data for Saint-Denis-De La Bouteillerie, Quebec, 1991-2020 Normals (Extremes 1900-2020)
Month	Jan	Feb	Mar	Apr	May	Jun	Jul	Aug	Sep	Oct	Nov	Dec	Year
Record high °C (°F)	14.5 (58.1)	12.5 (54.5)	21.8 (71.2)	28.5 (83.3)	33.7 (92.7)	35.0 (95.0)	35.0 (95.0)	35.7 (96.3)	32.8 (91.0)	27.2 (81.0)	21.1 (70.0)	16.2 (61.2)	35.7 (96.3)
Mean daily maximum °C (°F)	−6.5 (20.3)	−5.0 (23.0)	0.1 (32.2)	7.6 (45.7)	16.2 (61.2)	21.6 (70.9)	24.2 (75.6)	23.6 (74.5)	18.9 (66.0)	11.1 (52.0)	4.3 (39.7)	−2.6 (27.3)	9.5 (49.1)
Daily mean °C (°F)	−10.9 (12.4)	−9.6 (14.7)	−4.4 (24.1)	3.0 (37.4)	10.4 (50.7)	15.8 (60.4)	18.7 (65.7)	18.0 (64.4)	13.6 (56.5)	7.0 (44.6)	0.8 (33.4)	−6.4 (20.5)	4.7 (40.5)
Mean daily minimum °C (°F)	−15.3 (4.5)	−14.3 (6.3)	−8.8 (16.2)	−1.5 (29.3)	4.7 (40.5)	10.0 (50.0)	13.2 (55.8)	12.4 (54.3)	8.3 (46.9)	2.7 (36.9)	−2.7 (27.1)	−10.1 (13.8)	−0.1 (31.8)
Record low °C (°F)	−35.6 (−32.1)	−36.7 (−34.1)	−28.5 (−19.3)	−18.5 (−1.3)	−7.0 (19.4)	−5.6 (21.9)	−1.1 (30.0)	1.1 (34.0)	−4.4 (24.1)	−12.2 (10.0)	−23.3 (−9.9)	−32.8 (−27.0)	−36.7 (−34.1)
Average precipitation mm (inches)	70.4 (2.77)	60.7 (2.39)	61.8 (2.43)	68.9 (2.71)	74.0 (2.91)	84.7 (3.33)	80.8 (3.18)	81.9 (3.22)	78.0 (3.07)	98.7 (3.89)	71.8 (2.83)	74.3 (2.93)	905.9 (35.67)
Average extreme snow depth cm (inches)	65 (26)	90 (35)	90 (35)	60 (24)	2 (0.8)	0 (0)	0 (0)	0 (0)	0 (0)	4 (1.6)	19 (7.5)	47 (19)	90 (35)
Source: Environment Canada

== Demographics ==
=== Population ===
Population trend:

Census	Population	Change (%)
2021	518	▲0.2%
2016	517	▲2.8%
2011	503	▼3.8%
2006	523	▲10.3%
2001	474	▼2.9%
1996	488	▲10.4%
1991	442	▼11.6%
1986	500	▼6.0%
1981	532	▼5.5%
1976	563	▼8.8%
1971	617	▼4.3%
1966	645	▼12.5%
1961	737	▼7.4%
1956	796	▲0.3%
1951	768	▲10.5%
1941	695	▲0.6%
1931	691	▼12.9%
1921	793	▼3.6%
1911	823	▲2.1%
1901	806	▼11.3%
1891	909	▼4.3%
1881	950	▼3.1%
1871	980	▼45.0%
1861	1,782	N/A

== Government ==
- Mayor: Frédéric Landry
- Councillors: Nathalie Caron, Jean Dubé, Normand Dumais, Gabriel Langlois, Guy Roy, Sylvain St-Denis

== See also ==
- List of municipalities in Quebec
