= Quebec Route 287 =

Highway in Quebec, Canada

Route 287

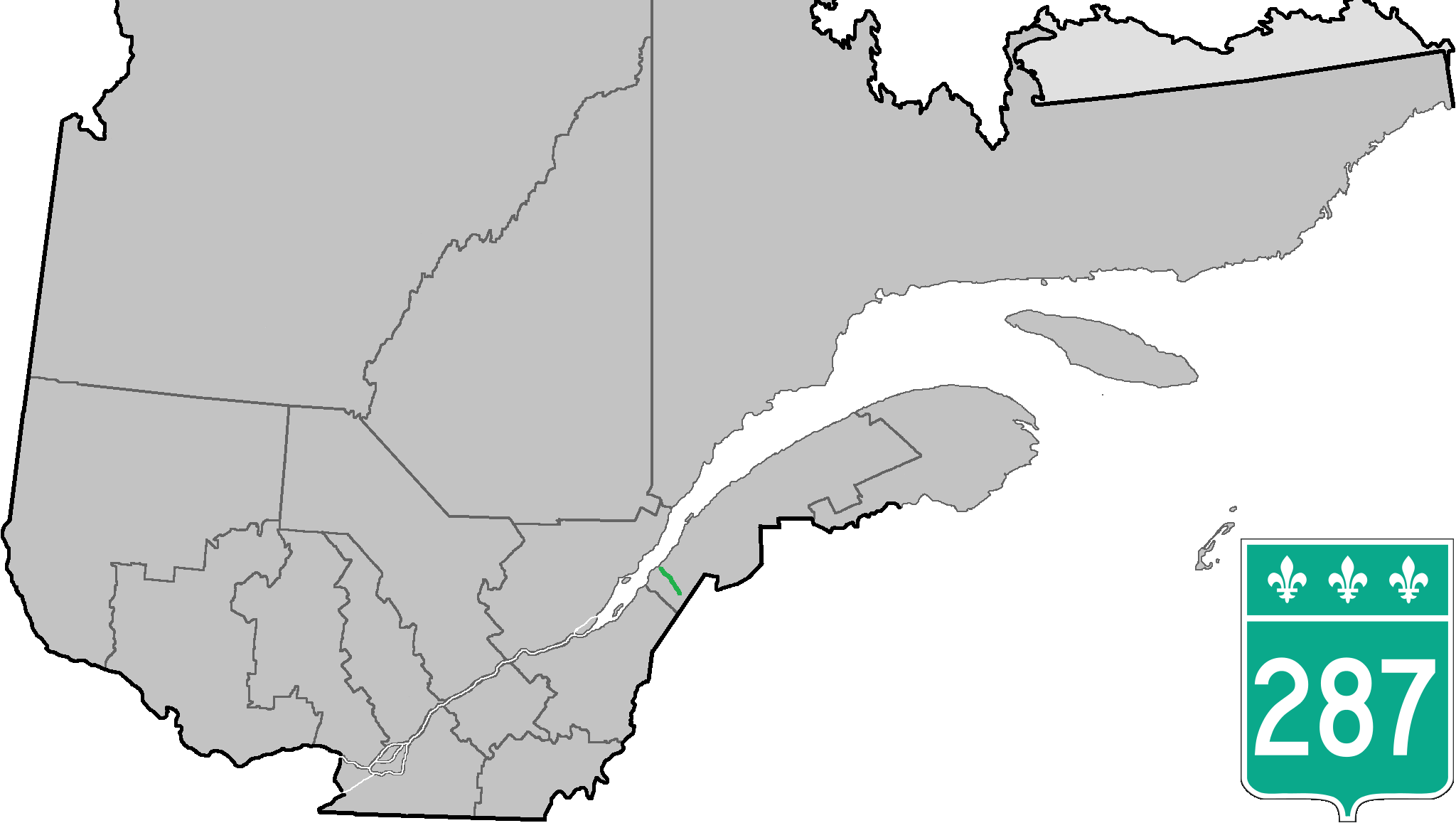

Route information
- Length: 42 km (26 mi)

Major junctions
- South end: Rue des Trembles / Rue des Epinettes south of Mont-Carmel
- A-20 (TCH) / R-230 in Saint-Philippe-de-Neri
- North end: R-132 in Saint-Denis-De La Bouteillerie

Location
- Country: Canada
- Province: Quebec
- Major cities: Saint-Philippe-de-Neri

Highway system
- Quebec provincial highways; Autoroutes; List; Former
← R-285	→ R-289

Route 287 is a 42 km two-lane north/south highway on the south shore of the Saint Lawrence River in the Bas-Saint-Laurent region of Eastern Quebec, Canada. Its northern terminus is in Saint-Denis-De La Bouteillerie at the junction of Route 132 and the southern terminus is at Lac de l'Est, part of the municipality of Mont-Carmel. About 10 km after Mont-Carmel, the route becomes a gravel road until the lake.

== List of towns along Route 287 ==
- Saint-Denis-De La Bouteillerie
- Saint-Philippe-de-Neri
- Mont-Carmel

== See also ==
- List of Quebec provincial highways
