= Saint-Bruno-de-Kamouraska =

- Municipality
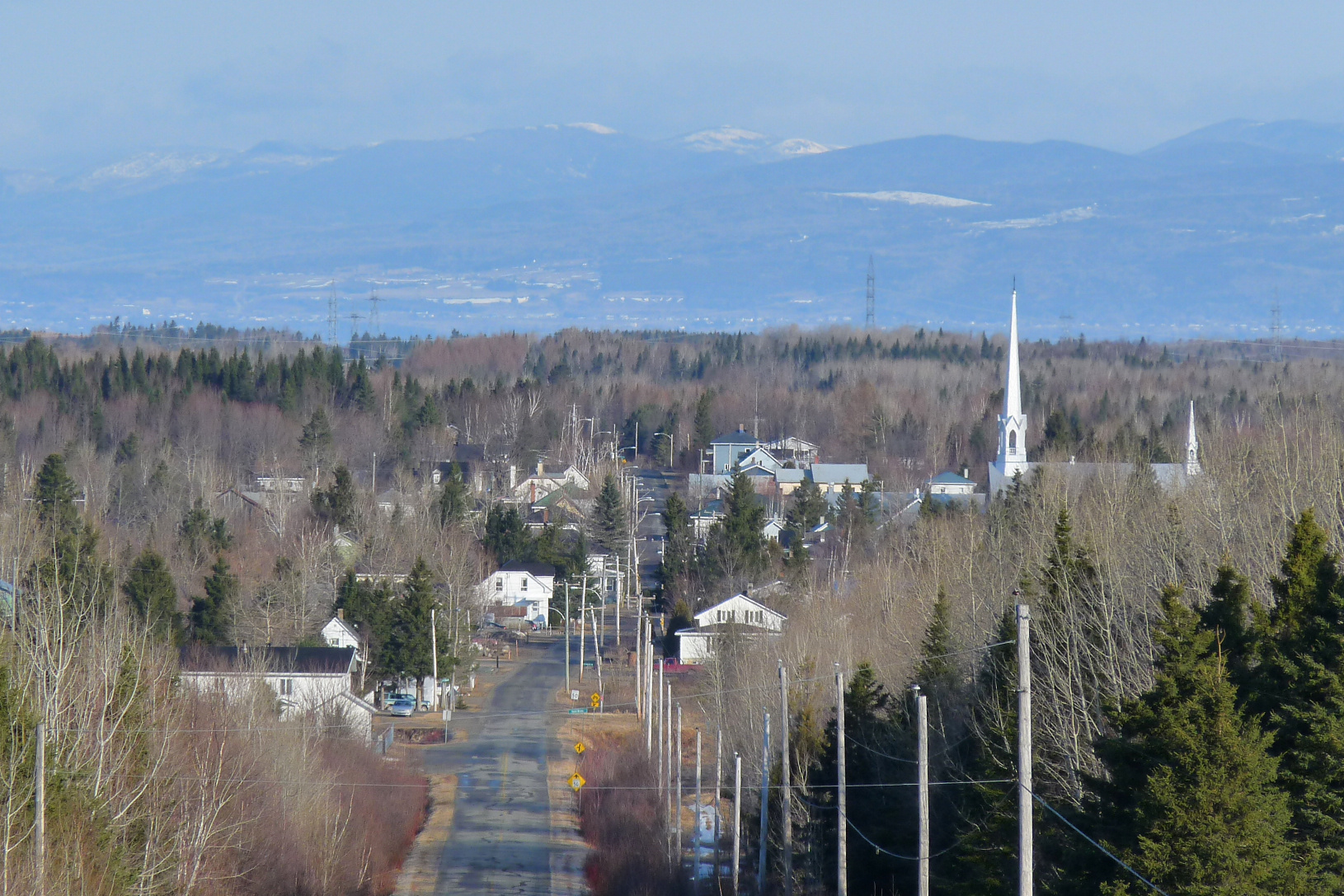

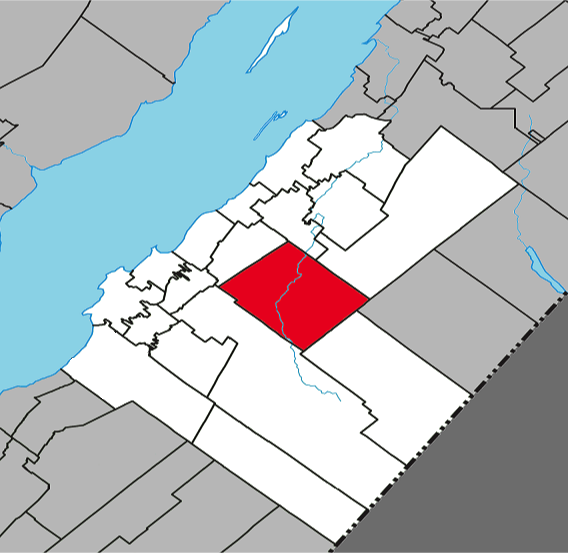
- Location within Kamouraska RCM

- Location in eastern Quebec
- Coordinates: 47°27′N 69°45′W
- Country: Canada
- Province: Quebec
- Region: Bas-Saint-Laurent
- RCM: Kamouraska
- Constituted: January 1, 1887

Government
  - Mayor: Gilles Plourde
  - Federal riding: Côte-du-Sud—Rivière-du-Loup—Kataskomiq—Témiscouata
  - Prov. riding: Côte-du-Sud

Area
  - Total: 187.80 km^{2} (72.51 sq mi)
  - Land: 188.44 km^{2} (72.76 sq mi)
- There is an apparent contradiction between two authoritative sources

Population (2021)
  - Total: 515
  - Density: 2.7/km^{2} (7.0/sq mi)
  - Pop 2016-2021: ▼4.8%
  - Dwellings: 270
- Time zone: UTC−5 (EST)
  - Summer (DST): UTC−4 (EDT)
- Postal code(s): G0L 2M0
- Area codes: 418 and 581
- Highways: No major routes
- Website: www.stbrunokam.qc.ca

Saint-Bruno-de-Kamouraska (French pronunciation: [sɛ̃ bʁyno də kamuʁaska]) is a municipality in the Canadian province of Quebec, located in the Kamouraska Regional County Municipality.

== History ==
The land was divided up according to the township system introduced by the British regime. Woodbrige Township corresponds for the most part to the parish boundaries. Due to a shortage of land in the Seigneurie de Kamouraska, the township began to be settled around 1834. The municipality was officially created in 1887 under the name Woodbridge. In 1986 the name of Woodbridge was changed to the current Saint-Bruno-de-Kamouraska. The municipality was the inspiration for François Pérusse's song St-Néant.

== Geography ==
=== Climate ===
Climate data for Saint-Bruno-de-Kamouraska, Quebec, 1981-2010 Normals (Extremes 1965-2001)
Month	Jan	Feb	Mar	Apr	May	Jun	Jul	Aug	Sep	Oct	Nov	Dec	Year
Record high °C (°F)	13.5 (56.3)	10.0 (50.0)	16.5 (61.7)	26.5 (79.7)	32.0 (89.6)	32.0 (89.6)	33.0 (91.4)	37.8 (100.0)	29.0 (84.2)	26.1 (79.0)	20.0 (68.0)	12.5 (54.5)	37.8 (100.0)
Mean daily maximum °C (°F)	−7.3 (18.9)	−5.1 (22.8)	−0.4 (31.3)	6.5 (43.7)	14.0 (57.2)	19.5 (67.1)	22.4 (72.3)	21.1 (70.0)	16.0 (60.8)	9.6 (49.3)	2.7 (36.9)	−3.7 (25.3)	7.9 (46.2)
Daily mean °C (°F)	−12.2 (10.0)	−10.0 (14.0)	−4.7 (23.5)	2.5 (36.5)	9.0 (48.2)	14.3 (57.7)	17.0 (62.6)	15.9 (60.6)	11.5 (52.7)	5.7 (42.3)	−0.7 (30.7)	−8.0 (17.6)	3.4 (38.1)
Mean daily minimum °C (°F)	−17.0 (1.4)	−14.8 (5.4)	−9.0 (15.8)	−1.6 (29.1)	4.1 (39.4)	9.0 (48.2)	11.6 (52.9)	10.8 (51.4)	7.0 (44.6)	1.8 (35.2)	−4.1 (24.6)	−12.2 (10.0)	−1.2 (29.8)
Record low °C (°F)	−35.0 (−31.0)	−33.3 (−27.9)	−28.0 (−18.4)	−20.0 (−4.0)	−9.4 (15.1)	0.0 (32.0)	4.4 (39.9)	3.0 (37.4)	−3.3 (26.1)	−9.4 (15.1)	−20.6 (−5.1)	−30.0 (−22.0)	−35.0 (−31.0)
Average precipitation mm (inches)	70.5 (2.78)	67.2 (2.65)	70.3 (2.77)	77.9 (3.07)	110.6 (4.35)	94.0 (3.70)	91.8 (3.61)	99.2 (3.91)	78.7 (3.10)	83.1 (3.27)	85.4 (3.36)	69.2 (2.72)	998.0 (39.29)
Average snowfall cm (inches)	62.5 (24.6)	55.4 (21.8)	42.7 (16.8)	16.0 (6.3)	0.6 (0.2)	0.0 (0.0)	0.0 (0.0)	0.0 (0.0)	0.0 (0.0)	1.2 (0.5)	26.4 (10.4)	58.7 (23.1)	263.5 (103.7)
Source: Environment Canada

== Demographics ==
=== Population ===
Population trend:

Census	Population	Change (%)
2021	515	▼4.8%
2016	541	▲1.3%
2011	534	0.0%
2006	534	▼3.3%
2001	552	▲4.3%
1996	529	▼7.5%
1991	572	▼7.6%
1986	619	▼7.7%
1981	671	▼1.0%
1976	678	▼11.0%
1971	762	▲2.1%
1966	746	▼12.6%
1961	854	▼27.6%
1956	1,180	▲3.7%
1951	1,138	▼9.5%
1941	1,257	▲3.6%
1931	1,213	▲17.5%
1921	1,032	▲10.1%
1911	937	▲31.8%
1901	711	▲3.0%
1891	690	N/A

== Government ==
- Mayor: Gilles Plourde
- Councillors: Gilles Beaulieu, Marie-Josée Caron, Bernard Fortin, Matthieu Gagné, Julie Nadeau and one vacated seat

== Notable people ==
- Gabrielle Filteau-Chiba, Novelist

== See also ==
- List of municipalities in Quebec
