= Saint-Gabriel-Lalemant, Quebec =

Saint-Gabriel-Lalemant
- Municipality
- Municipalité de Saint-Gabriel-Lalemant
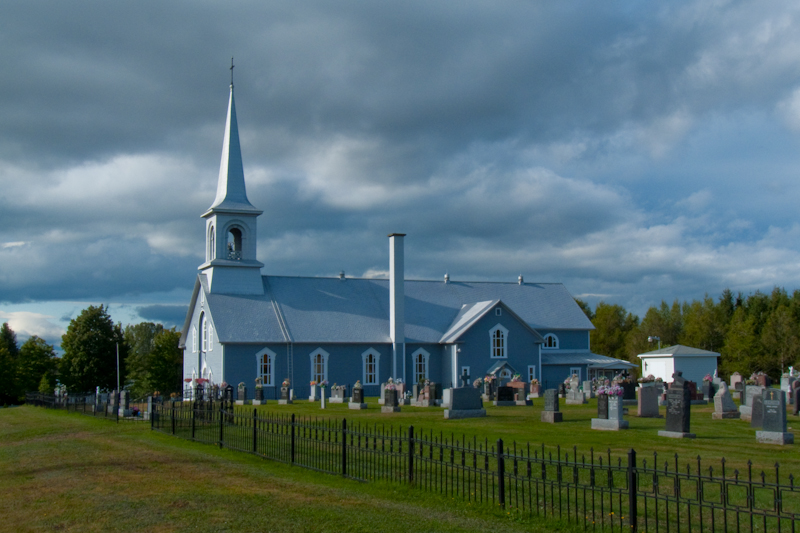
- Saint-Gabriel-Lalemant Church

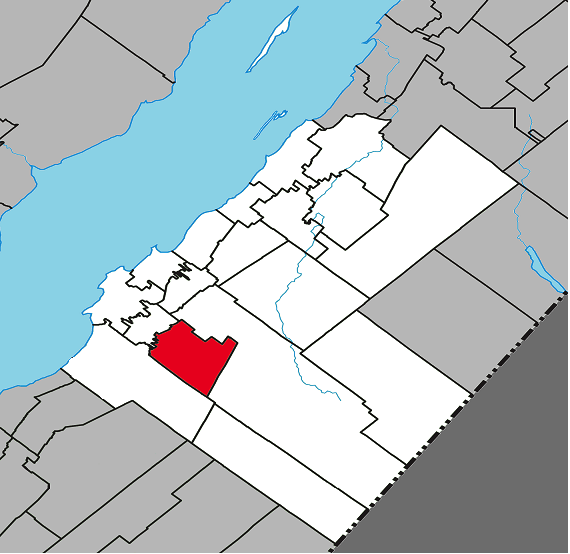
- Location within Kamouraska RCM

- Location in eastern Quebec
- Coordinates: 47°23′N 69°56′W
- Country: Canada
- Province: Quebec
- Region: Bas-Saint-Laurent
- RCM: Kamouraska
- Constituted: May 27, 1939

Government
  - Mayor: Gilles DesRosiers
  - Federal riding: Côte-du-Sud—Rivière-du-Loup—Kataskomiq—Témiscouata
  - Prov. riding: Côte-du-Sud

Area
  - Total: 78.80 km^{2} (30.42 sq mi)
  - Land: 77.92 km^{2} (30.09 sq mi)

Population (2021)
  - Total: 660
  - Density: 8.5/km^{2} (22/sq mi)
  - Pop 2016-2021: ▼7.8%
  - Dwellings: 359
- Time zone: UTC−5 (EST)
  - Summer (DST): UTC−4 (EDT)
- Postal code(s): G0L 3E0
- Area codes: 418 and 581
- Highways: No major routes
- Website: www.saintgabriellalemant.qc.ca

Saint-Gabriel-Lalemant (French pronunciation: [sɛ̃ ɡabʁijɛl lalmɑ̃]) is a municipality in the Canadian province of Quebec, located in the Kamouraska Regional County Municipality. The municipality is named for St. Gabriel Lalemant, one of the Canadian Martyrs.

== Demographics ==
In the 2021 Census of Population conducted by Statistics Canada, Saint-Gabriel-Lalemant had a population of 660 living in 315 of its 369 total private dwellings, a change of −7.8% from its 2016 population of 716. With a land area of 77.92 km^{2} (30.09 sq mi), it had a population density of 8.5/km^{2} (21.9/sq mi) in 2021.

Population trend:

Census	Population	Change (%)
2021	660	▼7.8%
2016	716	▼10.4%
2011	799	▲1.4%
2006	788	▼8.3%
2001	859	▼2.7%
1996	883	▼2.0%
1991	901	▼10.5%
1986	1,007	▼8.1%
1981	1,096	▼0.5%
1976	1,101	▼7.8%
1971	1,194	▼12.4%
1966	1,363	▲2.9%
1961	1,324	▼0.8%
1956	1,335	▲2.9%
1951	1,297	▲17.6%
1941	1,103	N/A

== Government ==
- Mayor: Gilles DesRosiers
- Councillors: Francine Bard, Stéphanie Bard, Danielle D’Anjou, Gabriel D’Anjou, Marilyne Lévesque, Gilles Ouellet

== See also ==
- List of municipalities in Quebec
