= Mont-Carmel, Quebec =

Mont-Carmel
- Municipality
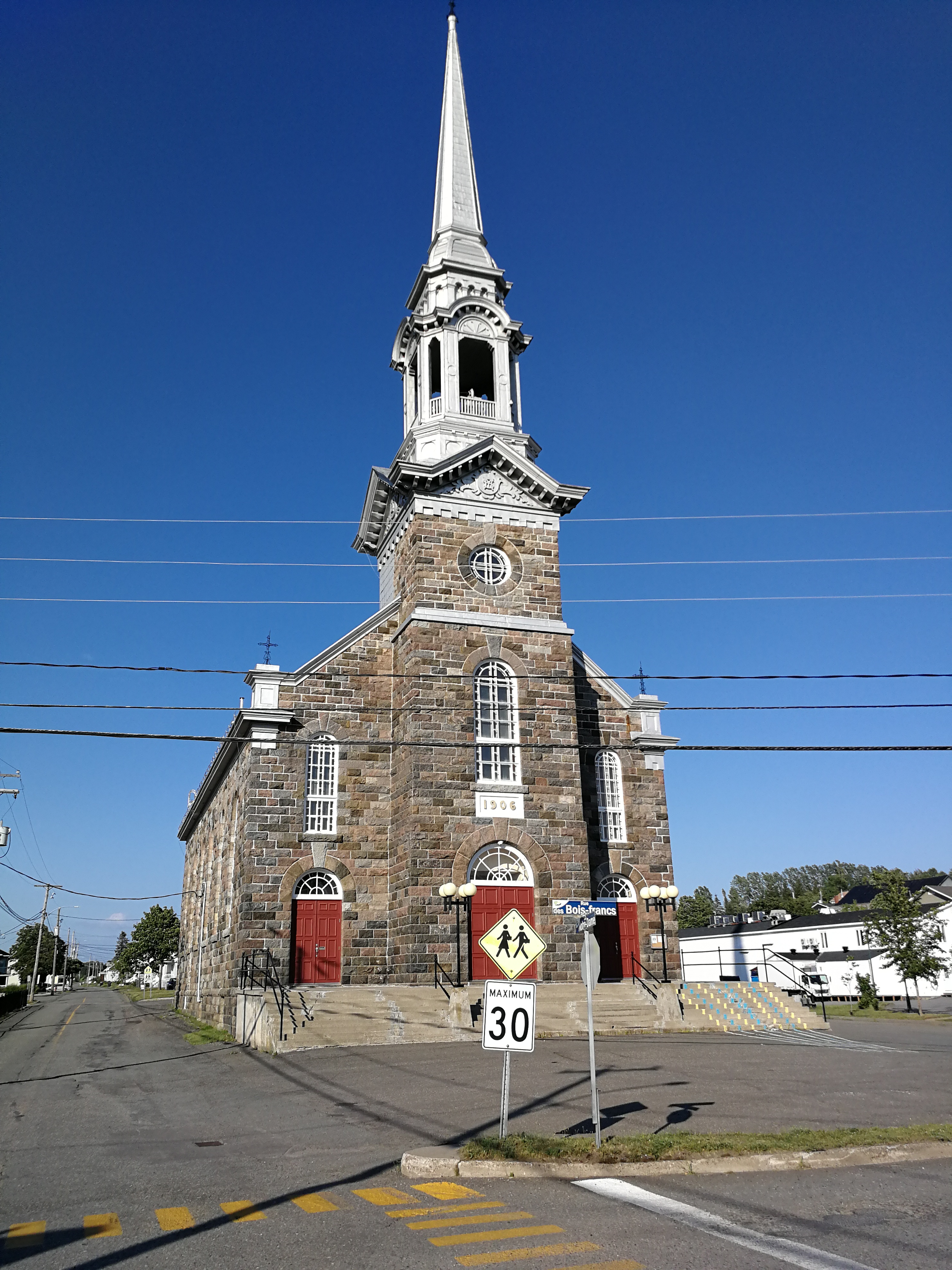

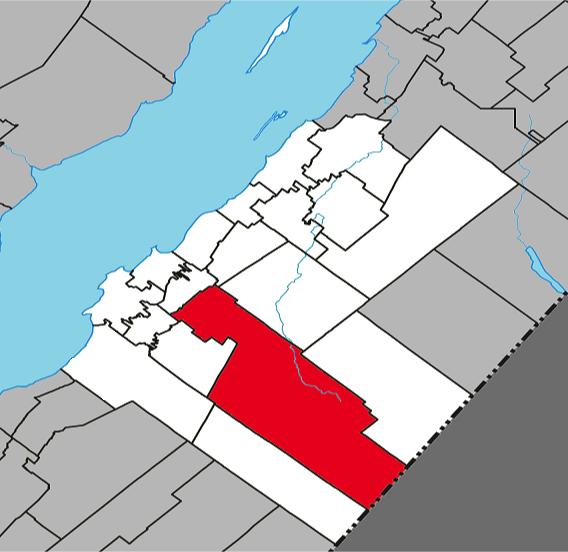
- Location within Kamouraska RCM

- Location in eastern Quebec
- Coordinates: 47°26′23″N 69°51′31″W
- Country: Canada
- Province: Quebec
- Region: Bas-Saint-Laurent
- RCM: Kamouraska
- Constituted: July 1, 1855

Government
  - Mayor: Denis Lévesque
  - Federal riding: Côte-du-Sud—Rivière-du-Loup—Kataskomiq—Témiscouata
  - Prov. riding: Côte-du-Sud

Area
  - Total: 438.60 km^{2} (169.34 sq mi)
  - Land: 428.26 km^{2} (165.35 sq mi)

Population (2021)
  - Total: 1,160
  - Density: 2.7/km^{2} (7.0/sq mi)
  - Pop 2016-2021: ▲2.9%
  - Dwellings: 713
- Time zone: UTC−5 (EST)
  - Summer (DST): UTC−4 (EDT)
- Postal code(s): G0L 1W0
- Area codes: 418 and 581
- Highways: R-287
- Website: www.mont-carmel.ca

Mont-Carmel (French pronunciation: [mɔ̃ kaʁmɛl]) is a municipality in the Canadian province of Quebec, located in the Kamouraska Regional County Municipality, on the Canada–United States border.

== History ==
Mont-Carmel was created in 1855. Not long after its creation, the name became Notre-Dame-du-Mont-Carmel but, during the middle of the 20th century, the name was officialised as simply Mont-Carmel.

== Geography ==
Spanning over 75% of the width of the Bas-Saint-Laurent region in which it resides, Mont-Carmel is the second largest subdivision within the Kamouraska Regional County Municipality and borders the United States at its southeast limit.

=== Communities and locations ===
The following designated areas reside within the municipality's boundaries:

- Eatonville – a hamlet located at 47°20′16″N 69°41′01″W
- Lac-de-l'Est – a vacation cottage community located at 47°13′39″N 69°35′26″W

== Demographics ==
Historical census populations – Mont-Carmel

Year	Pop.	±%
1861	598	—
1871	985	+64.7%
1881	1,168	+18.6%
1891	1,075	−8.0%
1901	1,084	+0.8%
1911	1,282	+18.3%
1921	1,346	+5.0%
1931	1,356	+0.7%
1941	1,576	+16.2%
1951	1,761	+11.7%
1956	1,971	+11.9%
1961	1,895	−3.9%

Year	Pop.	±%
1966	1,865	−1.6%
1971	1,742	−6.6%
1976	1,582	−9.2%
1981	1,445	−8.7%
1986	1,380	−4.5%
1991	1,303	−5.6%
1996	1,287	−1.2%
2001	1,244	−3.3%
2006	1,198	−3.7%
2011	1,136	−5.2%
2016	1,127	−0.8%
2021	1,160	+2.9%

Source: Statistics Canada

Private dwellings occupied by usual residents (2021): 534 (out of 713 total)

== Government ==
=== Municipal council ===
- Mayor: Denis Lévesque
- Councillors: Josée-Ann Dumais, Louis Lahaye-Roy, Mélanie Lévesque, Jimmy Paquet-Cormier, Diane Rancourt, Julie St-Pierre

== See also ==
- List of municipalities in Quebec
