= Sayabec =

- Municipality
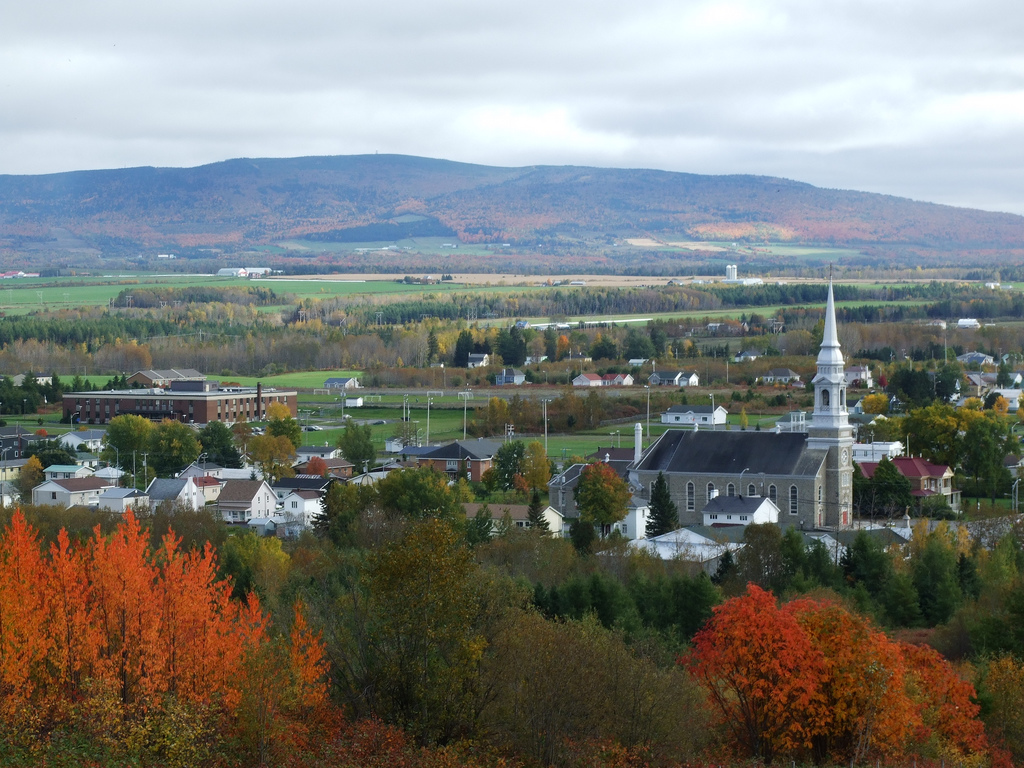

- Coat of arms

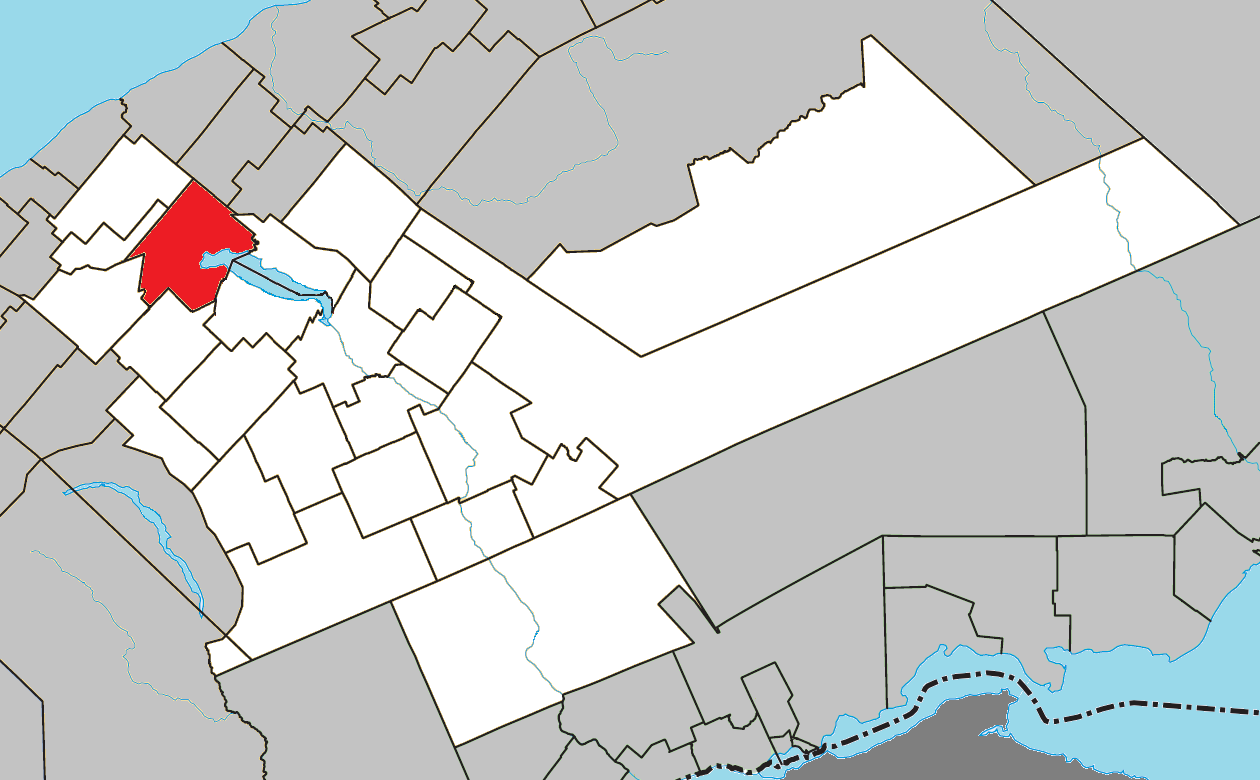
- Location within La Matapédia RCM

- Location in eastern Quebec
- Coordinates: 48°34′N 67°41′W
- Country: Canada
- Province: Quebec
- Region: Bas-Saint-Laurent
- RCM: La Matapédia
- Settled: mid 19th century
- Constituted: December 24, 1982

Government
  - Mayor: Lorenzo Ouellet
  - Fed. riding: Rimouski-Neigette—Mitis—Matapédia—Les Basques
  - Prov. riding: Matane-Matapédia-Mitis

Area
  - Total: 140.32 km^{2} (54.18 sq mi)
  - Land: 130.31 km^{2} (50.31 sq mi)

Population (2021)
  - Total: 1,706
  - Density: 13.1/km^{2} (34/sq mi)
  - Change 2016-21: ▼6.8%
  - Dwellings: 872
- Time zone: UTC−5 (EST)
  - Summer (DST): UTC−4 (EDT)
- Postal code(s): G0J 3K0
- Area codes: 418, 581
- Highways: R-132
- Website: www.municipalitesayabec.com

Sayabec (/seɪbɛk/; French: [sebɛk]) is a municipality located in the La Matapédia Regional County Municipality (RCM) in Bas-Saint-Laurent, Quebec, Canada. It is located in the Matapédia Valley between the Chic-Choc Mountains of the Appalachian near Lake Matapédia. The main activities of the village are agriculture and forestry. It has a population of approximately 2,000, the third biggest municipality in its RCM after Amqui and Causapscal. Due to the presence of the chipboards plant called Panval, the biggest industry of the valley, Sayabec is an important regional economic centre.

The territory was historically occupied by Mi'kmaq people, a First Nation who occupied much of the Gaspé Peninsula. Its first French Canadian inhabitant was Pierre Brochu, who came in 1833. At the end of the 19th century settlers began to come in the region to work in sawmills. The municipality was first officially created in 1887 as a school municipality under the name Sainte-Marie-de-Sayabec. The Catholic parish was erected in 1894. In 1917, the village of Saindon was created, and it took the name of Sayabec in 1951. Today municipality was formed in 1982 through the merger of the parish municipality of Sainte-Marie-de-Sayabec and the village municipality of Sayabec.

The municipality's main transportation link is the Quebec Route 132 which loops around the Gaspé Peninsula back towards the Mont-Joli area northwest of Sayabec. It is also located along the Canadian National Railway (originally the Intercolonial Railway).

Sayabec is pronounced "Say-bec" (/se.bɛk/). This name comes from the Mi'kmaq language word sepeg, which means "full river" or "river obstructed by a beaver dam". In fact, the actual Mi'kmaq word is sakpediak, sak meaning "river" and pediak "full", but the Mi'kmaq used to say "sakbak" to be shorter. Other sources say that the name is from the Mi'kmaq word siapeg, which means "extension of the lake" or "small gulf".

Demonyms of Sayabec are "Sayabécois" for male gender and "Sayabécoise" for female.

== History ==
=== Early history ===
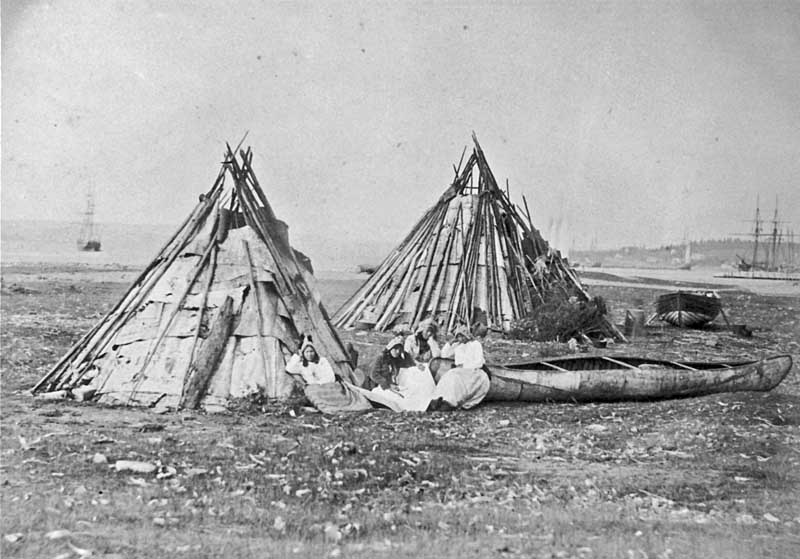
Mi'kmaq camp, circa 1857

The region was first frequented by the Mi'kmaq First Nation, beginning before the 17th century. In 1694, the lordship of Lake Madapequia was granted to Charles-Nicolas-Joseph D'Amours by the New France's governor, Louis de Buade de Frontenac. However, despite the laws of the time, this owner never inhabited nor exploited this territory, and he didn't officially bequeathed it. It is the construction of Kempt Road from 1830 to 1832 and Matapédia Road from 1847 to 1862 that allowed the colonization of the Matapédia Valley. Afterwards, the Intercolonial Railway, built from 1870 to 1872, has been an important catalyst for the development of the forest industry in the valley.

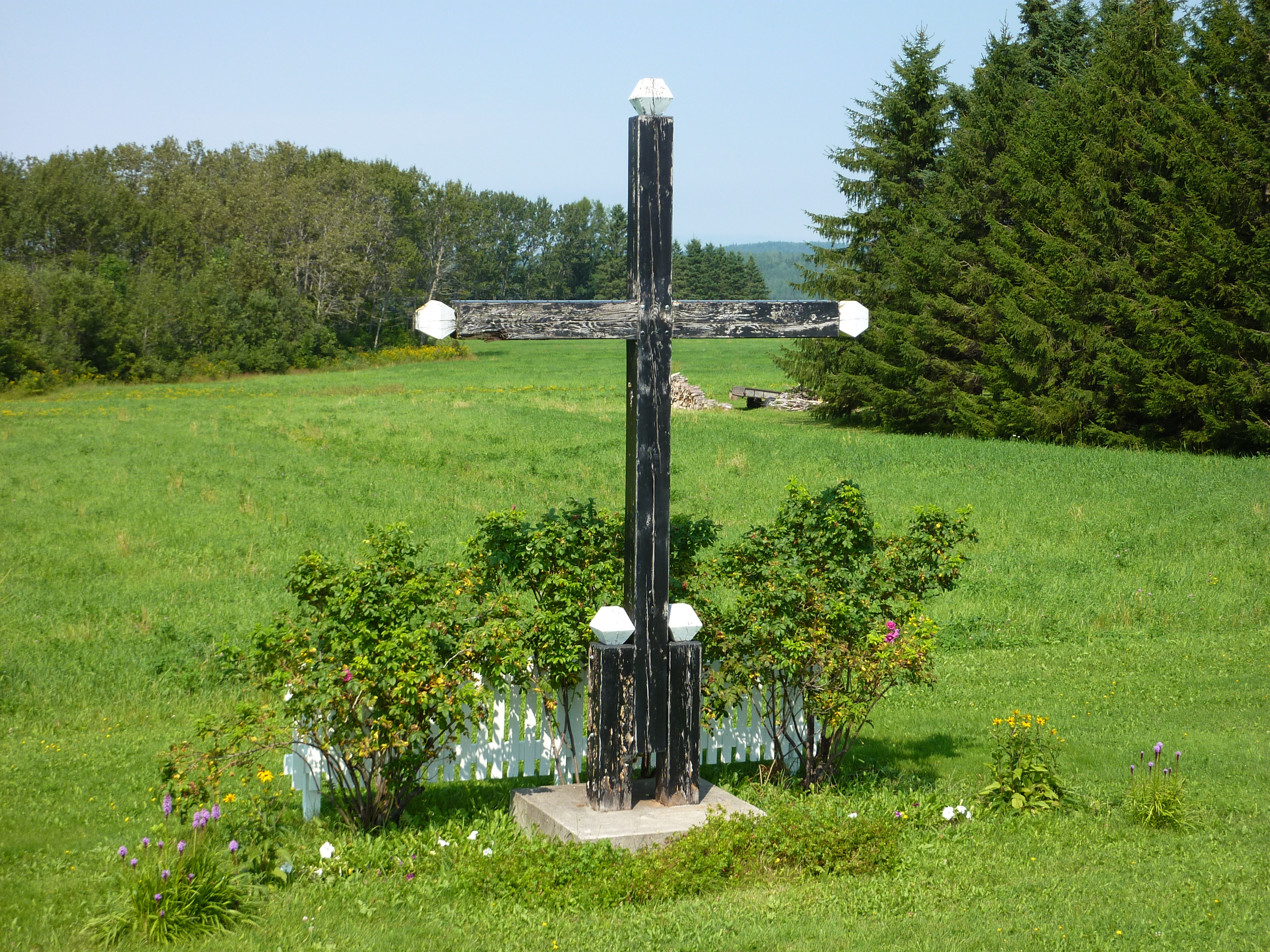
Roadside cross erected in 1875 by Marceline Brochu, wife of Pierre Brochu

The first inhabitant of Matapédia Valley was Pierre Brochu (1795-1871) born in Saint-Vallier, Bellechasse, who settled down at the tip of Matapédia Lake in 1833. He was operating a guard post along Kempt Road to offer relief and lodging to travellers and postilions. He occupied this position until his death in 1871. Around 1850 he sat up a sawmill at the head of Matapédia Lake. After his death his second wife Marcella Dumas continued to cultivate the land at this place for eight years.

Even if the first settler established himself as soon as 1833, it is the establishment of John Fenderson Company at the end of the 19th century that attracted more settlers in Sayabec. From this moment, more settlers, mainly from Rimouski and Matane counties, moved to Sayabec to work in the sawmills or to clear lands. From then on the forestry vocation of Sayabec was set and more people came to work in the sawmills then to settle as farmers.

The Fenderson family was the first real industrials of the valley. They bought a shingle mill in 1896. This mill was destroyed by fire the next year, and John Fenderson built a new sawmill for timbers and shingles as well as a plant for wood finishing. In 1910 he bought the lordship of Matapédia Lake as well as the sawmill of Val-Brillant, Quebec. The sawmill for timbers closed in 1918, and has been demolished in 1922, but the sawmill for wood finishing continued to operate full-time. Around 80% of products were exported to the United States. In 1922 John Fenderson & Company built a plant to transform hardwood into wood flooring. At the time it was the biggest industry in all Eastern Quebec, employing around 400 people. John Fenderson & Company's plants has been sold to John Fenderson Lumber Limited Company, and then to Domaine Seigneurial, before being definitely closed in 1952.

=== Development of the municipality ===
The municipality was first officially created on February 18, 1887 as a school municipality instead of a parish municipality unlike as usual in Quebec, because education was important for local settlers. The first school was built in 1892. For the construction of this school each Sayabécois had to provide 24 ft of 8 ft long squared cedar for each arpent of land he possessed.

In 1885 a catholic mission was established under the name of Sainte-Marie-de-Sayabec. The catholic parish had been canonically erected on November 29, 1894, and the first priest was Joseph-Cléophas Saindon, beginning on October 2, 1896. The parish municipality had been officially created on April, 1st 1895 under the same name of the mission established five years before. On May 20, 1895 the municipal council unanimously adopted a motion stipulating that French was the only language used in debates and municipal affairs. The first aqueduct was built in 1903. The same year started the construction of the first stone church. The caisse populaire (credit union) had been established in 1907 by the priest Joseph-Cléophas Saindon. The phone had been installed before the electricity, when the first switchboard was commissioned in 1908. In 1910 Sayabec became the first village of the province of Quebec to adopt macadam roads, when it applied it on route de l'Église (Church Road). Between 1912 and 1917 the grand chemin Matapédia (Matapédia Big Road) also known as chemin Militaire (Military Road) had been macadamized. In 1911 Compagnie électrique d'Amqui (Amqui Electric Company) built an hydroelectric power plant downstream of Matapédia Lake in order to provide electricity to Amqui, Val-Brillant and Sayabec. This allowed the installation of street lightning in 1914. Compagnie électrique d'Amqui held the exclusivity on the electric network for a 25 years period in exchange of providing street lightning. In 1922 Compagnie de Pouvoir du Bas-Saint-Laurent (Bas-Saint-Laurent Power Company) owned by Jules-André Brillant bought Compagnie électrique d'Amqui and became the only power distributor in the region until the nationalization of electricity in Quebec in 1963.

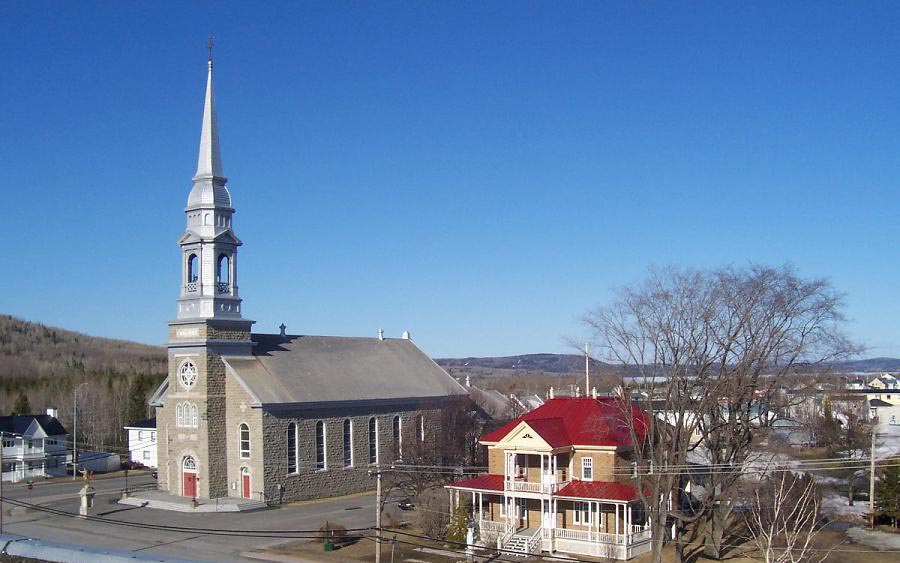
Sayabec's church

In 1912 the railway station opened. On March 28, 1917 the village split into two municipalities, when the village municipality of Saindon separated from the parish municipality of Sayabec. The village was named after the first priest, canon Joseph-Cléophas Saindon. On May 19, 1921 the village was once more divided, when the parish municipality of Saint-Cléophas was founded. Once again it had been named after priest Saindon. In 1927 Sainte-Paule, which was until then a mission of the catholic parish of Sayabec, separated to form its own municipality. In the 1920s the village counted 500 families. On February 18, 1929 a lightning destroyed most of the church; it has been rebuilt with the original walls in 1931. In May 1941 a corps of peace officers had been founded to ensure public order.

In 1942, Sayabécois adopted a strong position against conscription. At the beginning of the 1950s Sayabec counted a total of nine schools. In 1951 the village of Saindon adopted the name of Sayabec. The first telephone code assigned to Sayabec was "748", but in 1969 the current code "536" had been assigned to Sayabec and Saint-Cléophas. On March 6, 1962 an office of the Police provinciale du Québec (Quebec Provincial Police) opened in Sayabec; it closed on April 30, 1963. The municipality bought its first snowplow in 1969. On January 5, 1976 the municipality office had been sat up in the current city hall, which was an old Daughters of Jesus residence bought by the Matapédia School District. On December 24, 1982 the Parish Municipality of Sainte-Marie-de-Sayabec and the Village Municipality of Sayabec had been merged into one municipality under the current name of Sayabec.

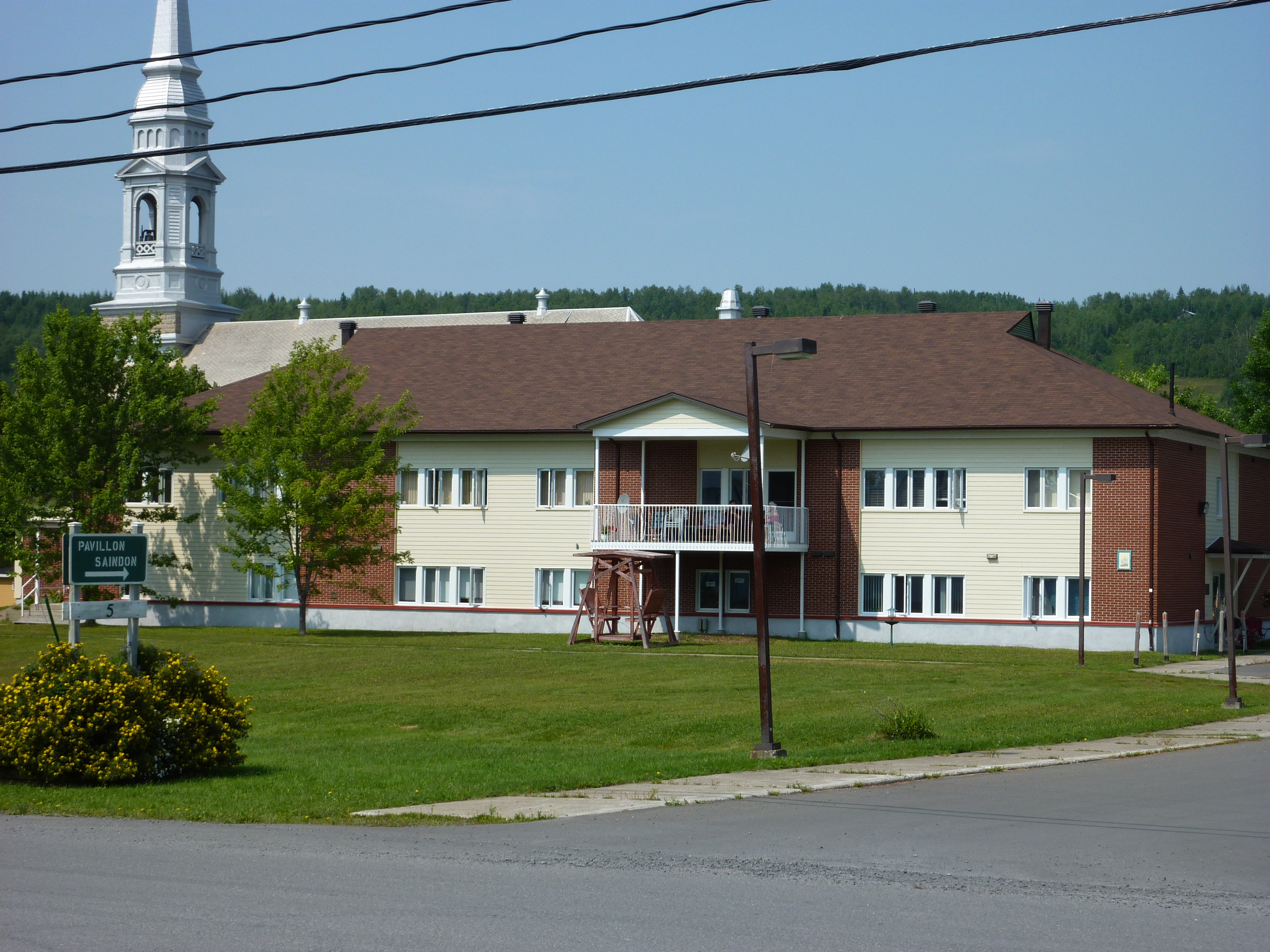
Pavillon Saindon

In 1968 eight HLMs had been built under a program of Société d'habitation du Québec (Quebec Housing Corporation). In 1984 an eleven-tenant building for the elderly called Pavillon Chanoine Saindon was built, and in 1990 a second eleven-tenant building for elderly called Appartements J.-A. Ross was built next to the first. Those lodging units are managed by the Sayabec Municipal Housing Office. Following a governmental decree of July 1, 1986 Sayabec had to close its municipal opencast dump, which opened in 1951. From then on, Sayabec's waste are transported to the regional landfill in Amqui. In 1988 Hydro-Québec installed a new power distribution station in Sayabec. On February 20, 1987 the municipality bought a warehouse to establish its municipal garage in order to house fire protection vehicles and municipal machinery.

On February 19, 1981 the implantation of the panels-furniture plant was officially announced. On August, 20 of the same year the Quebec Premier René Lévesque came to Sayabec. The Crown corporation Rexfor and the German firm Kunz were the two main shareholders of this plant named Panneaux de la Vallée shortened into Panval. On December 5, 1982 a thanksgiving mass had been celebrated at the occasion of the start of operations of Panval. Doctor Kunz himself attended this mass, and stated that this religious celebration was a first between all his plants around the world. In 1987 Panval was enlarged by the addition of a third laminating press, and then became the largest producer of laminated panels in North America. In 1989 Panval employed 425 full-time employees, and occupied 62,700 sq m. More than 1,000 trucks by month served the plant. However, the NAFTA had a bad impact on the production of Panval, and its personnel had been reduced to 225 employees. As of 2012, the plant belongs to Uniboard Canada and is the largest industry in the region.

== Geography ==
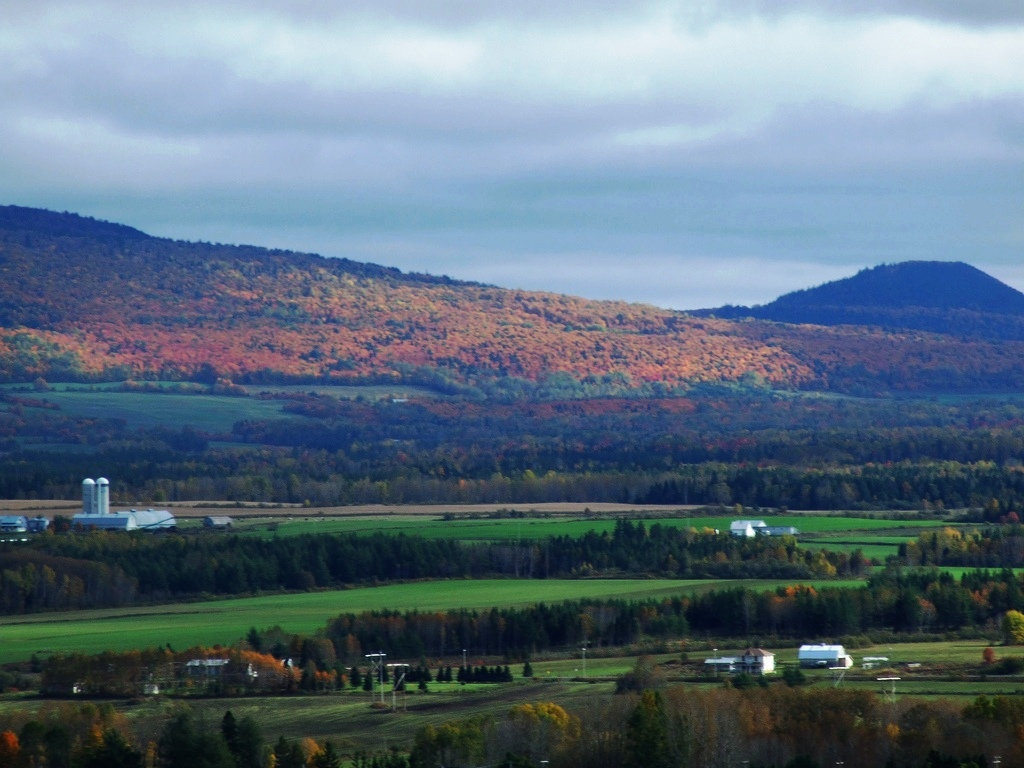
View of the Chic-Choc Mountains from Sayabec

Sayabec is located to the south of Saint Lawrence River on the Gaspé Peninsula in the Matapédia Valley. It is located 375 km to the northeast of Quebec City, 350 km to the west of Gaspé, Quebec and 100 km to the north of New Brunswick. The main cities in the vicinity of Sayabec are Rimouski at 60 km and Mont-Joli at 30 km to the west, Matane at 40 km to the north and Amqui at 20 km to the east.

Bordering municipalities are Saint-Moïse to the west, Val-Brillant to the east, Saint-Cléophas to the south and Sainte-Paule to the north.

Sayabec is divided into two sections: the main section located near Lake Matapédia, and a second section near Lake Malcolm known as the hamlet of Lac-Malcolm. Sayabec covers 130 km^{2}. Forests cover 47.9% of this territory, 8.4% is water and the rest (43.7%) is treeless. Approximately 35% of the territory is propitious for agriculture.

Sayabec is part of La Matapédia Regional County Municipality in the administrative region of Bas-Saint-Laurent. The catholic parish of Sayabec named Saint-Nom-de-Marie is part of the Roman Catholic Archdiocese of Rimouski. The municipality is part of the touristic region of Gaspésie.

The geography of Sayabec is located in the mountains range of the Appalachian on a side of Chic-Choc Mountains in the section of Notre Dame Mountains. It is at an altitude of 200 m and the summits reach 350 m.

The territory of Sayabec encompasses two watersheds. The first one sheds into Lake Matapédia, and covers approximately 60% of the territory. It includes Lake Matapédia as well as Sayabec and Saint Pierre Rivers. Lake Matapédia is known for lake and brook trout fishing. The second watershed empties into Blanche River and covers 40% of the territory. It includes mainly Malcolm and Squaw Lakes as well as Blanche, Arthur, Edouard and Sauvages Rivers. Malcolm Lake to the north of the village is known for fishing, nautical activities and camping.

Sayabec is located in a temperate climate. Between 2001 and 2010 maximum temperature was 34 Celsius, and minimum temperature was -41 Celsius.

== Demographics ==
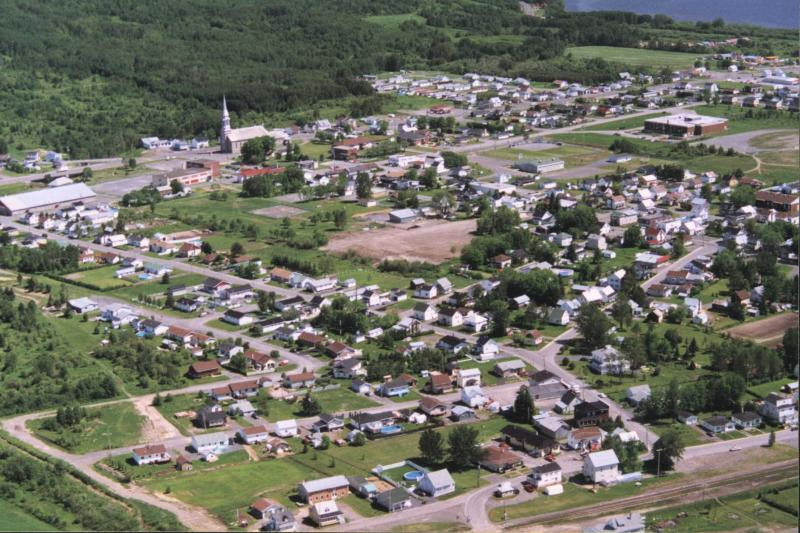
Aerial view of Sayabec

According to Statistics Canada, Sayabec's population in 2021 was 1,706, a 6.8% decrease from the 2016 population of 1,831. Most of the population is located in the southern portion of the municipal territory.

There are a total of 872 private housing units in Sayabec, 812 of which are occupied by regular residents. The majority of Sayabec's housing are single-family homes.

According to Statistics Canada's 2021 survey, no immigrants were counted in Sayabec. French is the mother tongue of nearly the entire population. About 13% of the population can speak English, and no residents has a language other than French or English as its native language.

Unemployment rate in Sayabec was 7.7% in 2021. Median income was $32,000, and 20.7% of the adult population had a lower-income status in 2005.

Canada census – Sayabec community profile

	2021	2016	2011
Population	1,706 (-6.8% from 2016)	1,594 (-14.5% from 2011)	1,864 (-4.6% from 2006)
Land area	130.31 km^{2} (50.31 sq mi)	130.73 km^{2} (50.48 sq mi)	130.48 km^{2} (50.38 sq mi)
Population density	13.1/km^{2} (34/sq mi)	12.2/km^{2} (32/sq mi)	14.3/km^{2} (37/sq mi)
Median age	52 (M: 52.8, F: 50.4)	49.5 (M: 49.4, F: 49.6)	46.8 (M: 46.9, F: 46.7)
Private dwellings	872 (total) 812 (occupied)	763 (total)	879 (total)
Median household income	$55,600	$46,464	$39,708

References: 2021 2016 2011

Historical Census Population - Sayabec, Quebec

Year	Pop.	±%
1986	2,308	—
1991	2,088	−9.5%
1996	2,069	−0.9%
2001	1,999	−3.4%

Year	Pop.	±%
2006	1,953	−2.3%
2011	1,864	−4.6%
2016	1,831	−1.8%
2021	1,706	−6.8%

Source: Statistics Canada

=== Language ===
Canada Census Mother Tongue - Sayabec, Quebec
Census	Total	French			English			French & English			Other		
Year	Responses	Count	Trend	Pop %	Count	Trend	Pop %	Count	Trend	Pop %	Count	Trend	Pop %
2021	1,710	1,695	▲0.3%	99.1%	5	▼16.7%	0.3%	5	0.0%	0.3%	0	0.0%	0.0%
2016	1,580	1,560	▼13.1%	98.7%	10	▲100.0%	0.6%	5	▼50.0%	0.3%	0	0.0%	0.0%
2011	1,815	1,795	▼5.8%	98.9%	5	▲ n/a%	0.3%	10	▲ n/a%	0.6%	0	▼100.0%	0.0%
2006	1,910	1,905	▼1.8%	99.7%	0	▼100.0%	0.0%	0	0.0%	0.0%	10	▲ n/a%	0.5%
2001	1,955	1,940	▼1.8%	99.2%	10	▼50.0%	0.5%	0	▼100.0%	0.0%	0	0.0%	0.0%
1996	2,005	1,975	n/a	98.5%	20	n/a	1.0%	10	n/a	0.5%	0	n/a	0.0%

== Government ==
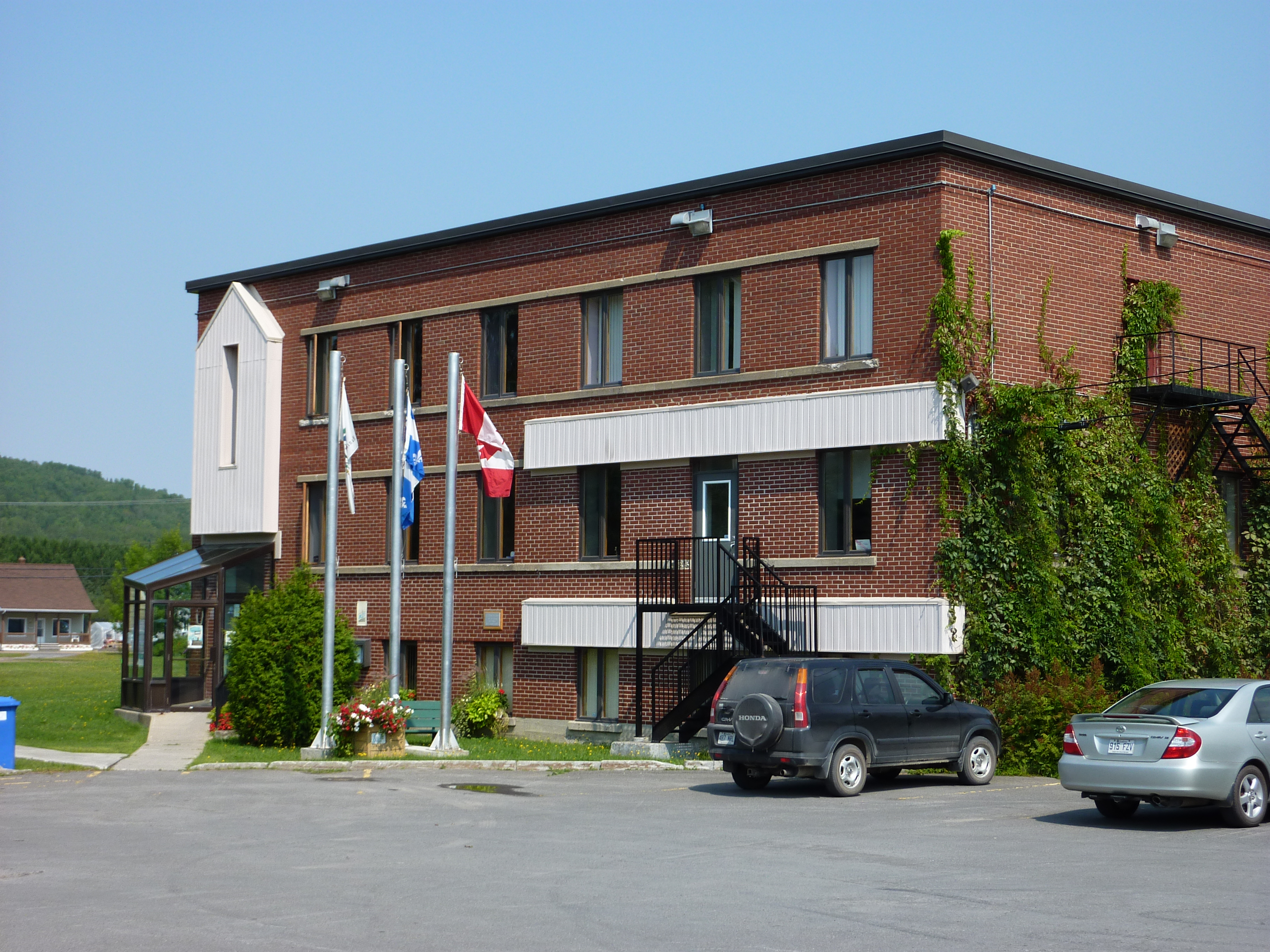
Sayabec's city hall

The municipal council of Sayabec for the 2025-2029 tenure is:

- Mayor: Lorenzo Ouellet
- Councillors: Frédéric Caron, Rémi Carrier, Hugues Berger, Patrick Santerre, Donald Lemieux, Lucie Bourgeois

List of former mayors (since formation of current municipality):

- Jean-Marie Leclerc (1982–1992)
- Joseph Théophile Gaétan Pilon (1994–1995)
- Jean-Yves Pelletier (1992–2002)
- Francis Ouellet (2002-2005)
- Danielle Marcoux (2005–2017)
- Marcel Belzile (2017–2025)
- Lorenzo Ouellet (2025-present)

== Infrastructure ==
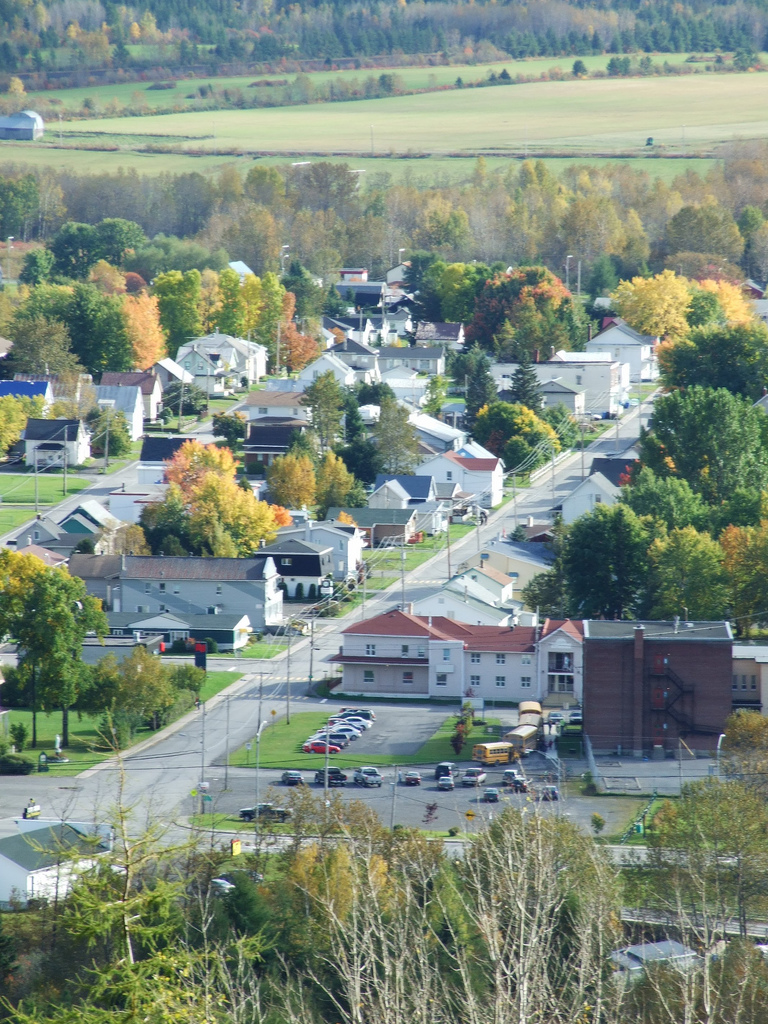
Rue de l'Église (Church Street)

Sayabec is located on the main transportation axis of the Gaspé Peninsula: Quebec Route 132. It is also located on the Canadian National Railway. Via Rail operates two passenger trains on this railway: Le Chaleur and L'Océan. They stop at Sayabec at a railway stop on demand. Intercity buses of Orléans Express serve Sayabec, using the Route 132 in direction of Rimouski and Matapédia, Quebec. The closest regional airport is located in Mont-Joli at 43 km to the northwest of Sayabec.

Sayabec was the first village of the province of Quebec to adopt macadam roads as soon as 1910, before the arrival of asphalt on the market.

== Education ==
Centre de services scolaire des Monts-et-Marées operates Francophone schools.

- École Sainte-Marie
- Polyvalente de Sayabec

Eastern Shores School Board operates Anglophone schools.

- Metis Beach School in Métis-sur-Mer.

== Notable people ==
- Joseph Kaeble, first French-Canadian soldier to be decorated by the Victoria Cross, the highest military distinction of the Commonwealth. He received this honor for an act of bravery during the First World War. He also received the Military Medal.
- David Pelletier, Olympic Gold Medalist in figure skating at the 2002 Olympic Winter Games (along with Jamie Salé)
- Irvin Pelletier, Member of the National Assembly of Quebec for the riding of Rimouski
- Jordan Caron, 2009 1st round draft pick of the Boston Bruins
- Jules Boucher, politician
- Claude Rioux, politician and judge
- Carolanne D'Astous-Paquet, singer who participated in Star Académie

== See also ==
- Sayabec railway station
- List of municipalities in Quebec
