= Rivière-Blanche station =

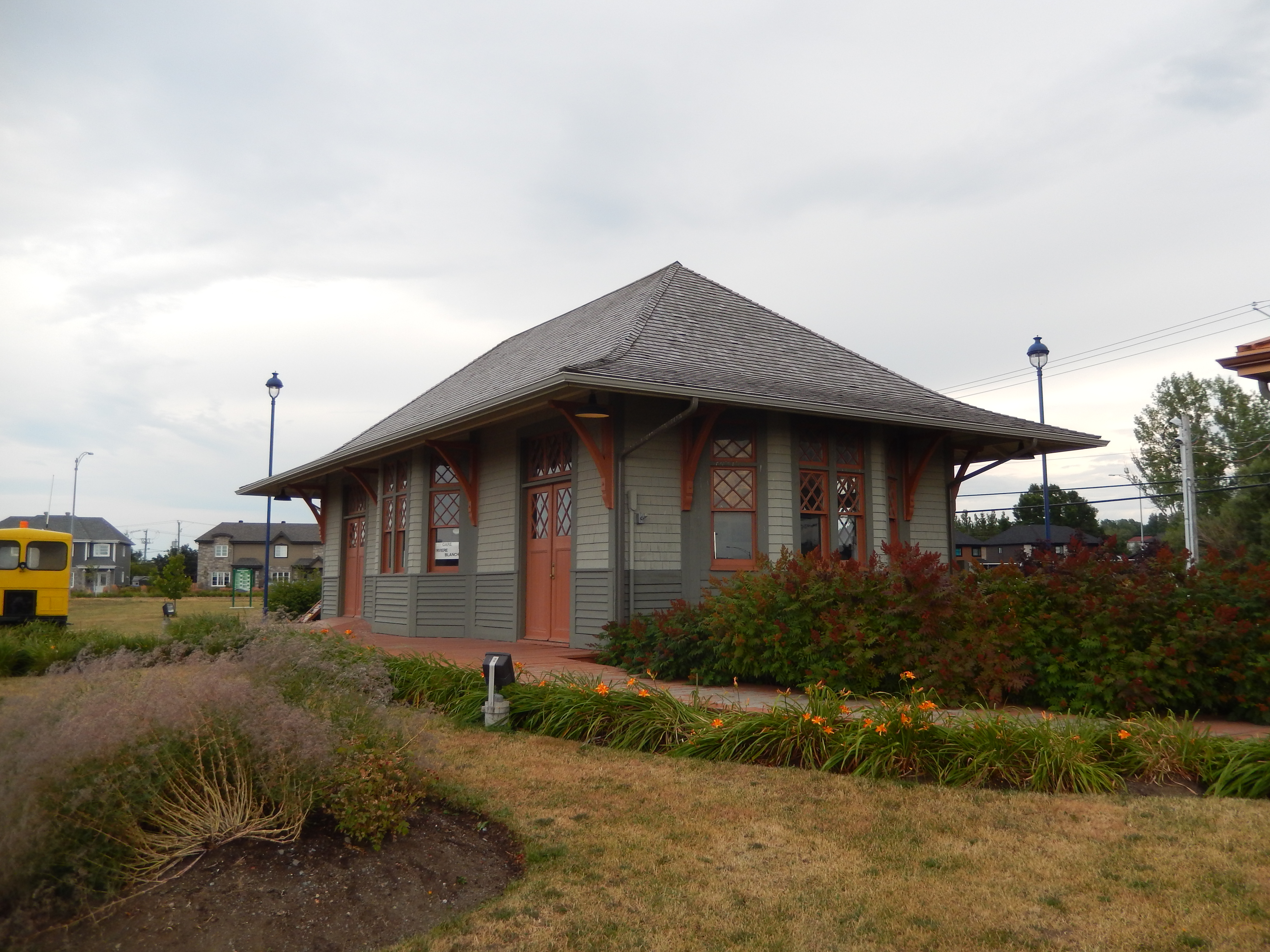
- The station in 2017
- Interactive map of the Rivière-Blanche station area

General information
- Location: originally: Saint-Ulric, Quebec, relocated to Mont-Joli, Canada
- Coordinates: 48°35′36″N 68°12′20″W
- Completed: 1910

Design and construction
- Architect

Patrimoine culturel du Québec
- Official name: Gare de Rivière-Blanche
- Designated: 2012

Rivière-Blanche station is a former Canadian train station on the Mont-Joli–Matane rail line. It is located in the local municipality of Saint-Ulric, in the regional county municipality of La Matanie in Québec.

Opnened in 1910 by the Canada and Gulf Terminal Railway, the station was closed, along with the rail line, in 1978.

The structure was saved from demolition by Pauline Cadieux who turned it into a museum; after Cadieux's death in 1996, the station was moved to Mont-Joli to become a tourist information office.

== Location along the rail line ==
The Rivière-Blanche station is located along the Mont-Joli-Matane line, between the Baie des Sables and Matane stations.

== History ==
The Rivière-Blanche station was opened in 1910 by the Canada and Gulf Terminal Railway (later part of Canadian National), when the rail line itself was put into service. The passenger station was built on the territory of the municipality of Saint-Ulric.

The station closed in September 1978, when passenger service along the rail line was discontinued.

== Railway heritage ==
=== Musée de la gare de Rivière Blanche ===
After the station was closed, the building was left abandoned. Near the end of that same year, Denis Vaugeois, minister for Cultural Affairs in Québec, was concerned about the station's future as it was one of the last passenger stations from this railway. On December 27, Veaugeois informed the rail company of his intention to have it designated as an historic property, but the rail company explained it had just sold the building to an individual who must have it moved from the property, as the bill of sale contained a clause saying the building would be demolished if it was not moved within a year from the date of transfer. The new owner, who had purchased the building at a public auction, had plans to transform it into a restaurant; this never happened due to the pending heritage designation on the building.

As the building was still in place as of the expiry date in November 1979, the rail company started planning for the demolition. Author Pauline Cadieux stepped in and purchased the building, also moving it as required. She was able to obtain a later deadline which allowed her, despite numerous difficulties, to bring the project to fruition in May 1983. The solution involved a reorientation of the building so it was no longer parallel to the railway line, rotating it so have its main facade was parallel with the street. After refurbishment and redevelopment, the building now served as an arts and crafts center and was opened again to the public as the Rivière Blanche station museum. The museum was inaugurated on August 17, 1983.

The museum evolved into a rail transport interpretation center in 1993. Pauline Cadieux died at age 89 in March 1996. Her museum closed that same year. By 1998, the building was once again vacant and questions were raised about the future of the station. The municipality of Mont-Joli came up with plans to move it and to have it transformed into a tourist information office. The project was firmly rejected by local organizations, including the Society of History and Genealogy of Matane, the majority of the council of mayors of the MRC de Matane and the municipality of Matane itself, all asking the Council of monuments and sites of Quebec (CMSQ), for protection against this hasty move. The CMSQ emphasized that the movement of provincial heritage assets from their place of origin is a problem that must be tackled.

=== Relocation to Mont-Joli ===
In 1998, the building was moved to the city Mont-Joli where it was renovated into a tourist information office. However, it was moved again in 2010, requiring that the original heritage designation placed on the site on October 4, 2012, be abrogated and a new designation had to be placed on the building that same day. On October 19 of that year, it was again registered as a heritage building after the new provincial law on cultural heritage was pronounced. The building was then completely renovated.
