= Sainte-Paule, Quebec =

Sainte-Paule
- Municipality
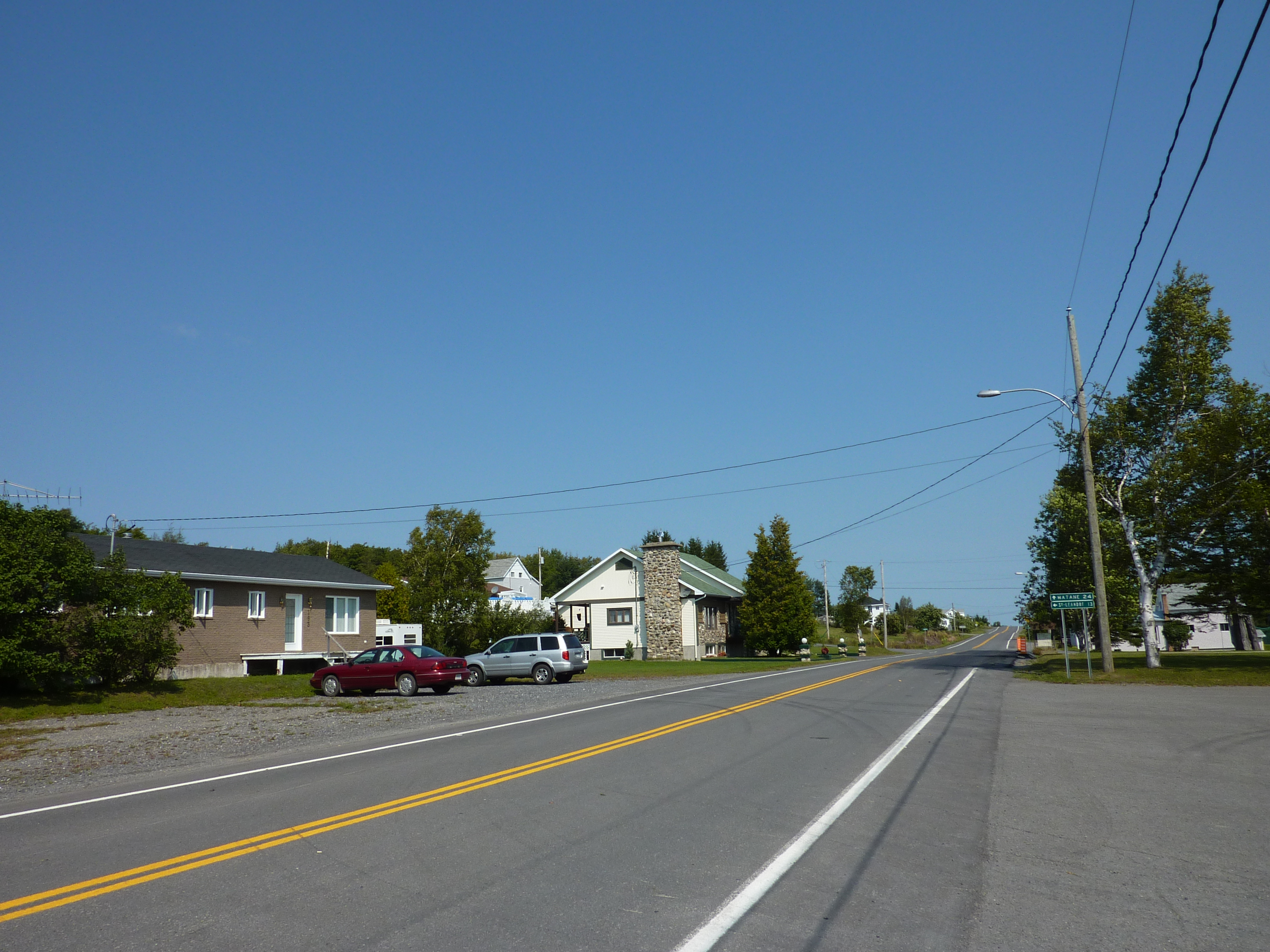

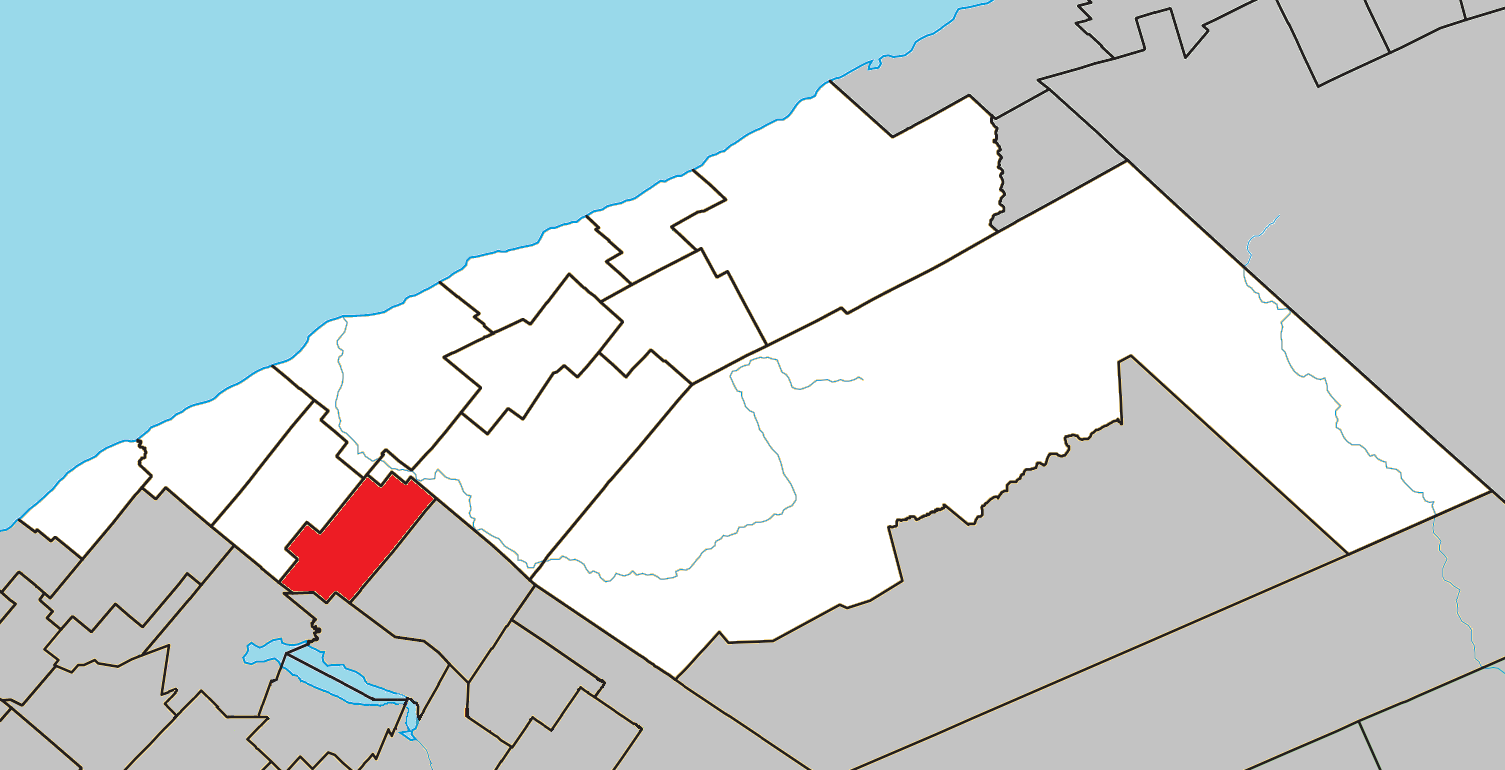
- Location within La Matanie RCM

- Location in eastern Quebec
- Coordinates: 48°40′N 67°33′W
- Country: Canada
- Province: Quebec
- Region: Bas-Saint-Laurent
- RCM: La Matanie
- Constituted: January 1, 1968

Government
  - Mayor: Philippe Savard
  - Federal riding: Gaspésie—Les Îles-de-la-Madeleine—Listuguj
  - Prov. riding: Matane-Matapédia-Mitis

Area
  - Total: 88.19 km^{2} (34.05 sq mi)
  - Land: 83.36 km^{2} (32.19 sq mi)

Population (2021)
  - Total: 247
  - Density: 3/km^{2} (7.8/sq mi)
  - Pop (2016-21): ▲6.0%
  - Dwellings: 217
- Time zone: UTC−5 (EST)
  - Summer (DST): UTC−4 (EDT)
- Postal code(s): G0J 3C0
- Area codes: 418 and 581
- Highways: No major routes
- Website: www.municipalite.sainte-paule.qc.ca

Sainte-Paule (French pronunciation: [sɛ̃t pol]) is a municipality in Quebec, Canada.

== History ==
The first inhabitants of this territory settled in 1912. However, a sawmill had already been built here in 1897. In the past, the area was called Colonie Val-Joubert in honour of Louis-Philippe Joubert, an influential lumber merchant from Sayabec who settled Sainte-Paule in 1903. Today, the name of Sainte-Paule's primary school is Val-Joubert. The Sainte-Paule Catholic mission was founded in 1923. The post office was opened in 1938 under the name Sainte-Paula. The caisse populaire was founded on September 15, 1945. The parish was canonically erected in 1948. The municipality of Sainte-Paule was officially founded on January 1, 1968 from unorganized territory. On June 14, 1968, the caisse populaire was closed.

== Demographics ==
=== Population ===
Canada census – Sainte-Paule community profile

	2021	2016	2011
Population	247 (+6.0% from 2016)	233 (+15.9% from 2011)	201 (-12.2% from 2006)
Land area	83.36 km^{2} (32.19 sq mi)	83.72 km^{2} (32.32 sq mi)	83.41 km^{2} (32.20 sq mi)
Population density	3.0/km^{2} (7.8/sq mi)	2.8/km^{2} (7.3/sq mi)	2.4/km^{2} (6.2/sq mi)
Median age	58.4 (M: 60.0, F: 57.2)	58.9 (M: 59.3, F: 58.6)	55.9 (M: 56.5, F: 55.5)
Private dwellings	217 (total) 129 (occupied)	209 (total)	186 (total)
Median household income	$.N/A	$62,592	$.N/A

Notes: Income data for this area has been suppressed for data quality or confidentiality reasons.
References: 2021 2016 2011

Historical Census Data - Sainte-Paule, Quebec

Year	Pop.	±%
1971	289	—
1976	164	−43.3%
1981	185	+12.8%
1986	188	+1.6%
1991	187	−0.5%
1996	228	+21.9%

Year	Pop.	±%
2001	199	−12.7%
2006	229	+15.1%
2011	201	−12.2%
2016	233	+15.9%
2021	247	+6.0%

Source: Statistics Canada

== See also ==
- List of municipalities in Quebec
