= Carolanne D'Astous-Paquet =

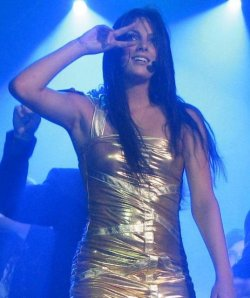
- Carolanne D'Astous-Paquet during a show of the Star Académie 2009 tour

Background information
- Born: 24 December 1990 (age 35); Sayabec, Quebec, Canada
- Occupation: Singer
- Years active: 2009–2017
- Website: official website

Carolanne D'Astous-Paquet (born 24 December 1990 at Sayabec, Québec, Canada) is a Québécoise singer known for appearing on the 2009 edition of reality TV competition Star Académie.

== Biography ==
Carolanne D'Astous-Paquet enrolled in her first singing lessons at age 8. She played hockey in a boys' league when she was 7 to 10 years old. In high school, she took part in a total immersion exchange program in British Columbia and developed a love for travel.

In 2007, she won the Tremplin de Dégelis (English: Springboard of Dégelis, a music and humour festival) in the 13–17 age group. That same year, she won the Trois-Pistoles song contest in the 16-and-over category.

Her career as a singer began in 2009 when she participated in the reality TV competition Star Académie, finishing second to Maxime Landry. During the competition she sang a duet of "Poker Face" with Lady Gaga. D'Astous-Paquet participated on the series album and toured Quebec with other contestants, including shows at the Bell Centre in Montreal.

In 2010, it was announced that D'Astous-Paquet would appear in a musical adaptation of Les Filles de Caleb (English: The Girls of Caleb) portraying Elise, a young woman rebelling against modern Quebec. She appeared alongside Bruno Pelletier, Luce Dufault, Daniel Boucher and Stéphanie Lapointe. The album of this folk opera, on which she plays a duet with Luce Dufault, was released on 25 October. The show sold more than 30,000 tickets before it premiered in Montreal.

In 2011, D'Astous-Paquet wrote on her Facebook page that she would start working on her first solo album that year, and would collaborate with Marie-Mai and her boyfriend, Fred St-Gelais. This was later announced elsewhere on the Internet, and that the album would contain all original songs. The work was later abandoned as D'Astous-Paquet changed direction with a folk/country-pop sound, collaborating with Amylie (of Les Filles), Marc Déry, Alexandre Désilets and Mathieu Leclerc.

In December 2011 D'Astous-Paquet played the role of Jasmina in the musical Sherazade, the Arabian Nights, directed by Yves Desgagnés in France.

Beginning 23 June 2012 D'Astous-Paquet took part in benefit shows for Bas-Saint-Laurent youth centres to be held in Sayabec, hosted by the band Les Vikings. She shared the stage with Marie Denise Pelletier, Wilfred Le Bouthillier, Stéphanie Bédard and Eva Avila. In the summer of 2013, she continued to perform at Les Vikings shows while working on her album.
