= Amqui station =

Railway station in Quebec, Canada

Amqui
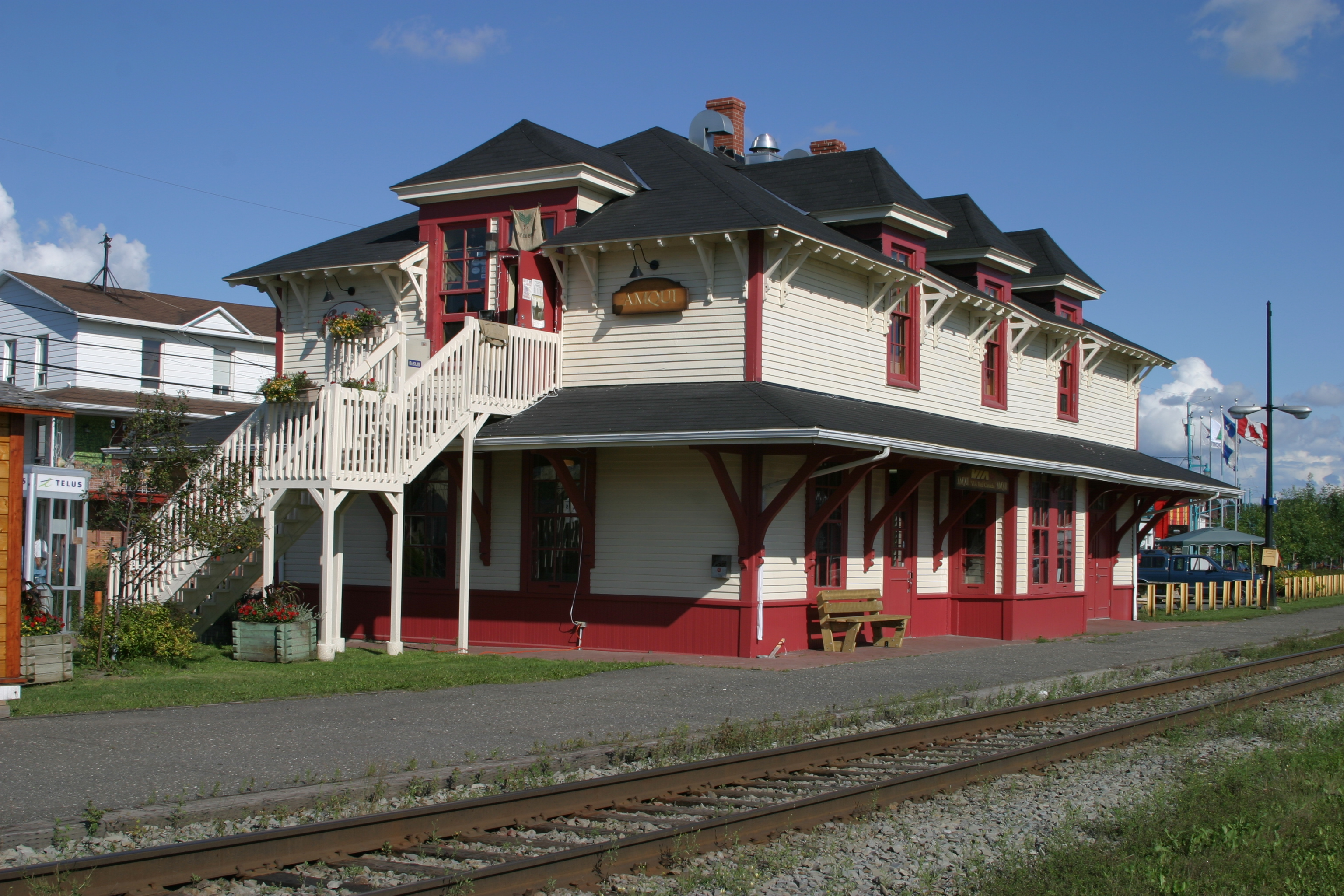

General information
- Location: 209, Boul. Saint-Benoît Ouest; Amqui, QC, Canada
- Coordinates: 48.4664°N 67.4361°W
- Platforms: 1 side platform
- Tracks: 1

Construction
- Structure type: Shelter
- Parking: Yes
- Accessible: Yes

Services
Preceding station	Via Rail	Following station
Sayabec toward Montreal	Ocean	Causapscal toward Halifax
Former services
Preceding station	Via Rail	Following station
Sayabec toward Montreal	Montreal–Gaspé (Suspended 2013-2027)	Causapscal toward Gaspé
Preceding station	Canadian National Railway	Following station
St. Lawrence Lbr. Company toward Montreal	Montreal – Moncton	Lac au Saumon toward Moncton
Location

Amqui station is a Via Rail station in Amqui, Quebec, Canada. Located on Boulevard Saint-Benoît Boulevard Ouest, it is a heated and semi-staffed shelter equipped with washrooms and is wheelchair-accessible. Amqui is served by Via Rail's Ocean; the Montreal – Gaspé train was suspended in 2013. Both trains share the same rail line between Montreal and Matapédia.

The station is representative of the boom in rail use in the late nineteenth and early twentieth century, the associated expansion of the railways in general, and the Intercolonial Railway of Canada (IRC) in particular. Amqui depended on the railway to transport their agricultural products and finished parts made of wood. Subsequently, Amqui became an important stop on the train's route from Montréal to Halifax, and from Montréal to Gaspé.

The design of the station Amqui is unusual for a station of the IRC. It is distinguished by its two-stage design, incorporating the housing of the station master and his family.

The Canadian National Railway station is a designated Heritage Railway Station.

== See also ==
- List of designated heritage railway stations of Canada
