= Mont-Joli station =

Railway station in Quebec, Canada

Coordinates: 48.5889°N 68.1895°W

Mont-Joli
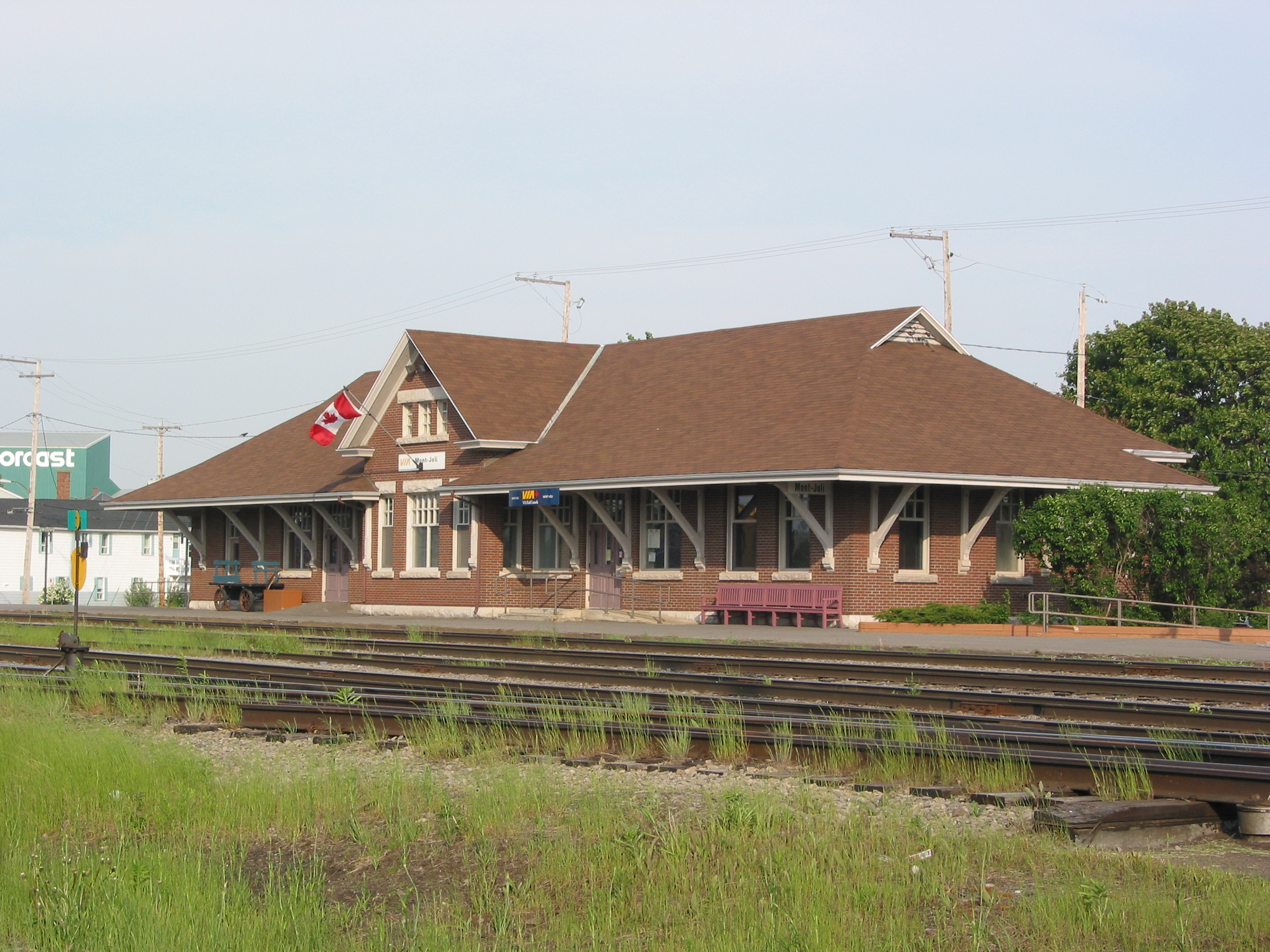

General information
- Location: 48 Avenue de la Gare; Mont-Joli, QC, Canada
- Platforms: 1 side platform
- Tracks: 4

Construction
- Structure type: Sign post
- Parking: Yes
- Accessible: Yes

Services
Preceding station	Via Rail	Following station
Rimouski toward Montreal	Ocean	Sayabec toward Halifax
Former services
Preceding station	Via Rail	Following station
Rimouski toward Montreal	Montreal–Gaspé (Suspended 2013-2027)	Sayabec toward Gaspé
Preceding station	Canadian National Railway	Following station
Luceville toward Montreal	Montreal – Moncton	St. Remi de Metis toward Moncton
Location

Mont-Joli station is a Via Rail station in Mont-Joli, Quebec, Canada. Located on Avenue de la Gare, it is staffed and is wheelchair-accessible. Mont-Joli is currently served by Via Rail's Ocean and was previously served by Montreal–Gaspé train as well until the latter was suspended in 2013. Both trains shared the same rail line between Montreal and Matapédia.

The Canadian National Railway station is a designated Heritage Railway Station.
