= Jules-André Brillant =

French Canadian entrepreneur

- Born: 30 June 1888; Assemetquagan mission, Matapedia River, Quebec, Canada
- Died: 11 May 1973 (aged 84); Mont-Joli, Quebec, Canada
- Occupation: Entrepreneur

Jules-André Brillant (30 June 1888 – 11 May 1973) was a French Canadian entrepreneur who was active in the Bas-Saint-Laurent region of Quebec from 1920 to 1962. He founded an electrical power company in 1922, a telephone company in 1927 and a shipping company operating in the Gulf of Saint Lawrence in 1929. He also owned a newspaper, two radio stations and a television broadcaster among other enterprises. He was active in politics, and openly admitted that this was a factor in his business success. After he retired his children took over the business empire, which soon fell apart, with the component companies sold to larger Canadian or American firms.

== Early years ==
Jules-André Brillant was born on 30 June 1888 in the Assemetquagan mission near Routhierville on the banks of the Matapedia River. His parents were Joseph Brillant and Rose Raîche. His father was an employee of the Canadian National Railway, and lived in turn in Assametquaghan, Petit-Métis and Saint-Octave de Métis before settling in Le Bic, his home town. Jules-André Brillant was baptized at Saint-Octave de Métis, where he received his primary education. He studied business, completing his education in New Brunswick. He was educated at St. Joseph's College in New Brunswick.

In 1907 Brillant became a junior clerk at the National Bank of Beauceville. A year later he went to open a branch in Matane. In January 1910 he became an accountant and assistant manager at Amqui. He fell ill with a lung disease, spent six months at a sanatorium in Lac-Édouard, and had to rest for another six months. The local priest in Amqui arranged for him to get a job with the electricity company of the Vallée de la Matapédia. Brillant was hired on 26 July 1911 to work as a salesman, getting subscriptions to the service. He became a manager, and then secretary-manager in February 1913.

== Business empire ==
=== Power company ===
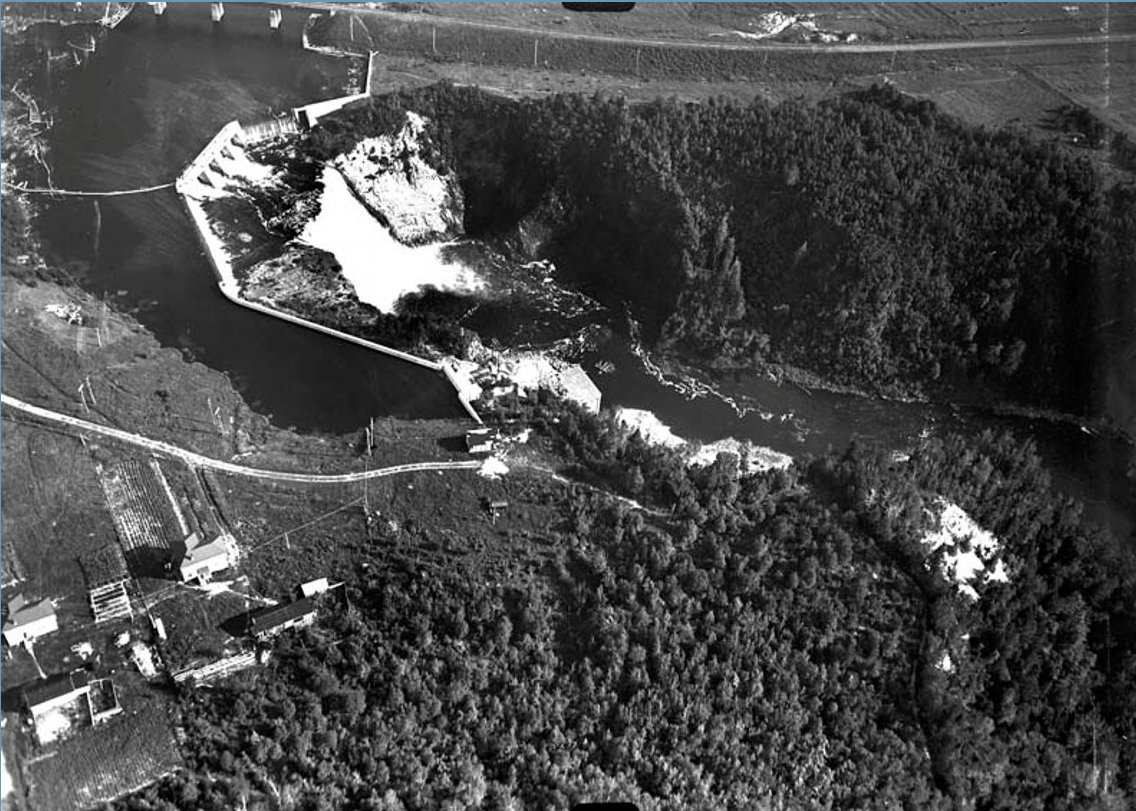
Mitis River dam and power plant, c.1927

In 1920 Brillant took a job as manager of the Hochelaga Bank in Rimouski, and moved to that town, which was very poorly supplied with electricity at the time. Brillant came up with a project to provide electricity to the different parts of Bas-Saint-Laurent, using a power plant at the Métis River Falls. He managed to get twenty people to each pay $20,000 to meet the price demanded by the owner, Elsie Reford, and obtained a purchase option in 1922. The Compagnie de pouvoir du Bas-Saint-Laurent (Lower St. Lawrence Power Company) was created on 18 July 1922, with Jules-André Brillant, Joseph Brillant and Paul-Émile Gagnon as the first directors. The company purchased the Elsie Reford Falls and had a dam built above the falls. On 22 October 1922 the 2.75 MW turbine came into service. It was formally inaugurated in a ceremony on 1 July 1923 attended by various notables.

On 27 December 1923, in Chicago, Brillant married Rose-de-Lima Coulombe. He had five children by Rose-de-Lima, who died of diphtheria in September 1933.

The Lower St. Lawrence Power Company grew fast through acquisition of small businesses. It became the largest power supplier in the region with a network of transmission lines serving Matane, Mont-Joli, Rimouski and beyond. In 1926 Brillant ran into financial difficulties and lost control of the company to the Central Public Service Corporation of Chicago. In effect the Quebec company was a subsidiary of the Chicago company, but with the same management. During the 1929 economic crisis the Chicago company suffered financially, and gradually the Canadians managed to buy back the Lower St. Lawrence Power Company between 1932 and 1935. The company expanded to supply electricity to the Bas-Saint-Laurent and part of the Gaspé Peninsula, not without difficulty. Its high rates were denounced by the newspapers in 1937, and the company struggled to meet demand in the 1940s despite adding diesel generators and submarine cables.

=== Telephone company ===
Brillant branched out from power into telephone service in 1927. At the time there were several telephone companies, but they had inadequate equipment and offered poor service. A long-distance call might involve the operators of several companies to make the connection, which then had very poor quality. Brillant acquired the main network of the national telephone company, which became the Quebec Telephone and Power Corporation in 1927. The company gradually expanded its network throughout Bas-Saint-Laurent, the Gaspé Peninsula, Beauce and the Portneuf region. By 1935 the network reached from Trois-Rivières to Matane. The company moved its headquarters from Quebec to Rimouski in 1937. It took the name Corporation de téléphone de Québec in 1947, and Québec Téléphone in 1955. Québec-Téléphone, later QuebecTel and then TELUS Québec, was one of Brillant's most important achievements.

=== Other enterprises ===
In 1923 Brillant bought Le Progrès du Golfe, the only newspaper in the region. In 1929 Brillant bought two shipping companies that he merged to form the Bas-Saint-Laurent Transport Company, which connected to the Côte-Nord. At first the company had three ships. Later it acquired more ships and provided service between Rimouski, Matane and all the ports on the Côte-Nord. In the early 1930s Brillant became involved in several projects which led to creation of the School of Arts and Crafts in 1936. In 1937 he founded the radio station CJBR-AM, affiliated with Radio Canada. (Note: The call sign CJBR stands for Canada Jules Brillant Rimouski)

On 1 February 1940, in Miami, Florida, Brillant married Agnès Villeneuve, daughter of Henri Villeneuve and Agnès Matthieson.

Brillant was an organizer of the Liberal Party for Eastern Quebec, and these activities contributed to the success of his businesses, as he admitted himself when he said, "faire de la politique, ça aide beaucoup pour les affaires" (involvement in politics helps a lot in business). Brillant managed to get the government to support creation of an elementary marine engineering school in 1943, and looked after its organization. He was involved in other companies such as the Canadian Cod Liver Oil Company and Rimouski Air Lines. In 1947 Brillant bought the Canada and Gulf Terminal Railway Company, with a line from Mont-Joli to Matane.

== Last years ==
In 1947 Brillant inaugurated CJBR-FM, one of the first private FM radio stations in Quebec, then in 1954 he founded CJBR-TV as a Radio-Canada affiliate. His son, Jacques Brillant, managed the CJBR group from 1954 to 1969. In the mid-1950s Brillant began to retire from management of his businesses, and sold most of his assets to his children. In 1962 Brillant handed over the presidency of Québec Téléphone to his son Jacques. The five children were not as interested in business as their father, and during the 1960s the Brillant empire fell apart. The Bas-Saint-Laurent Power Company was absorbed by Hydro-Québec in 1963 during the nationalization of electricity. In 1966 GTE took control of Québec-Téléphone. In 1969 CJBR-AM, CJBR-FM and CJBR-TV were sold to Power Corporation of Canada.

Jules-André Brillant died in Mont-Joli on 11 May 1973, aged 84, and was buried in Rimouski.

== Positions ==
Brillant held many private and public positions during his life:

Company president

- Compagnie électrique d'Amqui (Amqui Electric Company)
- Compagnie du pouvoir du Bas-Saint-Laurent (Lower Saint Lawrence Power Company)
- Québec Téléphone
- Compagnie de téléphone du golfe Saint-Laurent
- Compagnie de téléphone de Bonaventure et de Gaspé ltée
- Central Public Service Corporation
- CJBR radio, Rimouski,
- CJEM radio, New Brunswick
- CJBR-TV, Rimouski
- Compagnie de transport du Bas-Saint-Laurent
- Chemin de fer Matane et du Golfe (Matane and Gulf Railway)
- Compagnie du Progrès du Golfe
- Société d'administration et de fiducie

Corporate positions (1947–1962)

- Vice-president and chairman of the board of the Provincial Bank of Canada, then
- President of the executive committee of the Provincial Bank of Canada
- Director of the Central Mortgage Bank of Canada
- Director of
  - The Alliance, mutual life insurance company
  - Les Prévoyants du Canada
  - Dominion Steel and Coal Corporation
  - Texaco Canada
  - Canada Wire and Cable
  - Hawker Siddeley Canada
  - General Trust of Canada
- Chairman of the Board of Directors of Rimouski inc.

Public positions

- Director of the Office of Communications for the Defense of the Country
- Coordinator of the Reconstruction Committee in Ottawa
- Director of the Central Mortgage Bank (1939–1942)
- President of the Economic Orientation Council of Quebec (1939–1945)
- Legislative Counselor of the Gulf division (14 January 1942 – 31 December 1968) Supported the Liberal Party
- Founder and vice-president of the Rimouski Technical and Marine School.
- Participated in the founding of the Rimouski School of Business.
- President of the Rimouski Chamber of Commerce
- Honorary President of the Jean-Brillant Branch.

Honors and memberships

- Honorary member of the Canadian Red Cross
- Honorary Colonel of Les Fusiliers du St-Laurent in 1951.
- Member of Garrison Club, Mount Stephen Club, Newcomen Society of England and Montreal Club.
- Commander of the Order of the British Empire in 1944
- Commander of the Order of St. Gregory the Great in 1949.
- Knight of the Order of Malta in Canada in 1954.
- Decorated by the Canadian Armed Forces in 1955.
- Honorary Bachelor of Commerce from St. Joseph's College, New Brunswick (1939)
- Honorary doctorates in
  - Law from St. Joseph's College (1942),
  - Commerce from the Université de Montréal (1943)
  - Social sciences from Saint-Louis College, New Brunswick (1955)
  - Social sciences from the Université de Moncton, New Brunswick (1967)

== Sources ==
- Castonguay, Denis (2002), Portrait d'un bâtisseur: Jules-A. Brillant (in French), Radio Canada
- Jules-André BRILLANT (in French), Assemblée nationale du Québec
- La centrale hydroélectrique de la rivière Mitis (in French), Musée virtuel du Canada
- Voisine, Nine (June 2009), "Jules-A. Brillant (1888-1973)" (PDF), L.Estuaire (in French) (69)
