= Sayabec station =

Railway station in Quebec, Canada

Coordinates: 48°33′57″N 67°41′18″W

Sayabec
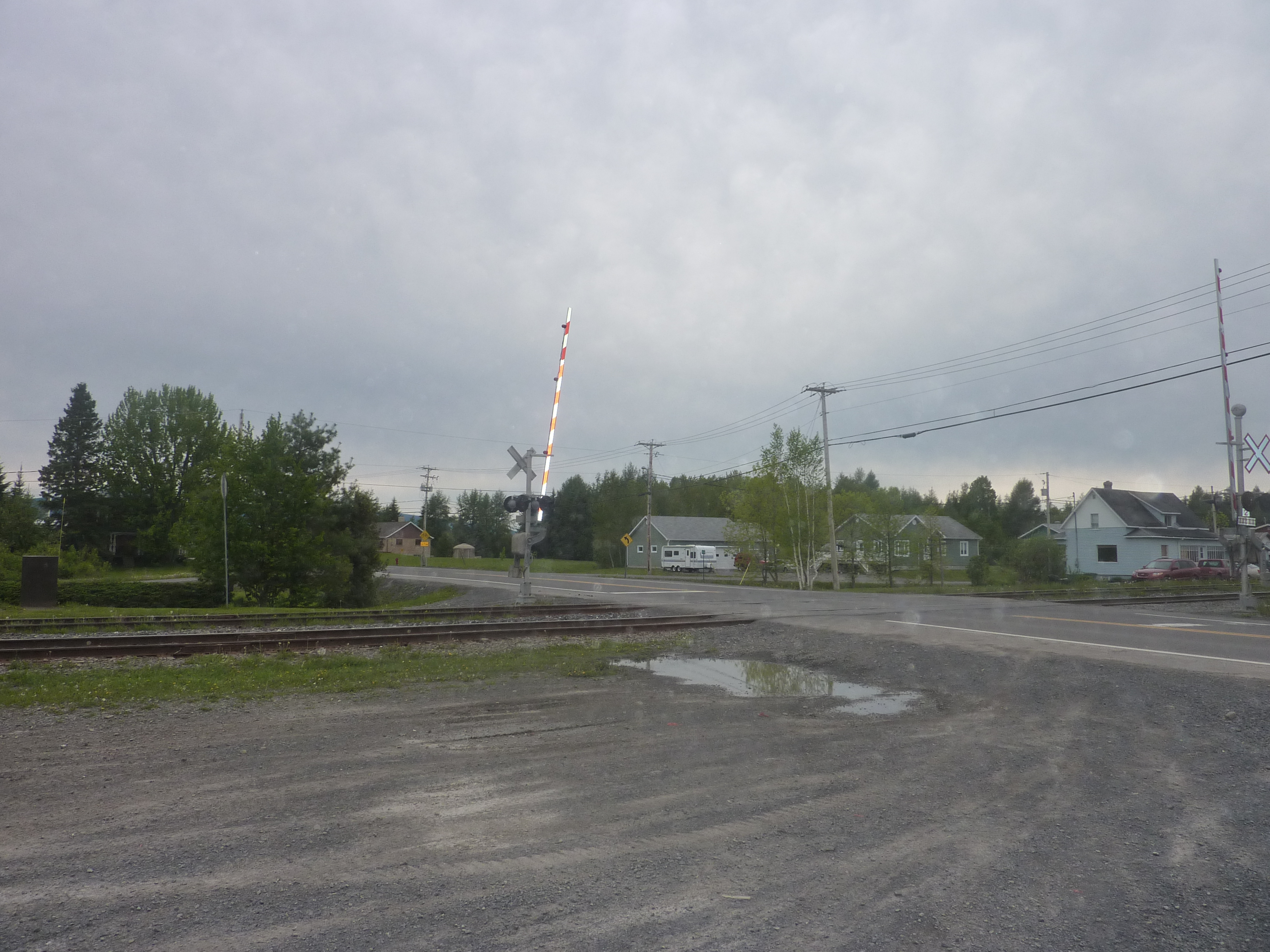

General information
- Location: 11 Route 132 Ouest; Sayabec, QC, Canada

Construction
- Structure type: Sign post
- Parking: Yes

Services
Preceding station	Via Rail	Following station
Mont-Joli toward Montreal	Ocean	Amqui toward Halifax
Former services
Preceding station	Via Rail	Following station
Mont-Joli toward Montreal	Montreal–Gaspé (Suspended 2013-2027)	Amqui toward Gaspé
Preceding station	Canadian National Railway	Following station
Saucier toward Montreal	Montreal – Moncton	Val Brillant toward Moncton
Location

Sayabec station is a Via Rail station in Sayabec, Quebec, Canada. Located on Rue Boulay (Route 132), it is a flag stop with no ticket service. Sayabec is served by Via Rail's Ocean; the Montreal – Gaspé train was suspended in 2013. Both trains share the same rail line between Montreal and Matapédia.

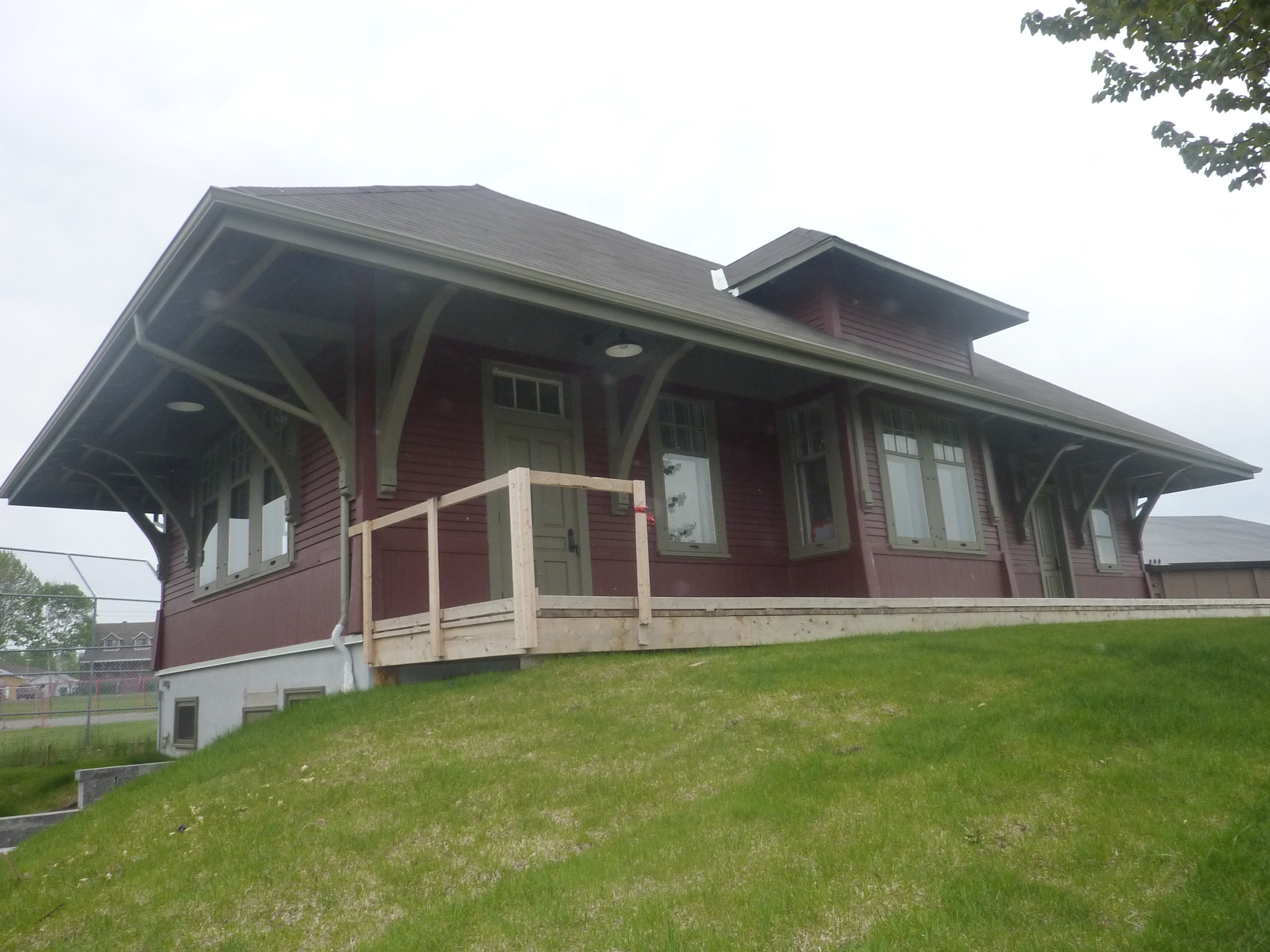
The old train station in 2009, relocated in a park in Sayabec, Quebec

The old building of the Canadian National Railway station is a designated Heritage Railway Station. It has been renovated and relocated from its original location to a park in Sayabec. It now serves as a meeting hall and provides touristic information.
