= Causapscal station =

Railway station in Quebec, Canada

Causapscal

General information
- Location: 142 Rue St-Jacques Sud; Causapscal, QC; Canada
- Coordinates: 48.3496°N 67.2269°W
- Owner: Via Rail

Construction
- Structure type: Sign post
- Parking: yes

Services
Preceding station	Via Rail	Following station
Amqui toward Montreal	Ocean	Matapédia toward Halifax
Former services
Preceding station	Via Rail	Following station
Amqui toward Montreal	Montreal–Gaspé (Suspended 2013-2027)	Matapédia toward Gaspé
Preceding station	Canadian National Railway	Following station
Lac au Saumon toward Montreal	Montreal – Moncton	Heppel toward Moncton
Location

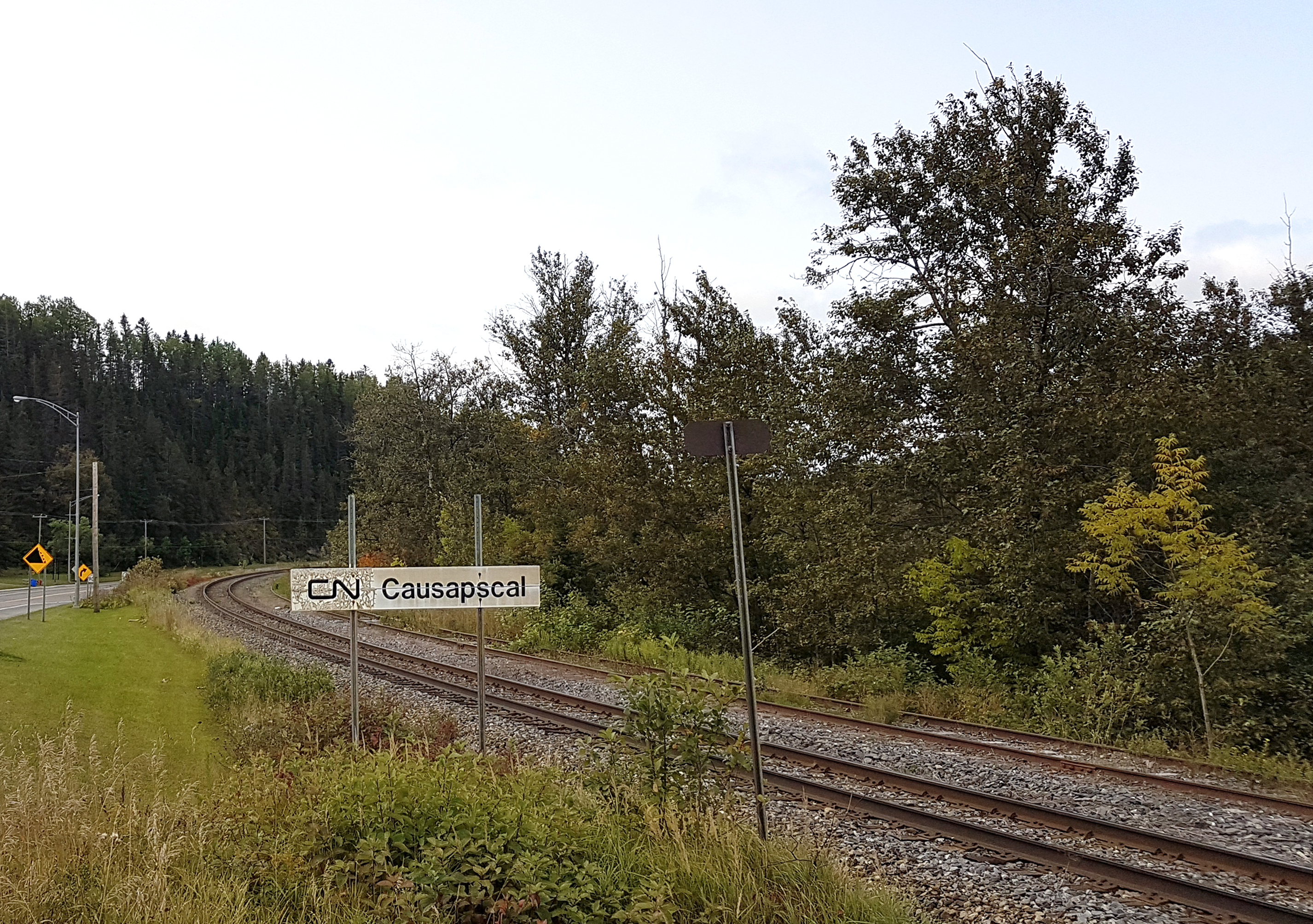

Causapscal station is a Via Rail station in Causapscal, Quebec, Canada. It is located at 142 Rue St-Jacques Sud near the end of Rue Cartier, and is a flag stop with no ticket sales. Causapscal is served by Via Rail's Ocean; the Montreal – Gaspé train has been out of service since 2013. Both trains shared the same rail line between Montreal and Matapédia.
