= Saint-Jean-Baptiste, Mont-Joli, Quebec =

Saint-Jean-Baptiste (French pronunciation: [sɛ̃ ʒɑ̃ batist]) was a former municipality in La Mitis Regional County Municipality in the Bas-Saint-Laurent region of Quebec.

It ceased to exist on June 13, 2001 when it merged with Mont-Joli, Quebec.
