= Quebec Cultural Heritage Directory =

The Quebec Cultural Heritage Directory (French: Répertoire du patrimoine culturel du Québec) is an online cultural heritage knowledge dissemination tool for the province of Quebec. The directory is maintained by the province's Ministry of Culture and Communications.

The Cultural Heritage Directory encompasses the heritage properties, items, and elements (buildings/structures (immovable objects), movable objects, people, and events) listed on the Québec Cultural Heritage Registry (French: Registre du patrimoine culturel du Québec), as well as detailed information about heritage aspects which have been inventoried by the Ministry of Culture and Communications or by its partner organizations.

These are updated forms and roles of both the Directory (Répertoire) and the Registry (Registre) that were created under the authority of the Cultural Heritage Act (French: la Loi sur le patrimoine culturel), passed into law on October 19, 2011, and that went into legal effect a year later, on October 19, 2012. This act replaced the Cultural Property Act (French: la Loi sur les biens culturels) of 1972.

== History ==
=== Cultural Property Act of 1972 ===
The registry under this previous act contained buildings and structures, as well as smaller objects such as documents, artifacts, and works of art. The objective of the Répertoire was to "identify, preserve, and make known the heritage of all regions of Quebec". Those properties which were protected under the Cultural Property Act of 1972 (French: la Loi sur les biens culturels) were included on the Register of Cultural Property (French: Registre des biens culturels). Under the 1972 law, the Répertoire included the Registre, which contained information about natural and historic districts, property protected by municipalities, commemorative plaques, the components of buildings or sites protected, as well as property in the inventory. A listing on the Répertoire did not itself give a site any legal protection. In 2010, there were 761 properties protected under the Cultural Property Act of 1972, by the provincial government, and approximately 60,000 properties which had been protected under the law by municipal governments.

== See also ==
- List of National Historic Sites of Canada in Quebec
- Maison Joseph-Gauvreau
