= Maison Joseph-Gauvreau =

Historical building in Rimouski, Quebec

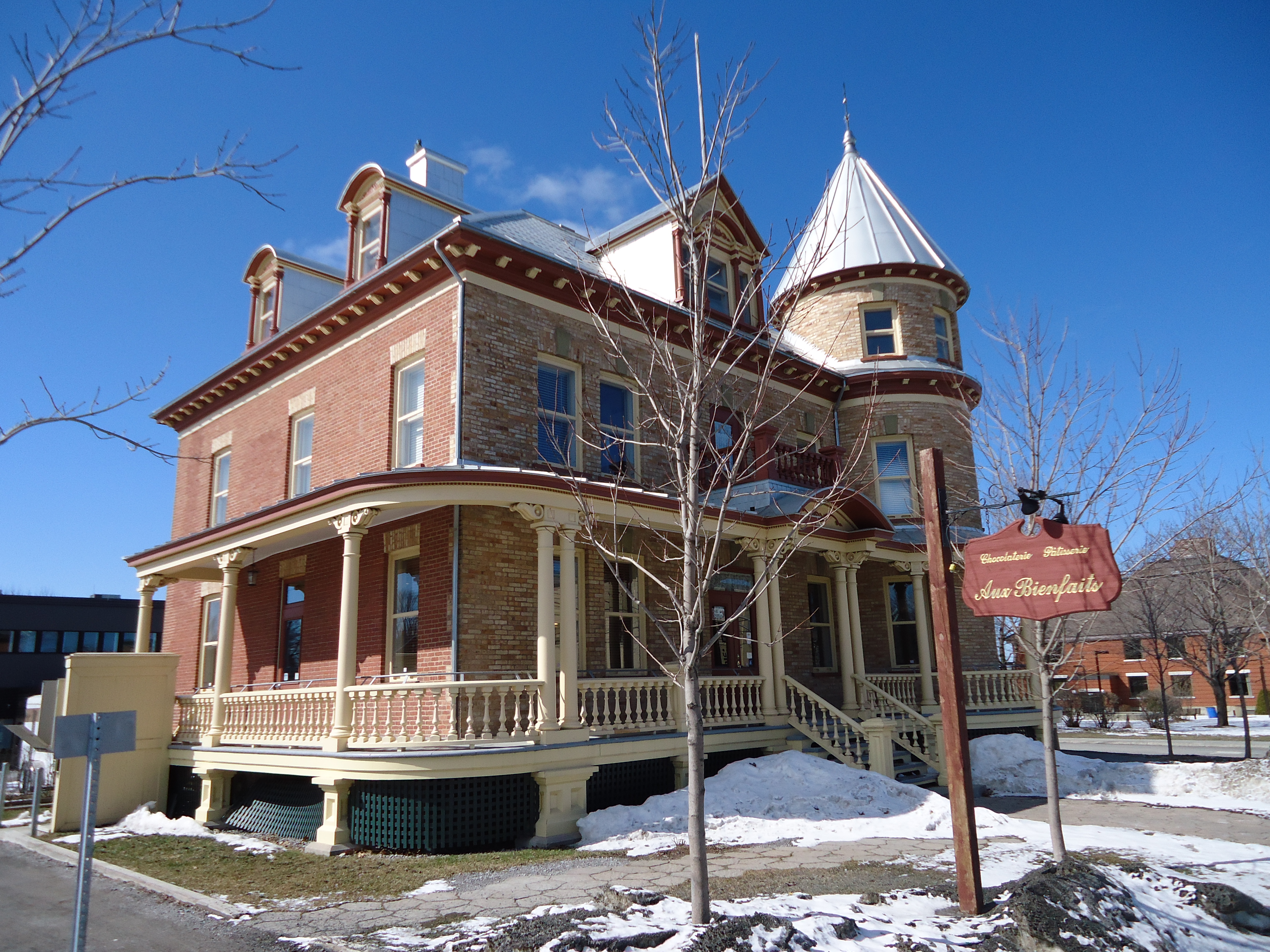

General information
- Type: House
- Architectural style: Queen Anne style architecture, Eclecticism in architecture
- Location: 1, Évêché Ouest Street, Rimouski, Quebec, Canada
- Coordinates: 48°26′55″N 68°31′26″W
- Year built: 1906–1907
- Owner: Joseph Gauvreau, Jules-André Brillant

Design and construction
- Awards: Classified as "Heritage Building" (1985)

Maison Joseph-Gauvreau is a heritage building located in Rimouski, in the Bas-Saint-Laurent region of Quebec. Constructed in 1906 and 1907 for Dr. Joseph Gauvreau, this eclectic-style bourgeois home served as his principal residence, as well as housing his medical practice and hydrotherapy clinic, whose fame spread throughout Quebec. Gauvreau was also one of the pioneers of hygiene and preventive medicine in Quebec. The amputation of one of his arms in 1909 forced him to give up medical practice and relocate to Montreal.

Between 1930 and 1947, the house was owned by Jules-André Brillant, Québec-Téléphone founder, and Québec legislative councilor. It was one of the few houses spared by the Rimouski fire of 1950. The following year, it was moved by Société immobilière Irving to make way for a filling station.

In 1984, faced with the threat of demolition to expand the filling station, a group of citizens mobilized to have the house classified as a Heritage Building in 1985. The house was sold to Réjean Frenette in 1998, who moved it back to its original location and restored it to its early 20th-century appearance. Since 2007, it has housed a chocolate factory and three meeting rooms.

== Location ==
Maison Joseph-Gauvreau is located at 1, rue de l'Évêché Ouest, at the intersection of rue de la Cathédrale, in Rimouski. It is located in the institutional heart of the city.

== History ==
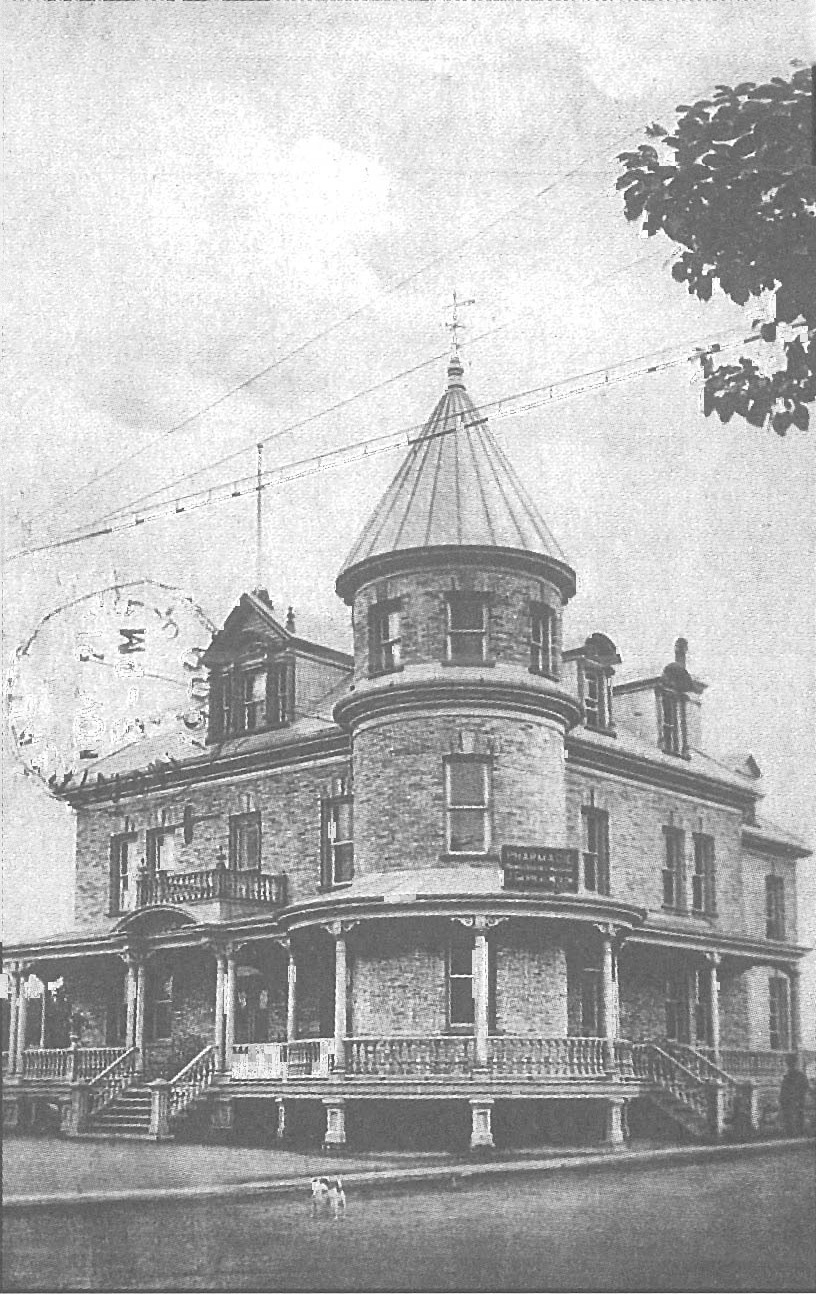
Postcard of Pharmacie Les Bains in 1909, taken by J. O. Vallée.

After completing his medical studies at Université Laval in 1896, Dr. Joseph Gauvreau returned to the Rimouski area and settled in Le Bic in 1897. After his brother, also a physician, died in 1898, he moved his medical practice to Rimouski. In 1900, he was injured in a car accident, but it seemed to have no effect other than to leave him with a few protuberances in his arm.

In May 1906, Dr. Joseph Gauvreau rented land at the intersection of rue de l'Évêché and rue de la Cathédrale, a brand-new crossroads in the city, from the Roman Catholic Archdiocese of Rimouski. The contract, signed by Mgr. André-Albert Blais for an initial five-year term, stipulates that the building to be constructed there must be worth at least $2,500 dollars, the value of the land. Dr. Gauvreau quickly had the house built in 1906–1907, a building of "impressive dimensions" reflecting the architectural tastes of the time, which served as his medical clinic and residence. On the first floor, he set up his hydrotherapy clinic, known as "Pharmacie Les Bains", which quickly became renowned throughout Quebec.

In 1907, the protuberances on his arm became infected, resulting in amputation. He continued his career for some time in Rimouski, holding administrative positions with the Collège des médecins du Québec. In 1909, he was appointed Provincial Registrar of the organization and moved to Montreal. Dr. Gauvreau then rented out his sumptuous home.

Around the same time, Louis Lenghan, owner of the Hotel Lenghan, sold his establishment to Antoine Fortin, who changed the name to Château Tracy. Louis Lenghan, in turn, rented Dr. Gauvreau's residence and equipped it with rooms and hotel services. He named his establishment Hôtel St-Louis. Thus began the story of this prestigious Rimouski hotel in 1914–1915. By 1915, Dr. Gauvreau had placed another advertisement for the rental of his house. It seems that it was rented to Dr. L.-J. Moreault until 1918.

And in 1930, Jules-André Brillant, legislative councilor and founder of Québec-Téléphone bought the house. In 1947, he sold it to Lorenzo Ouellet, a hardware merchant who set up shop on the land and leased the house to a company. This property was not affected by the fire that destroyed two-thirds of the city in 1950. It also escaped demolition for the first time when the Irving Real Estate Company bought the land for a gas station and had it moved to the back of the lot in 1951. It lost its side annex and gallery, while the main door was replaced by a large window.

In July 1984, the Irving Real Estate Company announced its intention to demolish the house and build a convenience store on the site. A demolition permit was obtained, but a newly formed citizens' group, the "Comité du patrimoine", took steps to have the building classified as a "historic monument". The Quebec government responded favorably to this request, issuing a "notice of intent to classify" within a few days. Negotiations then began between the Comité du Patrimoine, now the "Société Joseph-Gauvreau", government officials, and the owner, with the aim of definitively classifying the house and giving it a new purpose.

Eventually, on May 10, 1985, the government classified the house as a Heritage Building, recognizing it as one of the few examples of Victorian eclecticism in Eastern Quebec, the diversity of its uses as a residence and as a business, and the notoriety of two of its occupants (Joseph Gauvreau and Jules-André Brillant). For the next five years, Irving ignored the classification until a letter sent to the company's president, Kenneth Colin Irving, resolved the situation. The City of Rimouski offered to move the house near the railway station and restore it for office use. In 1993, the Irving company signed a memorandum of understanding to defray the costs of the move. However, part of Rimouski's municipal council opposed the project, deeming it too costly, and the relocation never went ahead.

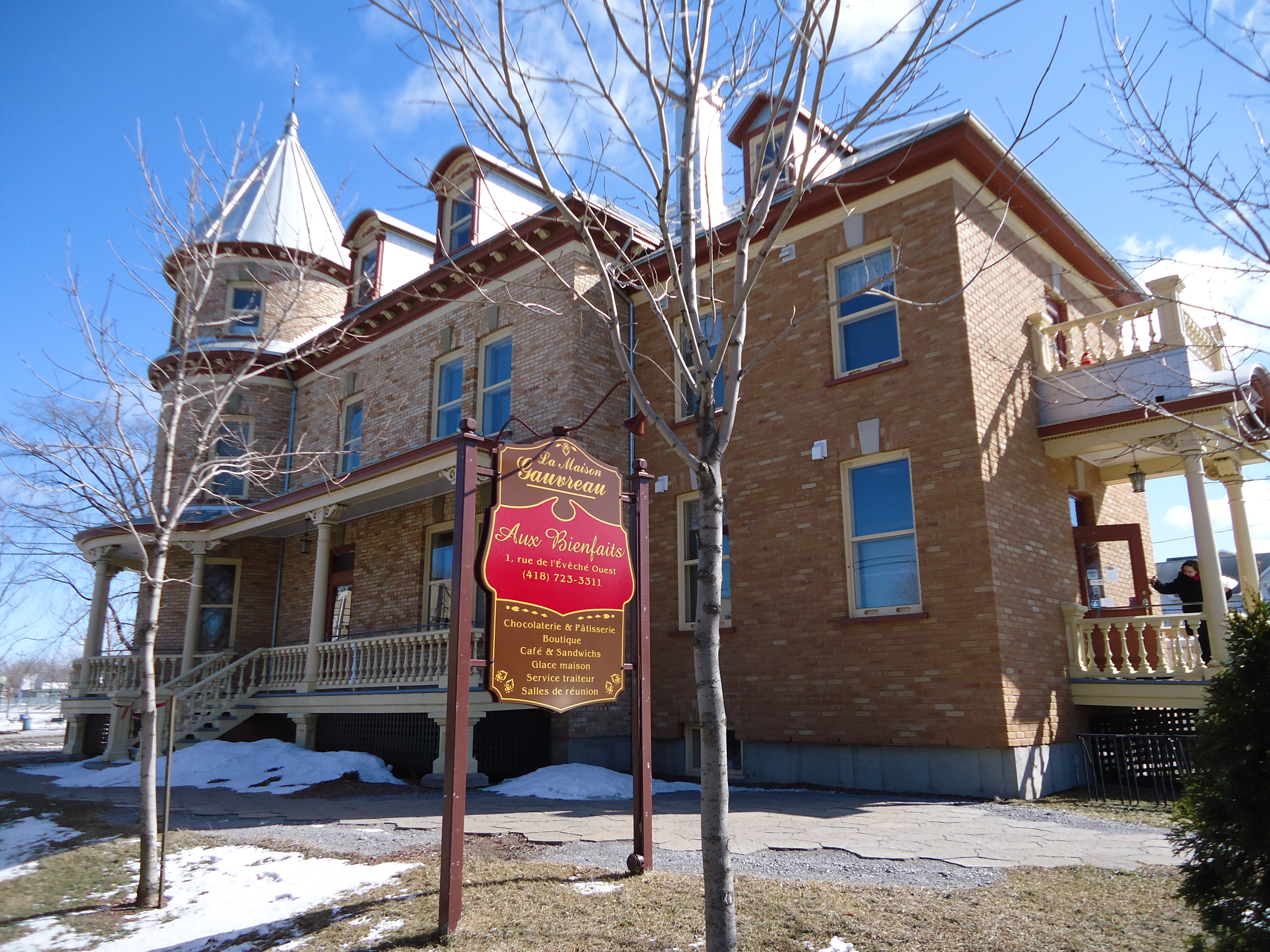
Maison Gauvreau and commercial signage.

The house was bought in 1998 by Réjean Frenette, a Rimouski resident, who wished to restore it, and it underwent urgent renovation work. He also had the garage, built in 1951, demolished and, in 1999, the house was moved back to its original location "at the intersection of Rimouski's most prestigious streets", thus regaining "its former importance in the urban fabric". The C$180,000 project was made possible thanks to the financial support of the City of Rimouski and the Quebec government, which recognized Réjean Frenette's conservation efforts.

From 2000 to 2007, the house was restored to its original state, and the annex demolished in 1951 was rebuilt, at a total cost of $600,000 CAD. Since 2007, it has housed the Aux bienfaits chocolate and pastry shop and, on the second floor, three meeting rooms for up to 140 people.

== Architecture ==
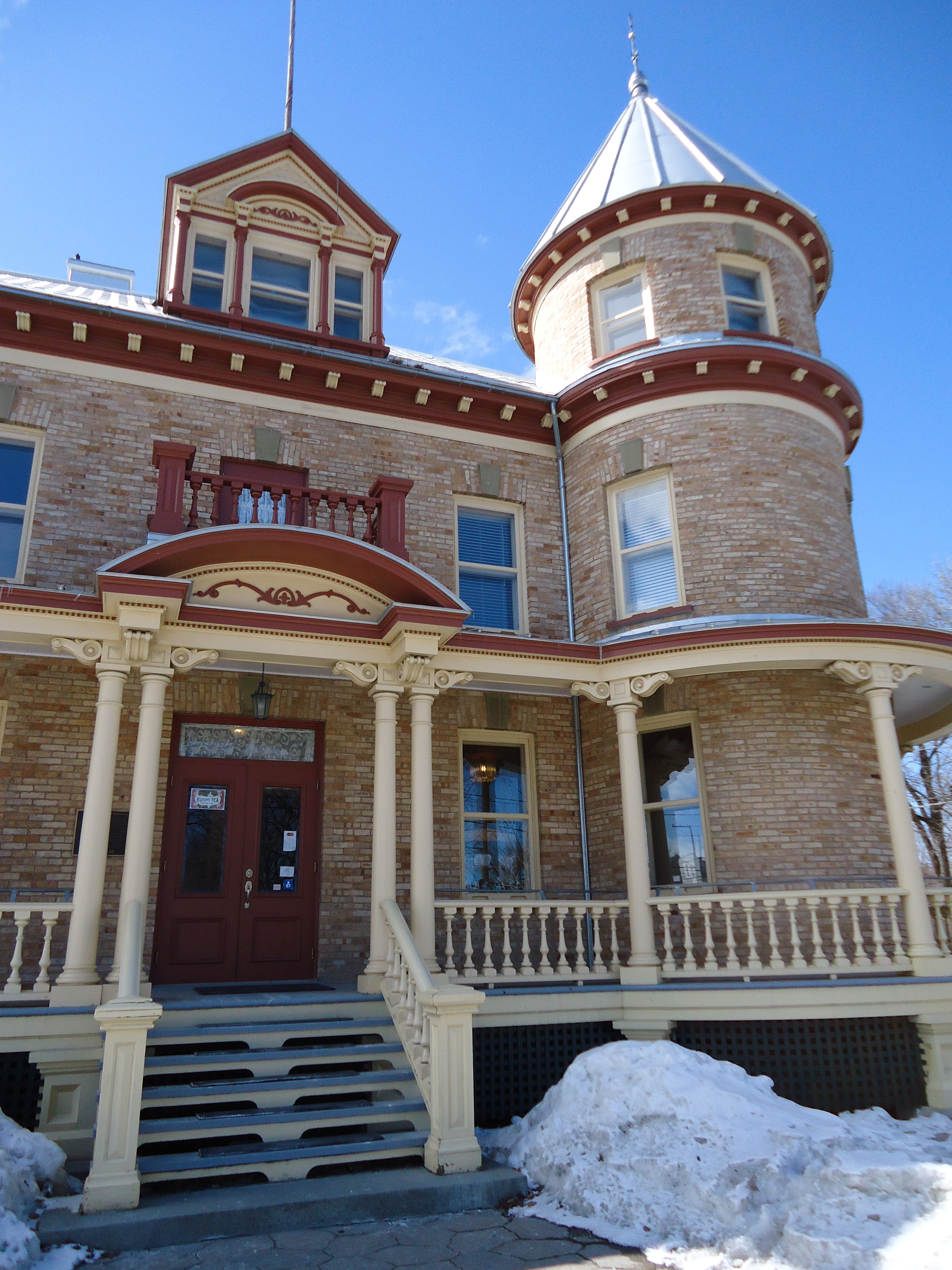
Façade of the house.

The Joseph-Gauvreau house is one of the few houses in the Rimouski region whose architecture borrows from Victorian eclecticism. It takes its form from the Queen Anne style and its ornamentation from Classicism. This three-story house has a square floor layout with a corner turret. The exterior cladding consists of Scottish brick with keystone and quoin ornamentation on the doors and projecting keystones on the windows. A large gallery extends along three sides of the house.

The hipped, four-sided roof is covered with Canadian-style sheet metal, with a conical turret at the northeast corner. The main dormer features a Venetian window with columns and ornamentation, topped by a circular pediment. The other dormers have arched roofs, cornices with small decorative brackets, and molded friezes. The eaves are decorated with voluted modillions. The sash windows are tall and narrow.

Inside, the walls are paneled with wood battens on the upper floor and attic. Moldings are composed of architraves and baseboards. A commemorative plaque from the Ministère de la Culture et des Communications was affixed in 2008.

== Appendix ==
=== Bibliography ===
- Amélie Brière and Catherine Gélinas, Les Promenades historiques de Rimouski : guide d'excursion et d'interprétation, Rimouski, Société rimouskoise du patrimoine, 2007, 108 p. (OCLC 282481433).
- Rémi Lavoie, "La Mer au cœur de la Pharmacie Les Bains: mystères de la maison Gauvreau", Revue d'histoire du Bas-Saint-Laurent, vol. 25, no 2, 2002, p. 25–28 (ISSN 0319-0730, read online archive [PDF]).
- Antonio Lechasseur, "Histoire d'une belle rimouskoise : La maison Gauvreau", Revue d'histoire du Bas-Saint-Laurent, vol. 10, no 1, 1984, p. 7–13 (ISSN 0319-0730, read online archive).
- Michel L. St-Pierre, "La Maison Gauvreau : une sauvegarde difficile", Revue d'histoire du Bas-Saint-Laurent, vol. 17, no 2, 1994, p. 44 (ISSN 0319-0730, read online archive [PDF]).

=== Related articles ===
- List of historic places in Bas-Saint-Laurent

=== External links ===
- Ministère de la Culture et des Communications, "Maison Joseph-Gauvreau" archive, on Répertoire du patrimoine culturel du Québec.
