= Mont-Joli =

- City
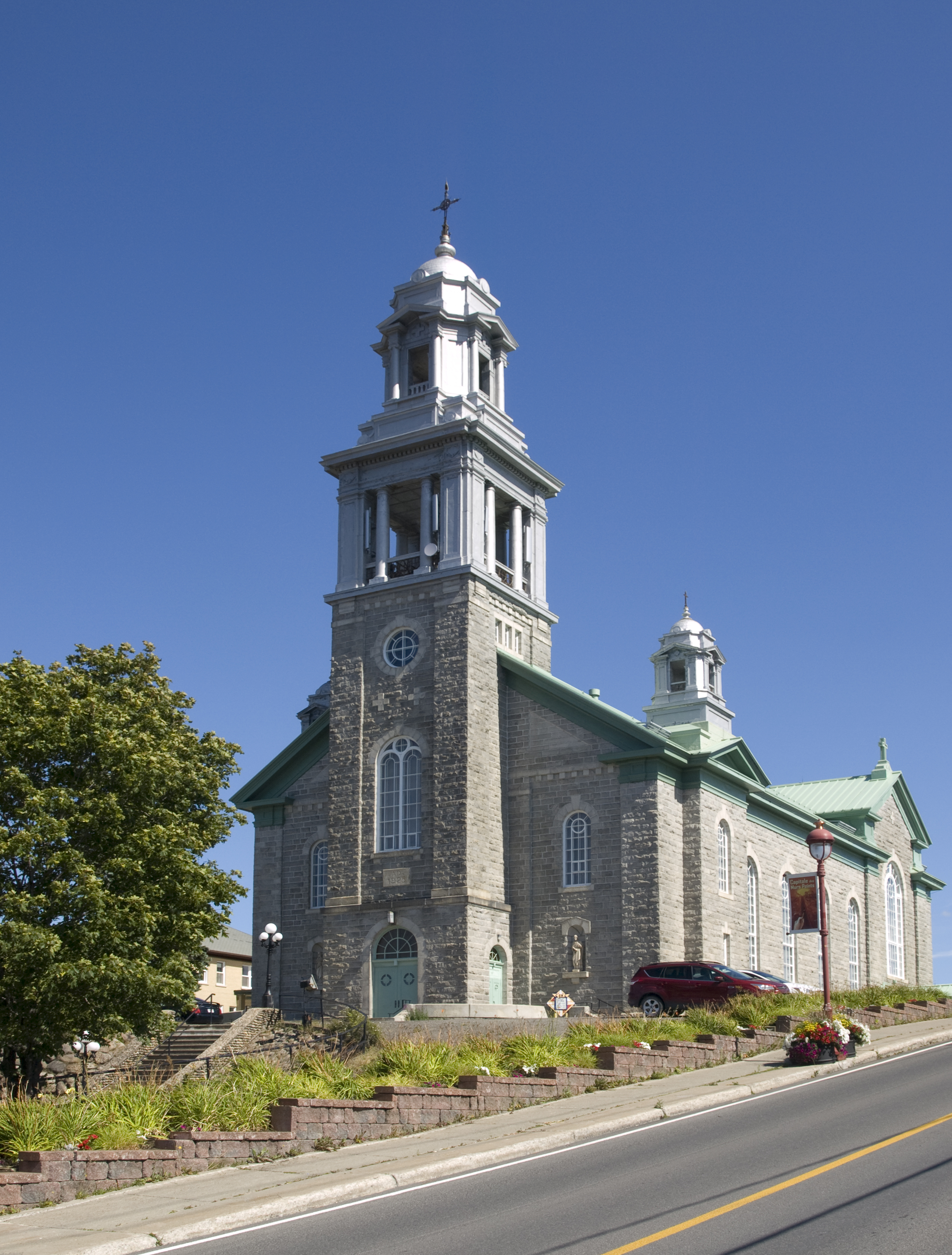
- Notre-Dame-de-Lourdes de Mont-Joli Church

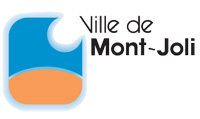
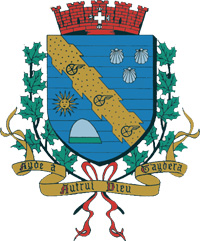
- Flag Coat of arms

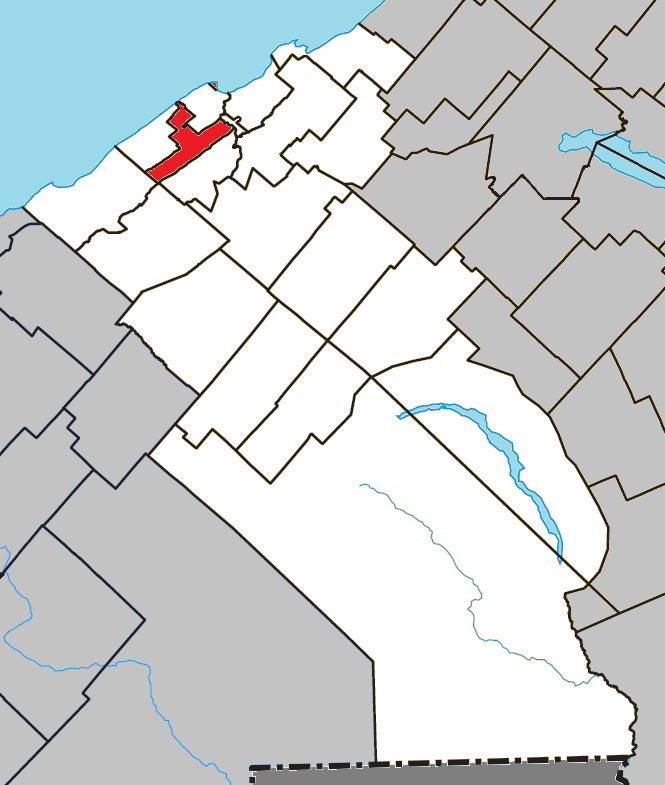
- Location within La Mitis RCM

- Location in eastern Quebec
- Coordinates: 48.58°N 68.18°W
- Country: Canada
- Province: Quebec
- Region: Bas-Saint-Laurent
- RCM: La Mitis
- Constituted: 13 June 2001

Government
  - Mayor: Martin Soucy
  - Federal riding: Rimouski-Neigette—Mitis—Matapédia—Les Basques
  - Prov. riding: Matane-Matapédia-Mitis

Area
  - Total: 24.30 km^{2} (9.38 sq mi)
  - Land: 24.24 km^{2} (9.36 sq mi)
- Elevation: 75 m (246 ft)

Population (2021)
  - Total: 6,384
  - Density: 263.3/km^{2} (682/sq mi)
  - Pop 2016–2021: ▲1.6%
  - Dwellings: 3,173
- Time zone: UTC−5 (EST)
  - Summer (DST): UTC−4 (EDT)
- Postal code(s): G5H 1W8
- Area codes: 418 and 581
- Highways A-20: R-132
- Website: www.ville.mont-joli.qc.ca

Mont-Joli (French: [mɔ̃ ʒɔli]) is a city in the La Mitis Regional County Municipality within the Bas-Saint-Laurent region of Quebec, Canada. It is the county seat. The city is located east of Rimouski near the south shore of the Saint Lawrence River.

== History ==
In 1867, the main condition for New Brunswick and Nova-Scotia entering into the Canadian Confederation was, to be linked to the rest of the country by the railway. In 1868, work began on the Intercolonial Railway and the authorities decided to have the railway turn at Saint-Octave-de-Métis in Gaspésie. However, this village, because of its rugged landscape, was not suitable to receive the train station and maintenance shops. The engineers turned to the higher 2nd farming rank of Sainte-Flavie, and the train station was named Sainte-Flavie-Station. In 1880, Sainte-Flavie-Station became separate and was named Mont-Joli, the name which the first settlers had used to describe the area.

On 13 June 2001, the neighbouring municipality of Saint-Jean-Baptiste (not to be confused with a different Saint-Jean-Baptiste in the Montérégie region) merged with Mont-Joli.

== Geography ==
=== Climate ===
Mont-Joli has a humid continental climate (Köppen Dfb). The average annual temperature in Mont-Joli is 3.9 °C (39.0 °F). The average annual precipitation is 931.7 mm (36.68 in) with October as the wettest month. The temperatures are highest on average in July, at around 17.9 °C (64.2 °F), and lowest in January, at around −11.3 °C (11.7 °F). The highest temperature ever recorded in Mont-Joli was 35.9 °C (96.6 °F) on 4 July 1983; the coldest temperature ever recorded was −34.7 °C (−30.5 °F) on 3 January 2014.

Climate data for Mont-Joli Climate ID: 7055121; coordinates 48°36′32″N 68°12′27″W; elevation: 52.4 m (172 ft); WMO ID: 71718; 1991–2020 normals, extremes 1943–present
Month	Jan	Feb	Mar	Apr	May	Jun	Jul	Aug	Sep	Oct	Nov	Dec	Year
Record high humidex	13.7	11.3	25.7	30.5	37.8	42.7	41.6	41.3	39.3	31.0	25.2	18.7	42.7
Record high °C (°F)	13.3 (55.9)	12.4 (54.3)	23.3 (73.9)	29.1 (84.4)	33.7 (92.7)	35.1 (95.2)	35.9 (96.6)	35.1 (95.2)	32.6 (90.7)	27.5 (81.5)	23.3 (73.9)	16.7 (62.1)	35.9 (96.6)
Mean maximum °C (°F)	5.3 (41.5)	3.8 (38.8)	8.6 (47.5)	17.0 (62.6)	25.0 (77.0)	29.3 (84.7)	29.9 (85.8)	29.2 (84.6)	26.3 (79.3)	20.6 (69.1)	15.5 (59.9)	7.9 (46.2)	31.4 (88.5)
Mean daily maximum °C (°F)	−7.2 (19.0)	−6.2 (20.8)	−0.9 (30.4)	6.0 (42.8)	14.0 (57.2)	19.8 (67.6)	22.9 (73.2)	22.1 (71.8)	17.3 (63.1)	9.7 (49.5)	3.5 (38.3)	−2.9 (26.8)	8.2 (46.8)
Daily mean °C (°F)	−11.3 (11.7)	−10.3 (13.5)	−4.9 (23.2)	2.0 (35.6)	9.0 (48.2)	14.6 (58.3)	17.9 (64.2)	17.1 (62.8)	12.7 (54.9)	6.1 (43.0)	0.4 (32.7)	−6.2 (20.8)	3.9 (39.0)
Mean daily minimum °C (°F)	−15.4 (4.3)	−14.4 (6.1)	−8.9 (16.0)	−1.9 (28.6)	3.9 (39.0)	9.2 (48.6)	12.9 (55.2)	12.1 (53.8)	8.0 (46.4)	2.5 (36.5)	−2.8 (27.0)	−9.6 (14.7)	−0.4 (31.3)
Mean minimum °C (°F)	−25.5 (−13.9)	−23.8 (−10.8)	−19.5 (−3.1)	−9.5 (14.9)	−1.9 (28.6)	3.1 (37.6)	7.8 (46.0)	6.9 (44.4)	1.2 (34.2)	−4.0 (24.8)	−10.9 (12.4)	−19.5 (−3.1)	−26.7 (−16.1)
Record low °C (°F)	−34.7 (−30.5)	−31.1 (−24.0)	−29.4 (−20.9)	−19.9 (−3.8)	−12.2 (10.0)	−1.1 (30.0)	0.8 (33.4)	1.8 (35.2)	−5.0 (23.0)	−8.4 (16.9)	−18.3 (−0.9)	−30.6 (−23.1)	−34.7 (−30.5)
Record low wind chill	−51.3	−48.3	−39.4	−29.0	−17.8	−3.3	0.0	0.0	−6.7	−13.1	−29.6	−43.5	−51.3
Average precipitation mm (inches)	74.0 (2.91)	65.0 (2.56)	70.0 (2.76)	64.0 (2.52)	75.5 (2.97)	76.1 (3.00)	92.5 (3.64)	77.5 (3.05)	85.7 (3.37)	97.0 (3.82)	73.7 (2.90)	80.6 (3.17)	931.7 (36.68)
Average rainfall mm (inches)	10.4 (0.41)	4.6 (0.18)	13.4 (0.53)	42.3 (1.67)	73.7 (2.90)	76.1 (3.00)	92.5 (3.64)	77.5 (3.05)	85.7 (3.37)	88.1 (3.47)	44.2 (1.74)	21.4 (0.84)	630.0 (24.80)
Average snowfall cm (inches)	71.6 (28.2)	66.2 (26.1)	60.3 (23.7)	21.8 (8.6)	1.8 (0.7)	0.0 (0.0)	0.0 (0.0)	0.0 (0.0)	0.0 (0.0)	3.9 (1.5)	30.6 (12.0)	66.8 (26.3)	323.0 (127.2)
Average precipitation days (≥ 0.2 mm)	20.7	16.5	14.3	12.4	13.5	13.0	14.0	13.0	12.3	14.9	14.9	18.4	178.0
Average rainy days (≥ 0.2 mm)	2.5	1.5	4.0	9.1	13.4	13.0	14.0	13.0	12.3	14.1	8.9	3.9	109.6
Average snowy days (≥ 0.2 cm)	19.9	15.9	12.0	5.6	0.48	0.0	0.0	0.0	0.0	1.3	8.4	16.9	80.4
Average relative humidity (%) (at 1500 LST)	71.8	70.1	68.2	64.0	59.3	61.2	64.3	63.6	65.6	70.6	72.9	74.8	67.2
Average dew point °C (°F)	−14.9 (5.2)	−14.0 (6.8)	−9.2 (15.4)	−3.2 (26.2)	3.2 (37.8)	9.0 (48.2)	12.8 (55.0)	12.3 (54.1)	8.3 (46.9)	2.2 (36.0)	−3.7 (25.3)	−9.7 (14.5)	−0.5 (31.1)
Source 1: Environment Canada
Source 2: weatherstats.ca (for dewpoint and monthly&yearly average absolute maximum&minimum temperature)

== Demographics ==
Historical Census Data - Mont-Joli, Quebec
Year	Pop.	±%
1881	710	—
1891	742	+4.5%
1901	822	+10.8%
1911	2,141	+160.5%
1921	2,799	+30.7%
1931	3,143	+12.3%
1941	3,533	+12.4%
1951	4,938	+39.8%
1956	6,179	+25.1%
1961	6,178	−0.0%
1966	6,366	+3.0%
1971	6,698	+5.2%
1976	6,508	−2.8%
1981	6,713	+3.1%
1986	6,670	−0.6%
1991	6,265	−6.1%
1996	6,267	+0.0%
2001	5,886	−6.1%
2006	6,568	+11.6%
2011	6,665	+1.5%
2016	6,281	−5.8%
2021	6,384	+1.6%

In the 2021 Census of Population conducted by Statistics Canada, Mont-Joli had a population of 6,384 living in 3,034 of its 3,173 total private dwellings, an increase of 1.6% from its 2016 population of 6,281. With a land area of 24.24 km^{2} (9.36 sq mi), it had a population density of 263.4/km^{2} (682.1/sq mi) in 2021.

Canada census – Mont-Joli community profile

	2021	2016	2011
Population	6,384 (+1.6% from 2016)	6,281 (-5.8% from 2011)	6,665 (+1.5% from 2006)
Land area	24.24 km^{2} (9.36 sq mi)	24.20 km^{2} (9.34 sq mi)	24.25 km^{2} (9.36 sq mi)
Population density	263.3/km^{2} (682/sq mi)	259.5/km^{2} (672/sq mi)	272.6/km^{2} (706/sq mi)
Median age	52.8 (M: 50.4, F: 55.6)	51.3 (M: 49.9, F: 52.7)	49.8 (M: 48.0, F: 50.8)
Private dwellings	3,173 (total)	3,102 (total)	3,138 (total)
Median household income	$51,600	$43,568	$46,221

References: 2021 2016 2011

Canada Census Mother Tongue - Mont-Joli, Quebec
Census	Total	French			English			French & English			Other		
Year	Responses	Count	Trend	Pop %	Count	Trend	Pop %	Count	Trend	Pop %	Count	Trend	Pop %
2021	6,095	6,005	▼0.3%	98.5%	40	▲33.3%	0.7%	20	0.0%	0.3%	20	▲33.3%	0.3%
2016	6,085	6,025	▼4.2%	99.0%	30	▼25.0%	0.5%	20	▼33.3%	0.3%	15	▼25.0%	0.2%
2011	6,385	6,290	▲2.2%	98.5%	40	▼11.1%	0.6%	30	0.0%	0.5%	20	▼50.0%	0.3%
2006	6,265	6,155	▲12.5%	98.2%	45	▲80.0%	0.7%	30	▲ n/a%	0.5%	40	▲ n/a%	0.6%
2001	5,510	5,470	n/a	99.3%	25	n/a	0.5%	0	n/a	0.0%	0	n/a	0.0%

== Infrastructure ==
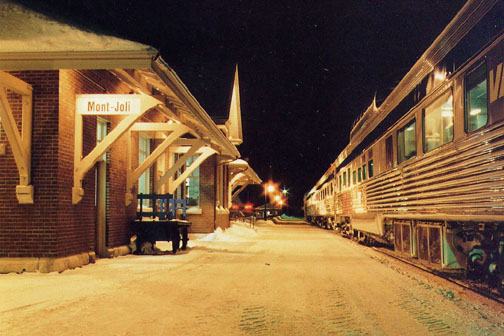
Via Rail station

Mont-Joli is the easternmost end of Autoroute 20, whose segment connects with the city of Rimouski. Route 132 runs through the centre of Mont-Joli as part of a loop that circumnavigates the Gaspé Peninsula; it is about 3 km (2 mi) southeast of Sainte-Flavie, where Route 132 intersects with itself.

Mont-Joli Airport is the only airport with scheduled service in the Bas-Saint-Laurent region. Mont-Joli is also served by the Mont-Joli railway station.

== Notable people ==
- Gaétan D'Amours: Mr. Québec 1960, Mr. Canada 1961, Mr. America 1961, Mr. Universe 1967 (5th place)
- Danielle Doyer: politician
- Donald Dufresne: ex-NHL hockey player and assistant manager to the Rimouski Océanic
- René Dupéré: composer for Cirque du Soleil
- Pierre Labrie: writer
- Lana St-Cyr: drag queen
- Maurice Lamontagne: economist and Canadian Senator
- Robert Piché: airline pilot in Mont-Joli, involved in the 236 Air Transat incident
- Gervais Rioux: Olympic cyclist (Seoul, 1988)

== See also ==
- List of cities in Quebec
- Rivière-Blanche station
