= Boyer South River =

River in Chaudière-Appalaches, Quebec (Canada)

- Native name: Rivière Boyer Sud (French)

Location
- Country: Canada
- Province: Quebec
- Region: Chaudière-Appalaches
- Bellechasse Regional County Municipality et Desjardins Regional County Municipality: MRC

Physical characteristics
- Source: Agricultural streams
  - location: Honfleur
  - coordinates: 46.666837°N 70.883836°W
  - elevation: 194 metres (636 ft)
- Mouth: Boyer River
  - location: Saint-Charles-de-Bellechasse
  - coordinates: 46.7275°N 70.96445°W
  - elevation: 62 metres (203 ft)
- Length: 14.5 km (9.0 mi)

Basin features
- Progression: St. Lawrence River
- Tributaries
  - left: (upstream)

The Boyer South River (in French: rivière Boyer Sud) is a tributary of the Boyer River, which flows northeast and empties on the south shore of the St. Lawrence River. The South Boyer River crosses the municipalities of Honfleur, Saint-Gervais, Saint-Henri and Saint-Charles-de-Bellechasse, in the Bellechasse Regional County Municipality, in the administrative region of Chaudière-Appalaches, in Quebec, in Canada.

== Geography ==
The main neighboring watersheds of the South Boyer River are:

- north side: Boyer North River, Boyer River, rivière à la Scie, St. Lawrence River;
- east side: Boyer River, Leblond stream, Bras Saint-Michel, rivière du Moulin (Bras Saint-Michel);
- south side: Etchemin River, Boyer North River;
- west side: Etchemin River.

The Boyer Sud river has its source in an agricultural zone on the north side of the village of Honfleur, in the 3e rang East, between the third rang East road and the path "la Petite 3e".

From its source, the South Boyer River flows on 14.5 kilometres (9.0 mi), with a drop of 132 metres (433 ft), according to the following segments:

- 1.4 kilometres (0.87 mi) north into Honfleur, to the limit of Saint-Gervais;
- 1.7 kilometres (1.1 mi) north, up to chemin du 2e rang West;
- 2.4 kilometres (1.5 mi) west, then north-west, to chemin du 1er rang West;
- 2.5 kilometres (1.6 mi) westward, up to the limit of Saint-Gervais and Saint-Henri;
- 2.0 kilometres (1.2 mi) north, to Chemin de la Grande-Grillade;
- 2.9 kilometres (1.8 mi) northeasterly, up to Chemin Saint-Félix which forms the boundary between Saint-Henri and Saint-Charles-de-Bellechasse;
- 1.6 kilometres (0.99 mi) northeasterly, to its confluence with the Boyer North River, which constitutes the head of the Boyer River.

The confluence of the Boyer South river is located on the northwest side of rang Sud-Ouest road, in Saint-Charles-de-Bellechasse. This confluence is located at 5.6 kilometres (3.5 mi) west of the village of Saint-Gervais, 5.1 kilometres (3.2 mi) south of the village of Saint-Charles-de-Bellechasse and 8.6 kilometres (5.3 mi) east of the village of Saint-Henri.

== Toponymy ==
The toponym Rivière Boyer Sud was formalized on December 5, 1968, at the Commission de toponymie du Québec.

== See also ==
- List of rivers of Quebec
