= Boyer River North =

River in Chaudière-Appalaches, Quebec (Canada)

- Native name: Rivière Boyer Nord (French)

Location
- Country: Canada
- Province: Quebec
- Region: Chaudière-Appalaches
- Bellechasse et Desjardins: MRC

Physical characteristics
- Source: Agricultural streams
  - location: Saint-Anselme
  - coordinates: 46.62964°N 70.962365°W
  - elevation: 168 metres (551 ft)
- Mouth: Boyer River
  - location: Saint-Charles-de-Bellechasse
  - coordinates: 46.72778°N 70.96472°W
  - elevation: 63 metres (207 ft)
- Length: 17.5 km (10.9 mi)

Basin features
- Progression: St. Lawrence River
- Tributaries
  - left: (upstream) Ruisseau Labrie, ruisseau Vien-Dalzill, branche Félix Vallières, ruisseau Grillade, Fossé de la Plée

The rivière Boyer Nord (in English: Boyer North River) is a tributary of the northwest shore of the Boyer River, which flows northeast and empties on the south shore of the St. Lawrence River. The "Boyer North River" crosses the municipalities of Saint-Anselme, Saint-Henri and Bellechasse Regional County Municipality (MRC), in the administrative region of Chaudière-Appalaches, in Quebec, in Canada.

== Geography ==
The main neighboring watersheds of the North Boyer River are:

- north side: rivière à la Scie, St. Lawrence River;
- east side: Boyer River;
- south side: Boyer South River, Etchemin River;
- west side: Etchemin River.

The "Boyer Nord river" has its source on the east side of the Etchemin River, in the Sainte-Anne range, in the municipality of Saint-Anselme on the north side of the village.

From its source, the Boyer Nord River flows on 17.5 kilometres (10.9 mi), according to the following segments:

- 2.0 kilometres (1.2 mi) south-west, then north-west, passing between Cadrin and Bourassa streets, then behind the arena, on the north side of the village of Saint-Anselme, then crossing the chemin Saint-Marc;
- 1.9 kilometres (1.2 mi) northwesterly, along the northeast side of route 277, to rang de la Montagne road;
- 3.1 kilometres (1.9 mi) northward, up to the limit between the municipalities of Saint-Anselme and Saint-Henri;
- 1.2 kilometres (0.75 mi) north, to Rang de la Grande-Grillade;
- 3.7 kilometres (2.3 mi) north, winding up to Chemin Saint-Félix;
- 5.6 kilometres (3.5 mi) northeasterly, along the southeast side of route 218, up to its mouth.

The confluence of the "North Boyer River" is located on the northwest shore of the Boyer River, in Saint-Charles-de-Bellechasse. This confluence is located west of the village of Saint-Gervais, south of the village of Saint-Charles-de-Bellechasse and east of the village of Saint-Henri.

== Toponymy ==
The toponym "rivière Boyer Nord" was made official on December 5, 1968, at the Commission de toponymie du Québec.

== See also ==
- List of rivers of Quebec
