= Réal Lapierre =

Canadian politician and teacher (born 1944)

Réal Lapierre (born August 5, 1944) is a Canadian politician and former École Pointe-Lévy geography teacher.

Born in Saint-Charles-de-Bellechasse, Quebec, Lapierre started out in politics as city councillor in Beaumont, Quebec in 1971. In 1974 he became mayor where he remained until 1985. After a nine-year hiatus, he was elected mayor again, which he remained until 2004. From 2001 to 2004 he was also a prefect in the Bellechasse MRC. In the 2004 Canadian federal election, he was elected into the House of Commons of Canada as a Bloc Québécois member in the riding of Lévis—Bellechasse. He was defeated in the 2006 election.

Parliament of Canada
Preceded by Electoral district created in 2003, please see Bellechasse—Etchemins— Montmagny—L'Islet and Lévis-et-Chutes-de-la-Chaudière	Member of Parliament for Lévis—Bellechasse; 2004-2006	Succeeded by Steven Blaney, Conservative
