= Boyer River (disambiguation) =

Boyer River is a tributary of the Missouri River.

Boyer River may also refer to:

- Boyer River (Alberta)
- Boyer River (Quebec), a small river that empties into the Saint Lawrence River

== See also ==
- Boy River, the name of a city and a river in Minnesota
