= Honfleur, Quebec =

Honfleur
- Municipality
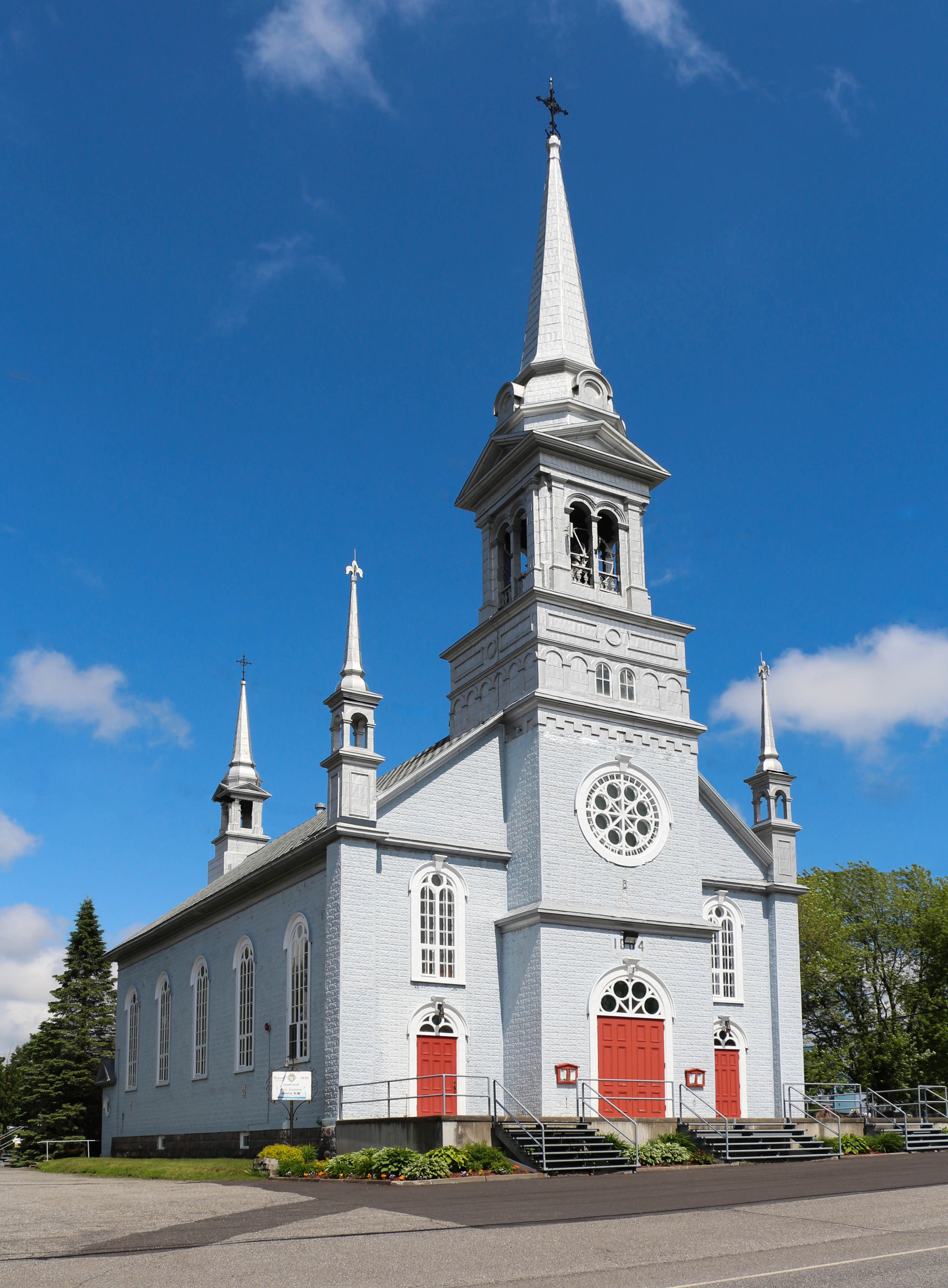
- Notre-Dame-du-Bon-Conseil Church
- Motto: Floreat Honfleur ("May Honfleur flourish")
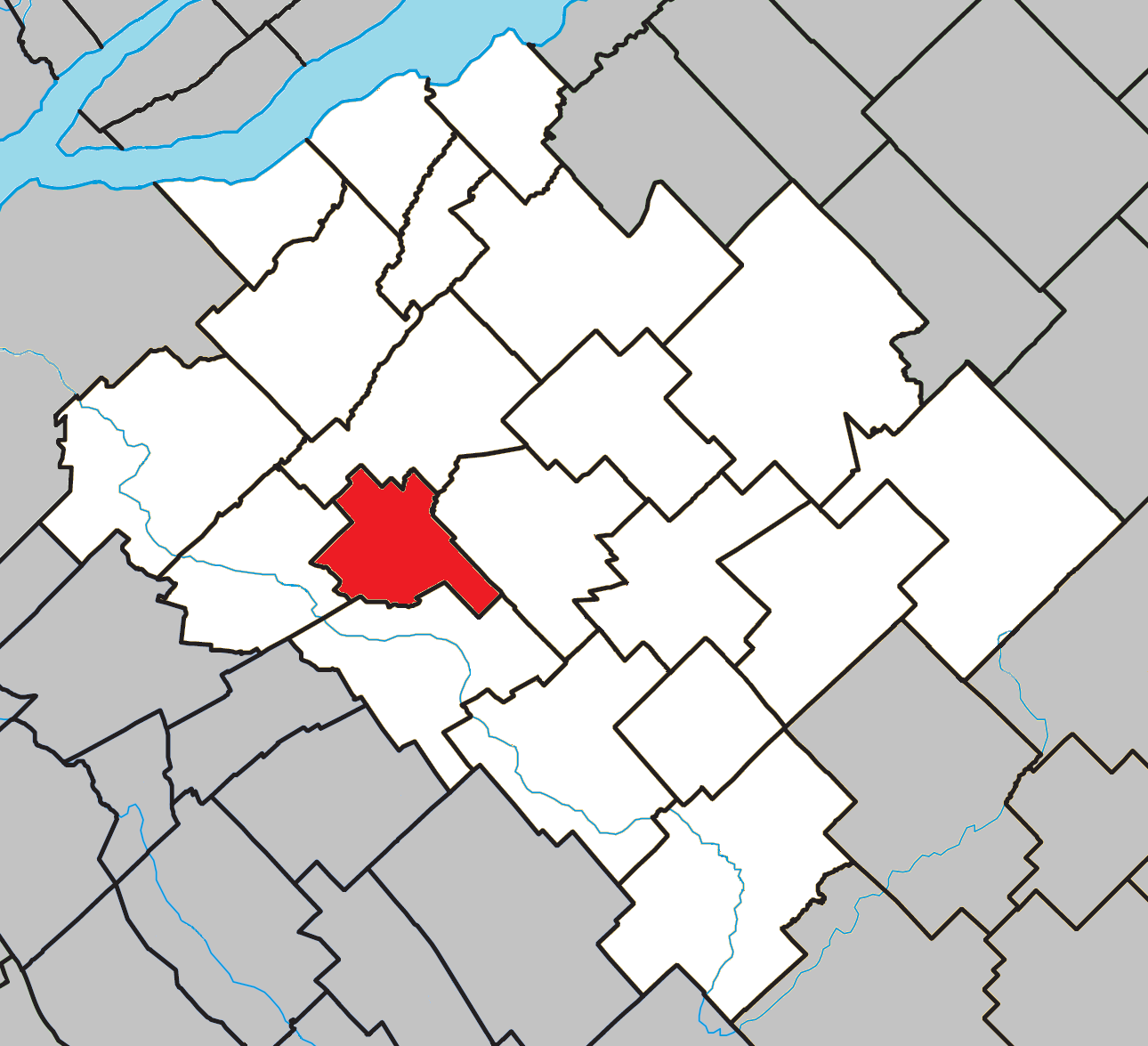
- Location within Bellechasse RCM

- Location in southern Quebec
- Coordinates: 46°39′21″N 70°52′50″W
- Country: Canada
- Province: Quebec
- Region: Chaudière-Appalaches
- RCM: Bellechasse
- Constituted: March 5, 1915

Government
  - Mayor: Luc Dion
  - Federal riding: Bellechasse—Les Etchemins—Lévis
  - Prov. riding: Bellechasse

Area
  - Total: 50.70 km^{2} (19.58 sq mi)
  - Land: 50.67 km^{2} (19.56 sq mi)

Population (2021)
  - Total: 881
  - Density: 17.4/km^{2} (45/sq mi)
  - Pop 2016–2021: ▲3.8%
  - Dwellings: 338
- Time zone: UTC−5 (EST)
  - Summer (DST): UTC−4 (EDT)
- Postal code: G0R 1N0
- Area codes: 418 and 581
- Highways: No major routes
- Website: www.munhonfleur.net

Honfleur (French: [ɔ̃flœʁ]) is a municipality in the Bellechasse Regional County Municipality in the Chaudière-Appalaches region of Quebec, Canada. In the 2021 Canadian census, the municipality had a population of 881 living in 338 of its 353 total private dwellings, a change of 3.8 per cent from its 2016 population of 849. With a land area of 50.67 km^{2}, it had a population density of 17.4 inhabitants per square kilometre.

The municipality is located about 9 kilometres northeast of Saint-Anselme. The Boyer River rises within its territory.

== Name and etymology ==
The name Honfleur was adopted from the local post office established in 1903 and refers to Honfleur in Calvados, Normandy, France. The Commission de toponymie du Québec states that the name recalls the French port from which many sailors departed for North America in the 16th and 17th centuries, including Samuel de Champlain in 1603.

According to the same source, the Quebec municipality may also have received its name because an ancestor of Cardinal Louis-Nazaire Bégin was from Saint-Léonard-de-Honfleur. The parish of Notre-Dame-du-Bon-Conseil de Honfleur was erected in 1905, and the official demonym is Honfleurois.

== History ==
Honfleur was constituted as a municipality on March 5, 1915. The Commission de toponymie du Québec identifies it as a small agricultural municipality in the Bellechasse area.

== Demographics ==
Historical population
Year	Pop.	±%
1991	734	—
1996	727	−1.0%
2001	746	+2.6%
2006	774	+3.8%
2011	765	−1.2%
2016	849	+11.0%
2021	881	+3.8%

In the 2021 Census of Population conducted by Statistics Canada, Honfleur had a population of 881, up 3.8% from 849 in 2016.

== Government ==
The mayor of Honfleur is Luc Dion.

For provincial representation, Honfleur is in the electoral district of Bellechasse. Federally, it is in Bellechasse—Les Etchemins—Lévis.

== Heraldry ==
Honfleur was granted municipal arms on June 18, 1991. The grant was announced in the Canada Gazette on July 20, 1991. The municipal motto is Floreat Honfleur, meaning "May Honfleur flourish".
