= Rivière du Moulin (Bras Saint-Michel) =

River in Chaudière-Appalaches, Quebec, Canada

- Location within Quebec

Location
- Country: Canada
- Province: Quebec
- Region: Chaudière-Appalaches
- MRC: Bellechasse Regional County Municipality

Physical characteristics
- Source: Agricultural streams
  - location: Saint-Lazare
  - coordinates: 46.666061°N 70.766539°W
  - elevation: 329 metres (1,079 ft)
- Mouth: Bras Saint-Michel
  - location: Saint-Gervais
  - coordinates: 46.76611°N 70.86333°W
  - elevation: 84 metres (276 ft)
- Length: 20.3 kilometres (12.6 mi)

Basin features
- Progression: Bras Saint-Michel, rivière du Sud (Montmagny), St. Lawrence River
- Tributaries
  - left: (upstream) ruisseau Leblond
  - right: (upstream) ruisseau Larochelle

The rivière du Moulin crosses the municipalities of Saint-Lazare, Saint-Nérée and Saint-Gervais, in the Bellechasse Regional County Municipality, in the administrative region of Chaudière-Appalaches, in Quebec, in Canada.

The Moulin river is a tributary of the south bank of the Bras Saint-Michel, which flows north-east to empty onto the north-west bank of the rivière du Sud (Montmagny); the latter flows north-east to the south shore of the St. Lawrence River.

== Geography ==
The Moulin River has its source in the sixth rang East, at 1.7 kilometres (1.1 mi) northeast of the center of the village of Saint-Lazare. From its source, the Moulin river flows over 20.3 kilometres (12.6 mi), divided into the following segments:

- 4.4 kilometres (2.7 mi) east, then north in Saint-Lazare, up to the limit of Saint-Nérée;
- 4.9 kilometres (3.0 mi) northeasterly, curving northeasterly to the boundary between the municipalities of Saint-Nérée and Saint-Gervais;
- 4.1 kilometres (2.5 mi) north-west to a road;
- 3.6 kilometres (2.2 mi) north-west to a road that crosses the Faubourg-du-Moulin;
- 2.2 kilometres (1.4 mi) northward to the confluence of the Larochelle stream;
- 1.1 kilometres (0.68 mi) north, up to its confluence.

The Moulin River empties on the south shore of Bras Saint-Michel in the municipality of Saint-Gervais (at the limit of Saint-Charles-Borromée). This confluence is located at 4.5 kilometres (2.8 mi) north of the center of the village of Saint-Gervais, at 9.1 kilometres (5.7 mi) south of the center from the village of La Durantaye.

== Toponymy ==
The toponym Rivière du Moulin was made official on January 21, 1975, at the Commission de toponymie du Québec.

== See also ==
- List of rivers of Quebec
