= Saint-Henri, Quebec =

Saint-Henri, Quebec may refer to:

- Saint-Henri, Montreal, a neighbourhood of Montreal, Quebec
- Saint-Henri, Chaudière-Appalaches, Quebec, a municipality of Quebec in the vicinity of Lévis
