= Boyer River (Bellechasse) =

River in Chaudière-Appalaches, Quebec (Canada)

Location
- Country: Canada
- Province: Quebec
- Region: Chaudière-Appalaches
- MRC: Bellechasse Regional County Municipality
- Municipality: Saint-Charles-de-Bellechasse, Saint-Michel-de-Bellechasse and Saint-Vallier

Physical characteristics
- Source: Confluence of Boyer River North et Boyer River South
  - location: Saint-Charles-de-Bellechasse
  - coordinates: 46°43′42″N 70°57′52″W
  - elevation: 61 m (200 ft)
- Mouth: Chenal des Grands Voiliers (Saint Lawrence River)
  - location: Saint-Michel-de-Bellechasse
  - coordinates: 46°53′08″N 70°51′37″W
  - elevation: 4 m (13 ft)
- Length: 34.0 km (21.1 mi)

Basin features
- Tributaries
  - left: (upstream) ruisseau Blais, ruisseau des Sources, ruisseau Nadeau, ruisseau Boucher, ruisseau Labrie, Boyer River North
  - right: (upstream) ruisseau du Portage, ruisseau des Boutin, Boyer River South

The Boyer River (Rivière Boyer in French) is a tributary of Chenal des Grands Voiliers, on the south shore of Saint Lawrence River. This small river of about 40 kilometres (25 mi) in length flows in the municipalities of Saint-Charles-de-Bellechasse, Saint-Michel-de-Bellechasse and Saint-Vallier, in the Bellechasse Regional County Municipality, in the administrative region of Chaudière-Appalaches, in Quebec, in Canada.

The lower part of this valley is served by the route 132 which runs along the southeast bank of the St. Lawrence River, and also by the road of the second range West (which becomes Rang Nord-Est and Avenue Royale, further south), Chemin du 3e rang Ouest (which becomes Chemin du rang Sud-Est, further south).

Apart from a few forest areas crossed by the river, agriculture is the main economic activity in this valley.

The surface of the Boyer River is generally frozen from the beginning of December until the end of March, except the rapids areas; however, safe circulation on the ice is generally done from mid-December to mid-March. The water level of the river varies with the seasons and the precipitation; the spring flood occurs in March or April.

== Geography ==
The Boyer River rises at the confluence of the Boyer North River and Boyer South River rivers, at Saint-Charles-de-Bellechasse. This source is located in range Nord-Ouest 4.8 km south-west of the center of the village of Saint-Charles-de-Bellechasse, south-east of Plée de Saint-Charles and 1, 3 km northeast of the limit of Saint-Henri.

From its source, the Boyer River flows 34.0 km, divided into the following segments:

- 5.6 km (or 3.0 km in a straight line) to the northeast, meandering to route 279;
- 7.4 km (or 3.7 km in a straight line) to the northeast, meandering from the south side of the village of Saint-Charles-de-Bellechasse to the road bridge connecting the route 218 and the road along the southeast side of the river;
- 7.4 km (3.7 km in a straight line) to the northeast, collecting the waters of Portage brook and winding up to the limit between the municipalities of Saint-Charles-de-Bellechasse and Saint-Michel-de-Bellechasse;
- 6.4 km (or 3.9 km in a straight line) to the northeast, to the route 281 bridge;
- 4.3 km (or 2.0 km in a straight line) towards the north-east, passing through the north-west of the village of La Durantaye, up to the highway 20;
- 2.9 km north-east, to its confluence. The last 1.9 km segment forms the boundary between the municipalities of Saint-Michel-de-Bellechasse and Saint-Vallier.

The Boyer river flows onto the long shore of the Saint-Vallier bank, in the Saint-Vallier cove, on the south bank of the Saint Lawrence River. This confluence is located on the west side of the village of Saint-Vallier, on the east side of the village of Saint-Michel-de-Bellechasse and opposite the village of Saint-Jean-de-l'Île-d'Orléans located on Île d'Orléans. This confluence is located east of the confluence of the Mothers river and the Bellechasse stream.

Its main tributaries are:

- Boyer River North,
- Boyer River South,
- Portage stream.

== Toponymy ==
The toponym "rivière Boyer" was officialized on December 5, 1968, at the Commission de toponymie du Québec.

== See also ==
- St. Lawrence River
- Chenal des Grands Voiliers
- Boyer River North, a stream
- Boyer River South, a stream
- Portage Creek, a stream
- Saint-Charles-de-Bellechasse, a municipality
- Saint-Michel-de-Bellechasse, a municipality
- Saint-Vallier, a municipality
- Bellechasse Regional County Municipality (MRC)
- List of rivers of Quebec
