= Saint-Nérée-de-Bellechasse =

- Municipality
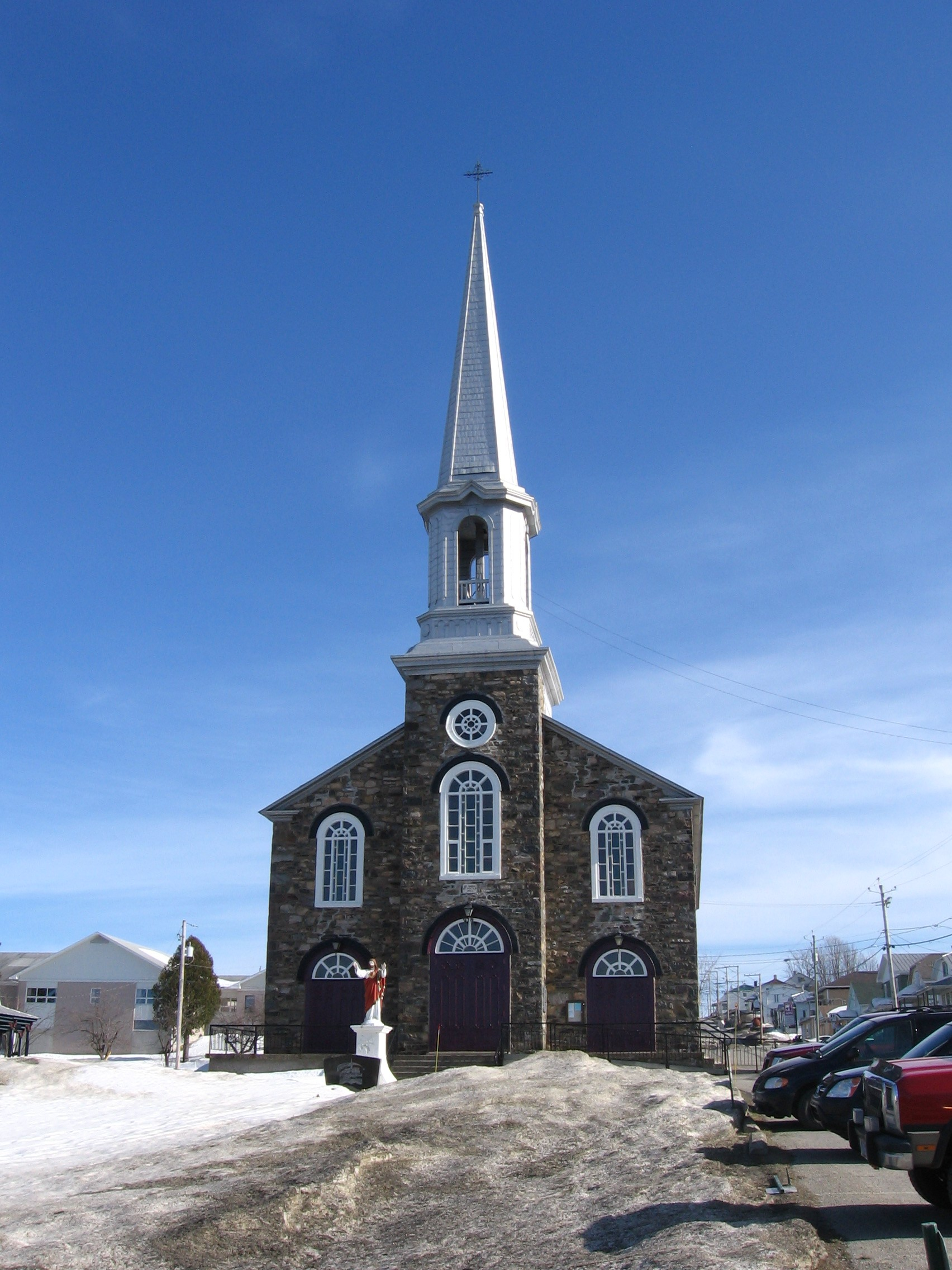

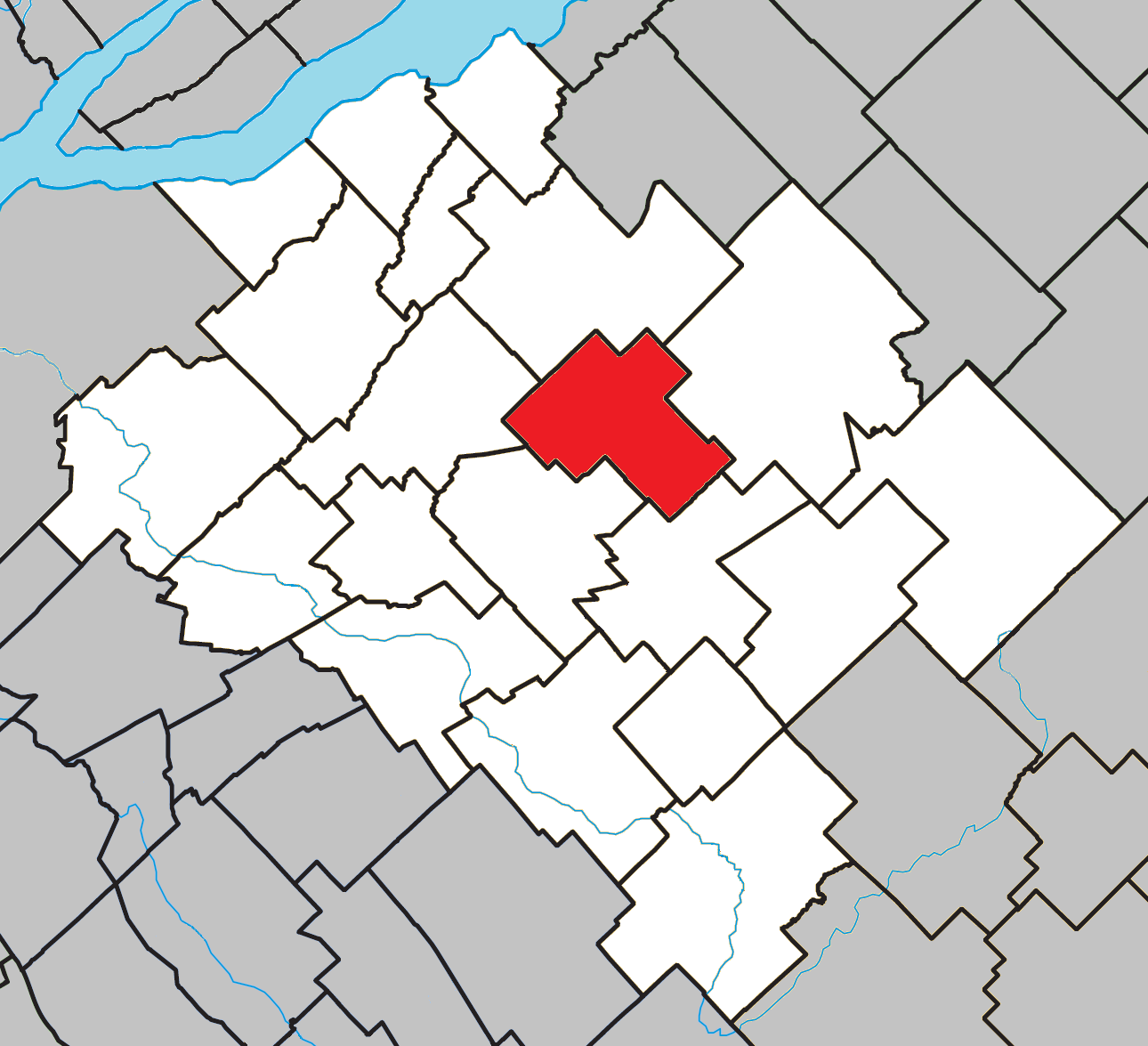
- Location within Bellechasse RCM.

- Location in province of Quebec.
- Coordinates: 46°44′N 70°43′W
- Country: Canada
- Province: Quebec
- Region: Chaudière-Appalaches
- RCM: Bellechasse
- Constituted: March 29, 1887

Government
  - Mayor: Pascal Fournier
  - Federal riding: Bellechasse—Les Etchemins—Lévis
  - Prov. riding: Bellechasse

Area
  - Total: 76.30 km^{2} (29.46 sq mi)
  - Land: 75.23 km^{2} (29.05 sq mi)

Population (2011)
  - Total: 743
  - Density: 9.9/km^{2} (26/sq mi)
  - Pop 2006-2011: ▼5.8%
  - Dwellings: 468
- Time zone: UTC−5 (EST)
  - Summer (DST): UTC−4 (EDT)
- Postal code(s): G0R 3V0
- Area codes: 418 and 581
- Highways: No major routes
- Website: www.st-neree.qc.ca

Saint-Nérée-de-Bellechasse (French pronunciation: [sɛ̃ neʁe də bɛlʃas]) is a municipality of 739 people in the Bellechasse Regional County Municipality, part of the Chaudière-Appalaches administrative region.

Prior to February 18, 2012, it was known simply as Saint-Nérée.
