= Beaumont, Quebec =

Beaumont
- Municipality
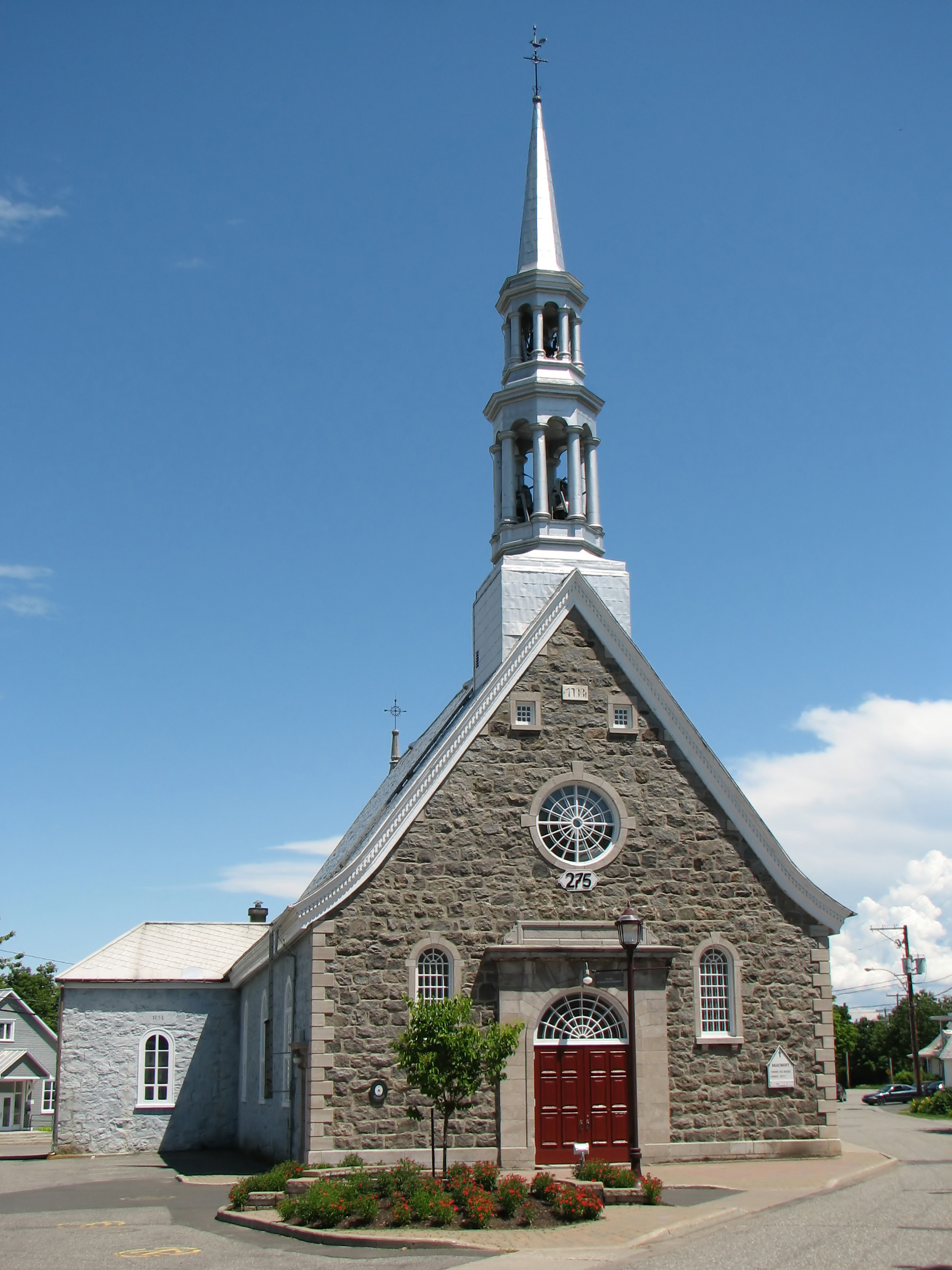
- Saint Etienne Church

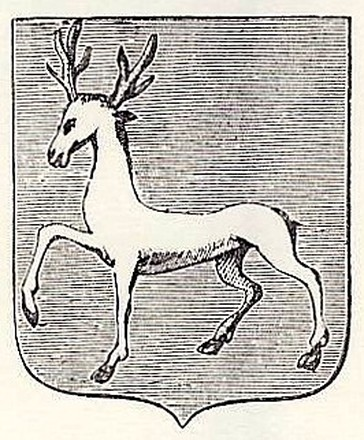
- Coat of arms

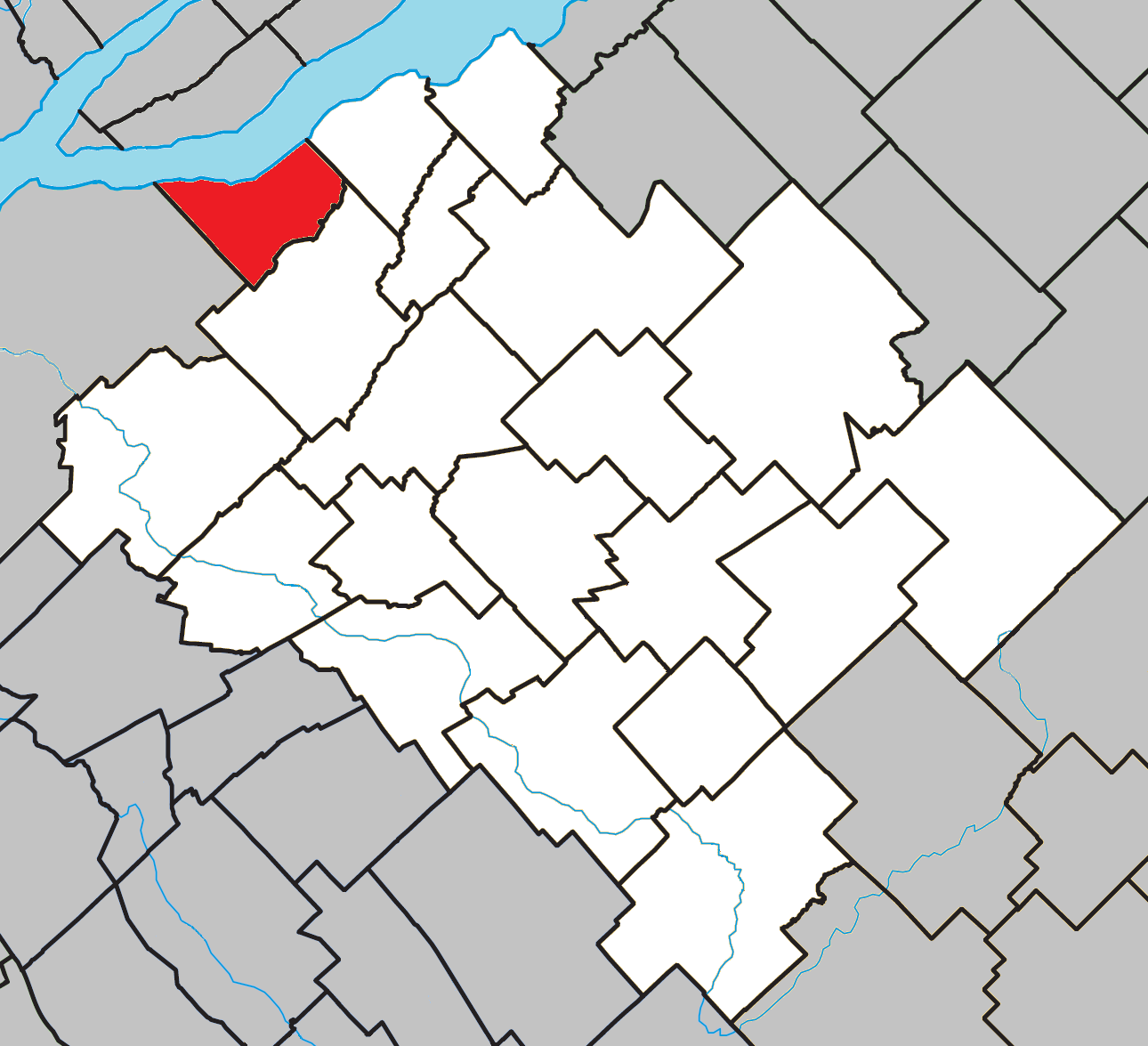
- Location within Bellechasse RCM.

- Location in province of Quebec.
- Coordinates: 46°49′N 71°00′W
- Country: Canada
- Province: Quebec
- Region: Chaudière-Appalaches
- RCM: Bellechasse
- Constituted: July 1, 1855

Government
  - Mayor: David Christopher
  - Federal riding: Bellechasse—Les Etchemins—Lévis
  - Prov. riding: Bellechasse

Area
  - Total: 44.70 km^{2} (17.26 sq mi)
  - Land: 44.70 km^{2} (17.26 sq mi)

Population (2016)
  - Total: 2,942
  - Density: 65.8/km^{2} (170/sq mi)
  - Pop 2011-2016: ▲21.6%
  - Dwellings: 1,328
- Time zone: UTC−5 (EST)
  - Summer (DST): UTC−4 (EDT)
- Postal code(s): G0R 1C0
- Area codes: 418 and 581
- Highways A-20 (TCH): R-132; R-279
- Website: beaumont-qc.com

Beaumont (French pronunciation: [bomɔ̃]) is a municipality of about 2,900 people 10 km east of Lévis, next to the Saint Lawrence River, in the Bellechasse Regional County Municipality in the Chaudière-Appalaches region of Quebec. It is a mostly rural community, with most people working in Lévis as there are no major businesses in Beaumont. It was chosen as one of the top 20 nicest villages in the province of Quebec.

It is crossed by Route 132, with many of its shops and commodities built alongside it. A few small streets are attached to the road, but the rest of the municipality is divided using the seigneurial system. The many open fields in Beaumont stretch all the way to the Saint Lawrence river, giving the visitors a large panorama.
