= Quebec Route 218 =

Highway in Quebec

Route 218

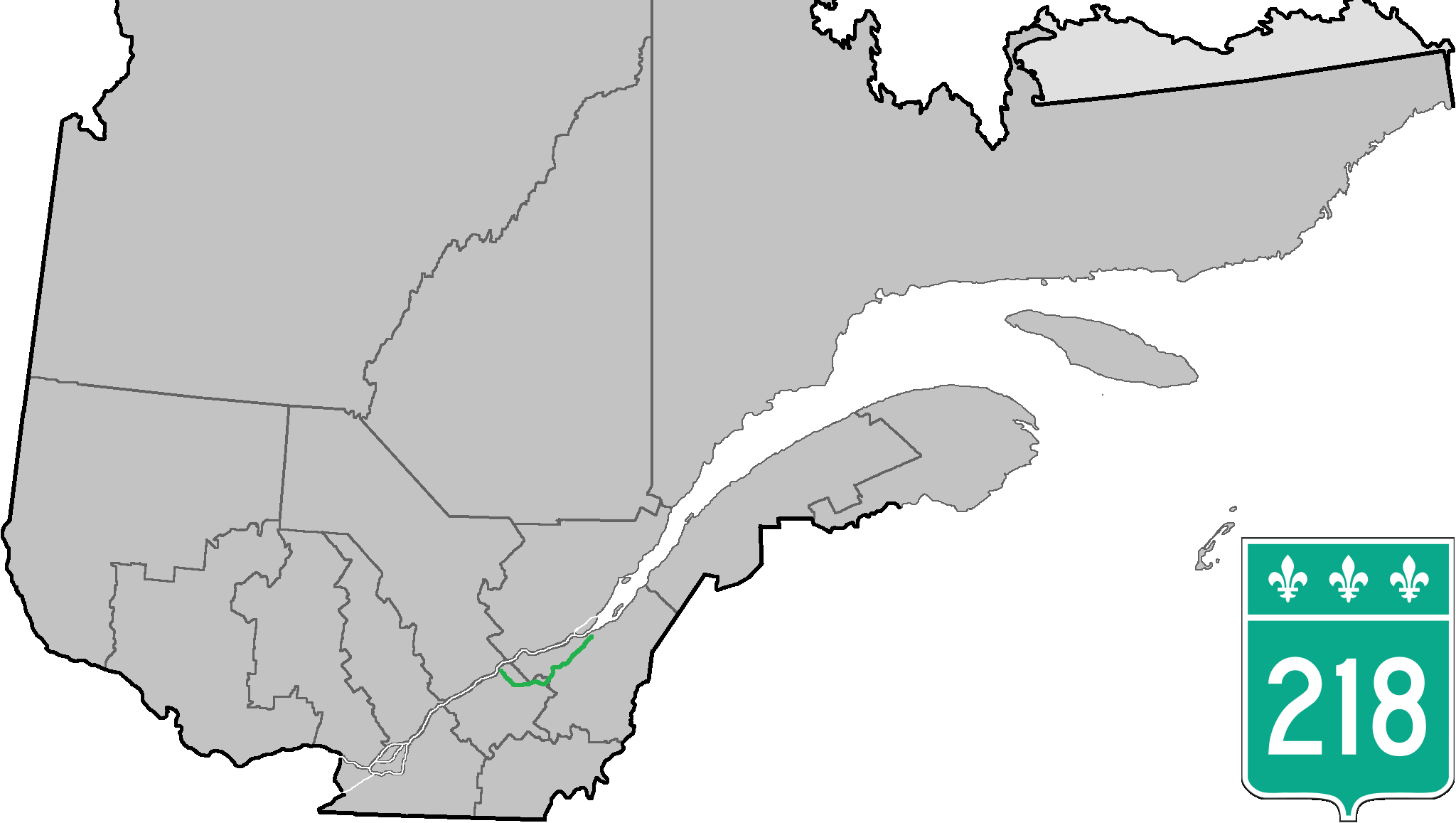

Route information
- Maintained by Transports Québec
- Length: 155.5 km (96.6 mi)

Major junctions
- West end: R-132 in Saint-Pierre-les-Becquets
- R-226 in Sainte-Sophie-de-Lévrard; A-20 (TCH) in Manseau; R-265 in Notre-Dame-de-Lourdes; R-116 in Lyster; R-271 in Sainte-Agathe-de-Lotbinière; R-269 in Saint-Gilles; A-73 / R-171 / R-175 in Saint-Lambert-de-Lauzon; R-173 / R-275 / R-277 in Saint-Henri-de-Lévis; R-279 in Saint-Charles-de-Bellechasse
- East end: R-281 in Saint-Michel-de-Bellechasse

Location
- Country: Canada
- Province: Quebec

Highway system
- Quebec provincial highways; Autoroutes; List; Former
← R-217	→ R-219

Route 218 is a two-lane east/west highway in Quebec, Canada. Its western terminus is at the junction of Route 132 in Saint-Pierre-les-Becquets and its eastern terminus is in Saint-Michel-de-Bellechasse at the junction of Route 281.

== Route description ==
From Saint-Pierre-les-Becquets to its junction with Autoroute 20, it runs southeasterly (except from a brief northeastern-bound concurrency with Route 226) until it reaches the Bécancour River, which it follows West on its North shore until Lyster, where it shares a concurrency with Route 116. From there it turns northeasterly toward a concurrency with Route 271 in Sainte-Agathe-de-Lotbinière and its junction with Route 269 between Saint-Patrice-de-Beaurivage and Saint-Gilles, with both routes following the Beaurivage River downstream before separating at Saint-Gilles, where Route 218 crosses the river toward Saint-Lambert-de-Lauzon, where it crosses the Chaudière River. From there it goes to very join briefly the lengthy concurrency between Routes 273 and Route 175 before Route 273 separate, leaving the two others going Northeast to cross the Etchemin River in Saint-Henri-de-Lévis, where Route 175 goes Northwest while Route 218 goes Southeast for a 1 km concurrency with Route 277. Finally, it goes again northeasterly, roughly following the Boyer River toward Saint-Charles-de-Bellechasse and its terminus just south of Autoroute 20.

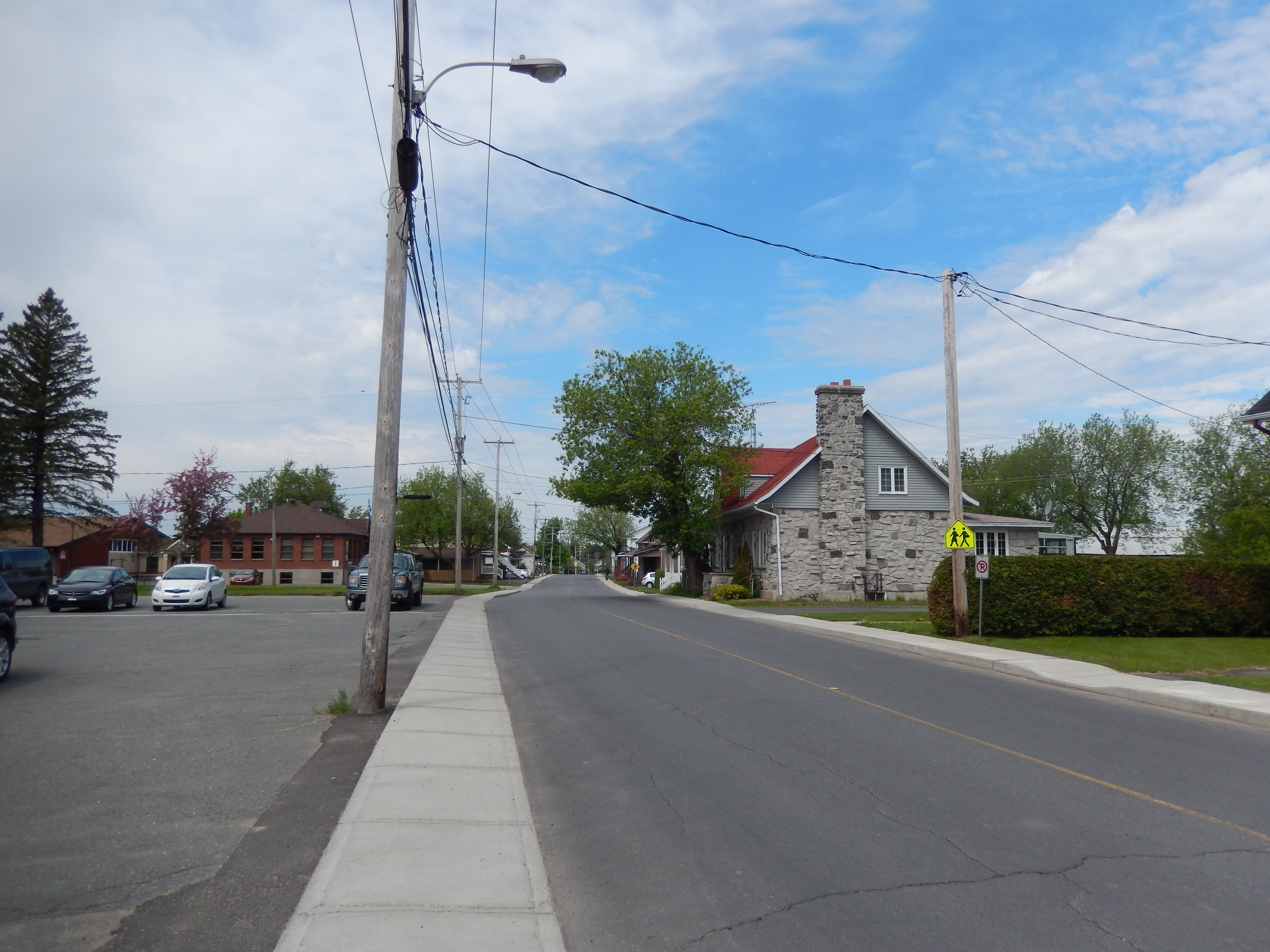
Route 218 in Notre-Dame-de-Lourdes.

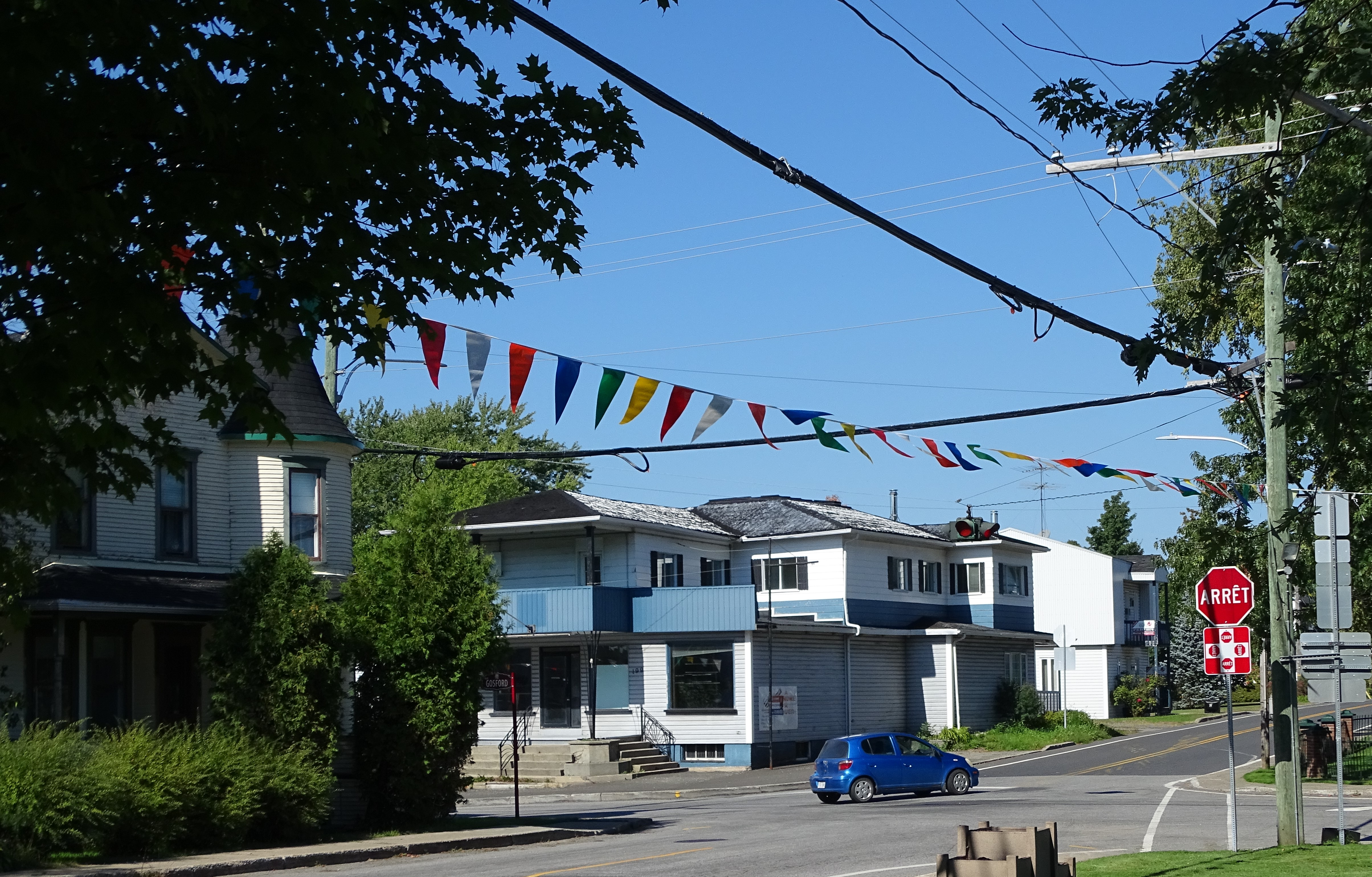
Route 218 shares its itinerary with Route 271 through Sainte-Agathe-de-Lotbinière.

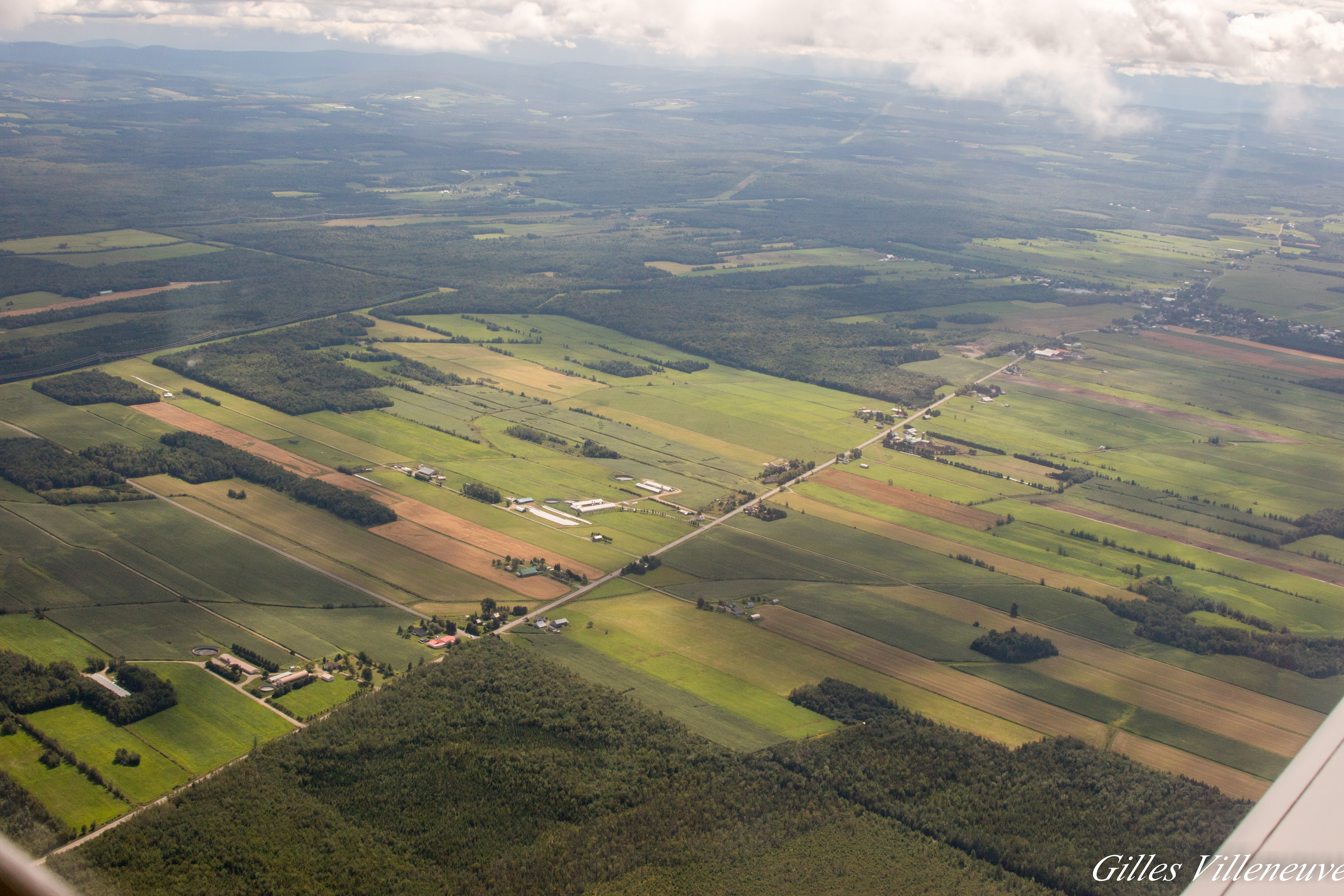
Route 218 follows Gosford Road in Sainte-Agathe.

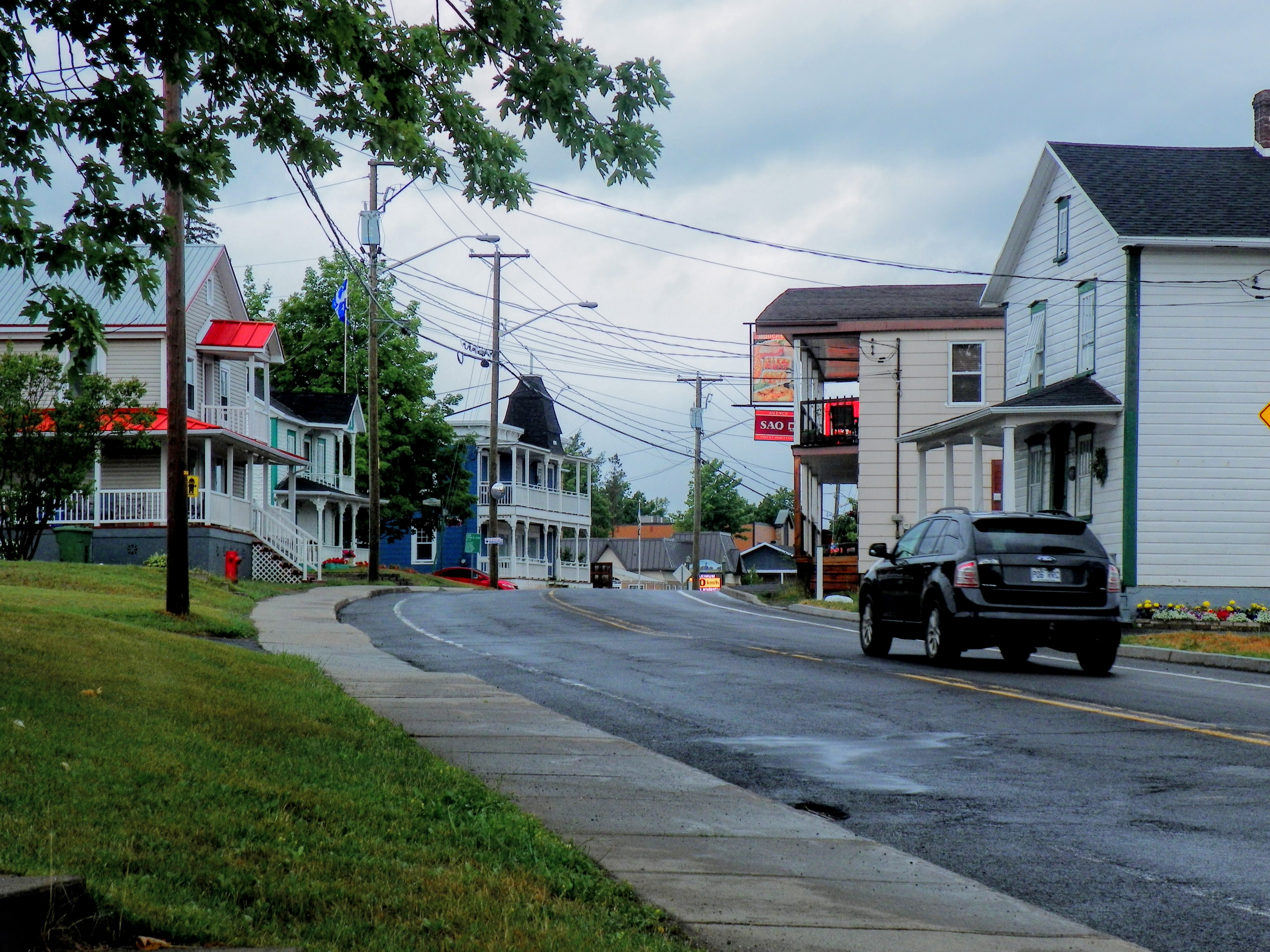
Route 218 shares its itinerary with Route 269 through Saint-Gilles.

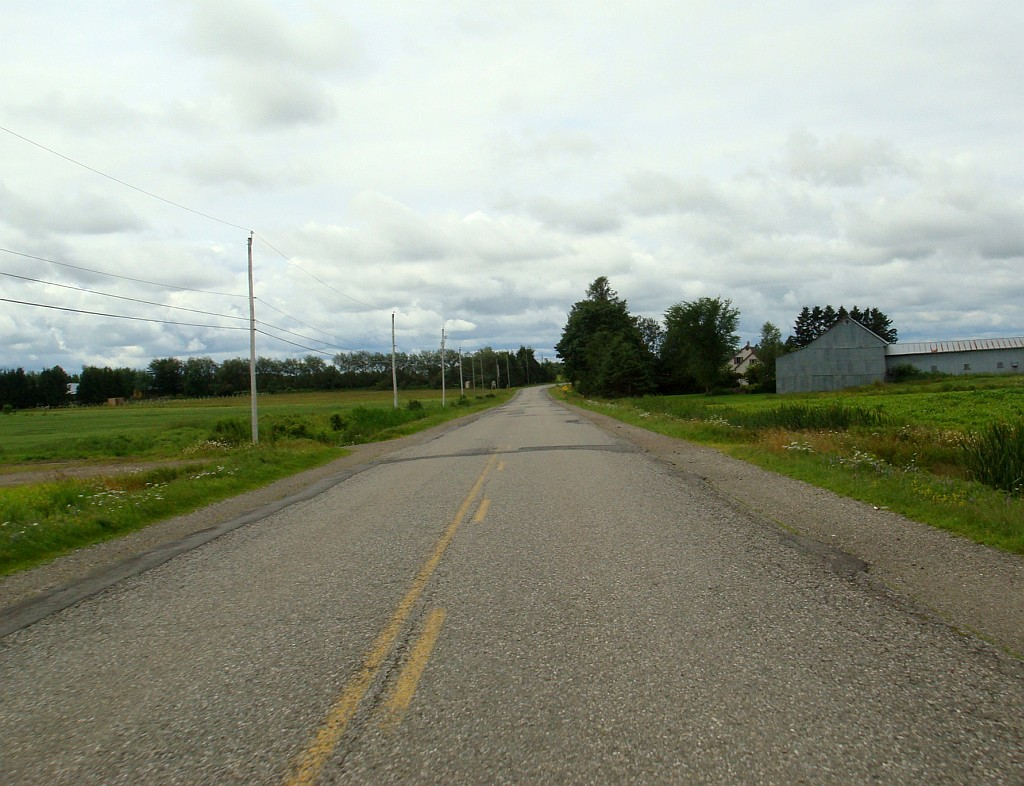
Route 218 between Saint-Gilles and Saint-Lambert.

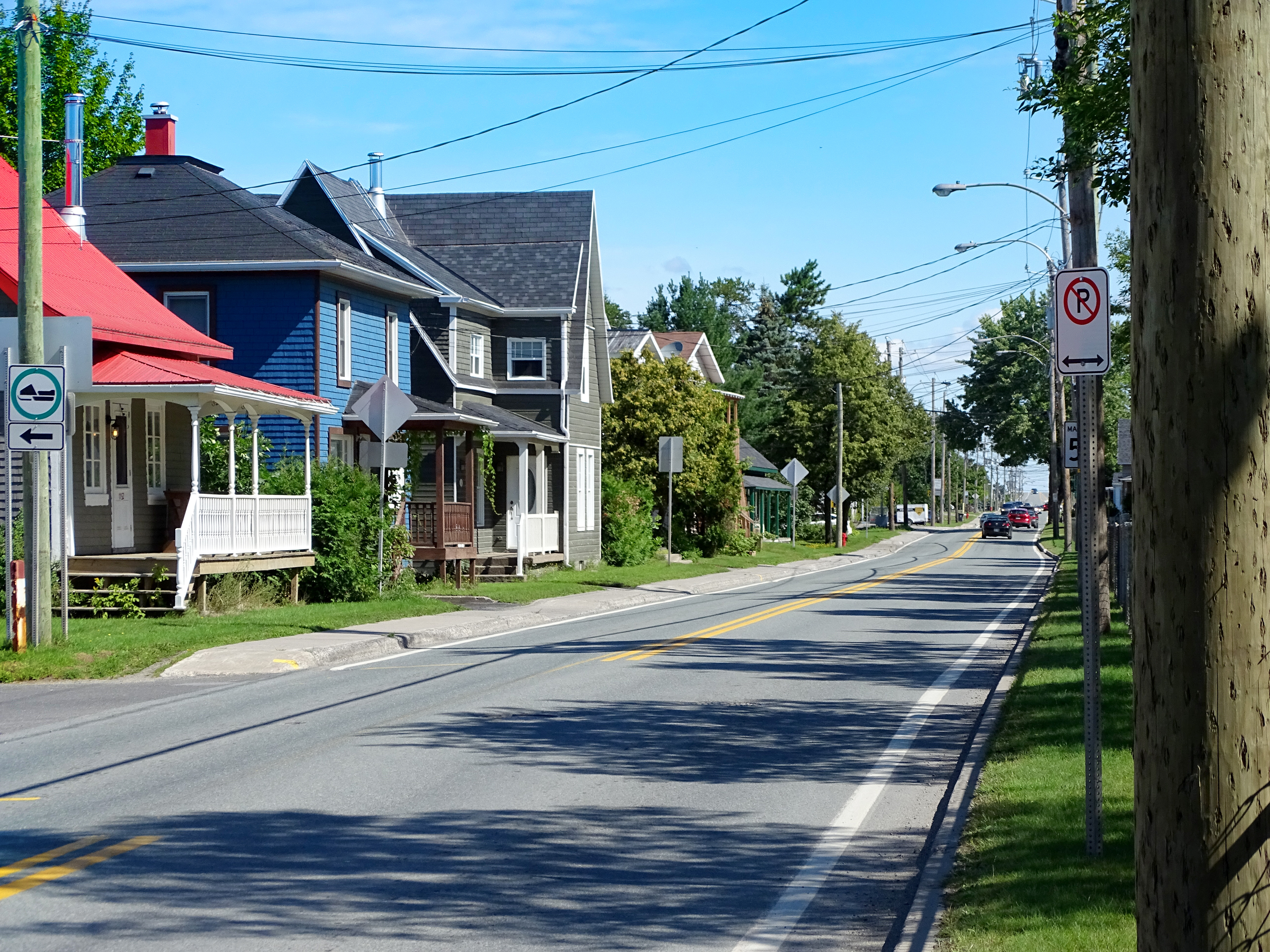
Pont street in Saint-Lambert, is marked as Route 218.

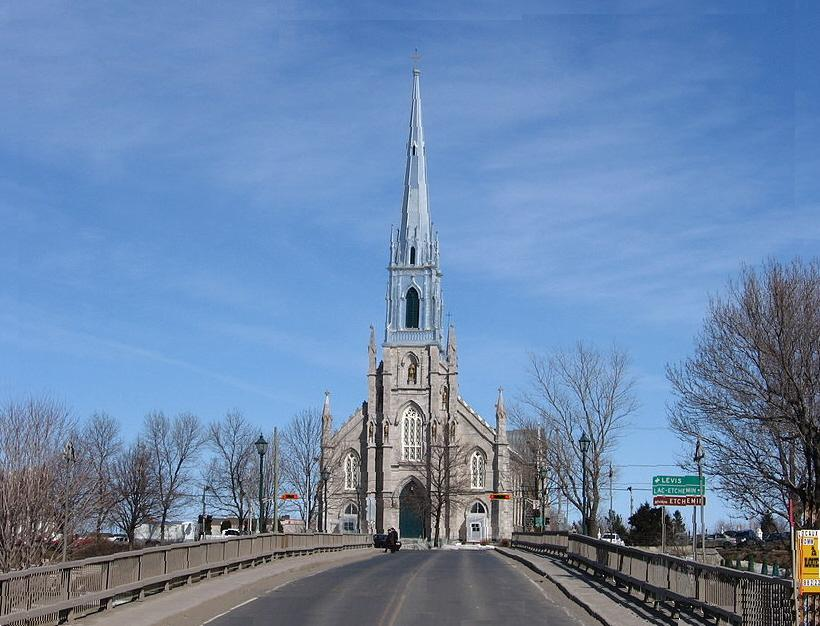
Bridge over Etchemin River in Saint-Henri.

== Municipalities along Route 218 ==
- Saint-Pierre-les-Becquets
- Sainte-Cécile-de-Lévrard
- Sainte-Sophie-de-Lévrard
- Manseau
- Notre-Dame-de-Lourdes
- Lyster
- Sainte-Agathe-de-Lotbinière
- Saint-Gilles
- Saint-Lambert-de-Lauzon
- Saint-Henri-de-Lévis
- Saint-Charles-de-Bellechasse
- Saint-Michel-de-Bellechasse

== See also ==
- List of Quebec provincial highways
