= Saint-Anselme =

- Municipality
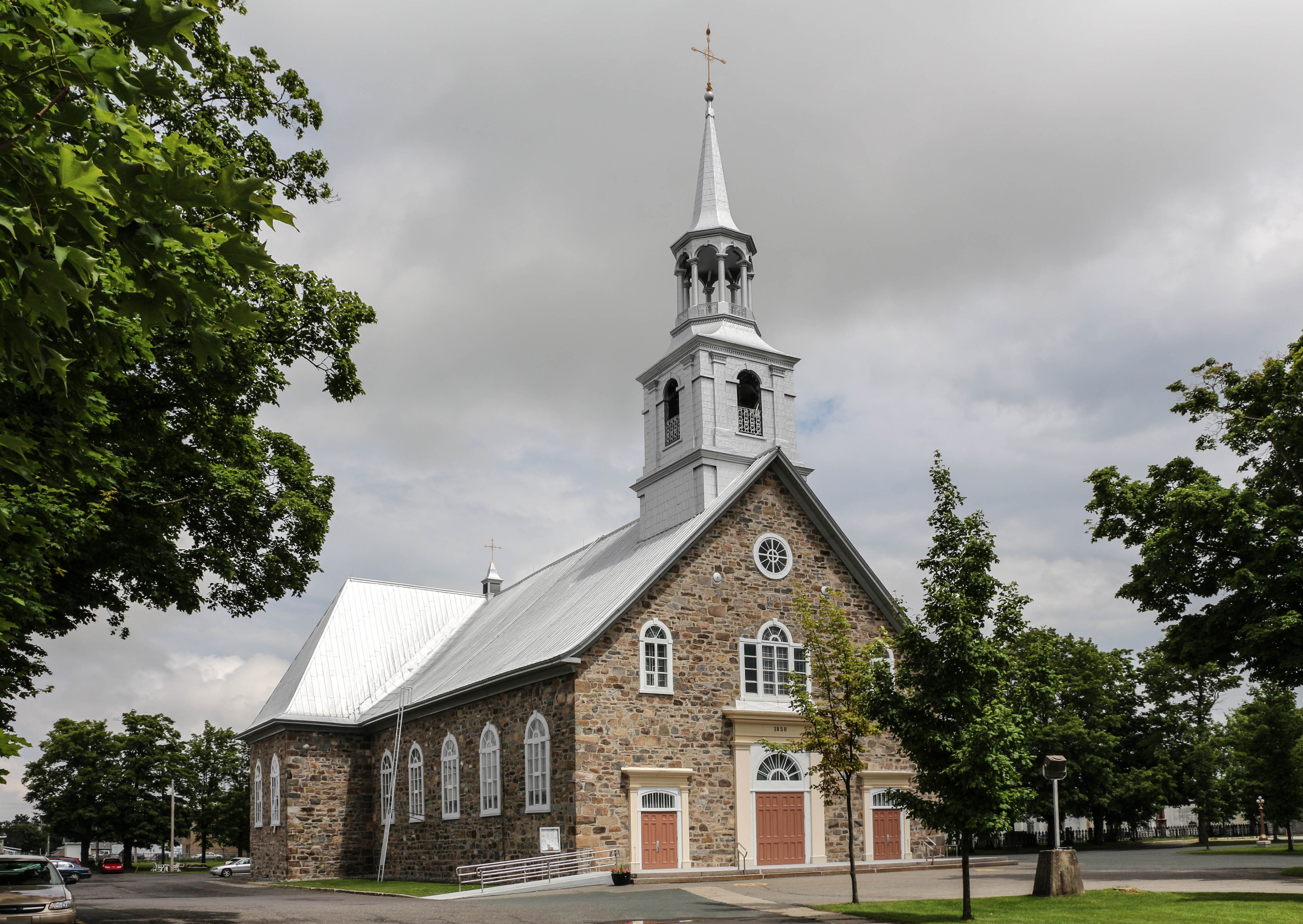
- Saint-Anselme Church

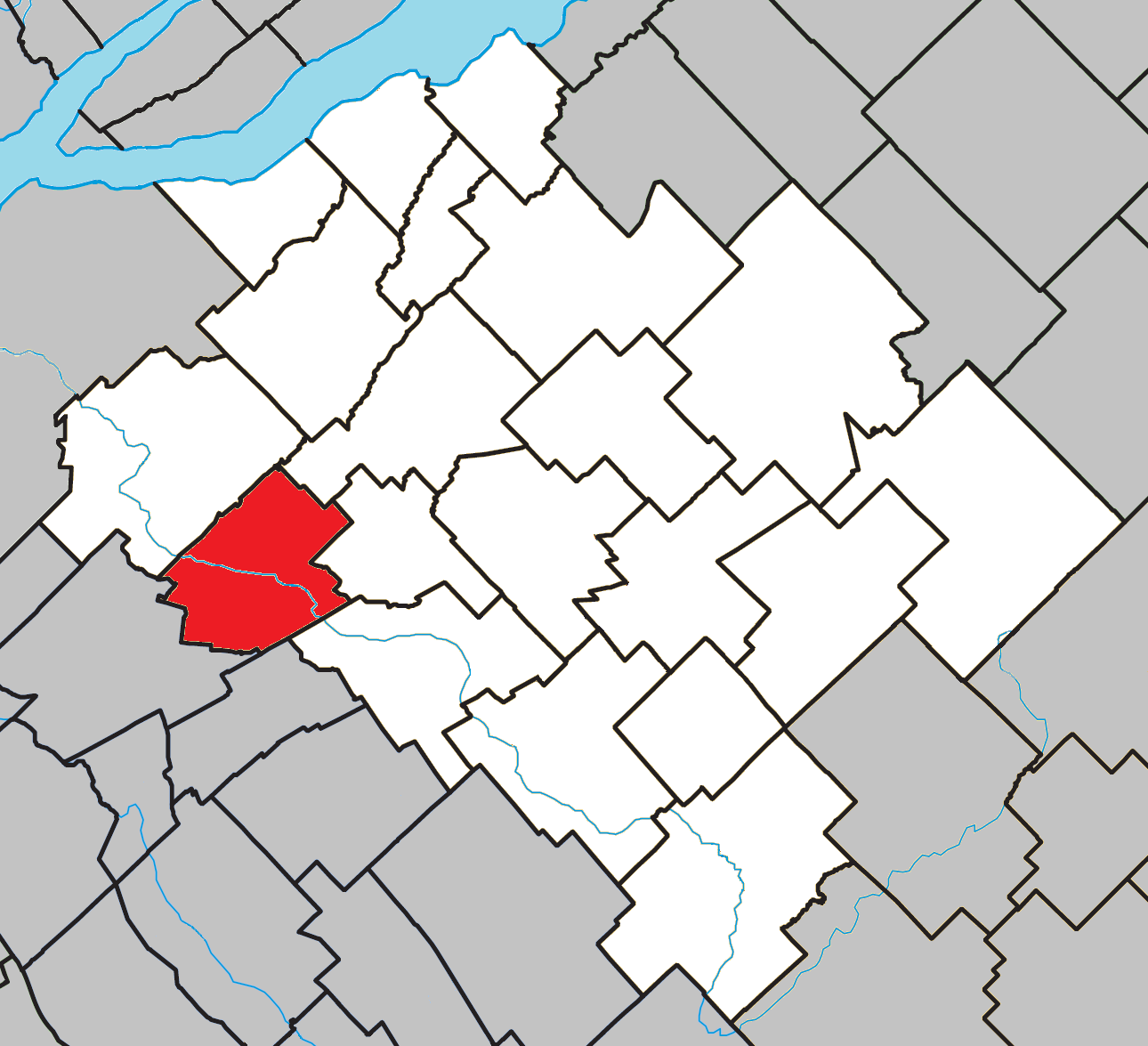
- Location within Bellechasse RCM.

- Location in province of Quebec. Saint-Anselme (Canada)
- Coordinates: 46°38′N 70°58′W
- Country: Canada
- Province: Quebec
- Region: Chaudière-Appalaches
- RCM: Bellechasse
- Constituted: January 7, 1998

Government
  - Mayor: Yves Turgeon
  - Federal riding: Bellechasse—Les Etchemins—Lévis
  - Prov. riding: Bellechasse

Area
  - Total: 74.90 km^{2} (28.92 sq mi)
  - Land: 74.22 km^{2} (28.66 sq mi)

Population (2021)
  - Total: 4,047
  - Density: 54.5/km^{2} (141/sq mi)
  - Pop 2016-2021: ▲2.8%
  - Dwellings: 1,772
- Time zone: UTC−5 (EST)
  - Summer (DST): UTC−4 (EDT)
- Postal code(s): G0R 2N0
- Area codes: 418 and 581
- Highways: R-277
- Website: www.st-anselme.ca

Saint-Anselme (French pronunciation: [sɛ̃t‿ɑ̃sɛlm]) is a village in the Bellechasse Regional County Municipality, part of the Chaudière-Appalaches administrative region of Quebec, Canada. It is the second biggest municipality in the RCM, after Saint-Henri. The Etchemin River goes through the village.

== History ==
The municipality of the parish of Saint-Anselme was founded in 1845. The municipality of the village of Saint-Anselme was created in 1920. The two municipalities were merged in 1998 to create the current municipality.

The year 1829 marked the start of religious construction. A chapel-presbytery was built according to the plans of architect Thomas Baillairgé and his mentor, Abbé Jérôme Demers, Vicar General. François Audet dit Lapointe, then living in Saint-Charles, where he had just finished enlarging the church, was awarded the contract to build the chapel-presbytery, and then, in 1846, the present church, which was completed in 1850.

Around fifteen cooperative groups have been created since 1940:

- the Société coopérative agricole (1941);
- la Boulangerie coopérative (1943);
- the Meunerie coopérative (1949);
- the Garage coopératif (1955);
- Avicole régionale Etchemin;
- the Cercle des jeunes éleveurs.

Quebec Central and Canadian National railway lines have been located here since 1875, but were replaced by the Bellechasse cycloroute in 2012.

== Notable people ==
- Georges Dumont (Saint-Anselme, 1898 - Moncton, 1966), medical doctor and politician
- Louis-Napoléon Larochelle (1834-1890), manufacturer, railway contractor and politician
