= Bellechasse—Les Etchemins—Lévis =

Federal electoral district in Quebec, Canada

Coordinates: 46.64°N 70.53°W

Quebec electoral district
- Interactive map of riding boundaries from the 2025 federal election

Federal electoral district
- Legislature: House of Commons
MP
Dominique Vien
Conservative
- District created: 2003
- First contested: 2004
- Last contested: 2021
- District webpage: profile, map

Demographics
- Population (2016): 114,966
- Electors (2021): 94,257
- Area (km²): 3,202.78
- Pop. density (per km²): 35.9
- Census division(s): Bellechasse RCM, Les Etchemins RCM, Lévis
- Census subdivision(s): Lévis (part), Saint-Henri, Saint-Anselme, Lac-Etchemin, Sainte-Claire, Beaumont, Saint-Charles-de-Bellechasse, Saint-Raphaël, Saint-Gervais, Saint-Damien-de-Buckland

Bellechasse—Les Etchemins—Lévis (formerly Lévis—Bellechasse) is a federal electoral district in Quebec, Canada, that has been represented in the House of Commons of Canada since 2004. It was created in 2003 from Lévis-et-Chutes-de-la-Chaudière and Bellechasse—Etchemins—Montmagny—L'Islet ridings.

== Geography ==
The riding is located south of Quebec City and covers a strip of land between the city's cross-river suburbs and the Canada–US border. It is located in the Quebec region of Chaudière-Appalaches. It consists of the RCM of Bellechasse and most of Les Etchemins, as well as the eastern part of the city of Lévis.

The neighbouring ridings are Beauce, Lévis—Lotbinière, Louis-Hébert, Québec Centre, Beauport—Limoilou, Montmorency—Charlevoix, and Côte-du-Sud—Rivière-du-Loup—Kataskomiq—Témiscouata.

The 2012 federal electoral distribution concluded that this riding will retain its current boundaries, but was renamed Bellechasse—Les Etchemins—Lévis.

Following the 2022 Canadian federal electoral redistribution, the riding lost the area west of 4e Av. and Rue St-Eustache in Lévis to Lévis—Lotbinière.

== Profile ==
The rural regions to the east of the riding are extremely strong areas for the Conservatives. The city of Lévis, however, is more of a battleground region. In the 2011 election, the Tories had to contend with a strong NDP performance in that city. The NDP's support was more concentrated to the west of the Boulevard de la Rive-Sud, closer to the river front.

== Riding associations ==
Riding associations are the local branches of political parties:

Party	Association name	CEO	HQ city
Conservative	Association du Parti conservateur de Bellechasse—Les Etchemins—Lévis	Bruno Émond	Lévis
Green	Association du Parti vert de Bellechasse—Les Etchemins—Lévis	André Voyer	Lévis
Liberal	Association libérale fédérale Bellechasse—Les Etchemins—Lévis	Raphaël Crevier	Montreal
New Democratic	Association NPD Bellechasse—Les Etchemins—Lévis	Duncan Viktor Salvain	Montreal

== Members of Parliament ==
This riding has elected the following members of Parliament:

Parliament	Years	Member	Party
Lévis—Bellechasse; Riding created from Lévis-et-Chutes-de-la-Chaudière and Bellechasse—Etchemins—Montmagny—L'Islet
38th	2004–2006	Réal Lapierre	Bloc Québécois
39th	2006–2008	Steven Blaney	Conservative
40th	2008–2011	Steven Blaney	Conservative
41st	2011–2015	Steven Blaney	Conservative
Bellechasse—Les Etchemins—Lévis
42nd	2015–2019	Steven Blaney	Conservative
43rd	2019–2021	Steven Blaney	Conservative
44th	2021–2025	Dominique Vien	Conservative
45th	2025–present	Dominique Vien	Conservative

== Election results ==
Graph of election results in Lévis—Bellechasse, Bellechasse—Les Etchemins—Lévis (minor parties that never got 2% of the vote or didn't run consistently are omitted)

=== Bellechasse—Les Etchemins—Lévis, 2023 representation order ===
2025 Canadian federal election
Party	Candidate	Votes	%	±%	Expenditures
Conservative	Dominique Vien	32,097	49.08	–2.92	$35,952.98
Liberal	Glenn O'Farrell	18,642	28.51	+12.96	$51,416.72
Bloc Québécois	Gaby Breton	12,244	18.72	–4.04	$10,277.48
New Democratic	Marie-Philippe Gagnon Gauthier	1,621	2.48	–2.44	$24.38
People's	Mario Fréchette	794	1.21	N/A	$2,355.94
Total valid votes/expense limit		65,398	98.39	–	$137,588.31
Total rejected ballots		1,071	1.61		
Turnout		66,469	72.46		
Eligible voters		91,736			
Conservative notional hold		Swing		–7.94	
Source: Elections Canada
Note: number of eligible voters does not include voting day registrations.

2021 federal election redistributed results
Party	Vote	%
Conservative	30,341	52.00
Bloc Québécois	13,280	22.76
Liberal	9,070	15.55
New Democratic	2,869	4.92
Green	840	1.44
Others	1,945	3.33

=== Bellechasse—Les Etchemins—Lévis, 2013 representation order ===
Graph of election results in Bellechasse—Les Etchemins—Lévis (minor parties that never got 2% of the vote or didn't run consistently are omitted)

2021 Canadian federal election
Party	Candidate	Votes	%	±%	Expenditures
Conservative	Dominique Vien	32,259	51.04	+0.94	$27,017.86
Bloc Québécois	Marie-Christine Richard	14,670	23.21	+0.32	$15,804.72
Liberal	Daniel Vaillancourt	10,075	15.94	-0.72	$5,446.69
New Democratic	Marie-Philippe Gagnon Gauthier	3,183	5.04	-0.02	$0.48
Free	Raymond Arcand	1,802	2.85	–	$0.00
Green	Hélène Lefebvre	913	1.44	-1.54	$0.00
Independent	Chamroeun Khuon	306	0.48	–	$915.04
Total valid votes/expense limit		63,208	–	–	$123,757.24
Total rejected ballots					
Turnout			65.62	-3.71	
Registered voters		96,317			
Conservative hold		Swing		+0.31	
Source: Elections Canada

2019 Canadian federal election
Party	Candidate	Votes	%	±%	Expenditures
Conservative	Steven Blaney	32,283	50.09	-0.83	$56,210.72
Bloc Québécois	Sébastien Bouchard-Théberge	14,754	22.89	+11.36	$5,276.21
Liberal	Laurence Harvey	10,734	16.66	-4.05	$12,368.08
New Democratic	Chamroeun Khuon	3,256	5.05	-8.55	$3,070.83
Green	André Voyer	1,925	2.99	-0.26	none listed
People's	Marc Johnston	1,307	2.03	-	$0.00
Christian Heritage	Yves Gilbert	188	0.29	-	none listed
Total valid votes/expense limit		64,447	98.30	-1.70	-
Total rejected ballots		1,113	1.70	+0.81	
Turnout		65,560	69.33	+0.71	
Eligible voters		94,558			
Conservative hold		Swing		-6.10	
Source: Elections Canada

This renamed riding maintained its boundaries for the 42nd Canadian federal election:

2015 Canadian federal election
Party	Candidate	Votes	%	±%	Expenditures
Conservative	Steven Blaney	31,872	50.92	+6.97	$74,383.13
Liberal	Jacques Turgeon	12,961	20.71	+14.89	$20,553.28
New Democratic	Jean-Luc Daigle	8,516	13.6	-20.21	$11,888.30
Bloc Québécois	Antoine Dubé	7,217	11.53	-3.36	$17,164.62
Green	André Bélisle	2,032	3.25	+1.71	$85,188.63
Total valid votes/expense limit		62,598	98.70	+0.06	$235,171.98
Total rejected ballots		824	1.30	-0.06	
Turnout		63,422	68.62	+2.74	
Eligible voters		92,420			
Conservative hold		Swing		+13.7	
Source: Elections Canada

=== Lévis—Bellechasse, 2003 Representation Order ===
Graph of election results in Lévis—Bellechasse (minor parties that never got 2% of the vote or didn't run consistently are omitted)

2011 Canadian federal election
Party	Candidate	Votes	%	±%	Expenditures
Conservative	Steven Blaney	25,850	43.95	-1.95	$85,522.71
New Democratic	Nicole Laliberté	19,890	33.81	+22.97	$336.36
Bloc Québécois	Danielle-Maude Gosselin	8,757	14.89	-10.57	$44,495.06
Liberal	Francis Laforesterie	3,421	5.82	-9.24	$16,904.21
Green	Sacha Dougé	903	1.54	-1.00	-
Total valid votes/expense limit		58,821	98.64	+0.19	$94.740.90
Total rejected ballots		808	1.36	-0.19	
Turnout		59,629	65.88	+3.43	
Eligible voters		90,515			
Conservative hold		Swing		-12.46	

2008 Canadian federal election
Party	Candidate	Votes	%	±%	Expenditures
Conservative	Steven Blaney	24,785	45.90	-0.50	$66,280.10
Bloc Québécois	Guy Bergeron	13,747	25.46	-3.56	$18,536.02
Liberal	Pauline Côté	8,130	15.06	+6.87	$14,138.27
New Democratic	Gabriel Biron	5,856	10.84	+6.21	-
Green	Lynne Champoux-Williams	1,370	2.54	-1.56	-
Marxist–Leninist	Normand Fournier	113	0.21	-	-
Total valid votes/expense limit		54,001	98.45	-0.57	$90,335
Total rejected ballots		848	1.55	+0.57	
Turnout		54,849	62.45	-3.47	
Eligible voters		87,830			
Conservative hold		Swing		+1.53	

2006 Canadian federal election
Party	Candidate	Votes	%	±%	Expenditures
Conservative	Steven Blaney	25,940	46.40	+27.35	$59,351.14
Bloc Québécois	Réal Lapierre	16,223	29.02	-15.31	$61,706.32
Liberal	Shirley Baril	4,581	8.19	-19.43	$9,831.42
Independent	Normand Cadrin	4,275	7.65	-	$15,519.63
New Democratic	Éric Boucher	2,590	4.63	+0.77	$868.27
Green	Mathieu Castonguay	2,293	4.10	-0.69	$3,066.75
Total valid votes/expense limit		55,902	99.02	+1.24	$83,486
Total rejected ballots		551	0.98	-1.24	
Turnout		56,453	65.92	+6.31	
Eligible voters		85,635			
Conservative gain from Bloc Québécois		Swing		+21.33	

2004 Canadian federal election
Party	Candidate	Votes	%	±%	Expenditures
Bloc Québécois	Réal Lapierre	21,930	44.34	+3.64	$52,753,68
Liberal	Christian Jobin	13,664	27.62	-11.74	$61,102.89
Conservative	Gilles Vézina	9,425	19.05	+0.88	$14,913.30
Green	Sylvain Castonguay	2,372	4.80	-	$936.08
New Democratic	Louise Foisy	1,910	3.86	+2.49	-
Communist	Christophe Vaillancourt	163	0.33	-	$680.79
Total valid votes/expense limit		49,464	97.78	-	$81,813
Total rejected ballots		1,124	2.22	-	
Turnout		50,588	59.61	-3.51	
Eligible voters		84,867			
Bloc Québécois notional hold		Swing		+7.69	
Changes from 2000 are based on redistributed results. Change for the Conservatives is based on the totals of the Progressive Conservatives and the Canadian Alliance.

2000 federal election redistributed results
Party	Vote	%
Bloc Québécois	20,855	40.70
Liberal	20,166	39.36
Alliance	6,480	12.65
Progressive Conservative	2,828	5.52
New Democratic	701	1.37
Others	210	0.41

== See also ==
- List of Canadian electoral districts
- Historical federal electoral districts of Canada
