= Saint-Gervais, Quebec =

Saint-Gervais
- Municipality
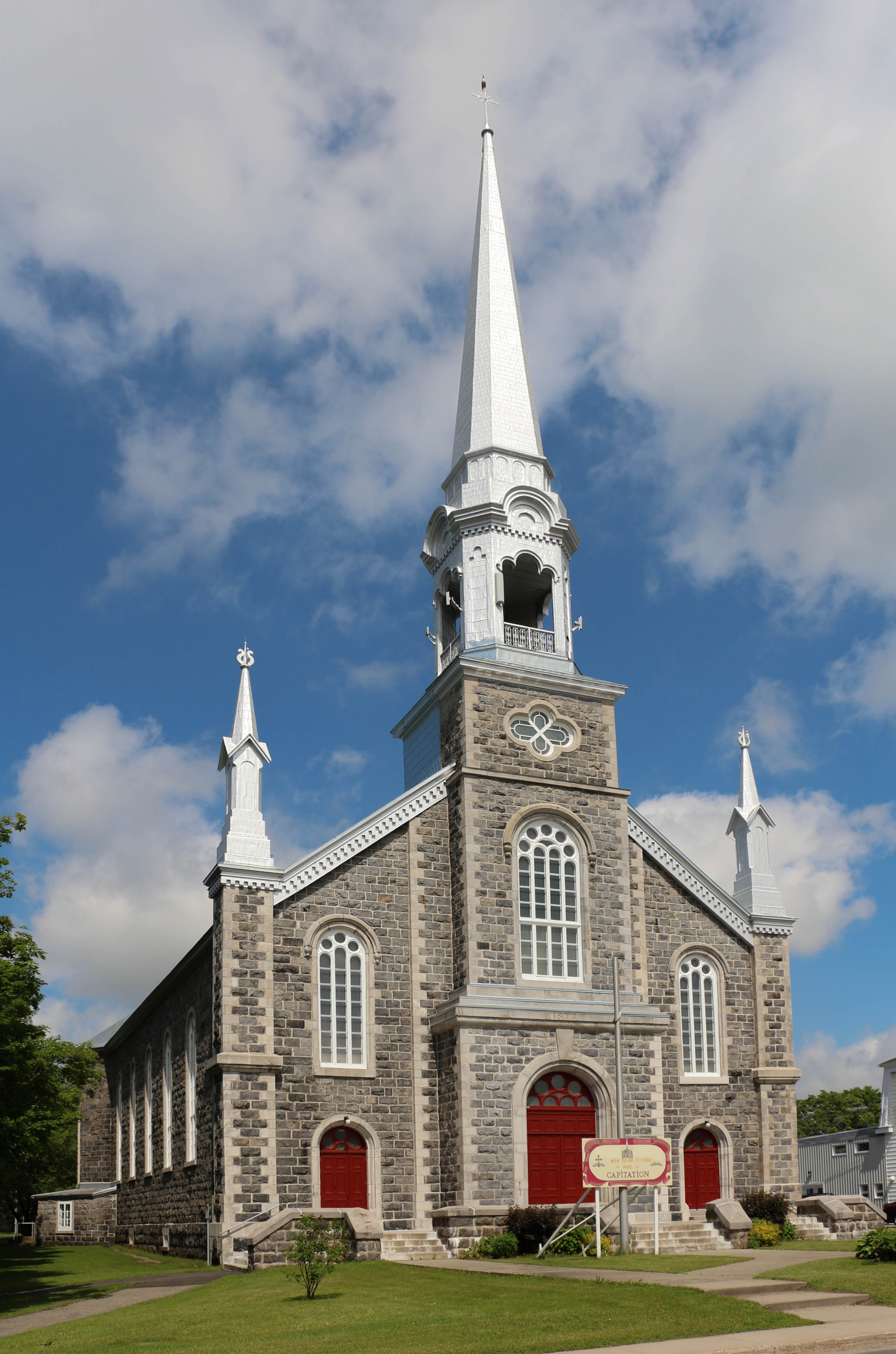

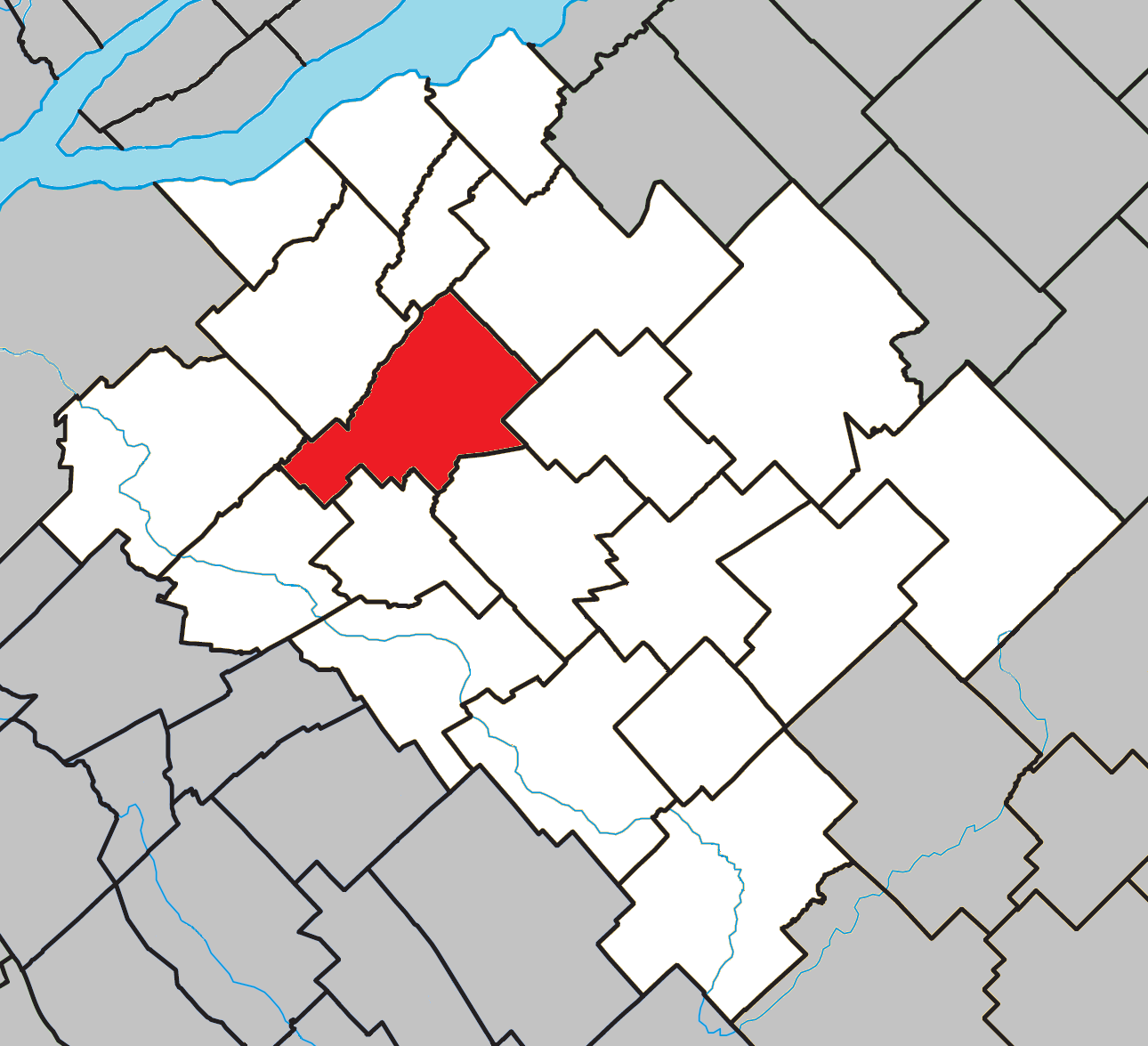
- Location within Bellechasse RCM.

- Location in province of Quebec.
- Coordinates: 46°43′N 70°53′W
- Country: Canada
- Province: Quebec
- Region: Chaudière-Appalaches
- RCM: Bellechasse
- Constituted: July 1, 1855

Government
  - Mayor: Gilles Nadeau
  - Federal riding: Bellechasse—Les Etchemins—Lévis
  - Prov. riding: Bellechasse

Area
  - Total: 90.00 km^{2} (34.75 sq mi)
  - Land: 89.33 km^{2} (34.49 sq mi)

Population (2021)
  - Total: 2,138
  - Density: 23.9/km^{2} (62/sq mi)
  - Pop 2016-2021: ▼0.7%
  - Dwellings: 896
- Time zone: UTC−5 (EST)
  - Summer (DST): UTC−4 (EDT)
- Postal code(s): G0R 3C0
- Area codes: 418 and 581
- Highways: R-279
- Website: www.saint-gervais.ca

Saint-Gervais (French pronunciation: [sɛ̃ ʒɛʁvɛ]) is a village of 2,100 people in the Bellechasse Regional County Municipality, part of the Chaudière-Appalaches administrative region of Quebec, Canada. It is named in honour of Gervasius, martyr with Protasius in the year 57.

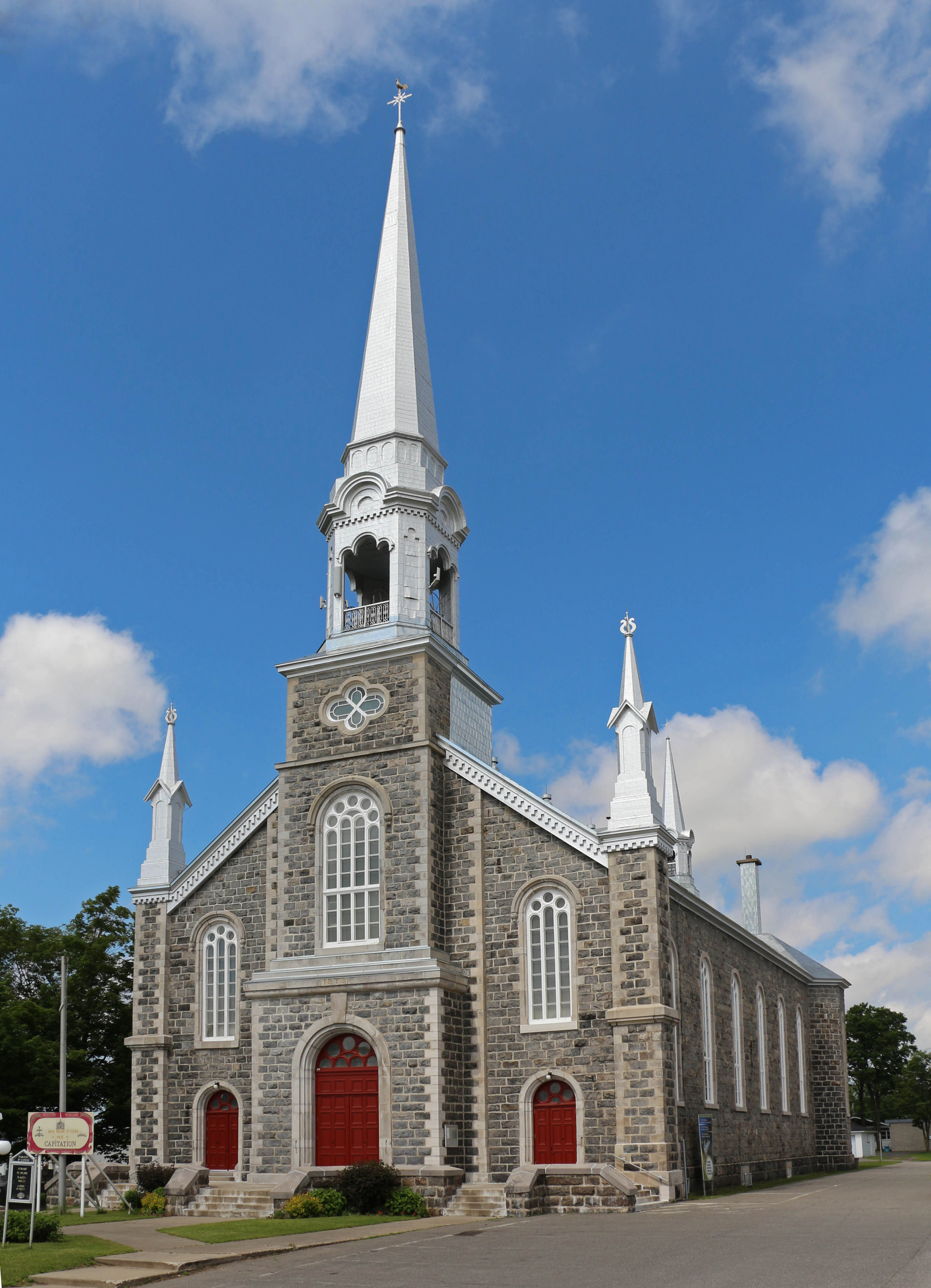
Saint-Gervais et Saint-Protais Church
