= Saint-Charles-de-Bellechasse =

- Municipality
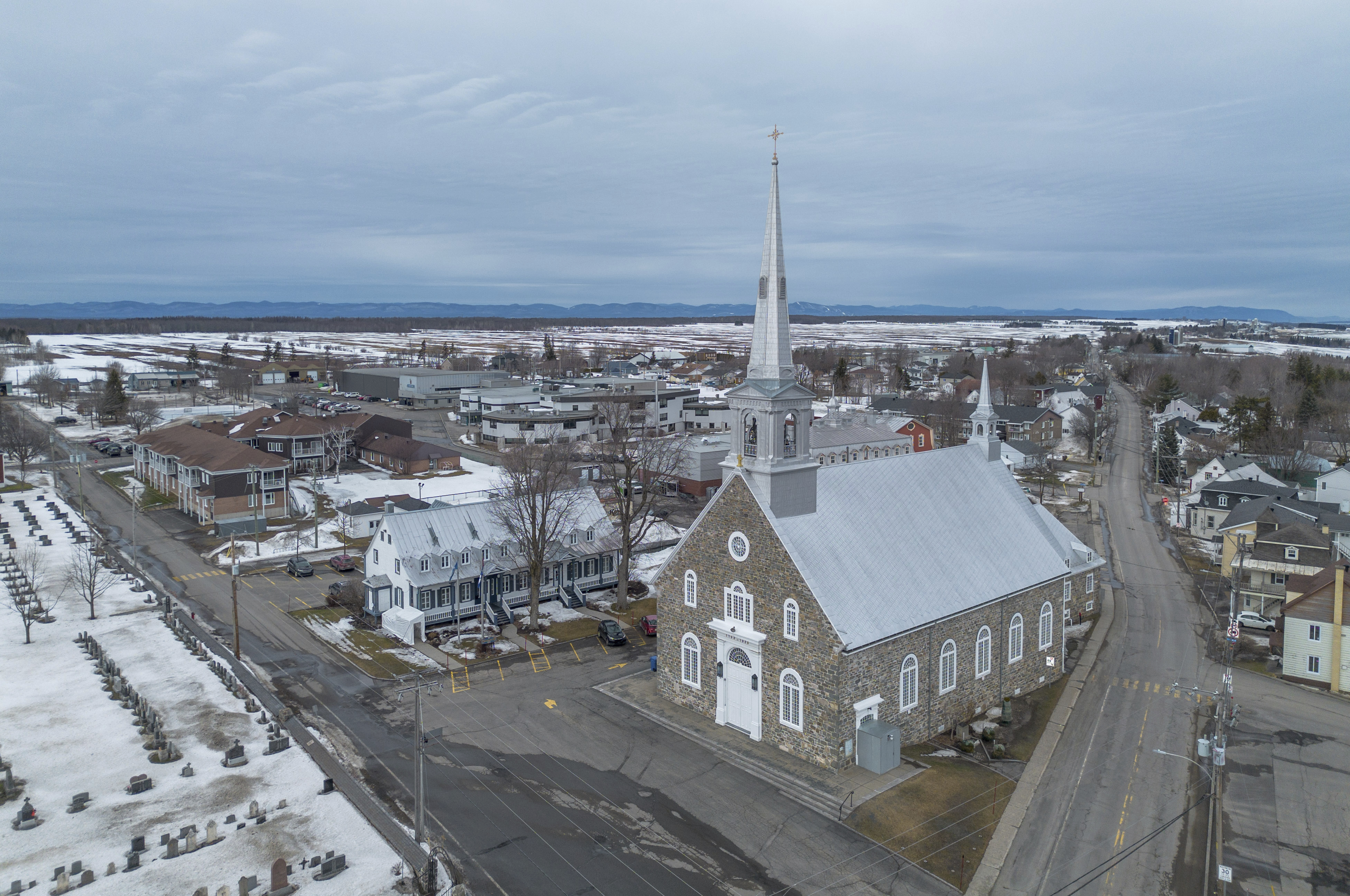
- Saint-Charles-de-Bellechasse in 2026

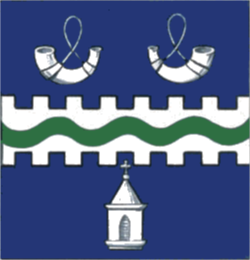
- Flag
- Motto: Ce qui sera est déjà (French for "What will be is already")
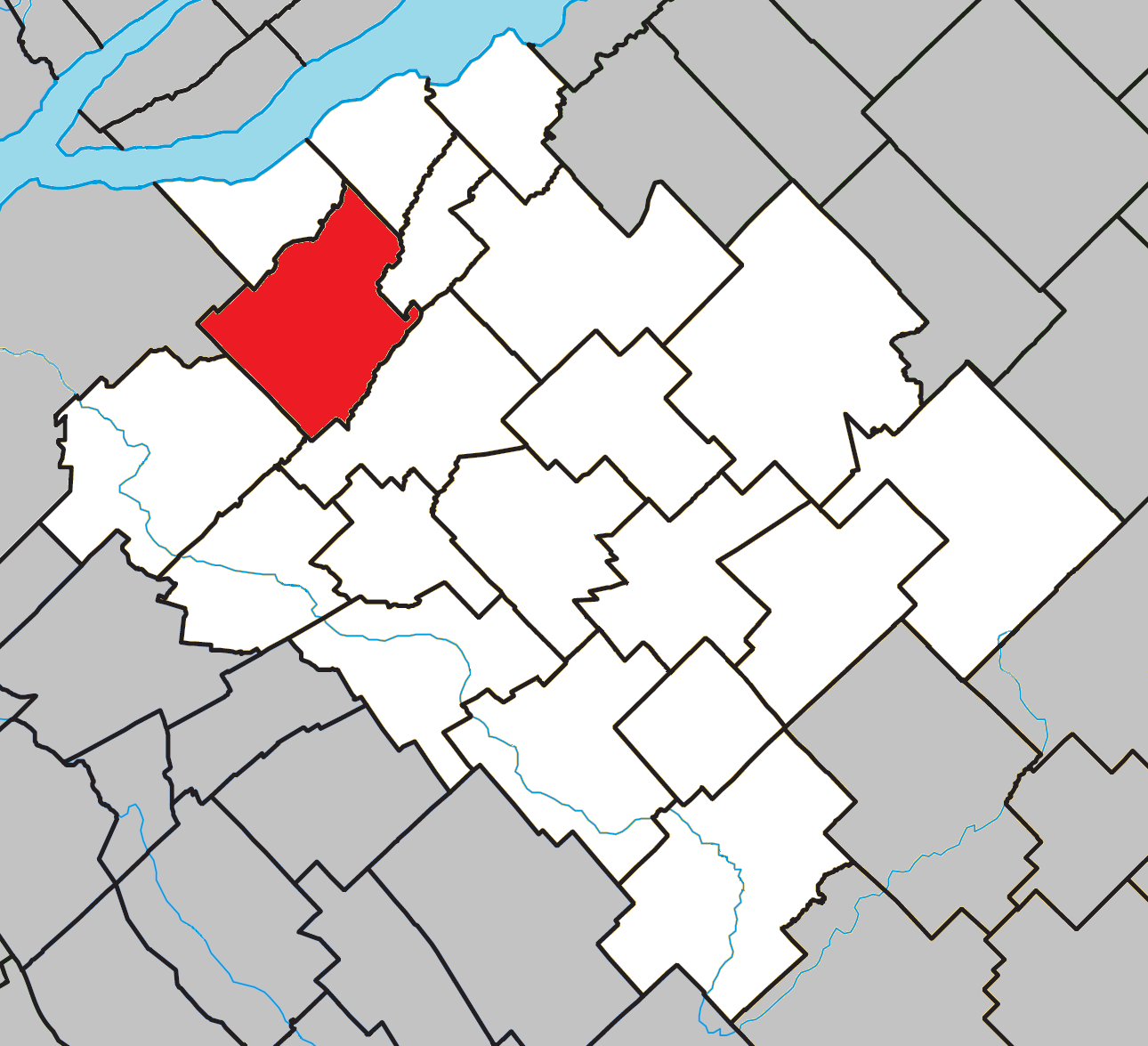
- Location within Bellechasse RCM.

- Location in province of Quebec.
- Coordinates: 46°46′N 70°57′W
- Country: Canada
- Province: Quebec
- Region: Chaudière-Appalaches
- RCM: Bellechasse
- Constituted: December 22, 1993

Government
  - Mayor: Pascal Rousseau
  - Federal riding: Bellechasse—Les Etchemins—Lévis
  - Prov. riding: Bellechasse

Area
  - Total: 94.70 km^{2} (36.56 sq mi)
  - Land: 93.30 km^{2} (36.02 sq mi)

Population (2021)
  - Total: 2,583
  - Density: 27.7/km^{2} (72/sq mi)
  - Pop 2016-2021: ▲7.8%
  - Dwellings: 1,121
- Time zone: UTC−5 (EST)
  - Summer (DST): UTC−4 (EDT)
- Postal code(s): G0R 2T0
- Area codes: 418 and 581
- Highways: R-218; R-279
- Website: www.saint-charles.ca

Saint-Charles-de-Bellechasse (French pronunciation: [sɛ̃ ʃaʁl də bɛlʃas]) is a village with a population of 2,583 (2021 Census), established about 20 kilometres (12 mi) southeast of Lévis in 1749, in the Bellechasse Regional County Municipality. Its total area is 93.30 square kilometres (36.02 sq mi) It is a rural community, with several notable businesses such as Meuble Idéal, Prodel (Cuisichef), BMR Avantis Saint-Charles-de-Bellechasse, Aliments Breton, Unicoop and many small enterprises. It is also the home of the École secondaire Saint-Charles high school.

The Boyer River, CN Railway, road 218 and road 279 cross the municipality. There are two small lakes inside the municipality, lakes St.Charles and part of lake Beaumont.

== Demographics ==
=== Population ===
Historical Census Data - Saint-Charles-de-Bellechasse, Quebec
Year	Pop.	±%
1996	2,197	—
2001	2,237	+1.8%
2006	2,159	−3.5%
2011	2,246	+4.0%
2016	2,396	+6.7%
2021	2,583	+7.8%
