= Bellechasse Regional County Municipality =

Bellechasse
- Regional county municipality
- Coordinates: 46°44′N 70°43′W
- Country: Canada
- Province: Quebec
- Region: Chaudière-Appalaches
- Effective: January 1, 1982
- County seat: Saint-Lazare-de-Bellechasse

Government
  - Type: Prefecture
  - Prefect: Hervé Blais

Area
  - Total: 1,781.50 km^{2} (687.84 sq mi)
  - Land: 1,751.06 km^{2} (676.09 sq mi)

Population (2016)
  - Total: 37,233
  - Density: 21.3/km^{2} (55/sq mi)
  - Change 2011-2016: ▲5.4%
  - Dwellings: 17,740
- Time zone: UTC−5 (EST)
  - Summer (DST): UTC−4 (EDT)
- Area codes: 418 and 581
- Website: www.mrcbellechasse.qc.ca

Bellechasse Regional County Municipality (French pronunciation: [bɛlʃas]) is a regional county municipality in the Chaudière-Appalaches region of Quebec. The county seat is Saint-Lazare-de-Bellechasse.

Saint-Lazare was chosen as the county seat because of its central location. Other municipalities, such as Saint-Anselme, Sainte-Claire, and Saint-Damien had wanted to be the county seat because of their larger population. The region belongs to the Bellechasse—Les Etchemins—Lévis federal electoral district.

== Subdivisions ==
There are 20 subdivisions within the RCM:

Municipalities (13)

- Armagh
- Beaumont
- Honfleur
- Saint-Anselme
- Saint-Charles-de-Bellechasse
- Saint-Gervais
- Saint-Henri
- Saint-Lazare-de-Bellechasse
- Saint-Michel-de-Bellechasse
- Saint-Nérée-de-Bellechasse
- Saint-Raphaël
- Saint-Vallier
- Sainte-Claire

Parishes (7)

- La Durantaye
- Notre-Dame-Auxiliatrice-de-Buckland
- Saint-Damien-de-Buckland
- Saint-Léon-de-Standon
- Saint-Malachie
- Saint-Nazaire-de-Dorchester
- Saint-Philémon

== Demographics ==
(Statistics Canada, 2016)

- Population: 37,233
- Population change (2011–2016): +5.4
- Dwellings: 17,740
- Area (km^{2}): 1,751.06
- Population Density (per km^{2}.): 21.3

== Transportation ==
=== Access Routes ===
Highways and numbered routes that run through the municipality, including external routes that start or finish at the county border:

- Autoroutes
  - A-20 (TCH)
- Principal Highways
  - R-132
  - R-173
- Secondary Highways
  - R-216
  - R-218
  - R-228
  - R-275
  - R-277
  - R-279
  - R-281
- External Routes
  - None

== Attractions ==
- Beaumont Mill, 1821 (Beaumont)
- Ferme Appalaches Safari Ranch (Saint-Lazare)
- Gold Museum (Saint-Philémon)
- Horse-drawn carriages Museum (Saint-Vallier)
- Le Ricaneux Artisanal Wine (Saint-Charles)
- Massif du Sud Ski Area (Saint-Philémon)
- Notre-Dame-de-Perpetual-Secours Historical Centre (Saint-Damien-de-Buckland)

== Protected Areas ==
- Massif du Sud Regional Park
- St-Vallier National Migratory Bird Sanctuary

== See also ==
- List of regional county municipalities and equivalent territories in Quebec
- Sisters of Our Lady of Perpetual Help, Bellechasse
