= Quebec Route 279 =

Highway in Quebec, Canada

Route 279

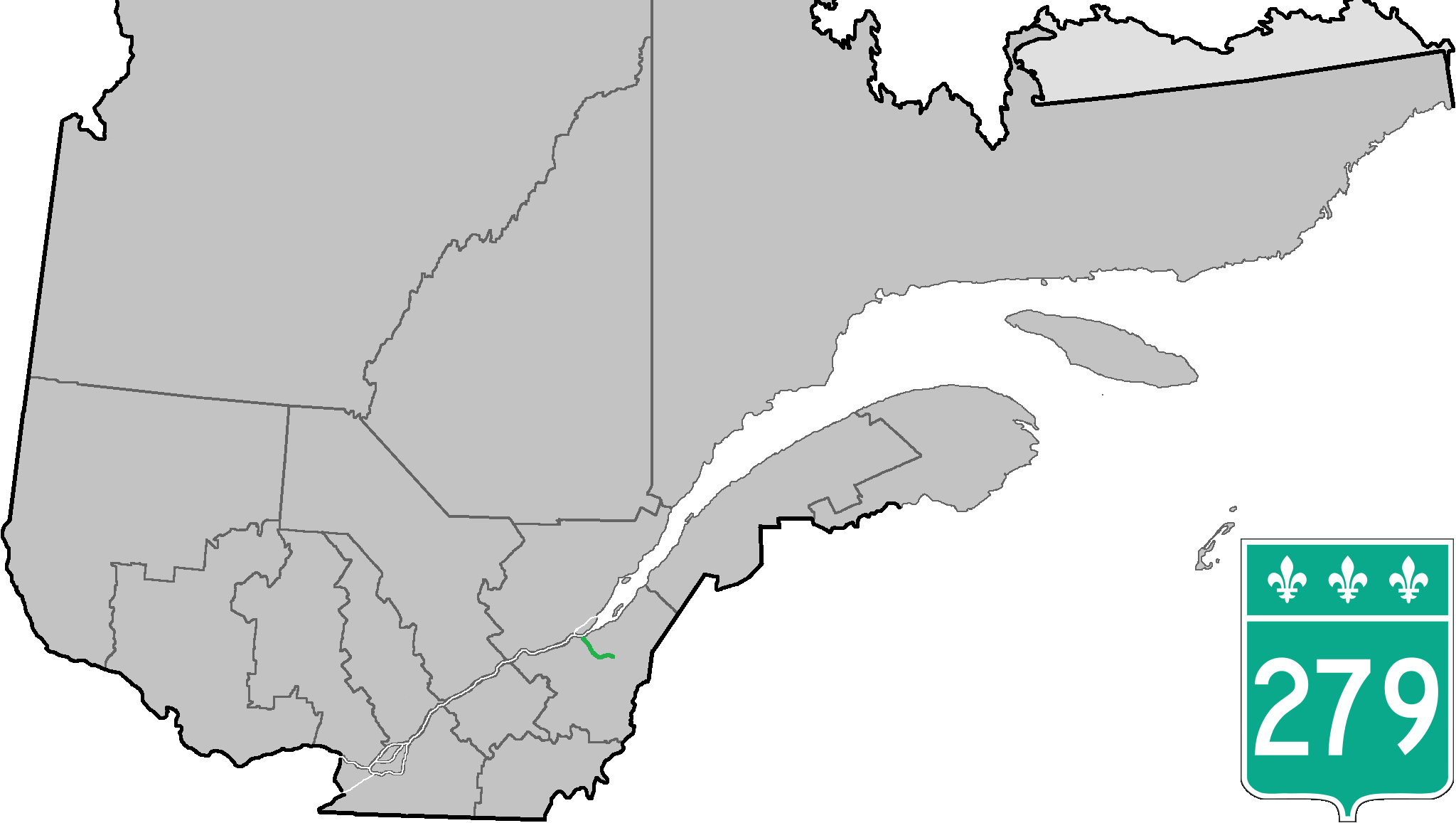

Route information
- Length: 48 km (30 mi)

Major junctions
- North end: R-132 near Beaumont
- A-20 (TCH) near Beaumont
- South end: R-216 near Buckland

Location
- Country: Canada
- Province: Quebec
- Major cities: Saint-Charles-de-Bellechasse

Highway system
- Quebec provincial highways; Autoroutes; List; Former
← R-277	→ R-281

Route 279 is a 48 km two-lane north-south highway in Quebec, Canada, which starts in Beaumont at the junction of Route 132 and ends in Notre-Dame-Auxiliatrice-de-Buckland at the junction of Route 216. The road goes through the Grande Plée Bleue between Beaumont and Saint-Charles-de-Bellechasse, crosses the Boyer River in St-Charles, and slowly goes up the Appalachian Mountains.

== Towns along Route 279 ==
- Beaumont
- Saint-Charles-de-Bellechasse
- Saint-Gervais
- Saint-Lazare-de-Bellechasse
- Saint-Damien-de-Buckland
- Buckland
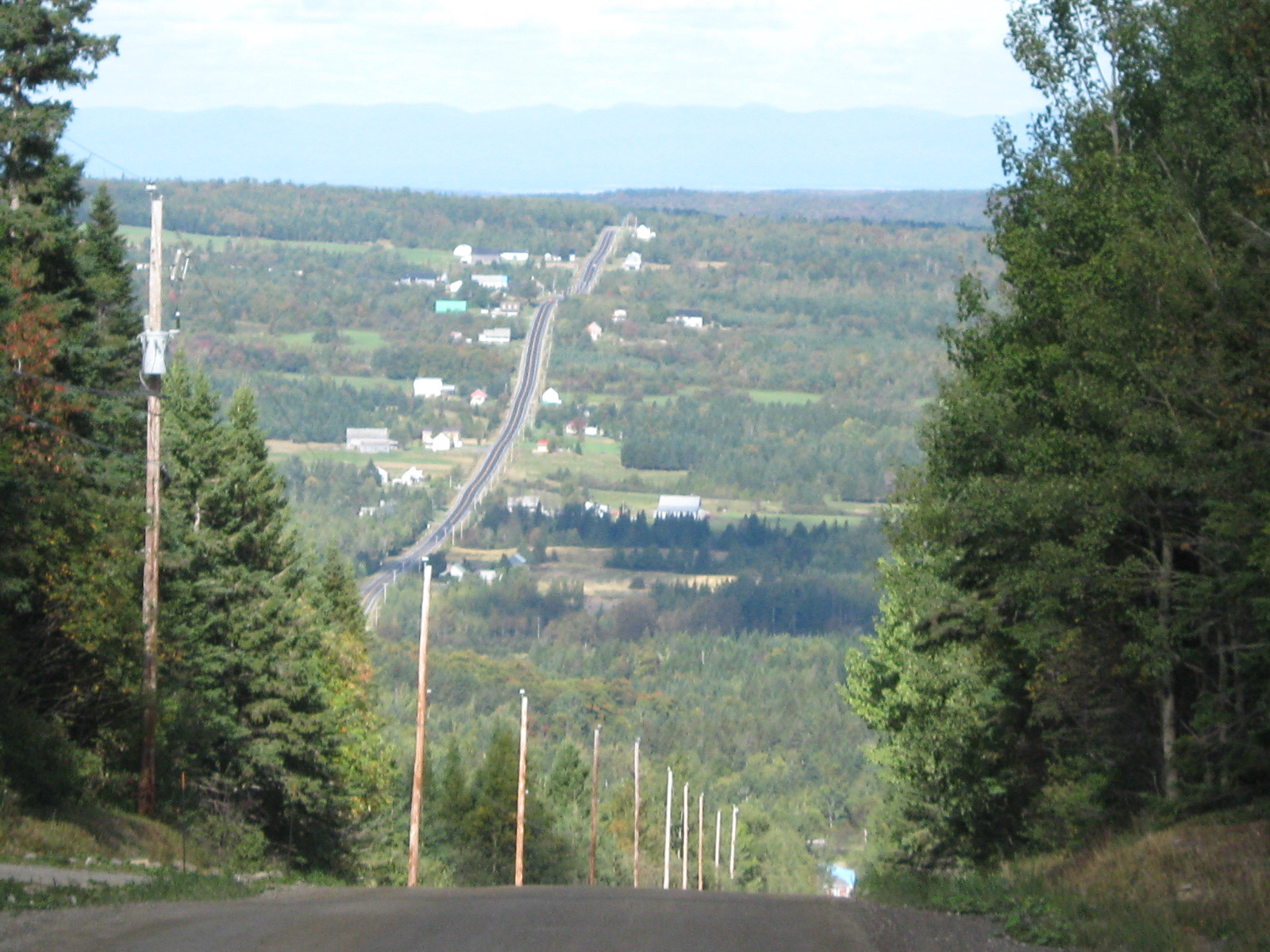
Route 279 climbs appalachian hills near Notre-Dame-Auxiliatrice-de-Buckland.

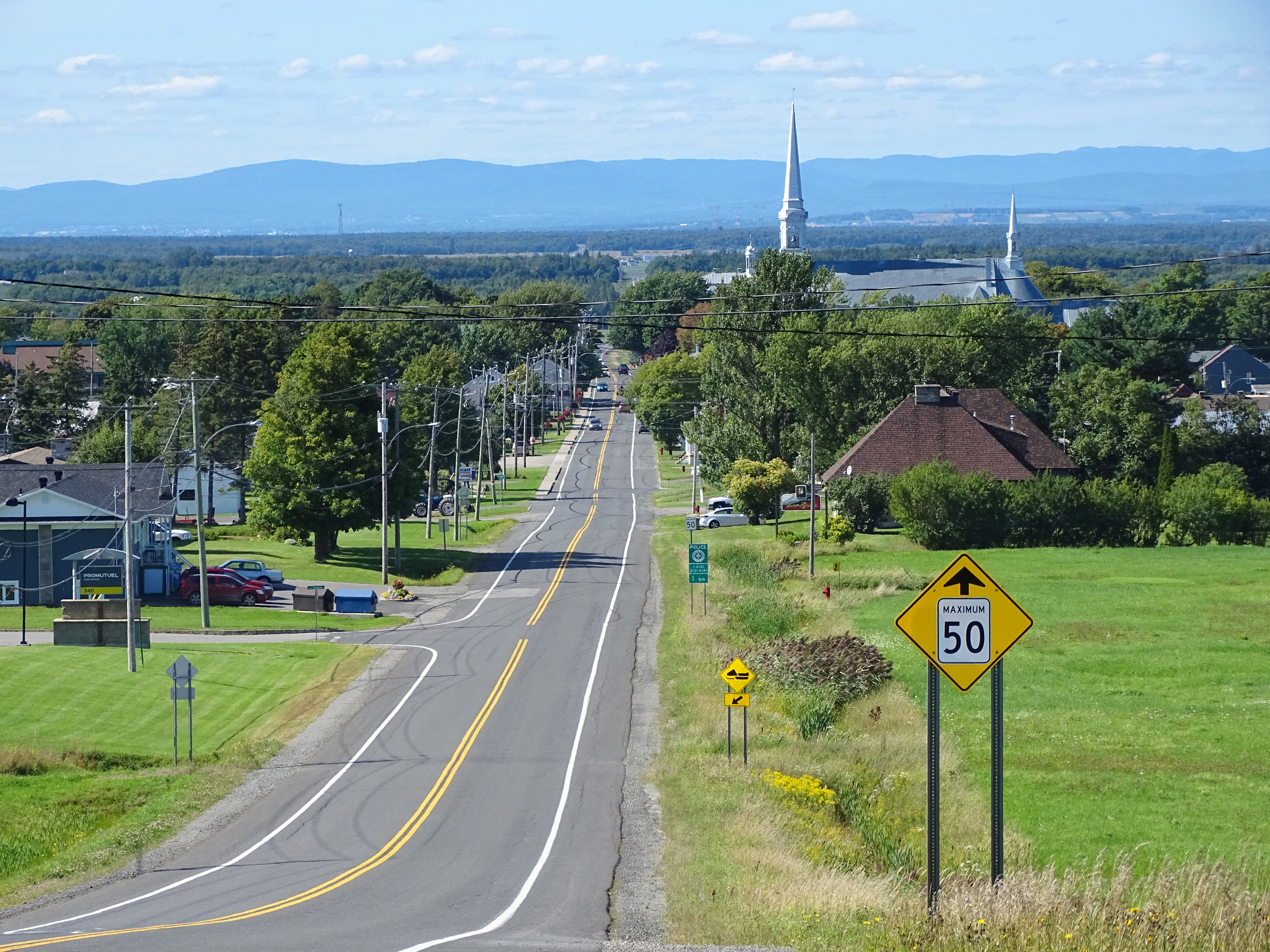
Quebec Route 279 at Saint-Gervais.

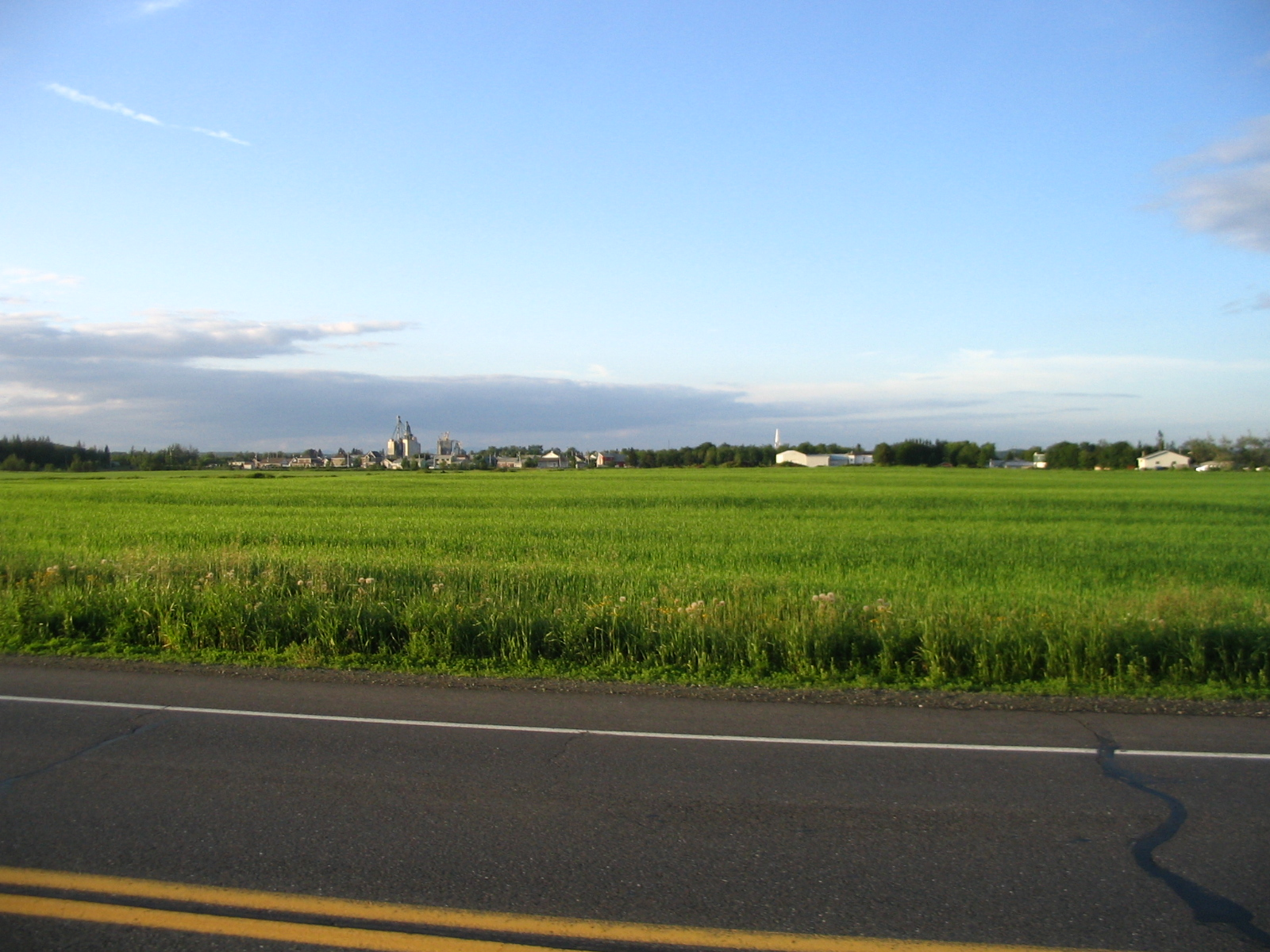
Route 279 in Saint-Charles,

== See also ==
- List of Quebec provincial highways
