= Boyer River (Iowa) =

River in Iowa, U.S.

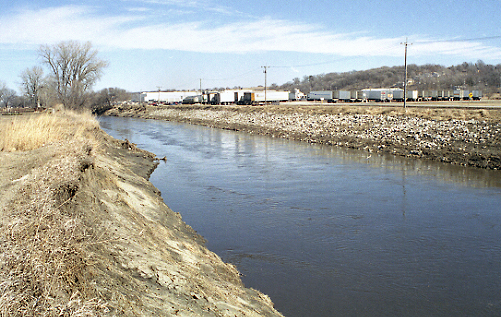
- The Boyer River at Denison

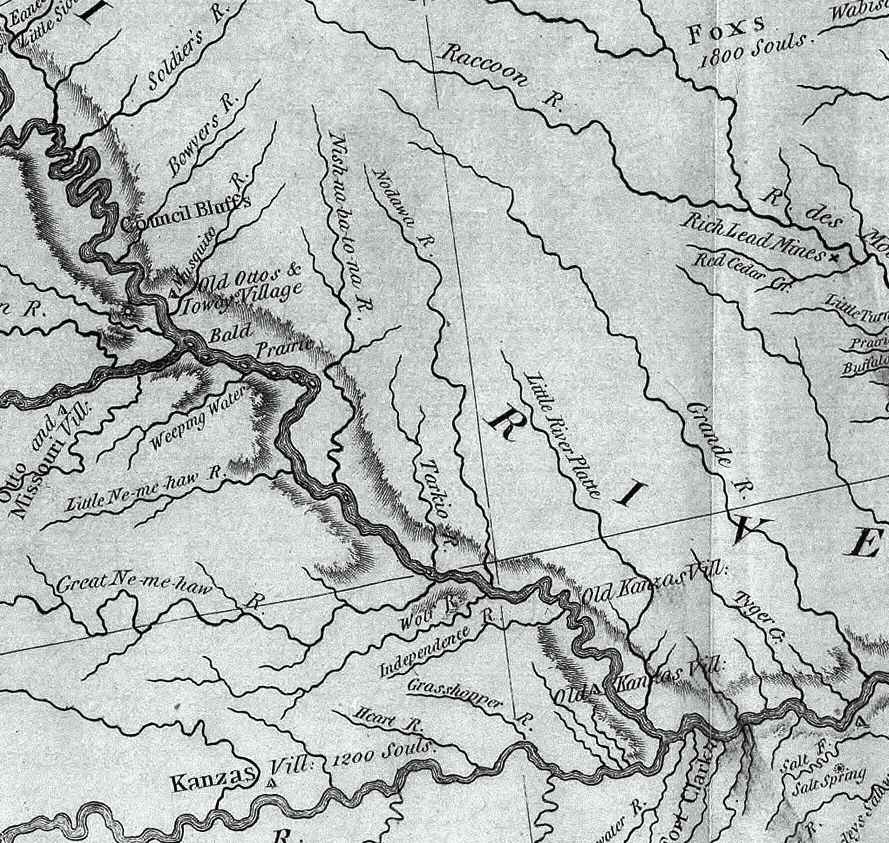
- This excerpt from the Lewis and Clark map of 1814 that shows the rivers of southwest Iowa, southeast Nebraska, and northwest Missouri. "Bowyer's River" is seen at upper left.

Location
- Country: United States
- State: Iowa

Physical characteristics
- Source
  - coordinates: 42°30′05″N 95°16′32″W
- Mouth: Missouri River
  - coordinates: 41°27′11″N 95°55′09″W
  - elevation: 971 ft (296 m)
- Length: 118 miles (190 km)
- Discharge
  - location: Logan, Iowa
  - average: 411 cu/ft. per sec.

The Boyer River is a tributary of the Missouri River, 118 miles (190 km) long, in western Iowa in the United States. Most reaches of the river's course have been straightened and channelized.

The Boyer River is named for a settler who hunted and trapped in the watershed before the time of Lewis and Clark. Explorers, including Lewis and Clark, John James Audubon, and Prince Maximilian zu Wied-Neuwied, navigated through the region near the mouth of the Boyer as they traveled up the Missouri River. This area is now part of the Boyer Chute National Wildlife Refuge (NWR). This was originally an island of sand and sediment deposited in the Missouri River by the Boyer River. Gradually, the Missouri River eroded a major channel (chute) through the sediment; this came to be known as Boyer Chute, and was the preferred channel used by explorers and traders until the Missouri eventually changed its course.

== See also ==
- List of Iowa rivers
- Tributaries of the Missouri River
