= Saint-Henri, Chaudière-Appalaches, Quebec =

Saint-Henri
- Municipality
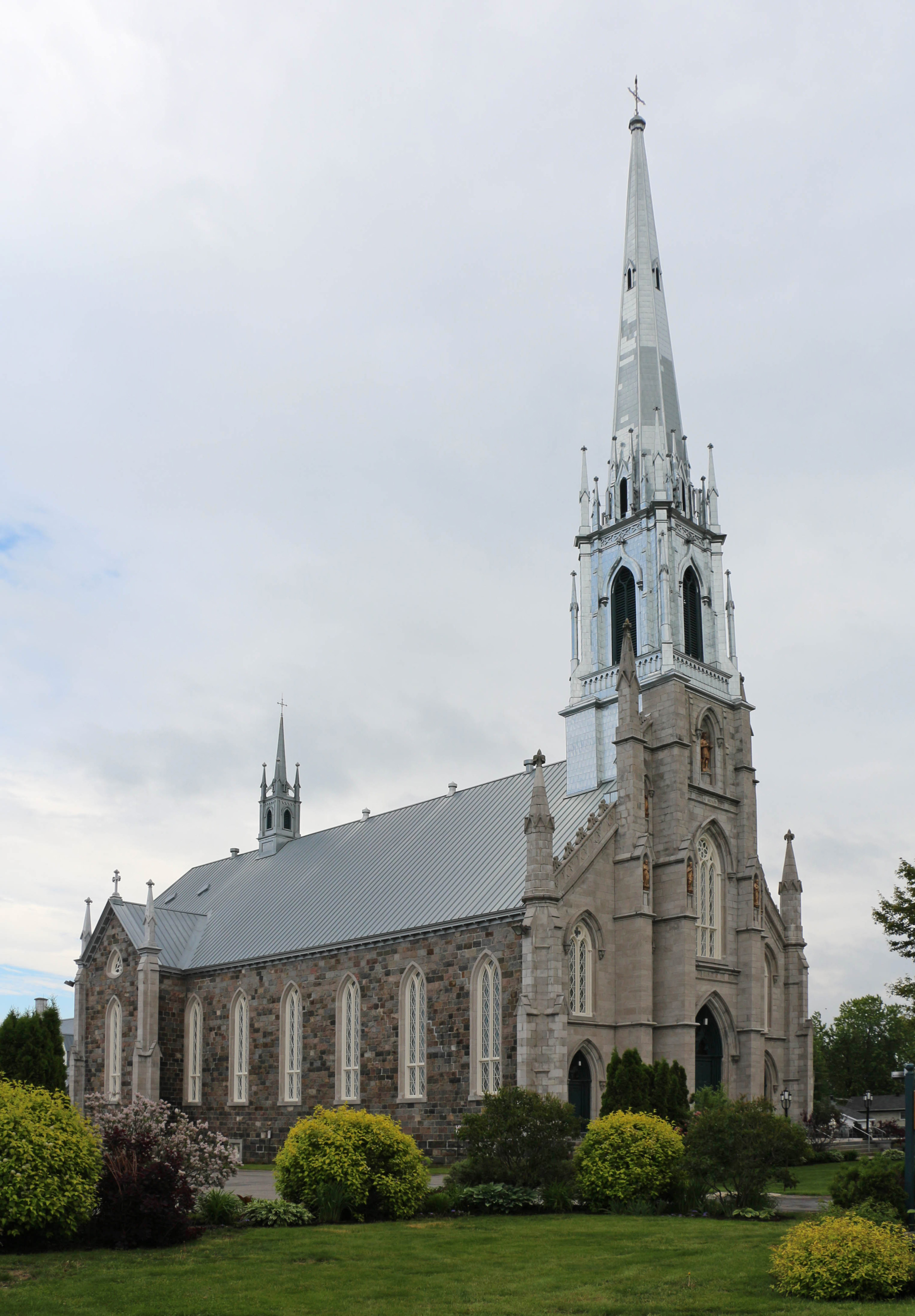
- Saint-Henri Church

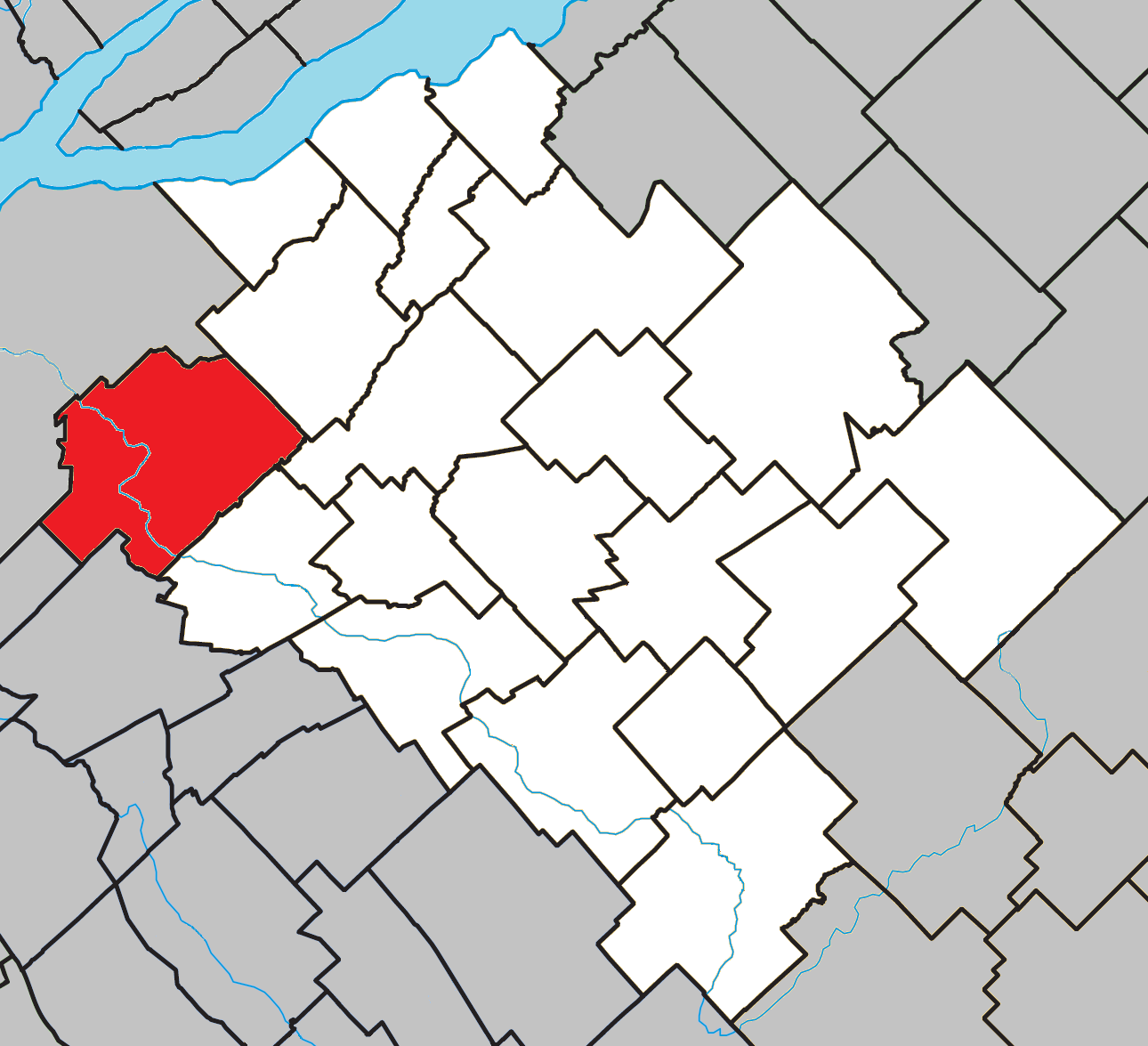
- Location within Bellechasse RCM.

- Location in province of Quebec.
- Coordinates: 46°42′N 71°04′W
- Country: Canada
- Province: Quebec
- Region: Chaudière-Appalaches
- RCM: Bellechasse
- Constituted: October 9, 1976

Government
  - Mayor: Germain Caron
  - Federal riding: Bellechasse—Les Etchemins—Lévis
  - Prov. riding: Bellechasse

Area
  - Total: 124.20 km^{2} (47.95 sq mi)
  - Land: 122.57 km^{2} (47.32 sq mi)

Population (2016)
  - Total: 5,611
  - Density: 45.8/km^{2} (119/sq mi)
  - Pop 2011-2016: ▲11.7%
  - Dwellings: 2,365
- Time zone: UTC−5 (EST)
  - Summer (DST): UTC−4 (EDT)
- Postal code(s): G0R 3E0
- Area codes: 418 and 581
- Highways: R-173; R-218; R-275; R-277
- Website: www.municipalite. saint-henri.qc.ca

Saint-Henri (French pronunciation: [sɛ̃ ɑ̃ʁi]) is a municipality of 5,611 people, 20 km south of Lévis, in the Bellechasse Regional County Municipality of Quebec, Canada. It is sometimes known as Saint-Henri-de-Lévis, and was historically known as Saint-Henri-de-Lauzon.

It used to belong to the former Desjardins Regional County Municipality, but decided to join Bellechasse in 2000 when the new city of Lévis was created. Saint-Henri felt it did not belong with a mostly urban RCM, and would fit better with Bellechasse, which has a largely rural base. Now, Saint-Henri is the biggest town in this RCM, followed by Saint-Anselme and Sainte-Claire. The Etchemin River crosses the municipality and one hydroelectric dam is found in Saint-Henri. On November 6, 1775, Benedict Arnold is said to have visited the village on his way to attack Quebec City. The largest local business is Olymel, a meat processing factory.

== Demographics ==
=== Population ===
Canada census – Saint-Henri community profile

	2016	2011
Population	5,611 (+11.7% from 2011)	5,023 (+22.7% from 2006)
Land area	122.57 km^{2} (47.32 sq mi)	122.29 km^{2} (47.22 sq mi)
Population density	45.8/km^{2} (119/sq mi)	41.1/km^{2} (106/sq mi)
Median age	37.0 (M: 37.3, F: 36.7)	36.4 (M: 36.5, F: 36.1)
Private dwellings	2,365 (total)	2,145 (total)
Median household income	$73,244	$62,174

References: 2016 2011
