= Villeray, Montreal =

Villeray
- Neighbourhood
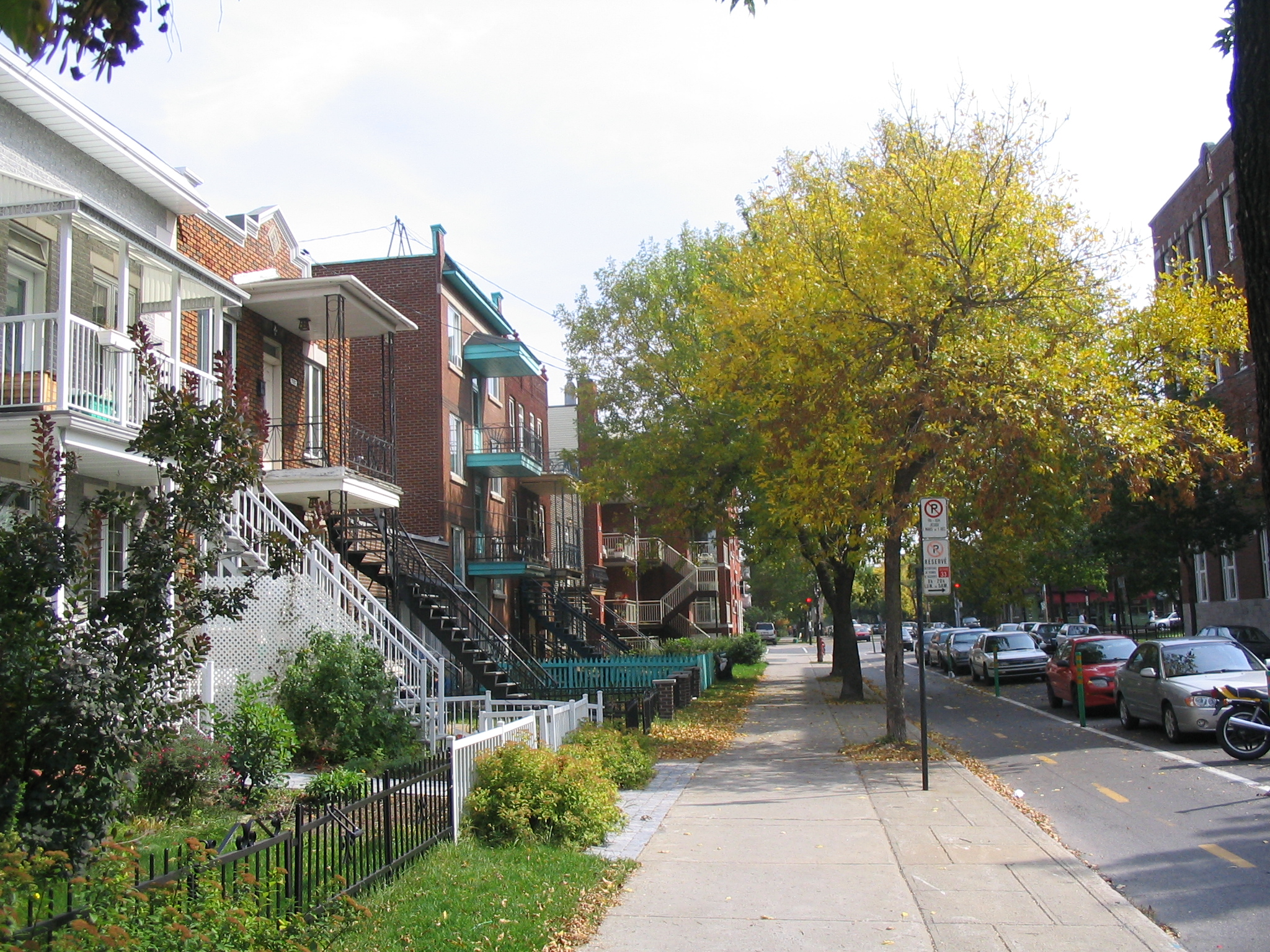
- Bicycle path on Boyer Street in Villeray.

- Location of Villeray in Montreal
- Coordinates: 45.540143°N 73.627882°W
- Country: Canada
- Province: Quebec
- City: Montreal
- Borough: Villeray-Saint-Michel-Parc-Extension
- Postal Code: H2E, H2P, H2R
- Area codes: 514, 438

Villeray (French pronunciation: [vilʁɛ]) is a neighbourhood in Montreal, Quebec, Canada. It is part of the Villeray–Saint-Michel–Parc-Extension borough and is situated in the north-central part of the Island of Montreal.

== Origin of the name ==
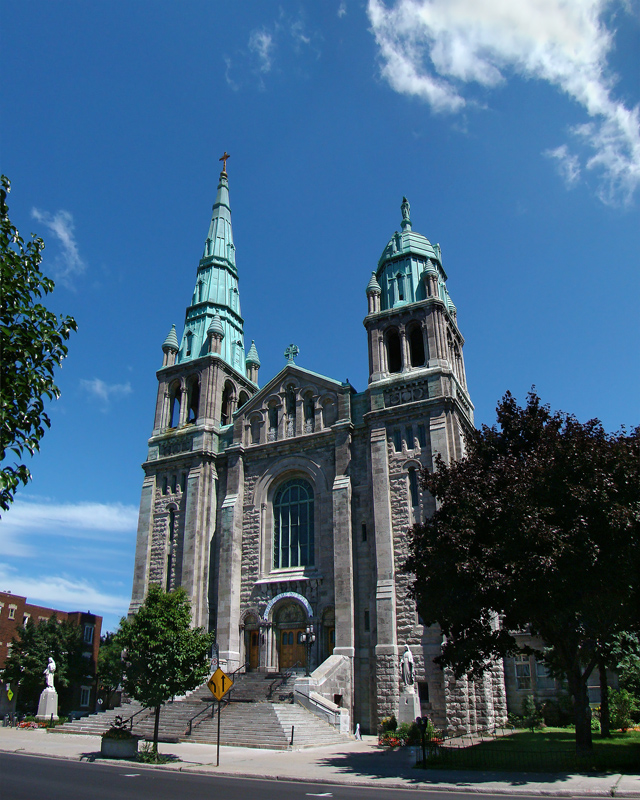
Church of Notre-Dame-du-Saint-Rosaire

The village of Villeray took its name from Louis Rouer de Villeray (1628–1700), who held various positions in the French regime. It became a town in 1896, before which the area had been farmland. When it was annexed to Montreal in 1905, its population was 800. At the time, Villeray was surrounded by quarries that provided material for the construction of many of the buildings in the area, as well as for several of the city's major landmarks. For some years, its inhabitants were chiefly stone workers, farmers and owners of small businesses.

== Geography ==
The territory of Villeray was well provided with streams and ponds and very amenable to cultivation. The original Jarry Farm covered 64 arpents (approximately 22 hectares, or 54 acres) and stretched as far north as the present-day Metropolitan (highway 40), south to Villeray St., east to St-Hubert and west to Foucher. The owner, one Stanislas Jarry, broke the land up into 680 lots at the beginning of the 20th century. Other members of his family owned land in what would eventually be called Villeray–Saint-Michel–Parc-Extension.

Presently the district of Villeray is enclosed between Avenue Casgrain in the west, Boulevard Jean-Talon in the south, Rue Garnier in the east and the Metropolitan (highway 40) to the north. These borders were determined in the creation of the borough of Villeray–Saint-Michel–Parc-Extension, which was created on January 1, 2002, following the municipal reorganization of Montreal.

== A burst of development at the beginning of the 20th century ==
Originally Villeray's houses were wooden ones, typically owned by workers, with sheds and stables in back. From 1915 to 1930, Villeray saw a boom which brought with it the need for schools, churches, a public bath and a fire station, built at the corner of Jarry and St-Hubert in 1912.

The imposing Montreal Institute for the Deaf, with a façade made of Montreal stone, was built near Faillon and de Castelnau during World War I by the Clercs de Saint-Viateur.

== Post World War II ==
After World War II the typical Montreal duplex and triplex became the standard domestic architecture in Villeray, and the town filled up with rows of these buildings, whose spiral front staircases, back alleys, clotheslines and sheds are well-known features of residential Montreal.

== Raoul Jarry ==
Raoul Jarry, Montreal city councillor from 1921 and member of its executive committee from 1924, saw in Jarry Park a means of offering some open green space to fight the diseases that spread among children in summertime and to encourage them to participate in sports and families to picnic and relax together. It was due to his efforts that the city purchased the land, which had up till then been leased from the corporation of its original owner, Stanley Clark Bagg (memorialized by Bagg Street further south in Plateau Mont-Royal). Raoul Jarry died in 1930 and the park is named after him (Jarry Street is named after Bernard Bleignier dit Jarry, an 18th-century landlord from whom Jarry was descended. His brother Henri (1893-1961) would become an alderman for Villeray from 1934 to 1938.

== 21st century ==
The 21st century is seeing more and more people moving into Villeray. Attracting them to the area is its somewhat central location on the Island of Montreal, its access to Metro stations, its proximity to Jean Talon Market and Little Italy, and it is relatively close to shopping areas like Rockland Center and Marché Central. Along with the revitalization of Jarry Park, the area is increasingly more popular compared to the 1990s. This in turn, along with the new Université de Montréal campus in the neighbouring Park Extension, has caused gentrification issues to affect the area gradually and steadily since around 2010.

== See also ==
- Jarry Park
- Jarry Park Stadium
- List of former municipalities in Quebec
