= Saint-Viateur =

Saint-Viateur or variant may refer to:

- Saint Viateur, or Viator of Lyons
- the Viatorian order, Clercs Saint Viateur or Clerics of Saint Viator
- Saint-Cuthbert, Quebec
- Clercs-Saint-Viateur, Quebec
- Saint-Viateur d'Outremont Church, in Montreal
- St-Viateur Bagel, in Montreal
- St. Viateur's Academy, in Illinois
