= Brothers of Our Lady of the Fields =

The Brothers of Our Lady of the Fields (Frères de Notre Dame des Champs) were a small Canadian Roman Catholic congregation active between 1902 and 1930.

== History ==
Joseph-Onésime Brousseau became curé at St-Damien de Buckland in 1882. It was a small, poor, rural parish. In 1892, he built a convent-hospital to shelter orphans and the elderly and founded the Congrégation des sœurs de Notre-Dame du Perpétuel Secours to staff it.

In order to counter the exodus of French-Canadian settlers to the industrialized regions of the United States, projects were developed by the Colonization Society of the Diocese of Quebec. Brousseau saw this as a method to support the French-Canadian Catholic culture in Quebec, and joined the movement. Having grown up on a farm, he saw improved agricultural practices and the encouragement of small businesses as a means to improve the quality of life in his parish.

With his father, Brousseau cultivated the land owned by the parish church and developed a model farm. He gave lectures on agricultural, and contributed to the establishment of an aqueduct, a butter factory and a sawmill. In 1899, the Archbishop of Quebec relieved him of his parochial responsibilities and appointed him agricultural missionary.

Brousseau envisioned a system whereby upon reaching the age of twelve, the boys cared for in the orphanages run by the sisters would move on to an agricultural training facility, and the girls would learn various domestic skills. Upon graduating, it was expected that the boys could apply for an allocation of land from the government.

To this end, in 1902 Brousseau founded the Brothers of Our Lady of the Fields. Their purpose was to train orphans in industrial and agricultural pursuits. In 1905 their building was destroyed by fire. Although reconstruction began in 1906, it was not rebuilt until 1911. The congregation failed to flourish as Brousseau had desired; at its peak it only had six brothers and four novices.

In 1931, Bishop Georges Courchesne of Rimouski merged the Brothers of Our Lady of the Fields with the Clerics of St Viator.

== See also ==
- Sisters of Notre Dame of Perpetual Help, a sister congregation founded in 1892 by Brousseau
