= Jacques Berthelet =

Canadian Roman Catholic bishop (1934–2019)

Jacques Berthelet CSV
- Bishop of Saint-Jean–Longueuil
- Church: Catholic Church
- Diocese: Diocese of Saint-Jean–Longueuil
- In office: 27 December 1996 – 28 October 2010
- Predecessor: Bernard Hubert
- Successor: Lionel Gendron
- Previous posts: Titular Bishop of Lamsorti (1986-1996); Auxiliary Bishop of Diocese of Saint-Jean–Longueuil (1986-1996); Superior General of the Clerics of Saint Viator (1984-1986)

Orders
- Ordination: 16 June 1962 by Léo Blais
- Consecration: 21 March 1987 by Bernard Hubert

Personal details
- Born: 24 August 1934 Montreal, Quebec, Dominion of Canada, British Empire
- Died: 25 January 2019 (aged 84) Joliette, Quebec, Canada

Jacques Berthelet (24 October 1934 – 25 January 2019) was a Canadian Roman Catholic bishop.

Berthelet was born in Canada and was ordained to the priesthood in 1962. He was Superior General of the Clerics of Saint Viator from 1984 to 1986. He served as titular bishop of Lamsorti and as auxiliary bishop of the Roman Catholic Diocese of Saint-Jean-Longueuil, Canada, from 1986 to 1996 and then as bishop of the diocese from 1996 to 2010.
