= Louis Querbes =

French priest, founder of the Clerics of Saint Viator (1793–1859)

Venerable Jean-Louis-Marie-Joseph Querbes CSV
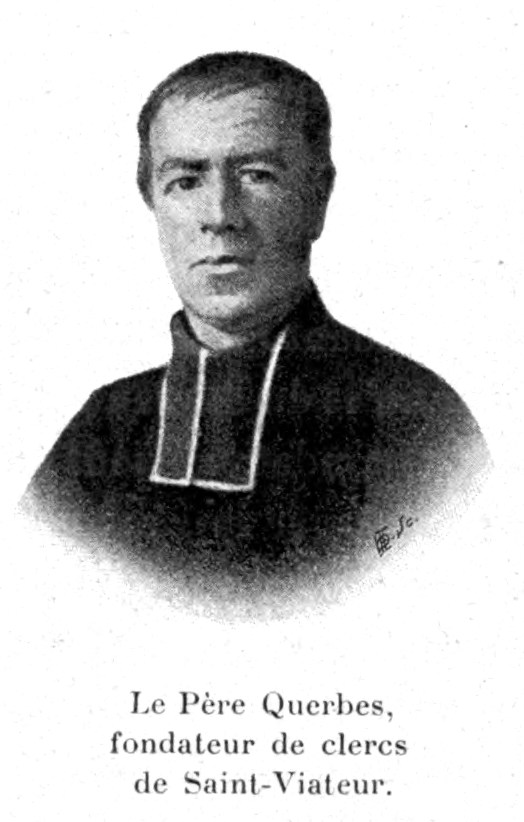
- Born: 21 August 1793; Lyon, Rhône, French First Republic
- Died: 1 September 1859 (aged 66); Vourles, Rhône, Second French Empire
- Venerated in: Catholic Church
- Attributes: Priest's cassock
- Patronage: Clerics of Saint Viator

Louis Querbes (21 August 1793 – 1 September 1859) was a Catholic priest in France who founded the Clerics of Saint Viator (CSV), a religious order which specializes in teaching.

== Life ==
Louis-Joseph Marie Querbes (often pronounced in English as "curbs", although in French it is "kerb" with a rolled "r") was born in Lyon, France, on August 21, 1793 in the midst of the French Revolution. The next day a bomb destroyed his home. His father had been a peasant, who migrated to Lyon to work as a tailor. Louis attended the parish school of St. Nizier, and 1812 the seminary of St. Irenaeus. Classmates included John Vianney, Jean-Claude Colin, and Marcellin Champagnat. Unable to enter the Society of Jesus (which was not restored until 1814, he was ordained a member of the secular clergy on December 17, 1816. He was first assigned to his home parish of Saint-Nizier. In 1822 he was named pastor of St. Bonnet in Vourles, a village of Vourles near Lyon, where he remained until his death. In the wake of the French Revolution there was much social confusion and disorder, and few schools left open outside the large cities.

In Vourles, between 1826 and 1831, he developed the basis of an association of catechists who would take charge of the Christian education of children and related tasks. Desirous of securing teachers for his own and for neighbouring parishes, Querbes established at Vourles as early as 1829 a school for the training of lay teachers, which was soon officially sanctioned by the Royal Council of Public Instruction.

== Clerics of Saint Viator ==
Querbes founded the CSV in 1831 in Vourles (Rhône). He chose as a patron, Viator, a local saint who lived in the fourth century and was revered by the people of Lyon as a model of youth. The order received papal approval in 1838.

Under the leadership of Querbes the membership of the community increased so rapidly that before the time of his death there existed more than 200 Catechists of Saint Viator in France; and besides teaching in many parochial schools, and a school for the deaf, the clerics conducted colleges, schools of agriculture, and a publishing house from which were issued a large number of practical school classics and educational magazines such as "L'Ecole et la Famille".

In 1847, at the request of Bishop Bourget of Montreal, Querbes sent teachers to staff a small college in Joliette, Quebec.

Suffering from diabetes, Louis Querbes died 1 September 1, 1859.

== Legacy ==
The Canons of Saint Viator continue to serve in many locations around the globe. A number of educational facilities are named in his honor. The park behind the cathedral in Joliette, Quebec is named after him.

== Beatification process ==
The Postulator for the Cause of Father Querbes, Msgr. Paolo Rizzi, has informed to Rev. Mick R. Egan, C.S.V., Superior General, that the ordinary session of Cardinals and Bishops, members of the Congregation for the Cause of Saints, met Oct. 1, 2019 in Rome. In that meeting they established that the Servant of God Louis Querbes lived in an uncommon but heroic degree all the virtues of faith, hope, charity, fortitude, justice, prudence, temperance, as well as the evangelical counsels. Therefore, on Oct. 2 Pope Francis authorized the Congregation for the Cause of Saints to promulgate the relevant decree in his name, declaring Father Louis Querbes Venerable. This announcement was made in Rome today, Oct. 3, 2019. The official decree on the heroic virtues of Father Querbes will be published in about 10 days and when we receive that decree it will be published for you. I know you join me in celebrating this wonderful news and thanking God for the example of Father Querbes’ life and witness. The decree by Pope Francis opens the way to beatification. However, for this we will need the recognition of a miracle through the intercession of Venerable Father Louis Querbes. Let us join our prayers in seeking the intercession of Father Querbes. The newspaper La Croix reported on February 27, 2006 that Cardinal Philippe Barbarin, archbishop of Lyon, had begun the process which might lead to the beatification of Querbes. Pope Francis named Fr. Querbes as Venerable on October 2, 2019.
