= Collège Champagneur =

Location
- 3713, rue Queen; Rawdon, Quebec; Canada
- Coordinates: 46.0443°N 73.710°W

Information
- Religious affiliation: Roman Catholic

Collège Champagneur is a private French-language Roman Catholic coeducational school in Rawdon, Quebec. The school is associated with the Clerics of Saint Viator (or Clercs de Saint-Viateur in French) (C.S.V.), a Roman Catholic teaching order, and is named after Étienne Champagneur, a member of that order.
