= Diocese of Saint-Jean–Longueuil =

Catholic ecclesiastical territory

Diocese of Saint-Jean–Longueuil Dioecesis Sancti Ioannis–Longoliensis Diocèse de Saint-Jean Longueuil
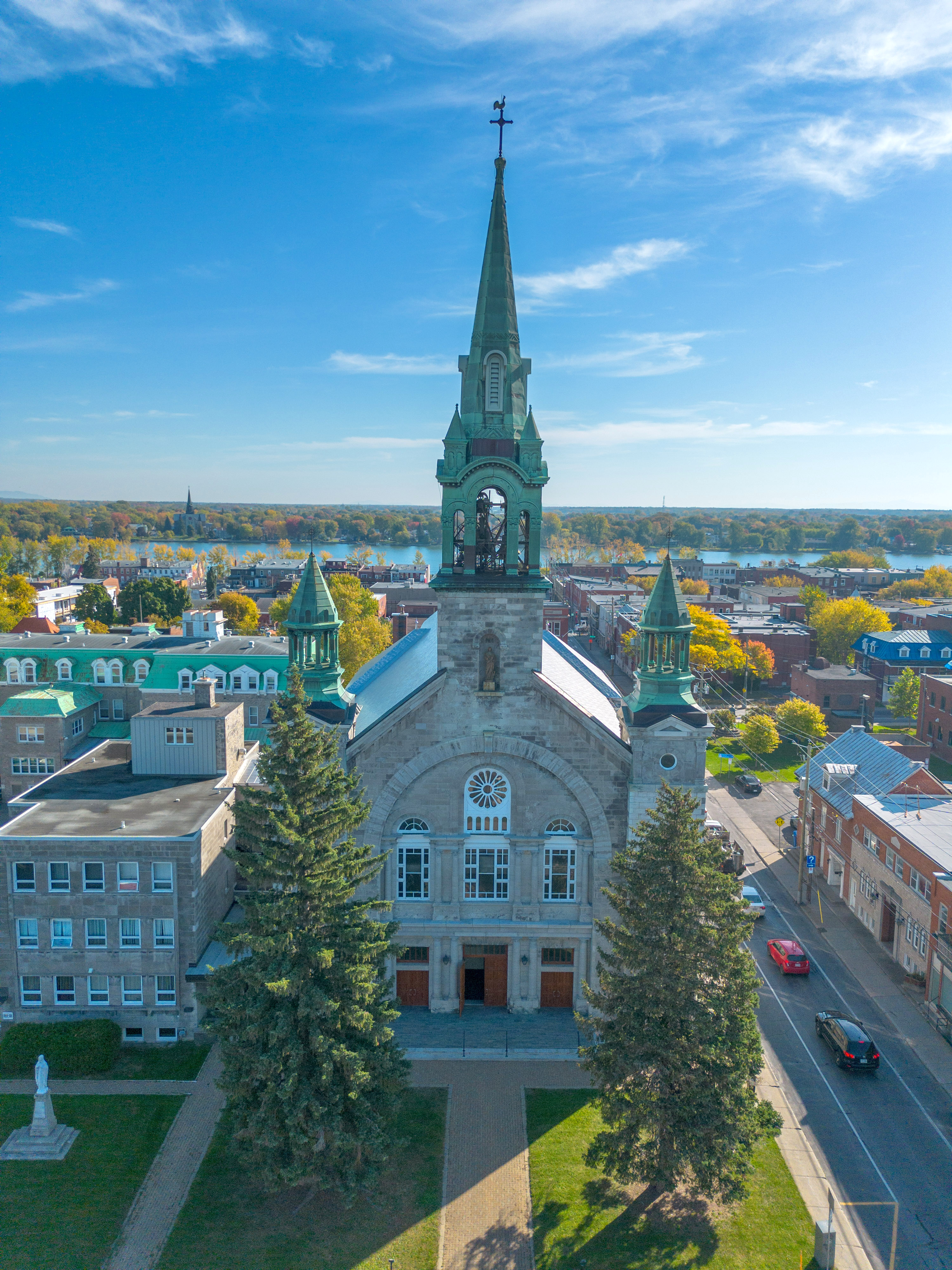
- Cathedral of Saint-Jean-l'Évangéliste in 2025

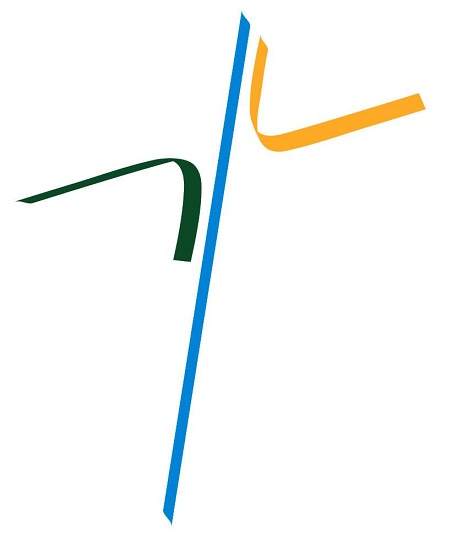
- Coat of arms

Location
- Country: Canada
- Territory: Montérégie
- Ecclesiastical province: Archdiocese of Montréal
- Coordinates: 45°32′25″N 73°30′28″W

Statistics
- Area: 2,078 km^{2} (802 sq mi)
- Population: Total; Catholics: 762,240; 634,425 (83.2%)
- Parishes: 45

Information
- Denomination: Catholic Church
- Rite: Roman Rite
- Established: June 9, 1933
- Cathedral: Cathedral of Saint-Jean-l'Évangéliste
- Co-cathedral: Co-Cathedral of Saint-Antoine-de-Padoue
- Patron saint: John the Evangelist
- Secular priests: 60

Current leadership
- Pope: Leo XIV
- Bishop: Claude Hamelin
- Metropolitan Archbishop: Christian Lépine
- Bishops emeritus: Lionel Gendron, P.S.S.

Website
- dsjl.org

The Roman Catholic Diocese of Saint-Jean–Longueuil (Latin: Dioecesis Sancti Ioannis–Longoliensis) is a suffragan of the Metropolitan Archdiocese of Montréal in (mostly francophone) Québec, southeastern Canada.

Diocese of Saint-Jean–Longueuil
Cathedrals:
1 Cathedral of Saint-Jean-l'Évangéliste
2 Co-Cathedral of Saint-Antoine-de-Padoue

Its cathedral episcopal see is the Cathédrale Saint-Jean-l’Évangéliste dedicated to John the Evangelist, in Saint-Jean-sur-Richelieu. The Diocese also has a co-cathedral, dedicated to Saint Anthony of Padua, in Longueuil and a minor basilica: Basilique Sainte-Anne-de-Varennes, in Varennes.

== History ==
- Erected on 9 June 1933, as the Diocese of Saint-Jean-de-Québec, on territory split off from the Archdiocese of Montréal, its Metropolitan.
- It was renamed on 27 February 1982 as Diocese of Saint-Jean–Longueuil / SanctiIoannis–Longolien(sis) (Latin).

== Statistics ==
As per 2015, it pastorally served 634,425 Catholics (83.2% of 762,240 total) on 2,078 km^{2} (802 sq mi) in 45 parishes and 1 mission with 89 priests (60 diocesan, 29 religious), 4 deacons, 350 lay religious (99 brothers, 251 sisters) and 4 seminarians.

== Bishops ==
=== Episcopal Ordinaries ===
(all Roman Rite native Canadians)

Suffragan Bishops of Saint-Jean-de-Québec

- Paul-Ernest-Anastase Forget (1934.05.12 – death 1955.02.03)
- Gérard-Marie Coderre (1955.02.03 – retired 1978.05.03), died 1993; succeeded as former Titular Bishop of Ægæ (1951.07.05 – 1955.02.03) and Coadjutor Bishop of Saint-Jean-de-Québec (1951.07.05 – 1955.02.03)
- Bernard Hubert (1978.05.03 – 1982.02.27 see below), previously Bishop of Saint-Jérôme (Canada) (1971.06.25 – 1977.01.27), Coadjutor Bishop of Saint-Jean-de-Québec (1977.01.27 – 1978.05.03)

Suffragan Bishops of Saint-Jean-de-Longueuil

- Bernard Hubert (see above 1982.02.27 – death 1996.02.02), also President of Canadian Conference of Catholic Bishops (1985 – 1987)
- Jacques Berthelet, Viatorians (C.S.V.) (1996.12.27 – retired 2010.10.28), also President of Canadian Conference of Catholic Bishops (2001 – 2003); previously Superior General of Clerics of Saint Viator (Viatorians) (1984 – 1986.12.19), Titular Bishop of Lamsorti (1986.12.19 – 1996.12.27) as Auxiliary Bishop of Saint-Jean–Longueuil (1986.12.19 – succession 1996.12.27)
- Lionel Gendron, P.S.S. (28 October 2010 - retired 5 November 2019), also vice-president of Canadian Conference of Catholic Bishops (2015.09.15 – 2017.09.27); previously Titular Bishop of Tagase (2006.02.11 – 2010.10.28) as Auxiliary Bishop of Archdiocese of Montréal (Canada) (2006.02.11 – 2010.10.28)
- Claude Hamelin (5 November 2019 – present)

=== Coadjutor bishops ===
- Gérard-Marie Coderre (1951–1955)
- Bernard Hubert (1977–1978)
- Martin Laliberté, P.M.E. (2026–present), transferring from the Diocese of Trois-Rivières

=== Auxiliary bishops ===
- Robert Lebel (1974–1976), appointed Bishop of Valleyfield, Québec
- Jacques Berthelet, C.S.V. (1986–1996), appointed Bishop here
- Louis Dicaire (2004–2020), Titular Bishop of Thizica (1999.02.18 – 2020.07.19), previously Auxiliary Bishop of Archdiocese of Montréal (Canada) (1999.02.18 – 2004.06.19)
- Claude Hamelin (2015–2019), Titular Bishop of Apollonia (2015.12.22 – 2019.11.05); appointed Bishop here

=== Other priest of this diocese who became bishop ===
- Raymond Poisson, appointed Auxiliary Bishop of Saint-Jérôme, Québec in 2012

== See also ==
- List of Catholic dioceses in Canada

== Sources and external links ==
- GCatholic, with Google map - data for all sections
- Diocese of Saint-Jean-Longueuil site (in French)
- "Diocese of Saint-Jean-Longueuil". Catholic-Hierarchy.
