= Stanley Clark Bagg =

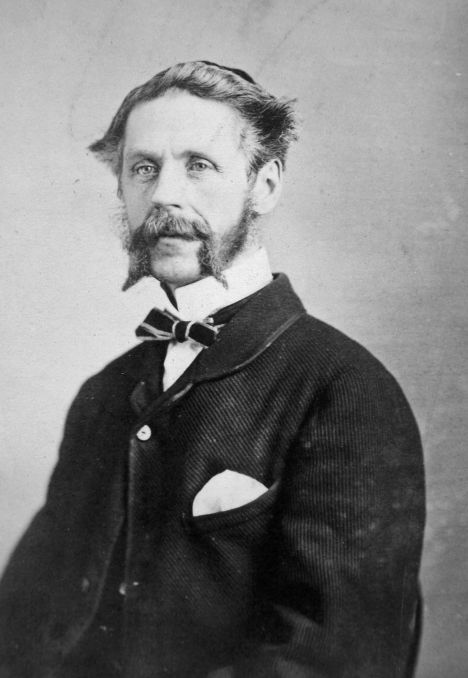
Stanley Clark Bagg, 1863

Stanley Clark Bagg (23 December 1820 – 8 August 1873) was a Canadian landowner in Villeray, a district of Montreal. He owned the land that became Jarry Park.
