= Raoul Jarry =

Canadian politician (1885–1930)

Raoul Jarry (1885 – January 23, 1930) was a Canadian politician and a City Councillor in Montreal, Quebec.

== Background ==
Raoul Jarry was born in 1885 to Stanislas Bleignier Jarry Sr (1844-1901) and Delphine Jasmin (1855-1942). Jarry had brothers, Arthur Jarry, Henri Jarry (1893-1961), Horace Jarry (1886-1902) and Stanislas Jarry Jr (1876-1936). Henri was alderman for Villeray from 1934 to 1938. Arthur was a doctor.

The Jarry family owned land once used for farming and rue Jarry was named for their soldier and settler ancestor, Bernard Bleignier dit Jarry (b. 1679 in Naves, Limousin, France - died 1736 in Saint-Laurent, New France), who was one of the first few settlers whom obtained land grants in 1700 in what is now St. Laurent, Quebec. The Jarry family arrived in New France before or around 1698.

Raoul's brother, Stanislas Jr., was mayor of the parish municipality of St. Laurent in 1907 and 1908.

== City Councillor ==
In 1921, he was elected to the City Council of Montreal for the district of Villeray. He was re-elected in 1924, 1926 and 1928. From 1924 until his death, Jarry was a Member of Montreal's Executive Committee. He played a role in the development of Jarry Park in 1925.

== Death ==
Jarry died in office in Montreal on January 23, 1930 and buried in a family plot at St. Laurent Cemetery.

== Honors ==
Jarry Park was named to honor Raoul Jarry. Jarry Street and the Jarry Metro station were named after Bernard Bleignier dit Jarry, who was one of the first settlers of St. Laurent, Quebec.

== Footnotes ==
Political offices
Preceded by The electoral district was established in 1921.	City Councillor, District of Villeray; 1921-1930	Succeeded by Bruno Charbonneau
