= École secondaire des Chutes (Rawdon) =

Canadian secondary school

Coordinates: 46.0513°N 73.7258°W

École secondaire des Chutes is a Francophone secondary school in Rawdon, Quebec, operated by the Commission scolaire des Samares.
