= Canadiana Village =

Heritage park in Quebec, Canada

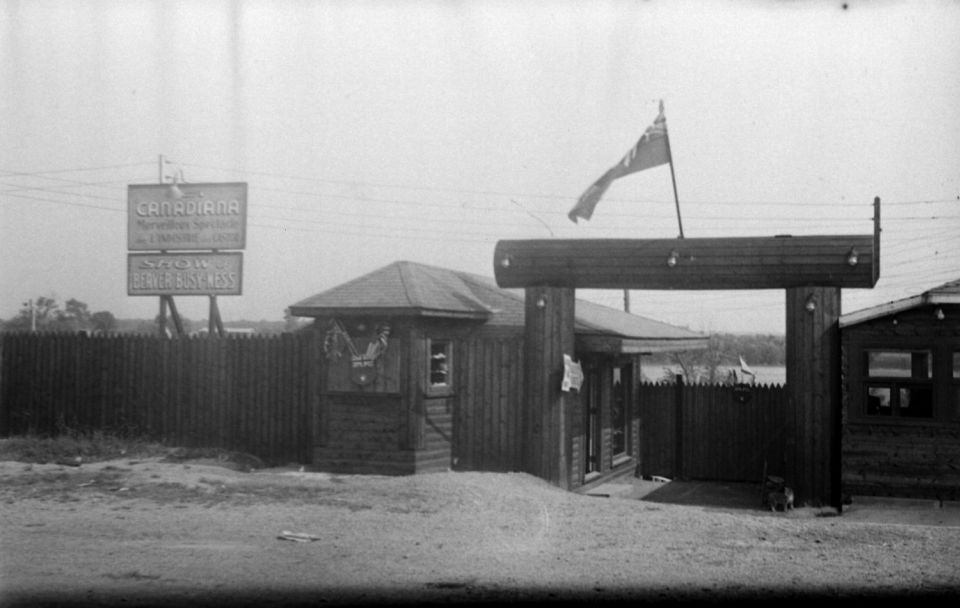

- Location in central Quebec.
- Established: 1946
- Location: Rawdon, Quebec, Canada
- Coordinates: 46°04′56″N 73°42′39″W
- Type: heritage park
- Website: canadianavillage.com

Canadiana Village is a heritage park north of Montreal near Rawdon, Quebec. About 15% of the land is used to depict a 19th-century western town and rural village in Quebec. The rest of the site consists of lush forest, brooks, river, and mountain. Canadiana Village endeavours to depict life in a pioneer Quebec Canadian settlement during the 19th century. Featured at the site are over 40 historical buildings, with over 38 original buildings more than 100 years old. The Copping homestead, was built on what was later the site of Canadiana Village. The buildings in the western town and rural village include a church, a general store, a mill, a cemetery, a saloon and 22 houses. There are old tractors and threshing machines, props and decoration items for movie set. The Canadiana Village was closed to the public in 1996.

== History ==
Earle Moore's Canadiana Village was the earliest identified example of an Outdoor Museum in Canada. The Village began as a hobby. The Village started with one relocated building in 1946 and gradually was added to, evoking life in a pre-industrial rural Quebec. The Moores purchased or were given the buildings to save them from demolition. The collections of Canadiana were procured privately, without government aide.

Earle Moore (February 11, 1907 – December 2, 1990) and his wife Nora Geraldine Lehane Moore (August 1, 1910 – May 25, 1988), its former cofounders, collected heritage buildings and ancestral homes and period furniture from the 1940s until 1990. By 1962, the Moores had collected a 90-year-old farmhouse, general school, church and a blacksmith. By 1963, the Moores had collected the early medical books, and examining instruments of Dr. Norman Smiley, who practiced in the Rawdon region from 1893-1943. Their veterinarian, pharmacy and dental collections included interior furnishings and equipment.

Earle Moore, a businessman owned Moore Brothers Machinery, Montreal and served as an international commissioner of the Boy Scouts in 1962. Many of the buildings were ancestral homes transplanted from across Quebec including a typical settler's log cabin of 1842, in which Earle Moore's grandmother was born in Mille Isles. From 1946–1971, the Moores had just been able to show the Village to groups by appointment. By 1971, the Village had become a family project shared with, their son and daughter and their five grandchildren. In the 1970s-1996, the Village was open to the public. In the 1970s, Canadiana Village, which was a popular destination for school field trips, welcomed 30,000 tourists per year. Guides, in the costume of the era, showed how to:

- spin and dye wool,
- weave fabric on homemade looms,
- bake bread,
- churn milk and make ice cream.

By 1985, Earle Moore's Canadiana Village featured 12 restored buildings from different villages in Quebec with early Canadian Furniture and equipment.

Earle Moore's Canadiana Village Inc. has been registered as a company since December 18, 1987. Some of the buildings are reproductions, which were built for movie shoots. By 1989, the collection of 28 buildings, including Rowan's water mill, had become a retirement project.

The Moores' daughter Geraldine Moore McDonald and her husband John McDonald took over the Living History Museum. She sought government funding unsuccessfully for the museum.

The village is not opened to public visiting at any time of the year. Canadiana Village hosts various special events throughout their season and more information can be found on their website.

== In film ==
The site has been used as a film location since 1986. In "Barnum", a TV movie filmed in 1986 starring Burt Lancaster, the Canadiana Village was used to represent a nineteenth-century circus parade scene in Bridgeport.

Canadiana Village was featured in over 110 films include "Cordelia" and "Les Folks de Liberty". The village was featured in TV productions, including Radio-Canada's Pays d'en haut and "I'm Not There", a Bob Dylan biographical drama. The Canadian TV movie "Ichabod, A Legend of Sleepy Hollow", was directed by Pierre Gang at Canadian Village in August 1999. The Quebec film "Chasse-galerie, La legend" which was released in 2016, was shot in Canadiana Village.

== Buildings ==
Most of the buildings and structures were relocated to the Canadiana village in the foothills of the Laurentian Mountains over the years: The buildings, which include a home of a wealthy landowner and the modest dwellings of labourers, were hauled from their original locations, then restored and furnished authentically with cribs, toys, and children's clothing. In 1971, a grist mill, barber shop, shoemaker shop and a doctor's office were added.

- The Blacksmith shop and settler's cabin in which Earle Moore's grandmother was born, were both built in 1842 in Mille Isles, Quebec. The buildings were relocated to the Canadiana Village in 1962-3. The oldest building, a settler's cabin constructed in 1815, is completely furnished, from apple dryers and candle molds to a trundle bed with its original bedding, and some of the original owner's clothes, including a pair of women's "picnic, pants".
- The Rowan's water grist Mill was relocated to the village in 1971.
- Covered Edward Bridge, which was constructed in 1888 in Coaticook, Quebec was re-erected in 1972 over the little river flowing through the village. An old-time raising bee was held, with local people pitching in to help.
- Cemetery Vault
- Cemetery used in film "Les fils de la liberté"
- Sugar Shack
- Delorme House
- Gift Shop
- The Indians Log House
- Brooks and river
- Gazebo
- Rawdon's original presbytery of St. Patrick's Roman Catholic Church of Rawdon was the first house moved to the Canadiana Village site.
- Built in 1823, and relocated in 1952, the former Farm House residence of the Moores, who founded the Canadiana Village, features ovens for baking bread, wheels for spinning wool and vats for storing wine.
- Buggy Display, an Irish junting cart
- The log Schoolhouse, which was built in Lakefield, Quebec by Earle Moore's grandfather in 1835 with residence for the teacher upstairs. The classroom features desks with carved initials, a wood stove dependent on logs supplied by parents, and a pail to be filled with well water. The schoolhouse was purchased by Earle Moore for $50 and moved to Canadiana Village for $5000 in 1962.
- Rourke House, a log house, which was built in the 1850s.
- The General Store, constructed in Saint-Anicet, Valleyfield in 1884, was with foods that are not home made, shoes, books, and construction equipment. The General Store, which contains the original Rawdon post office and a collection of wooden cradles, was relocated to the village in 1962.
- The Wheelright Shop and Carriage Maker
- Barber Shop and Hat Shop, featuring an assortment of fabrics, ribbons, and feathers was relocated in 1971.
- Shoemakers Shop, where a cobbler lived and worked was relocated in 1971
- Westgate Homestead, featuring cooking on an Iron step stove and spinning of yarn
- Milkhouse, featuring cream churns and separators for making butter.
- Henri's House, Barn and chicken coop
- Music House
- The inn
- Print Shop, featuring the equipment for printing a community paper
- The Western Saloon, reproduced for the film "Red River"
- Outdoor Bake Oven
- Grandma's Log House
- Veterinary
- The Notary
- The log chapel, constructed in 1849 with a confessional well, reproduced for the film "Les fils de la liberté", features the original altar from St. Patrick's Roman Catholic Church of Rawdon
- The Prison
- Jones/School Master's House
- Tinsmith
- The Doctor's House, which features a dentist chair, infirmary and nurses' quarters, was relocated in 1971.
- The Dressmaker's House
- The Western Section

== Graveyard ==
Officials from the St. Patrick's Roman Catholic Church of Rawdon decided that tombstones, which were not being financed by the descendants would be bulldozed and the spaces reassigned to paying families. Church members contacted Earle Moore of Canadiana Village, who offered to place the tombstones beside the St. Patrick's Roman Catholic Church replica:

- John Daly, son of Luke Daly, died June 9, 1856, aged 19 years.
- John Sheilds died June 2, 1882, aged 82. A native of County Down, his wife, Mary Wood.
- John Woods August 6, 1904, aged 75 years; his wife Ann Sheilds died September 17, 1908
- Bridget Deahan, wife of Patrick Monohan died September 19, 1886, aged 88 years; Patrick Monohan died December 14, 1888, aged 88 years
- Michael McCarvill died August 17, 1893, aged 97 years; his wife Norah Finnerty died September 5, 1899
- Hugh Daly died November 2, 1861, aged 50 years
- Thomas Corcoran died April 17, 1865, aged 71,
