= Co-Cathedral of Saint-Antoine-de-Padoue =

Co-cathédrale Saint-Antoine-de-Padoue
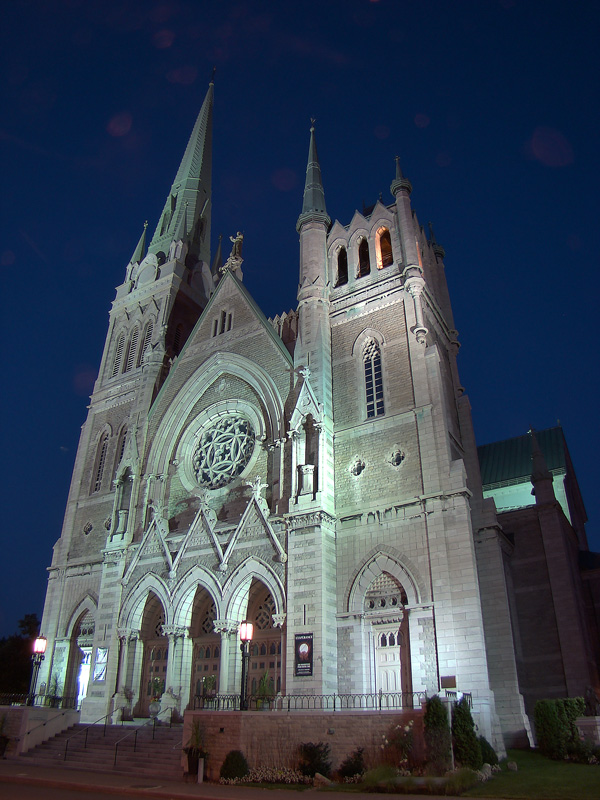
- Exterior in 2007
- Co-cathédrale Saint-Antoine-de-Padoue
- 45°32′25″N 73°30′29″W
- Location: Longueuil, Quebec
- Country: Canada
- Denomination: Roman Catholic

History
- Status: Co-cathedral
- Founded: 1698
- Dedication: St. Anthony of Padua
- Consecrated: 27 January 1887

Architecture
- Functional status: Active
- Architect(s): Albert Ménard (1847-1909), Henri-Maurice Perrault (1857-1909)
- Style: Gothic Revival
- Groundbreaking: 1884
- Completed: 1911
- Construction cost: $98,895

Specifications
- Length: 74 metres (243 ft)
- Width: 41 metres (135 ft)
- Height: 81 metres (266 ft)
- Materials: Stone

Administration
- Archdiocese: Montreal
- Diocese: Saint-Jean-Longueuil
- Parish: Saint-Antoine-de-Padoue

Clergy
- Bishop: Claude Hamelin
- Priest(s): Charles Mangongo Male, r.s.v.

Patrimoine culturel du Québec
- Type: Historic monument
- Designated: 1984

The Co-Cathedral of Saint-Antoine-de-Padoue (French: Co-cathédrale Saint-Antoine-de-Padoue) is a co-cathedral in Longueuil, Quebec, Canada, on Montreal's south shore. It is located on the corner of Rue Saint-Charles and Chemin Chambly in the Borough of Le Vieux-Longueuil. It is dedicated to St. Anthony of Padua. The cathedral houses the remains of the Blessed Marie-Rose Durocher, the foundress of the Sisters of the Holy Names of Jesus and Mary.

Its episcopal region is Longueuil-Nord. Lionel Gendron, the bishop, has a cathedra sculpted in walnut. Before the reign of Bernard Hubert, it was simply a parish church.

The cathedral was classified as historical monument by the Government of Quebec in 1984.

== History ==
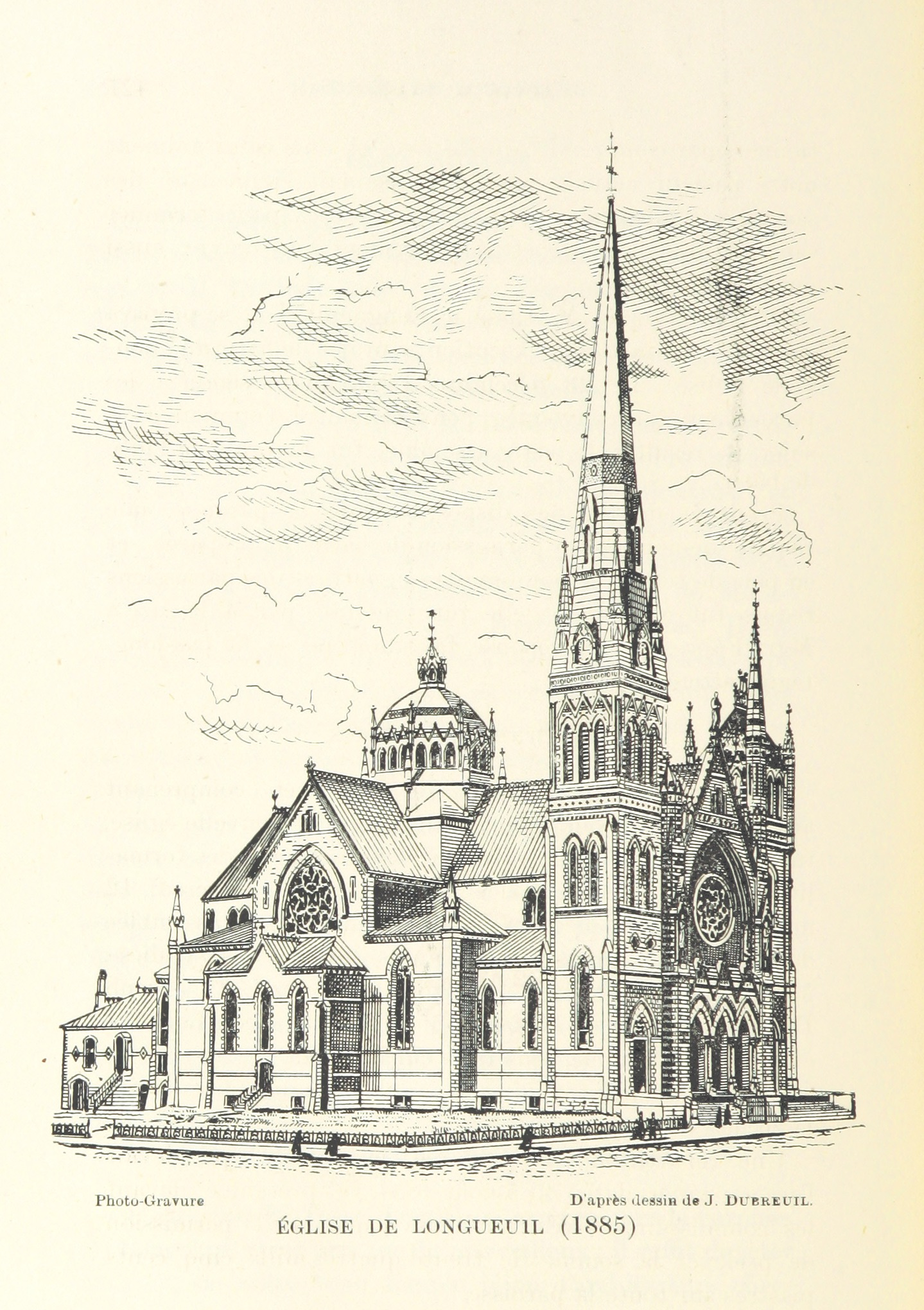
Outline of the planned cathedral, 1885

The site contains the archaeological remains of Fort Longueuil, a fort constructed between 1685 and 1690 as the fortified residence of Charles le Moyne de Longueuil, the only Canadian-born person to be raised to the rank of Baron by the French King. The fort was demolished in 1810 and the cathedral contains stone building materials and elements salvaged from the fort. The site of the fort was designated a National Historic Site of Canada in 1923.

The Parish of Saint-Antoine-de-Padoue was founded in 1698, and is one of the oldest in Canada. The present cathedral building was largely built from 1884 to 1887, although it was not completed until 1911. It is the third church in the history of Longueuil, the first being completed in 1811.

Saint-Antoine-de-Padoue was designated as a co-cathedral in 1982 when the Roman Catholic Diocese of Saint-Jean-de-Québec was renamed the Roman Catholic Diocese of Saint-Jean-Longueuil. The Cathedral of Saint-Jean-l'Évangéliste has been the primary cathedral of the diocese since its establishment in 1933.

A funeral was held for Jean-Pierre Côté, the 23rd Lieutenant Governor of Quebec, on July 17, 2002.

In 2005, that the faithful of the diocese paid tribute to Pope John Paul II, following his death. They also wished a happy pontificate to his successor, Pope Benedict XVI, during a special vigil attended by the bishop as well as a local congregation of Filipino Religious Sisters.

== Architecture ==
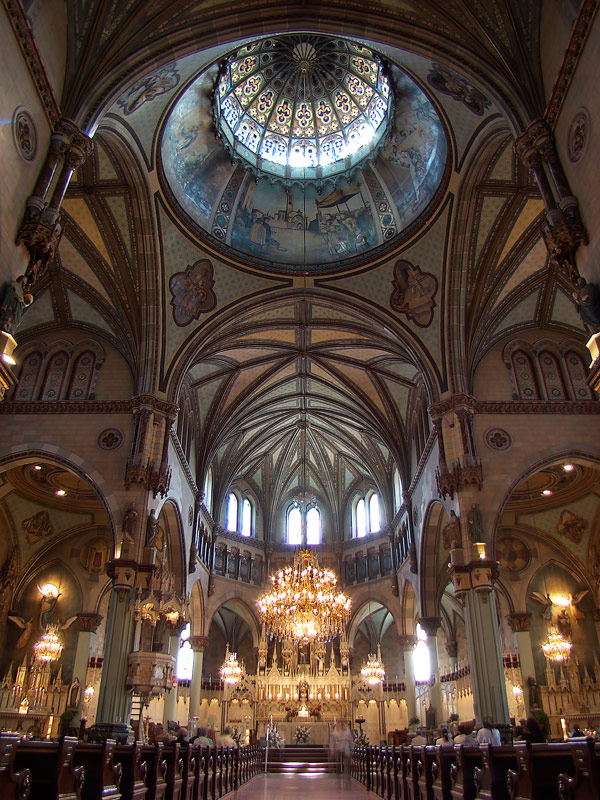
Interior of the cathedral, before the Byzantine Revival-styled dome

The cathedral was constructed in the Gothic revival style of architecture, while the dome is an example of Byzantine Revival architecture.

The architects Henri-Maurice Perrault and Albert Mesnard wanted the cathedral to be of great volume. The same architects built the church's altar, combining fine stones with the hardest stone. The Québécois sculptor, Louis-Philippe Hébert, contributed to the cathedral's facade, by creating three sculptures out of wood, covered in metal. The church was constructed at a cost of $98,895 by Eugène Fournier dit Préfontaine, an entrepreneur, farmer and carpenter.

The cathedral is very large, measuring 74 metres (243 ft) long, 41 metres (135 ft) wide and 81 metres (266 ft) high. Louis Jobin renovated the church in 1930. The roof, which had been covered in steel, was restored in 1999 using 60,000 pounds (27,000 kg) of copper. Further restoration work is planned.

== Functions ==
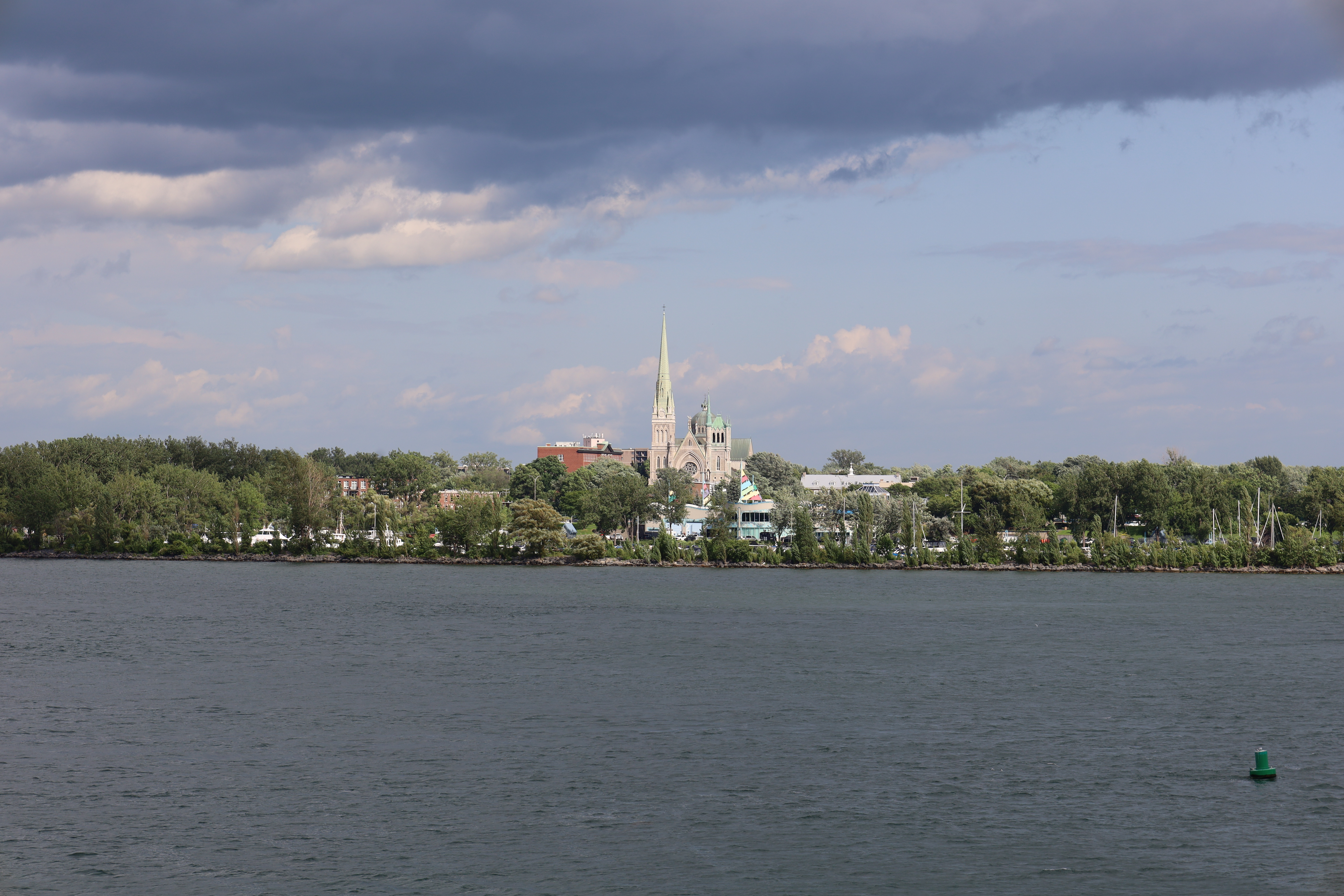
View from the St. Lawrence River in 2023

Mass is ordinarily celebrated at 4:30 PM Monday to Friday, once Saturday, and Two times Sunday. The Confessionals are normally ready fifteen minutes before mass. Around one third of the cathedral is full for weekend services, while it is less than one sixth full during the week. There are approximately 9,400 Roman Catholics in the parish. The churchwardens regularly organize fundraising campaigns to proceed with renovations to the cathedral as well as for the parish's rectory.

Part of the cathedral's crypt holds the graves of the Le Moyne and Grant families, affiliated with the title of Baron de Longueuil.

== Priests ==
Inside the cathedral, there is a plaque listing all the priests in the parish's history.

| Name | Years | Name | Years |
|---|---|---|---|
| Pierre Millette | 1698-1701 | L. Moïse Brassard | 1840 -1855 |
| Pierre de Francheville | 1701-1713 | Georges-Amable Thibault | 1855-1883 |
| Fr. Nic. Ber. Constantin | 1713-1715 | Maximilien Tassé | 1883-1901 |
| Claude Dauzaf | 1715-1717 | J.-Georges Payette | 1901-1938 |
| François Céré | 1717-1720 | Mgr. Albéric Picotte | 1938-1943 |
| Joseph Isambart | 1720-1763 | Mgr. Romain Boulé | 1943-1962 |
| Claude-Charles Carpentier | 1763-1777 | J. Alcide Careau | 1963-1974 |
| Charles-Basile Campeau | 1777-1782 | Jean-Louis Yelle | 1974-1983 |
| J.-Étienne Desmeules | 1783-1789 | Jean-Hugues Trudeau | 1983-1995 |
| Mgr. Pierre Denaut | 1789-1806 | Raymond Poisson | 1995-2007 |
| Augustin Chaboillez | 1806-1834 | Yves Le Pain | 2007- |
| Antoine Manseau | 1834-1840 |
