= Cyrille Beaudry =

- Born: April 16, 1835; Saint-Paul-d'Industrie, Lower Canada
- Died: May 3, 1904 (aged 69); Joliette, Quebec
- Known for: school administrator and educator

Cyrille Beaudry (April 16, 1835 – May 3, 1904) was a Roman Catholic priest and educator in Canada.

Beaudry was born and educated in Lower Canada. He worked for most of his career as an educator and administrator within Collège Joliette in Joliette, Quebec. He was a member of the Clerics of Saint Viator.

In addition, he wrote several religious works and numerous pamphlets and articles, which are a valuable resource to present day religious scholars.
