= Cathedral of Saint-Jean-l'Évangéliste =

Cathedral in Saint-Jean-sur-Richelieu, Quebec, Canada

Coordinates: 45.3063°N 73.2543°W

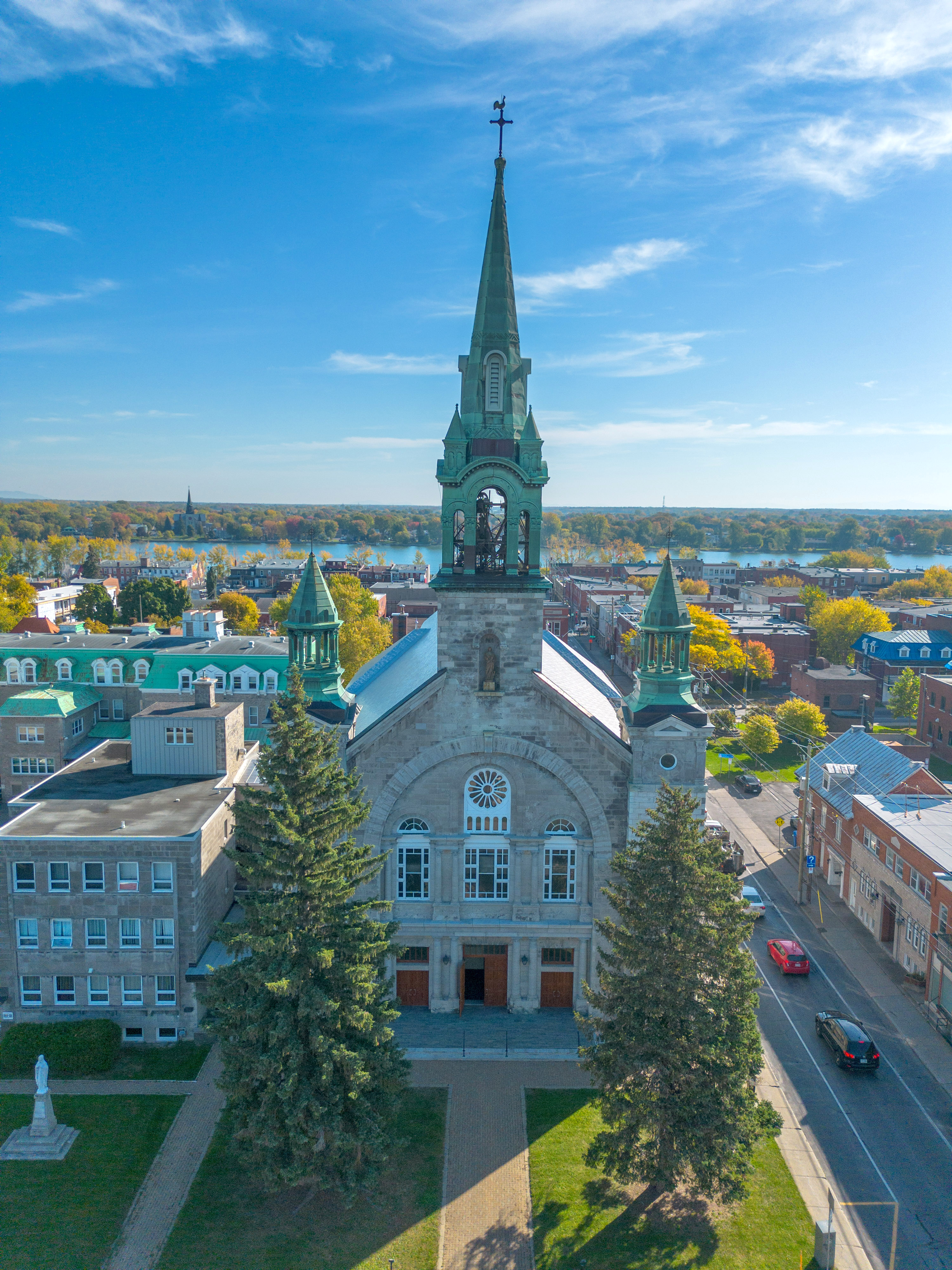
Cathedral of Saint-Jean-l'Évangéliste at Saint-Jean-sur-Richelieu

The Cathedral of Saint-Jean-l'Évangéliste (St. John the Evangelist) is the seat of the Roman Catholic Diocese of Saint-Jean-Longueuil in Canada. It is located in the city of Saint-Jean-sur-Richelieu, Quebec.

== History ==
The cathedral was founded as a parish church in 1828 to serve the people of the region, who until then had to cross the Iroquois River for religious services in Montreal, some 50 km (30 miles) away. The original church fronted on the Rue Jacques-Cartier. Within 30 thirty years the need for repairs of the existing church had become so great that it was decided to build a new one.

Given the increased commerce on the river and the incorporation of the town in the 1850s, it was decided to build a larger and grander structure. Construction began in 1861 and lasted five years, under the architect Victor Bourgeau. The interior was designed by Napoléon Bourassa. The new church had been built with a different orientation, and now fronted on the Rue Longueuil. Major renovations were done in 1923 to repair the facade and steeple.

The region was separated from the Archdiocese of Montreal in June 1933, and established as the new Diocese of Saint-Jean-de-Québec. The church was designated as the cathedral of the new diocese. In 1982 the diocese was renamed to the one it has now. The Church of Saint-Antoine-de-Padoue (St. Anthony of Padua) was designated a co-cathedral to serve the northern sector of the diocese.

Currently the cathedral parish serves the southwest region of the diocese and now covers five former parishes in the region which have been closed for reasons of finance or the need for repairs.

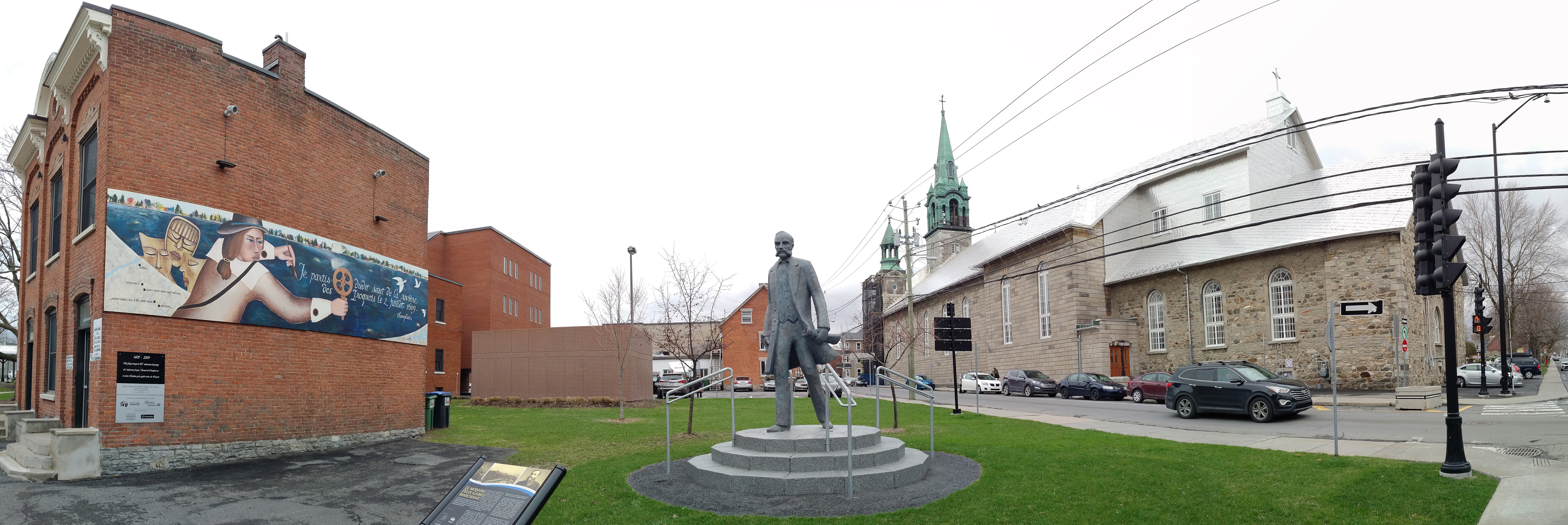
Pamoramic view of the Félix-Gabriel-Marchand monument, the Deland building with its Champlain mural, and side view of the Cathedral of Saint-Jean-l'Évangéliste to the right.
