= Park of Dorwin Falls =

Park in Rawdon, Quebec, Canada

Dorwin Falls
- Parc des chutes Dorwin
- Fr
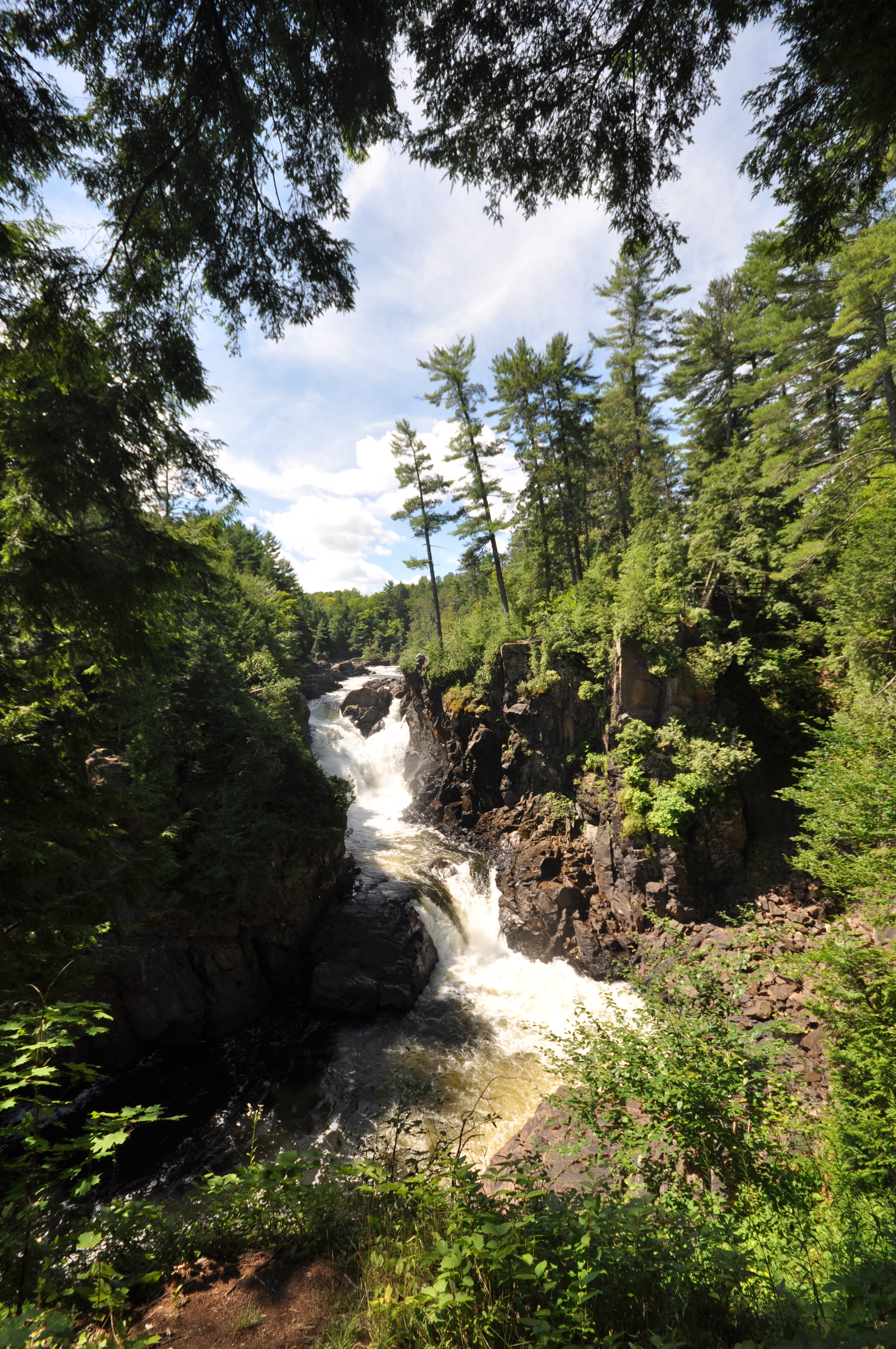
- Dorwin Falls in Rawdon
- Interactive map of Dorwin Falls
- Type: Recreational park
- Location: Rawdon
- Coordinates: 46°01′57″N 73°42′12″W
- Elevation: 150 m (490 ft)
- Administrator: Municipality of Rawdon
- Website: rawdon.ca

Dorwin Falls (French: Parc des chutes Dorwin) is a recreational tourism site, located along the north shore of the Ouareau River, in the municipality of Rawdon, in the Matawinie Regional County Municipality, in the administrative region of Lanaudière, in the province of Quebec, in Canada.

The site is often tied to two other sites in Rawdon: Cascades Park, and the municipal beach. The three sites are accessible free of charge for all residents of Rawdon. Visitors can access it by paying the entrance fee and wearing the prescribed bracelet that allows access to the three sites.

== Dorwin Falls ==
Dorwin Falls is accessible by route 125 and route 335. This park is located on the edge of the Ouareau River.

Main attractions

The Dorwin Falls site includes:

- 3.0 km (1.9 mi) of ecological trails to interpret native flora;
- A picnic area in the scent of the century-old pine forest;
- A 18.3 m (60 ft) high waterfall surrounded by forests;
- Four observation belvederes (panoramic view).

== Cascades Park ==
Cascades Park (French: Parc des Cascades) is built along the Ouareau River and is located upstream of Pontbriand Lake which stretches south of the village of Rawdon by an enlargement of the Ouareau River. The flow of water passing through the rocks offers a magnificent spectacle of nature. Cascades Park is accessible by route 341, approximately 10 minutes by car from the town centre.

Main attractions

Cascades Park includes:

- Picnic areas. Note: barbecue is permitted and the park offers access to an ash deposit
- A launching ramp and daily ticket sale
- Toilets
- Parking lots

== Municipal beach ==
The municipal beach of Rawdon (French: Plage municipale de Rawdon) is accessible by road route 337 and is based a few minutes away from the town centre.

The beach, approximately 38 m (125 ft) wide, offering a natural slope in fine sand, is located on the edge of Rawdon lake. The bathing area of this beach is marked.

Main services offered

- Supervised swimming
- Beach volleyball
- Picnic areas
- Barbecue allowed and access to an ash deposit
- Bathroom
- Parking
- Paddleboard and paddleboat rental services

== Indian legend ==
The Indian legend of Hiawhitha transcends into the history of Dorwin Falls.

Formerly, according to this legend, an old Indian sorcerer lived in the hunting grounds of the Algonquins, on the current territory of Rawdon. This very cunning, skilful and bad-tempered sorcerer was the all-powerful Nipissingue. By abuse of power, he coveted the sweet Hiawhitha; and no one dared to challenge his decisions.

However, Hiawhitha saw her future differently. Baptized, she was born on the banks of the giant river at the confluence of the Rivière-Qui-Marche. She had grown up among whites. Rather, she aspired to become a nun in a community because she had deep Christian beliefs. Daughter of Sachem, Hiawhitha could not decline to marry; nevertheless, she could decide for herself which man would become her husband.

Disconcerted by Nipissingue's request for union, Hiawhitha instead decided to devote the rest of his life to Arondack. However, the latter turns out to be a sworn enemy of Nipissingue. On learning of Hiawhitha's withdrawal, Nipissingue launched the Algonquins on the warpath in order to get rid of this enemy. His anticipation became reality with the vagaries of the fighting. Arondack was brought back to his wigwam dying. As the tribe's nurse, Hiawhitha stood by his bedside and nursed him back to health.

One day, lacking medicinal plants, Hiawhitha walked towards Dorwin's Precipice. A thin stream of water flowed into it at the bottom. Sarsaparilla plants grew there on the banks. On the prowl, Nipissingue saw him and then became enraged. And then he rushed towards her and threw her into the abyss with a sudden gesture. On touching the stream of water, Hiawhitha's body unleashed a loud clap of thunder causing the precipice to vibrate. Then, a magnificent waterfall springs from the summit. Stunned, Nipissingue froze. His body was instantly transformed into stone by the Grand Manitou. Thus, Nipissingue was doomed to hear Hiawhitha's victory song for centuries.

== Toponymy ==
In popular usage, this toponymic designation raises a debate. Should we use the term Darwin or Dorwin? People confuse Charles Darwin, English naturalist and paleontologist. Nevertheless, the term Dorwin turns out to be the most appropriate for local history, as it perpetuates the life work of Jédéhias Hubble Dorwin, owner of these lands and of a sawmill.

In 1944, Mrs. James Ross granted these lands to the municipality of Rawdon. On May 16, 1967, there was an official cession of these lands to the Ministry of Tourism which transformed the site into a recreational park.

The toponym was made official on March 13, 1990, at the Place Names Bank of the Commission de toponymie du Québec.
