= Lamsorti =

Ancient city and bishopric in Roman North Africa

Lamsorti was an Ancient city and bishopric in Roman North Africa, which only remains a Latin Catholic titular see.

== History ==
Lamsorti, at the site of Henchir-Mâfouna in present Algeria, was among many cities of sufficient importance in the Roman province of Numidia to become a suffragan diocese, but destined to fade, plausibly at the seventh century advent of Islam.

It has three historically documented bishops :

- The Donatist schismatic Antonianus took part (without Catholic counterpart) in the Council of Carthage in 411, where the Catholics condemned Donatism as heresy
- Felix attended the Council of Carthage in 484 called by Arian king Huneric of the Vandal Kingdom, and was exiled afterward, like most Catholic bishops
- Florentius took part in another Council of Carthage in 525 held under Vandal king Hilderic.

== Titular see ==
The diocese was nominally restored in 1933 as Latin titular bishopric of Lamsorti (Latin = Curiate Italian) / Lamsorten(sis) (Latin adjective).

It has had the following incumbents, so far of the fitting Episcopal (lowest) rank:

- Michael George Bowen (born Gibraltar) (1970.05.18 – 1971.03.14) as Coadjutor Bishop of Arundel and Brighton (England, UK) (1970.05.18 – 1971.03.14); next succeeded as Bishop of Arundel and Brighton (1971.03.14 – 1977.03.28), Metropolitan Archbishop of Southwark (London, England, UK) (1977.03.28 – retired 2003.11.06)
- Jacques Berthelet, Viatorians (C.S.V.) (1986.12.19 – 1996.12.27) as Auxiliary Bishop of Diocese of Saint-Jean–Longueuil (Quebec, Canada) (1986.12.19 – 1996.12.27); previously Superior General of Clerics of Saint Viator (Viatorians) (1984 – 1986.12.19); later Bishop of above Saint-Jean–Longueuil (1996.12.27 – 2010.10.28), President of Canadian Conference of Catholic Bishops (2001 – 2003)
- Pedro Nicolás Bermúdez Villamizar, Eudists (C.I.M.) (1997.02.15 – ...), first as Auxiliary Bishop of Archdiocese of Caracas (Venezuela) (1997.02.15 – retired 2009.01.17), then as emeritus.

== See also ==
- List of Catholic dioceses in Algeria

== Sources and external links ==
- GCatholic

Bibliography

- Pius Bonifacius Gams, Series episcoporum Ecclesiae Catholicae, Leipzig 1931, p. 466
- Stefano Antonio Morcelli, Africa christiana, Volume I, Brescia 1816, pp. 197–198
