= Sisters of Our Lady of Perpetual Help =

Roman Catholic religious congregation for women

The Sisters of Our Lady of Perpetual Help (La Congrégation des sœurs de Notre-Dame du Perpétuel Secours) (NDPS) is a Roman Catholic Institute of Apostolic Life founded in the parish of Saint-Damien-de-Buckland, Bellechasse, 28 August 1892, by Abbé J.O. Brousseau.

== Founder ==
Joseph-Onésime Brousseau, was born 22 July 1853 in Sainte-Hénédine, Lower Canada, the youngest son of farmers Joseph and Flavie Gagnon Brousseau. He commenced his studies at the Collège de Lévis in 1866 and continued them at the Petit Séminaire de Québec in 1869. He took up his theological studies at the Grand Séminaire de Quebec in 1875 and was ordained a priest on 30 November 1878.

After a few years of parish work in Saint-Gervais, Notre-Dame-Auxiliatrice, Saint-Philémon and Saint-Lambert-de-Lauzon, he was placed in charge of Saint-Damien.

Saint-Damien was a small, poor, rural parish. Upon his arrival in 1882, Brousseau built a small sacristy attached to the mission chapel. In 1892, to meet the needs of the elderly and of the orphans, he built a convent-hospital and looked for sisters who could help manage it.

== History ==
Brousseau recruited the first four religious, among whom was Virginie Fournier, a teacher from Fall River, Massachusetts, originally from Saint-Joseph-de-la-Pointe-De Lévy, Lévis. The third of nine children, a he age of three, her eyes were affected by severe sunstroke a discomfort that will continue throughout her life. Fournier was educated by the Religieuses de Jésus-Marie and was interested in entering religious life, but eye problems had hindered her. In the summer of 1862, Mother Saint-Norbert of the Sisters of Jésus-Marie had written her, suggesting she assist Father Brousseau.

In August 1892, Brousseau, with the help of Fournier, founded the community of the Sœurs de Notre-Dame du Perpétuel Secours, whose mission was the care of the elderly and orphans as well as the education of children. In September, Fournier, or Mother Saint-Bernard as she was called, and the sisters took charge of the classes in the village, and in November they moved into the first wing of the convent he had built. The convent also served as a home for the elderly and an orphanage. Within about three weeks of opening, it had almost two dozen residents. The first profession occurred on 27 March 1897, when fifteen sisters pronounced the three vows of religion for a year, renewing them annually until the taking of their perpetual vows on 10 July 1908.

From the first year of the community's existence, the sisters have conducted the principal schools of the parish of St. Damien. The demand for these religious educators increased, and in 1920 they extended their work beyond Quebec to Ontario. In 1948, they established missions in Latin America and Africa.

== Present day ==
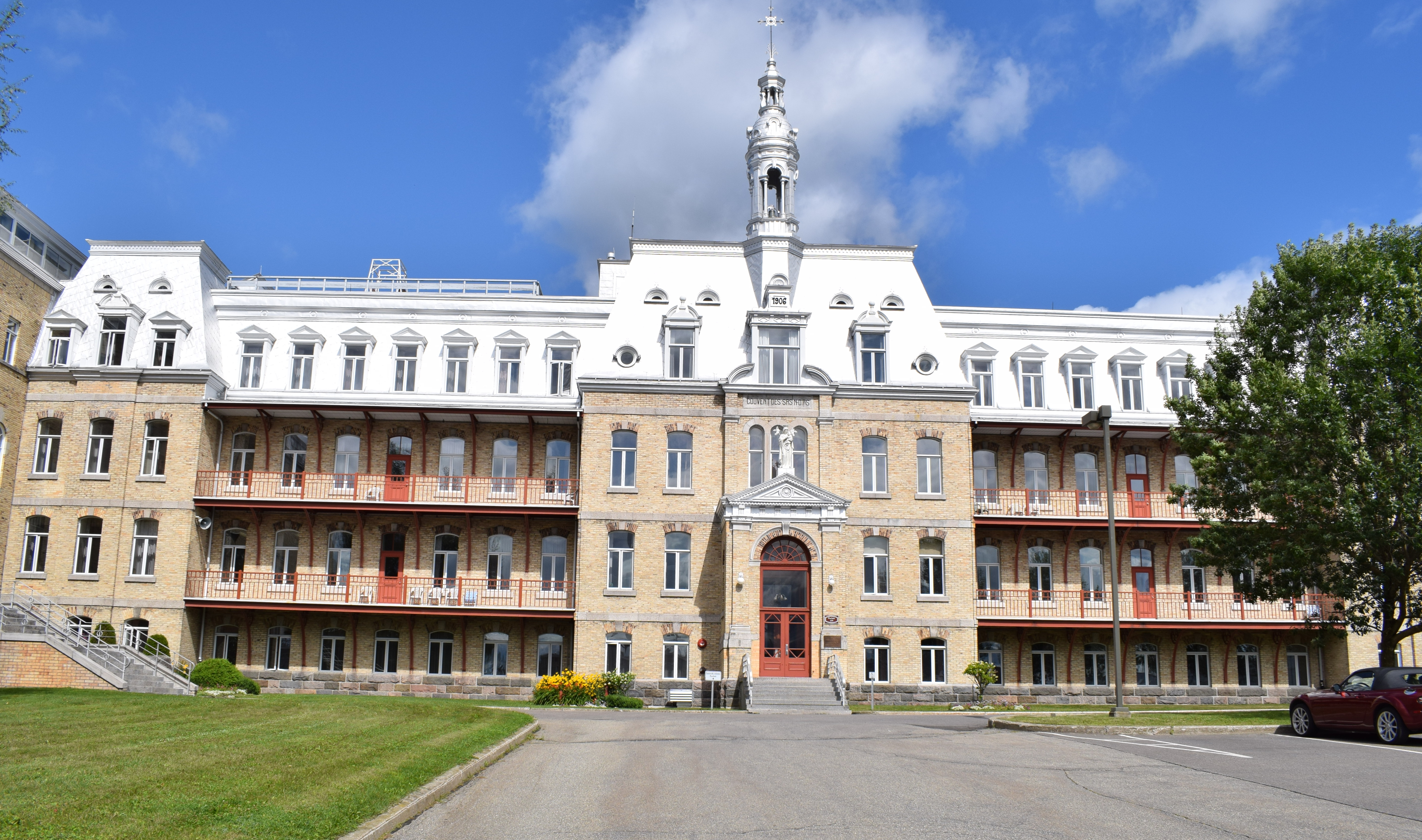
Maison-mère des Soeurs de Notre-Dame-du-Perpétuel-Secours

The mother house is located in Saint-Damien-de-Buckland, Quebec.

The sisters are nurses, dentists, phytotherapists, optometrists, podiatrists, accountants, secretaries, bakers, cooks, seamstresses, hairdressers, painters, iconographers, sculptors, musicians, shoemakers, farmers, laundry workers, etc. In December, 2008, the congregation had 424 members and 62 houses in Canada, the Caribbean, Central and South America, and Africa.

The Notre-Dame du Perpétuel Secours Historic Center was built in the late 1980s and since January 2021, is under the auspices of the Société historique de Bellechasse.

== See also ==
- Catholic Church in Canada
