= Saint-Damien-de-Buckland =

- Parish municipality
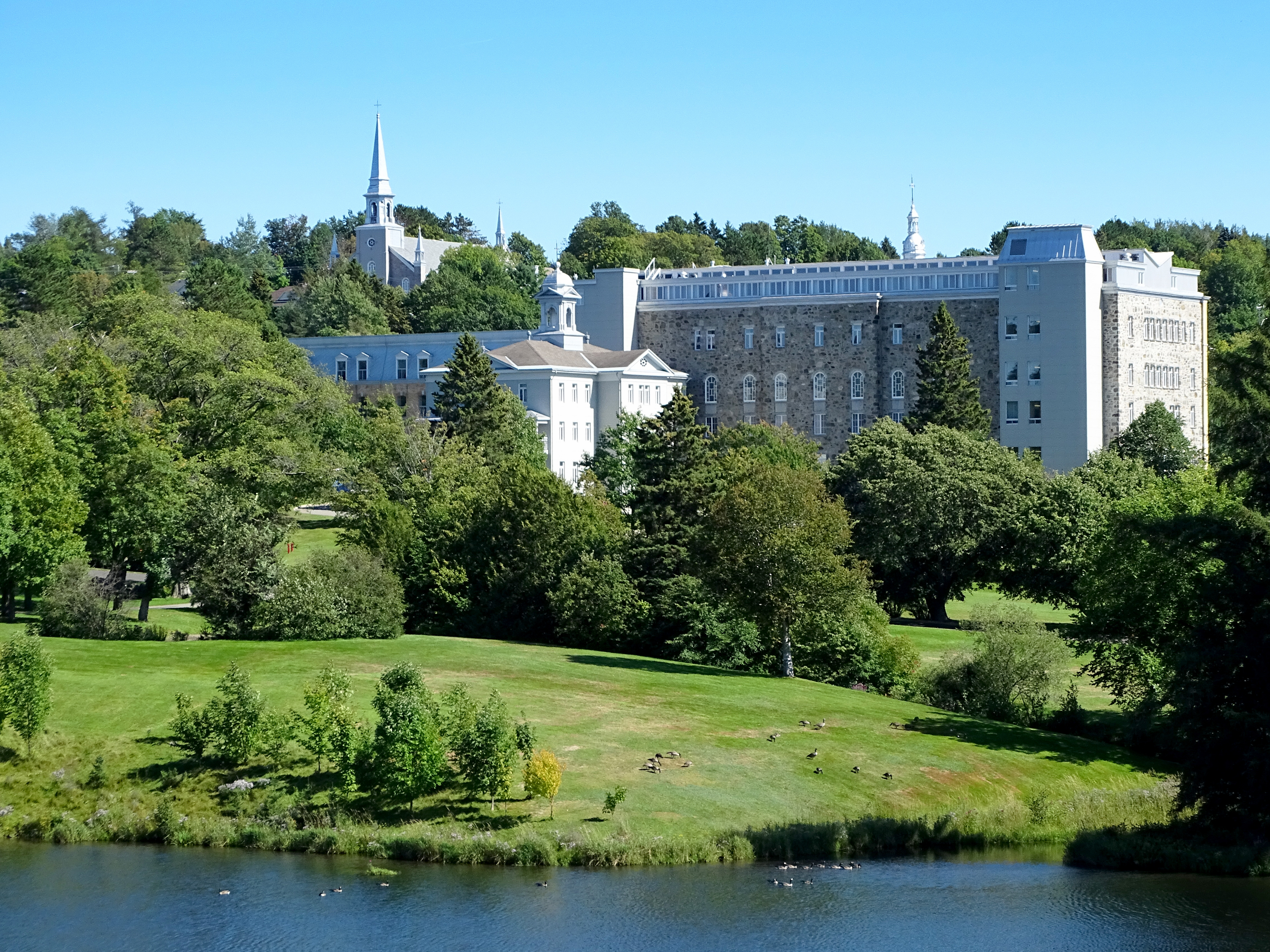

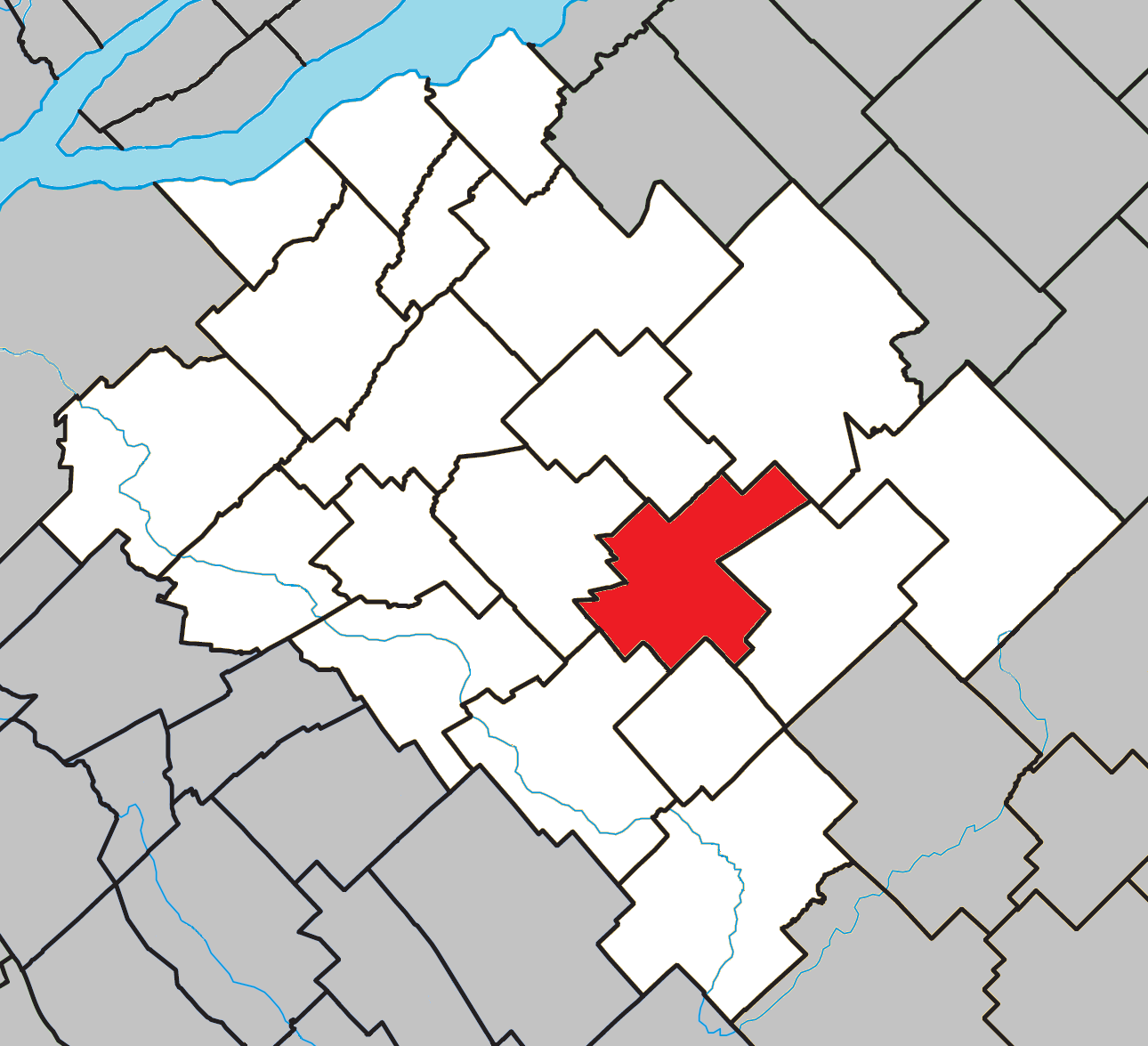
- Location within Bellechasse RCM

- Location in province of Quebec
- Coordinates: 46°38′N 70°40′W
- Country: Canada
- Province: Quebec
- Region: Chaudière-Appalaches
- RCM: Bellechasse
- Constituted: December 20, 1890

Government
  - Mayor: Sébastien Bourget
  - Federal riding: Bellechasse—Les Etchemins—Lévis
  - Prov. riding: Bellechasse

Area
  - Total: 82.70 km^{2} (31.93 sq mi)
  - Land: 82.07 km^{2} (31.69 sq mi)

Population (2016)
  - Total: 1,956
  - Density: 23.8/km^{2} (62/sq mi)
  - Pop 2011-2016: ▼5.6%
  - Dwellings: 944
- Time zone: UTC−5 (EST)
  - Summer (DST): UTC−4 (EDT)
- Postal code(s): G0R 2Y0
- Area codes: 418 and 581
- Highways: R-279
- Website: www.saint-damien.com

Saint-Damien-de-Buckland is a parish municipality in the Bellechasse Regional County Municipality, in the Chaudière-Appalaches region of Quebec. The population was 1,956 in the Canada 2016 Census.

IPL, a manufacturer of wheeled carts and other plastic related products, is located in Saint-Damien and is the biggest employer in the immediate area.

== Demographics ==
In the 2021 Census of Population conducted by Statistics Canada, Saint-Damien-de-Buckland had a population of 1,893 living in 828 of its 949 total private dwellings, a change of −3.2% from its 2016 population of 1,956. With a land area of 82.04 km^{2} (31.68 sq mi), it had a population density of 23.1/km^{2} (59.8/sq mi) in 2021.

== Notable people ==
- Lauriane Genest, professional racing cyclist

== See also ==
- Sisters of Our Lady of Perpetual Help
