= Montreal Institute for the Deaf and Mute =

Coordinates: 45.53550°N 73.62154°W

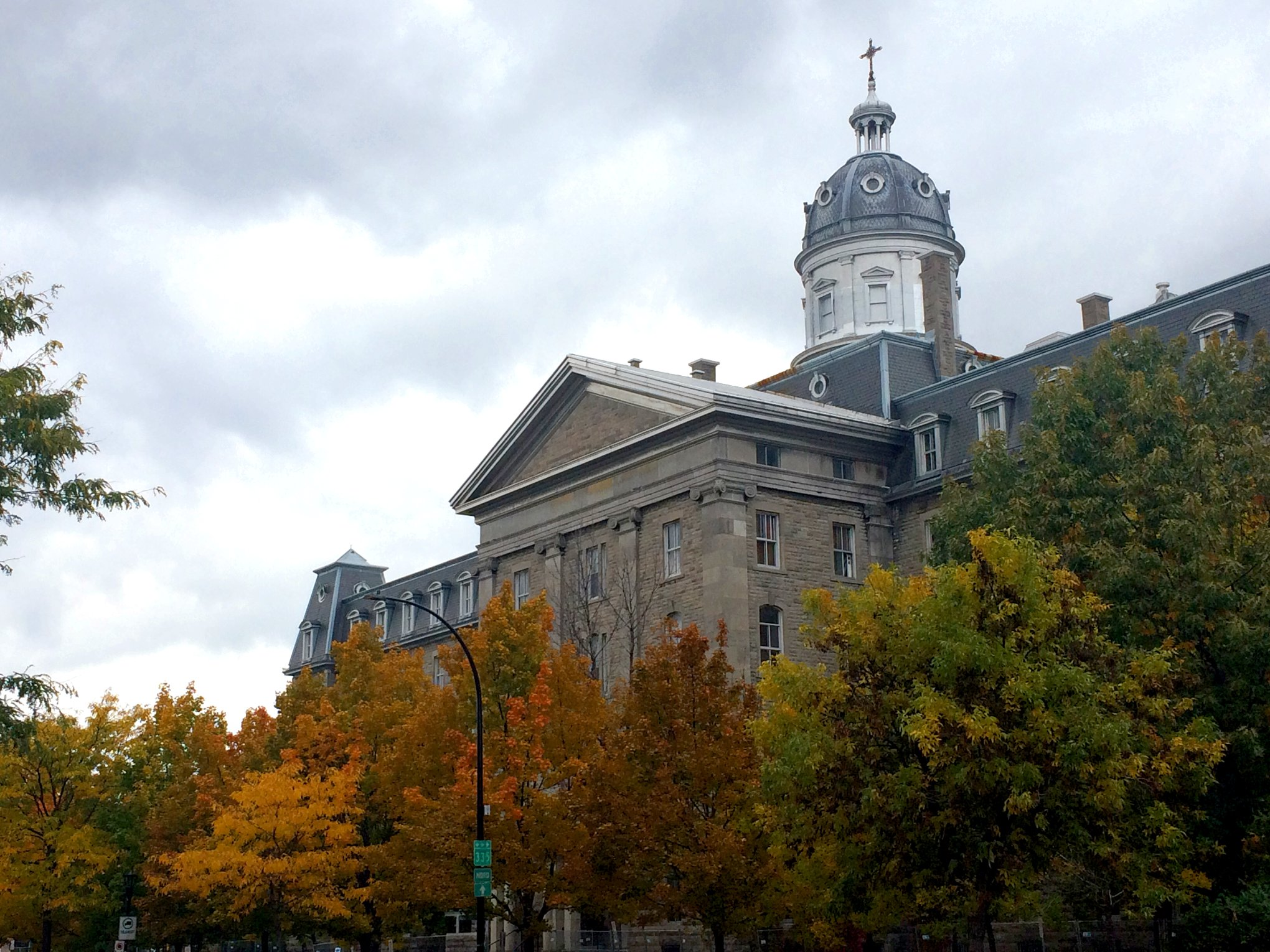
Montreal Institute for the Deaf and Mute building (2019).

The Montreal Institute for the Deaf and Mute was a boarding school operated by the Clercs de Saint-Viateur (English: Clerics of St Viator) between 1848 and 1983 in Montreal, Quebec.

== History ==
The Montreal Institute for the Deaf was founded as L'Institut catholique des Sourds-Muets (The Catholic School for Deaf Boys) in 1848 in Faubourg, Quebec, a neighbourhood in the northeastern corner of Montreal. In 1850, the Institute moved to the Mile End area, at the corner of Boulevard St-Joseph and Rue Saint Dominique in Montreal. By 1887, workshops for teaching the trades such as bookbinding, shoemaking and printing had been built within the school.

In the 1921, the Institute moved to a new building at 7400 Boulevard Saint-Laurent in Montreal. The building is now listed as a heritage building by the City of Montreal.

In 1983, the Institute ceased teaching at the 7400 Boulevard Saint-Laurent location.

The following year, the Institut catholique des Sourds-Muets changed its name to L'Institut Raymond-Dewar (English: The Raymond Dewar Institute).

== Sexual abuse settlement ==
In 2012, 60 former students of the Institute filed a class action suit claiming they were sexually abused by priests in the school. The initial class action was joined by other former students, bringing the total number of plaintiffs claiming abuse to 150 students with claims of abuse ranging between 1942 and 1982. The claims by former students were not legally contested by the Clerics of St Viator. This led to a settlement in 2016 of $30 million from the Clerics of St Viator and the Raymond Dewar Institute. The settlement was the largest settlement ever awarded for a sexual abuse case in Quebec history. The settlement, authorized in the Superior Court of Quebec, provided for a payment of $20 million from the Canadian Clerics of St. Viator, and $10 million from the Raymond Dewar Institute, the name the school adopted in 1984.

== See also ==
- Clerics of St Viator
