= Rawdon, Quebec =

Rawdon
- Municipality
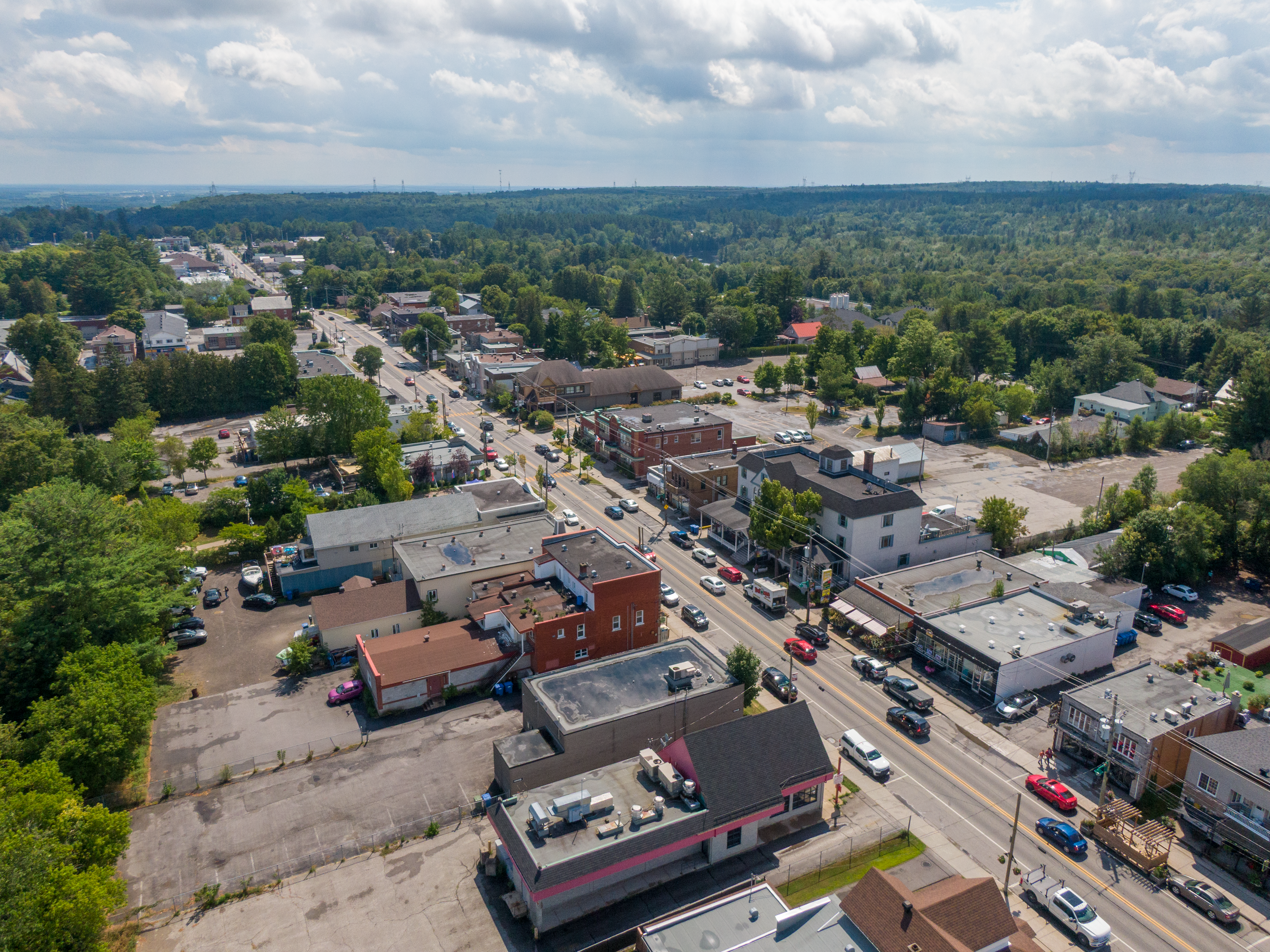
- Rawdon in 2025

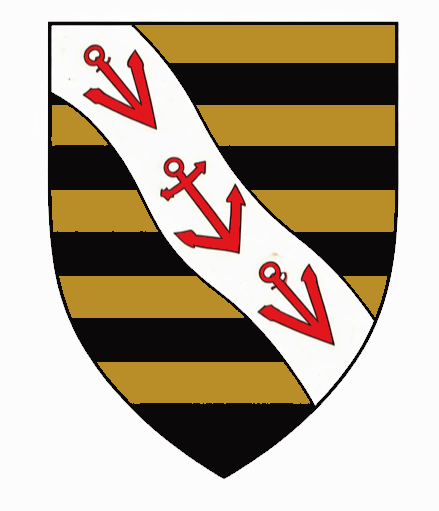
- Coat of arms
- Motto: "In diversitate luceo" (Latin for, "I shine in diversity")
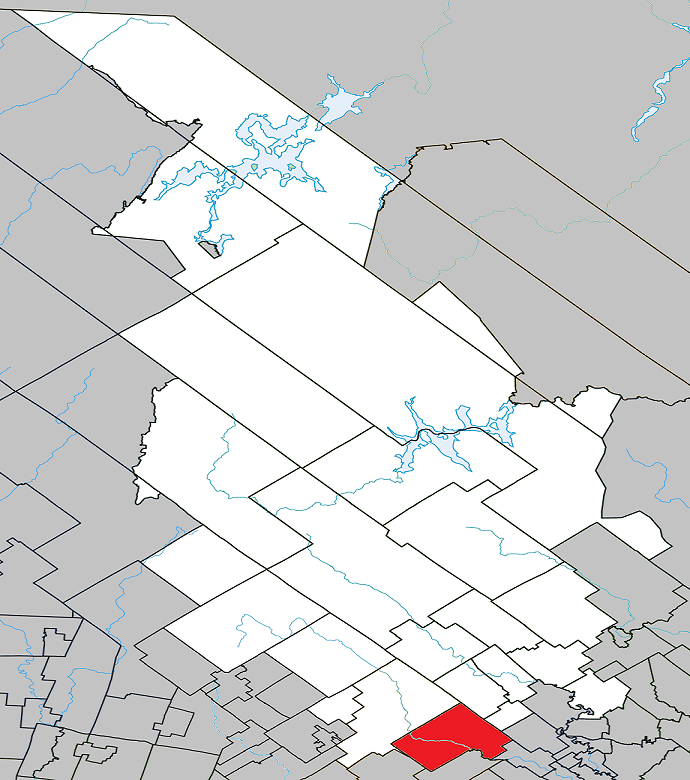
- Location within Matawinie RCM.

- Location in central Quebec.
- Coordinates: 46°03′N 73°43′W
- Country: Canada
- Province: Quebec
- Region: Lanaudière
- RCM: Matawinie
- Settled: 1799
- Constituted: May 28, 1998

Government
  - Mayor: Raymond Rougeau
  - Fed. riding: Joliette—Manawan
  - Prov. riding: Bertrand

Area
  - Municipality: 193.00 km^{2} (74.52 sq mi)
  - Land: 185.38 km^{2} (71.58 sq mi)
  - Urban: 7.68 km^{2} (2.97 sq mi)

Population (2021)
  - Municipality: 11,719
  - Density: 63.2/km^{2} (164/sq mi)
  - Urban: 5,680
  - Urban density: 739.7/km^{2} (1,916/sq mi)
  - Pop 2016-2021: ▲6.0%
  - Dwellings: 6,109
- Time zone: UTC−5 (EST)
  - Summer (DST): UTC−4 (EDT)
- Postal code(s): J0K 1S0
- Area codes: 450, 579
- Highways: R-125 R-337; R-341 R-348
- Website: www.rawdon.ca

Rawdon is a municipality located on the Ouareau River in southwestern Quebec, Canada, about 60 kilometres north of Montreal. It is the seat for the Regional County Municipality of Matawinie, in the Lanaudière region. Rawdon is part of the Joliette federal electoral district.

== History ==
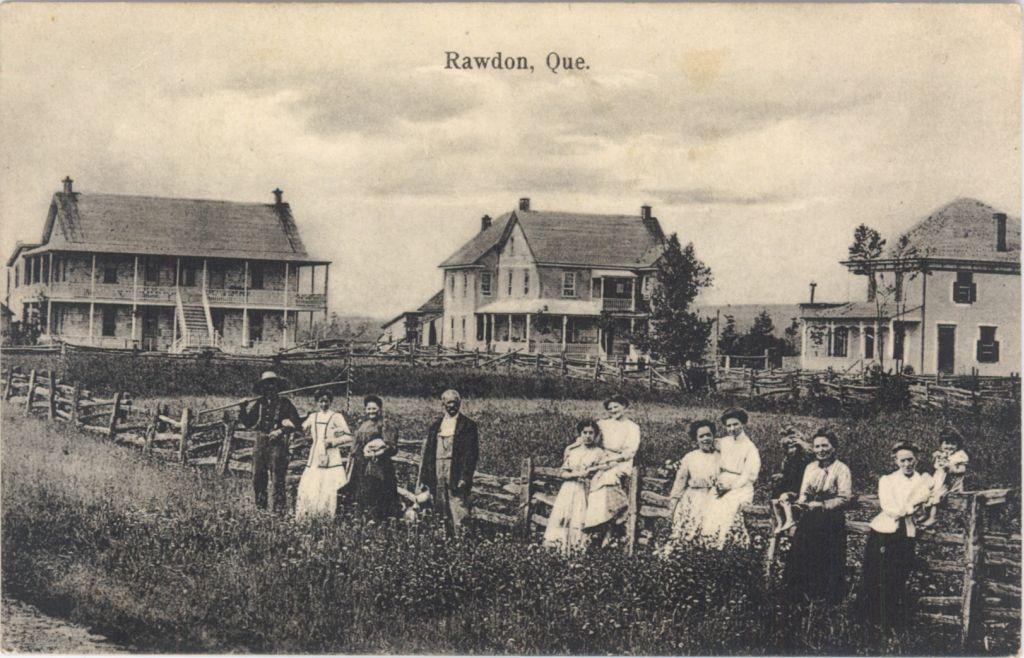
Rawdon, circa 1910

The township was established in 1799 and named after Sir Francis Rawdon-Hastings, 1st Marquess of Hastings. The town was primarily home to people of Irish background up until 1844, when more and more French-Canadians settled the region and small shops and industries emerged.

After the First World War and the October Revolution, Rawdon saw a considerable number of Russian, Ukrainian, and Belarusian noble families arrive to settle in its countryside from the Polish–Lithuanian Commonwealth. Rawdon was originally part of Montcalm County.

From 1920 to 1998, there were two separate municipalities named "Rawdon," the Township of Rawdon and the Village of Rawdon; in 1998, they were united into a single municipality. On November 8, 2021, former pro-wrestler Raymond Rougeau was elected mayor.

== Geography ==
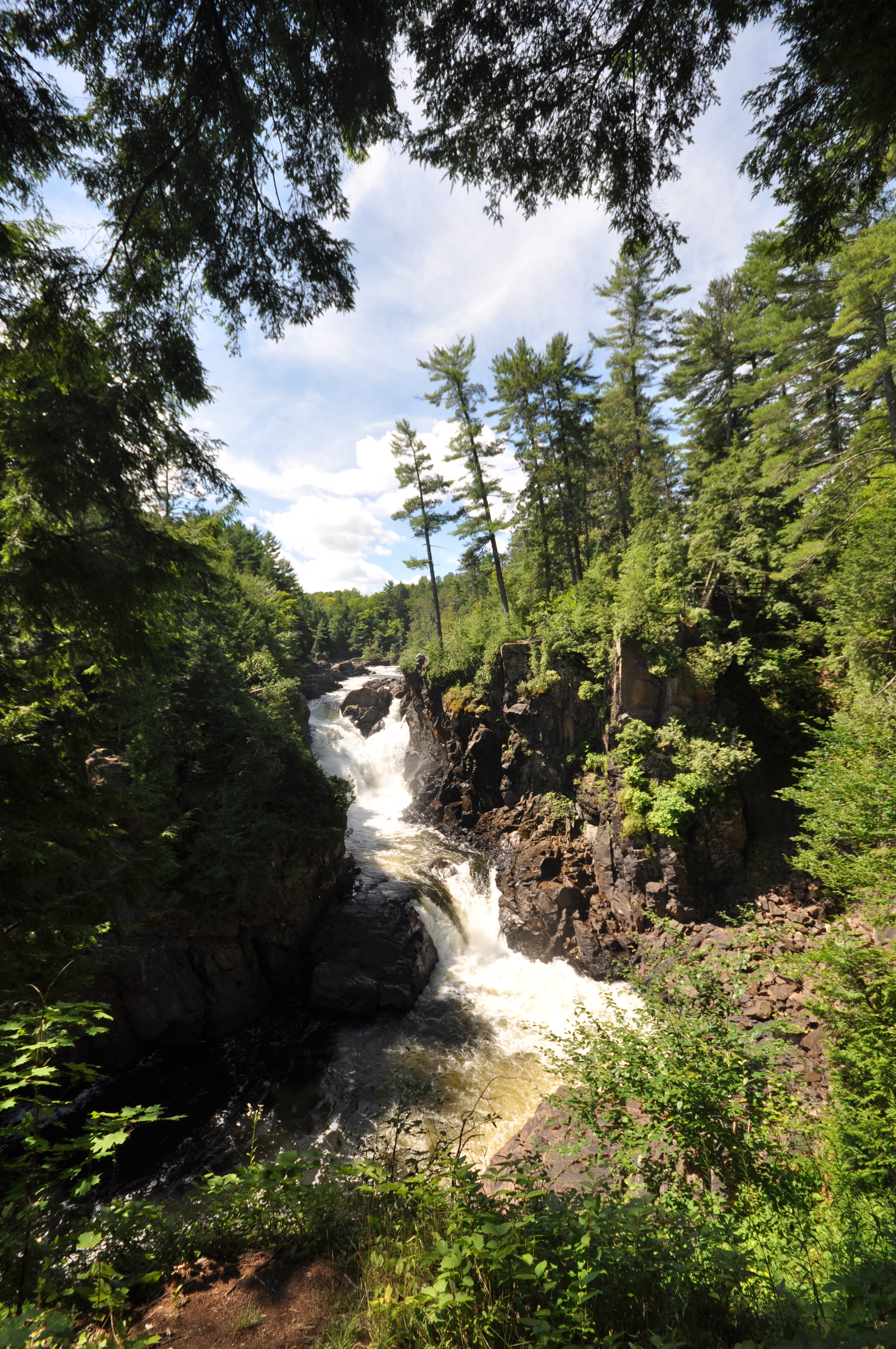
Dorwin Falls, Rawdon

Rawdon is located at the south edge of the Canadian Shield mountains. Its lakes and mountains make it a destination for summer tourism with its many camps and cottages. It is also home to a number of natural landmarks, including Dorwin Falls, Cascades Park, Manchester Falls and a municipal beach.

In summer, temperatures can soar as high as 35 °C (95 °F) while temperatures as cold as −30 °C (−22 °F) can be felt in winter.

The nearest mountain to Rawdon is Mont Pontbriand.

== Demographics ==
=== Population ===
Historical Census Data - Rawdon, Quebec
| Year | Pop. | ±% |
|---|---|---|
| 2001 | 8,648 | — |
| 2006 | 10,058 | +16.3% |
| 2011 | 10,416 | +3.6% |
| 2016 | 11,057 | +6.2% |
| 2021 | 11,719 | +6.0% |
Source: Statistics Canada

In summer, the population is said to increase drastically due to tourism and the presence of many cottages in the vicinity.

Private dwellings occupied by usual residents (2021): 5,447 (total dwellings: 6,109)

=== Language ===
Mother tongue (2021):

- English as first language: 8.8%
- French as first language: 85.7%
- English and French as first language: 2.2%
- Other as first language: 3.2%

== Education ==
Commission scolaire des Samares operates francophone public schools:

- École Ste-Anne (primary)
- École St-Louis (primary)
- École secondaire des Chutes (secondary)

A private francophone school is also offered:

- Collège Champagneur (secondary)

Sir Wilfrid Laurier School Board operates anglophone public schools:

- Rawdon Elementary School
- Joliette Elementary School
- Joliette High School in Joliette

== Notable people ==
- Ludmilla Chiriaeff, (1924-1996), ballet artist
- Martin Deschamps, singer
- Firmin Dugas (1830-1889), businessman and politician
- Jonathan Girard, former Boston Bruins hockey player
- Jean-Paul Jeannotte (1926–2021), operatic tenor, academic teacher and opera administrator

== See also ==
- Canadiana Village
- List of anglophone communities in Quebec
- List of municipalities in Quebec
