= Teaching order =

A teaching order is a Catholic religious institute whose particular charism is education. Many orders and societies sponsor educational programs and institutions, and teaching orders participate in other charitable and spiritual activities; a teaching order is distinguished in that education is a primary mission.

== Description ==
Teaching orders may operate their own institutions, from primary school through the university level, provide staff to diocesan or other Catholic schools, or otherwise contribute to educational ministries.

Such teaching orders include the following:

- Apostolic Carmel Sisters (Congregation of the Apostolic Carmel)
- Basilian Fathers (Congregation of St. Basil)
- Brigidine Sisters
- Brotherhood of Hope - evangelization at secular universities
- Brothers of Our Lady of Lourdes - education of youth
- Carmelites of Mary Immaculate - seminaries and training of priests; education of youth
- Christian Brothers (Irish) (Congregation of Christian Brothers) - education of the materially poor
- Congregation of Saint Thérèse of Lisieux
- De La Salle Christian Brothers (Institute of the Brothers of the Christian Schools)
- Dominicans (Order of Preachers)
- Gabrielite Brothers (Brothers of Christian Instruction of St Gabriel) - education of youth
- Grey Ursulines (Congregation of the Ursulines of the Agonizing Heart of Jesus)
- Society of the Holy Child Jesus - education of youth in a nurturing environment
- Congregation of Holy Cross - education of youth, especially in matters of faith
- Holy Ghost Fathers, or Spiritans (Congregation of the Holy Spirit)
- Religious Teachers Filippini (Pontifical Institute of the Religious Teachers Filippini) - education of youth and of adults, especially women
- Jesuits (Society of Jesus)
- Josephites, or Brown Joeys (Sisters of St Joseph of the Sacred Heart) - education of the poor and in rural areas
- Loreto Sisters (Institute of the Blessed Virgin Mary)
- Loretto Community (Sisters of Loretto)
- Marianists (Society of Mary) - education of youth
- Marianites of Holy Cross - evangelization through education
- Marist Brothers (Little Brothers of Mary) - education of youth, especially the "most neglected"
- Piarists (Order of Poor Clerks Regular of the Mother of God of the Pious Schools) - education of youth
- Presentation Brothers (Congregation of Presentation Brothers) - "Presentation Brothers: Teaching". Archived from the original on November 5, 2009.
- Presentation Sisters (Sisters of the Presentation of the Blessed Virgin Mary) - education in parochial schools
- Religious of the Virgin Mary - education of youth especially women
- Sacred Heart Brothers - education of youth
- Salesians of Don Bosco - education and evangelization of youth
- School Sisters of Notre Dame
- Sisters of Charity of New York - education in a "caring environment"
- Sisters of Charity of Saint Elizabeth
- Sisters of Charity of Seton Hill
- Sisters of Charity of the Blessed Virgin Mary
- Sisters of the Holy Names of Jesus and Mary
- Sisters of Holy Cross - education of the underserved
- Sisters of Notre Dame de Namur
- Sisters, Servants of the Immaculate Heart of Mary
- Sisters of Saint Paul of Chartres
- Sulpicians (Society of Saint-Sulpice) - education of clergy
- Viatorians (Clerics of Saint Viator)
- Xaverian Brothers (Congregation of St. Francis Xavier) - education of youth

== See also ==
- Mendicant order
- Missionary order
