= Jarry Park =

Urban park in Montreal, Canada

- Parc Jarry
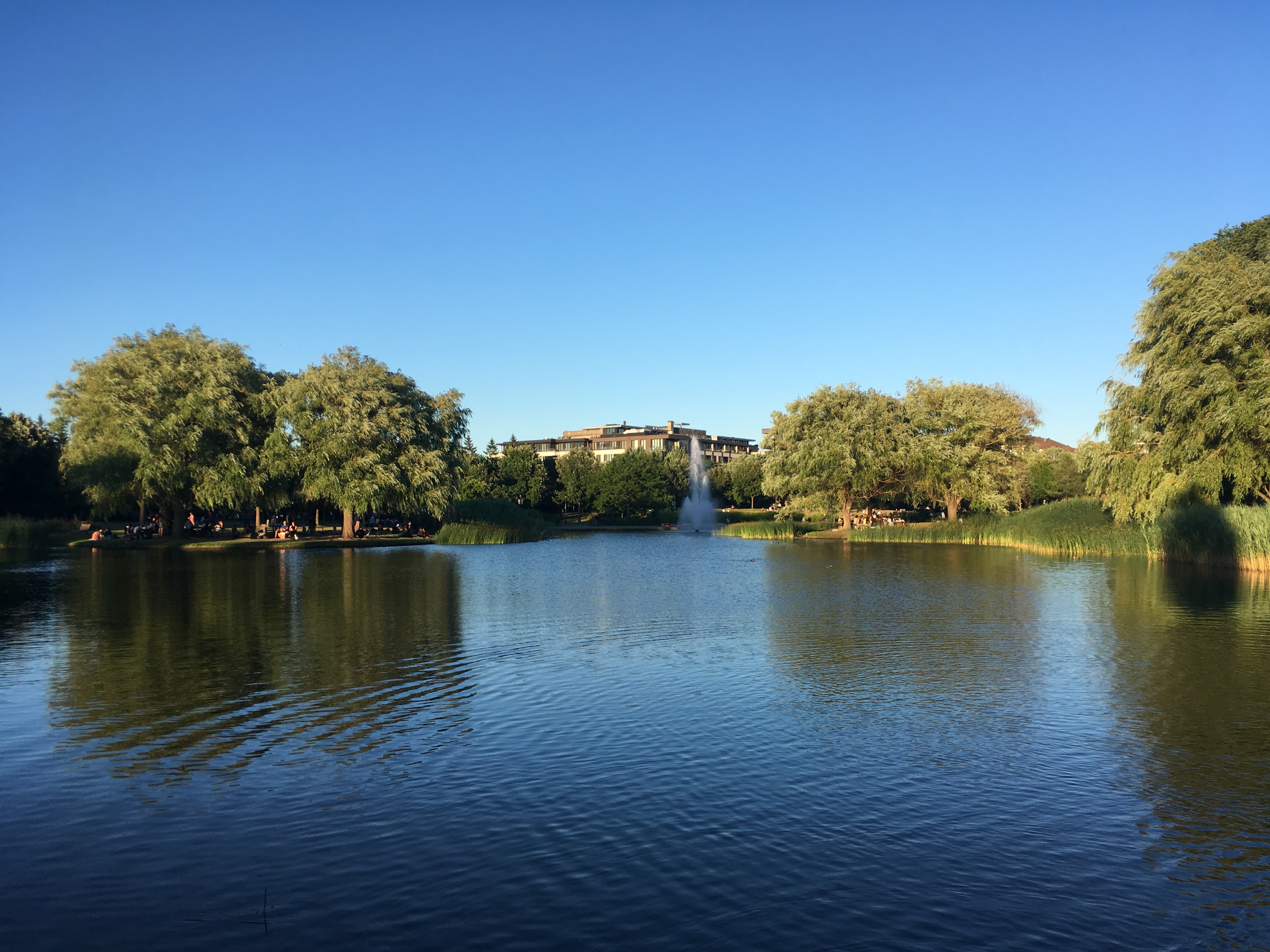
- The lake in the park
- Interactive map of Jarry Park
- Type: Urban park
- Location: Villeray–Saint-Michel–Parc-Extension, Montreal, Quebec, Canada
- Coordinates: 45°32′06″N 73°37′42″W
- Area: 36 hectares (89 acres)
- Operator: City of Montreal
- Open: 6:00 a.m. to 12:00 a.m.
- Status: Open all year
- Public transit: Parc, De Castelnau; at Jarry station; STM Bus: 16, 55, 80, 92, 93, 193, 363, 365, 372 and 480; Parc (Exo)
- Website: Parc Jarry

Jarry Park is an urban park in the Villeray–Saint-Michel–Parc-Extension borough of Montreal, Quebec, Canada. Jarry Park has total area of 36 hectares. It is considered by the City of Montreal as one of its large parks.

From 1969 to 1976, the former Jarry Park Stadium (located in the southwest corner of the park, now IGA Stadium) was the home of the Montreal Expos, Canada's first Major League Baseball team. In 1984 it also hosted a Mass by Pope John Paul II. There is now a hall dedicated to him in District Police Station 31 (Villeray).

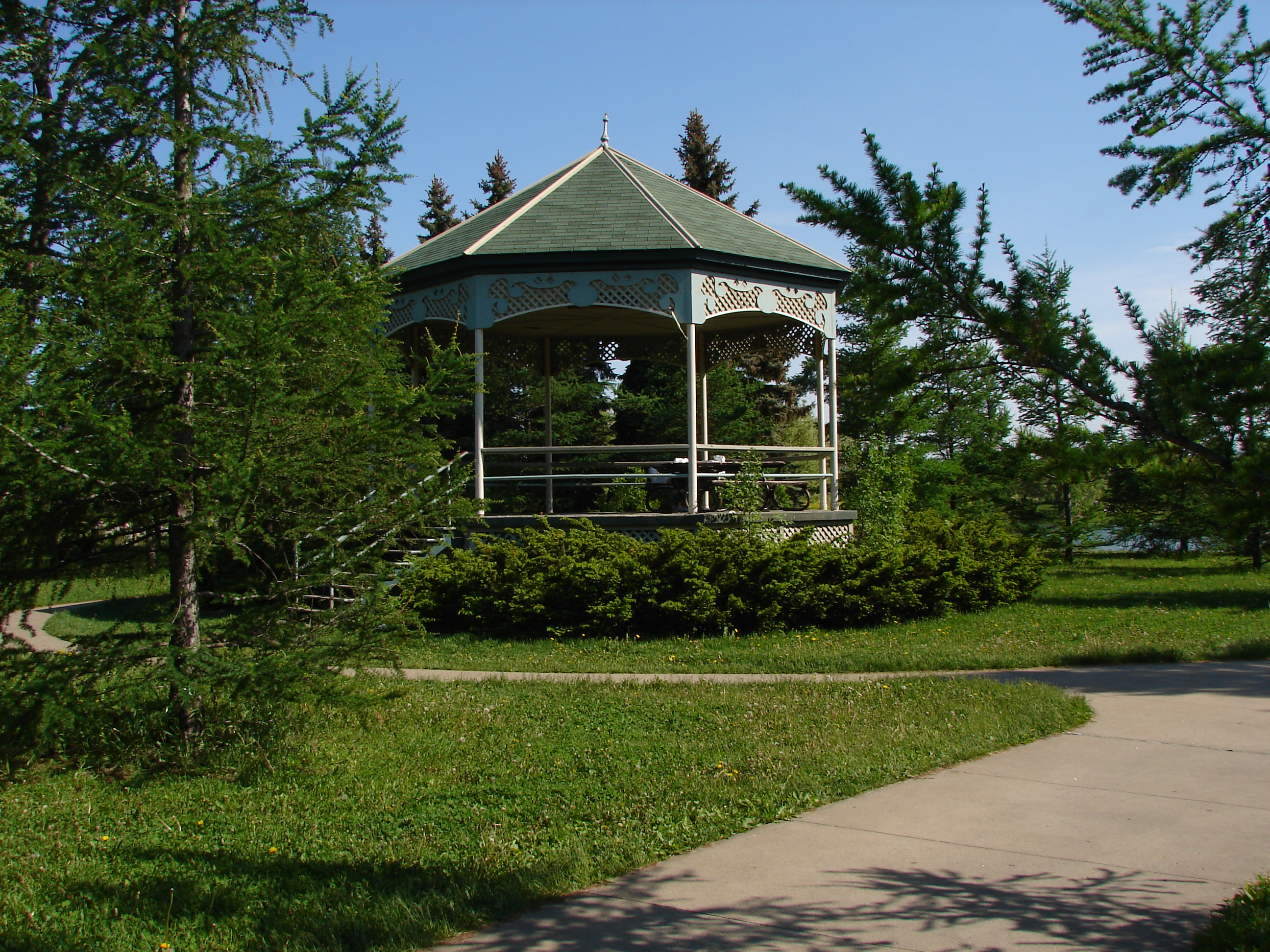
Gazebo in Jarry Park

Facilities include softball, hockey, beach volleyball, cricket and soccer fields, a skate park, table tennis, tennis and basketball courts, a public pool, bocce and pétanque lanes, and an artificial lake, used for ice skating during the winter. In addition, there is a monument called "Paix des enfants" ("Children's Peace"), consisting of violent toys fused together.

The park is bordered by Rue Jarry to the north, Boulevard Saint-Laurent to the east, and the Canadian Pacific rail tracks to the west. On the south it is bordered by Rue Gary-Carter (formerly Rue Faillon), named in honour of the Hall of Fame catcher for the Montreal Expos.

The park was named in honour of Raoul Jarry (1885–1930), a member of Montreal's City Council.

On 24 June 1965, Jarry Park hosted the show for Saint-Jean-Baptiste Day, the French-Canadian annual celebration day. That year, Jarry Park was chosen to present the most important event of the celebrations. 40,000 people came to hear some of Québec's most acclaimed singers, namely Pauline Julien, Clémence DesRochers, Jean-Pierre Ferland, Christine Charbonneau, Hervé Brousseau, Les Cailloux, Pierre Calvé, Renée Claude, and Pierre Létourneau.
