= Viator of Lyons =

Fourth-century Gallic saint

Saint Viator of Lyons
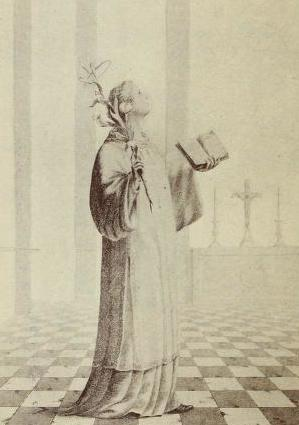
- Died: c. 389 AD; Scetes, Egypt
- Venerated in: Catholic Church
- Feast: 21 October

Viator of Lyons (died c. 389 AD) is a Gallic saint of the fourth century.

== History ==
The name "Viator" in Latin originally meant "traveller by road". In Roman law, the word came to designate a minor court official who went out to summon people to appear before the magistrate. This might have been Viator's prior occupation, or refer to his family of origin. According to tradition, he was a lector or a catechist at the Lyon Cathedral, and was held in high esteem by the bishop of Lyon, Justus ('Just" in French), and by the congregants. Around 381 Justus decided to live as a hermit in Egypt and Viator knowing his intentions, decided to follow his bishop and master. He caught up with the bishop at Marseille, and together they boarded ship for Egypt. They died at a monastery of Scetes (present-day Wadi El Natrun) in AD 389.

== Veneration ==
Their relics were translated to Lyon (the day is recorded as September 2). By the fifth century four feast days were celebrated annually in Lyon in honor of Sts Justus and Viator. Their remains lie in the church of St. Justus in Lyon.

His feast day is October 21.

== Legacy ==
The Clerics of Saint Viator take their name from him.

== St Justus of Lyon ==
Justus was born in Vivarais and became a deacon of the Church of Vienne. Sometime after 343, he was chosen to succeed Bishop Verissimus, as bishop of Lyon. In 374, Bishop Justus assisted at regional Council at Valence. In 382, he attended the Council of Aquileia, as one of the two representatives of the Bishops of Gaul.

Shortly after returning from the Council of Aquileia, Bishop Justus confided to Viator his intention to abandon the See of Lyon in order to take up the ascetical life a monk in the desert of Scete in Egypt. This decision seems to have motivated by a number of factors: his character, that of a mild studious and contemplative man; his age, for he had been a bishop many years and it seems he was already in his sixties; and by a sad event which had occurred in Lyon a short time before.

A mad man had raced through the market place of the city, slashing wildly with a sword, and wounding and killing many citizens. He then dashed to the cathedral and claimed the right of sanctuary. A mob gathered to storm the church. Bishop Justus intervened, but on being assured that the man would be given a fair trial he agreed to hand the man over. No sooner had this been done, than the mob seized the man from the magistrate's guard, and killed him on the spot. The bishop came to believe that his failure to adequately protect the murderer had made him unworthy to continue to lead the Christian community, and he resolved to devote the remainder of his life to doing penance.

In 381 Bishop Justus secretly left Lyon for Marseille, where he set sail for Alexandria in Egypt. Once there, they joined the community of monks in the desert of Scetes, about 40 or 50 miles south of Alexandria, beyond the mountains of Nitria, in the Libyan Desert. At that time the leader or abbot of this community was St. Macarius of Egypt (or the Elder) († 390), a disciple of one of the founders of monasticism in Egypt, St. Anthony († 356). Macarius had a reputation for great holiness and a fierce asceticism. Most of the monks lived in cells, either dug in the ground or built of stones, and each out of sight of others. They came together only on Saturdays to celebrate the liturgy. They supported themselves by manual labor, and ate only the poorest of foods. Fasting, prayer, silence, and the keeping of night vigils, characterized their lives. Bishop Justus died around 389.
