= Clerics of Saint Viator =

Roman Catholic religious congregation

- Congregatio Clericorum Parochialium seu Catechistarum S. Viatoris (Latin)
- Abbreviation: C.S.V. (post-nominal letters)
- Nickname: Viatorians
- Formation: November 3, 1831; 194 years ago
- Founder: Rev. Louis Joseph Querbes, C.S.V.
- Founded at: Lyon, France
- Type: Clerical Religious Congregation of Pontifical Right (for Men)
- Headquarters: Via Padre Angelo Paoli 41, Rome, Italy
- Members: 407 members (includes 172 priests) as of 2020
- Patron: Saint Viator of Lyons
- Superior General: Rev. Nestor Fils-Aimé, C.S.V.
Countries present
Burkina Faso Canada; Chile Colombia France; Haiti	Honduras Ivory Coast Japan; Peru; Spain; United States
- Ministry: Educational, parochial, mission, campus ministry and chaplaincy works
- Parent organization: Catholic Church
- Website: www.viatorians.com

The Clerics of Saint Viator (French: Clercs de Saint-Viateur), abbreviated C.S.V. and also known as the Viatorians is a Catholic clerical religious congregation of Pontifical Right for men (priest, brothers and lay associates) founded in Lyon, France, in 1831 by Father Louis Querbes. Its patron, Saint Viator, was a 4th-century catechist in Lyon. The institute spread from its origins in France to Canada and later to the United States; it now has provinces and missions all over the world. They are a teaching order and are involved in parish ministries and all levels of education, from grade school through university. Its members add the nominal letters C.S.V. after their names to indicate membership in the congregation.

== Louis Querbes ==
Louis Querbes was born in Lyon, France, on 21 August 1793, during the French Revolution. He was baptized in Saint Nizier Parish near the Sanctuary of Our Lady of Fourvière. As a boy he participated in the choir and attended the clerical school in Saint Nizier Parish.

Querbes entered Saint Irenaeus Seminary and was ordained in 1816. He returned to Saint Nizier as a parochial vicar and became a skilled preacher. He became administrator of the clerical school at Saint Nizier.

In 1822, Louis Joseph Querbes was named pastor of Vourles, a parish that had suffered during the Revolution. He took on the task of rebuilding the church and preaching to the faithful. He noted a lack of educational opportunities for the children there.

== The Congregation of the Clerics of St. Viator ==
=== History ===
Father Querbes formed an association of catechists for rural schools: "The Catechists of Saint Viator". He chose as patron Viator of Lyon, a fourth-century local saint who was a lector serving Bishop Just of Lyon. The religious Congregation of the Clerics of Saint Viator, made up of parochial clerics and lay catechists, was approved in 1831 by Archbishop Gaston de Pins, Apostolic Administrator of Lyons. Seven years later, he presented his society to the Pope but, counseled by advisors, he had dropped the inclusion of lay members, as it would not have been approved. Father Querbes was ahead of his time in wanting to form a community of lay and religious members. On 21 September 1838, he received pontifical approval for the religious institute of the Parochial Clerics or Catechists of Saint Viator.

The Viatorians opened schools and worked in parishes first in France, and later in Canada and the United States. Father Louis Querbes died in Vourles 1 September 1859, but his work and charity continued after his death. At the death of its founder, the Congregation numbered between 250 and 300 members, including some fifty in Canada. They constituted four provinces: Vourles, Saint-Flour, Rodez, and Canada.

=== 19th century ===
After the death of Father Querbes and up until about 1880, the movement continued to grow. In France, the typical Cleric of Saint Viator served in small rural parishes, where he was, according to the wishes of the founder, "the cantor, sacristan, catechist, table-mate, and companion" of the priest and the principal of the school. Afterward, as the country entered an era of political turbulence, religious congregations that, up until that time, could direct public communal schools had to abandon them. They opened parish schools, which were free but poor. Members were obliged to do military service. The number entering novitiates declined. In 1900, there were approximately 500 French members of the 760 members in the entire Congregation.

Clerics of the Province of Canada went in a different direction, directing primary schools as well as secondary schools, accepting responsibility for a parish, and creating an Institution for the Deaf. The development of the Congregation proceeded based upon apostolic works. In 1897, a half-century after its founding, the Canadian chapter was composed of 215 members.

In 1865, three Canadian members founded a school in Bourbonnais, Illinois, in the United States; this school later developed as St. Viator College. A novitiate was opened, and in 1882, the members of the United States formed the Province of Chicago. At the end of the century, the Chicago Province was composed of about forty members.

Until the beginning of the twentieth century, the members of France formed the predominant group in the Congregation. Except for the Chicago Province, the other provinces were engaged in apostolic works that fit into the same framework: elementary schools, some of which were small boarding schools, which represented the principal commitment of the Congregation; several secondary schools, which involved a small number of members; social works (orphanages in France, the Montreal Institute for the Deaf); and sacristan duties in several parishes. Small or medium-sized local communities predominated and consisted for the most part of religious brothers.

=== 1903-1908 ===
In May 1903, in France, the government decreed closing 11,000 schools and hospitals administered by religious congregations. Within the space of two months, the Clerics of Saint Viator of France saw their provincial houses, juniorates, novitiates, and residences for retired members closed and their personnel dispersed. All primary and secondary schools were affected; many of them disappeared. All properties of the Congregation were seized by the State; communities fell apart. Certain members went before tribunals and were sentenced to prison. Other members, especially those who were somewhat older, left for other countries.

Belgium became a possible place of refuge for the members of the Province of Vourles, while Spain played the same role for those of the Province of Rodez. The Province of Canada indicated that, in case of necessity, it would welcome French confreres; 31 accepted Canada's hospitality. The provinces tried to re-establish themselves gradually. All the schools were free and run by laypeople. To support themselves, the organization took part in gardening and farming operations, a tailor shop for religious garb, and sold objects of piety. In Brussels, Belgium, and Vitoria, Spain, new schools were opened. When World War I broke out, about half of the French members were drafted; 29 of them were killed in battle. This time period corresponded with the decline of the French influence upon the Congregation. By 1907–1908, the number of North American members was greater than the number of European members.

=== 1920s-1960s ===
From the 1920s until the 1960s, the number of Canadian members grew steadily and eventually constituted two-thirds of the Congregation's membership (1,146 out of 1,760 in the year 1960). They set up several classical secondary schools, including in Joliette and Rigaud, as well as specialized institutions for the hearing impaired in Montreal and Quebec, and for the blind in Montreal. This resulted in members moving east toward the mouth of the Saint Lawrence River, north toward the regions of Abitibi and Témiscamingue, and west toward the Province of Manitoba. Several members, in 1931, went abroad to found a school in Manchuria. Also in 1931, the Brothers of Our Lady of the Fields was merged into the Clerics of Saint Viator.

Because of its growth, the Canadian Province was divided into smaller provinces: in 1938 provinces of Montreal and Joliette were established; in 1955 Abitibi and Saint Lawrence were founded). Over the years, Canadian members introduced the Congregation to Japan (1948), Taiwan (1953), Peru (1959), and Haiti (1965).

In 1928 members of the Chicago Province petitioned for beatification of the organization's founder, Louis Querbes. The Great Depression took a toll on the Province; Viator College was unable meets its financial obligations and closed in 1938.

Members of the Province of Chicago served in large educational institutions, universities, chaplaincies, and parishes. The Chicago Province founded a school in Bogotá, Colombia, in 1961. A church was set up in Las Vegas, Nevada in 1955, where the Clerics taught at a newly opened high school.

The French provinces re-organized gradually; their apostolic commitments remained unchanged. They became involved with parishes and collaborated with the diocesan clergy. In 1955, French members founded a school in Bouaké, Ivory Coast.

The Clerics moved into Spain, slowly at first but more solidly after 1920. In spite of the interruptions caused by the Civil War (1936–1939), the local communities in Spain formed a vice-province in 1937; ten years later, they became a full-fledged province. Starting in 1957, Spain founded several establishments in Chile.

=== 1960s-1970s ===
Vatican Council II brought renewed emphasis on the questions and challenges that were present everywhere in the late 1960s. Problems within institutions and communities led many members to leave the Clerics of Saint Viator. Reflections that began at the 1969 and 1972 General Chapters resulted in the drafting of a renewed Constitution (1978) that refocused the organization on its mission and the religious life of the Clerics of Saint Viator.

During the renewal process, the congregation decided to accept lay associates, both men and women, into the community. This had been part of Father Louis Querbes' original concept. The degree to which non-clerics participate varies among the local communities.

=== 2000s ===
In 2010 and 2011, the Clerics organized and hosted a Youth Congress in Arlington Heights, Illinois.

In 2012, a number of former students of the Montreal Institute for the Deaf operated by the Viatorians in Montreal, Canada made public their claims of sexual abuse by priests at the institute. In 2016, the Clerics of St Viateur, who operated the institute, agreed to a $30 million (CAD) payment to settle the claims. The settlement was the largest ever awarded in Quebec for a sexual abuse case.

As of 2018 the Clerics of St. Viator continue to provide education and shelter for youth.

== Viatorian schools ==
=== Canada ===
- Collège Bourget (Rigaud, Quebec)
- Collège Champagneur (Rawdon, Quebec)
- Montreal Institute for the Deaf (Montreal, Quebec, closed)

=== Chile ===
- Colegio San Viator de Ovalle (Ovalle)
- Colegio San Viator de Macul (Macul)

=== Colombia ===
- Colegio San Viator (Bogotá)
- Parroquia San Basilio Magno, Diocese of Engativá (Bogotá)
- Parroquia San Juan Maria Vianney, Archdiocese of Bogotá (Bogotá)

=== Haïti ===
- L'institution Saint-François d'Assise de Grand-Goave (ISFAGG) (Grand-Goâve)

=== Japan ===
- St. Viator Rakusei Junior and Senior High School (Kyoto)

=== Spain ===
- Colegio San Viator de Madrid (Madrid)
- Colegio San José (Basauri, Biscay)

=== Taiwan ===
- Viator Catholic High School (Taichung City)

=== United States ===
- Columbus College, (Chamberlain, South Dakota and Sioux Falls, operated 1909–1929).
- St. Edward Grammar School (Chicago, Illinois)
- Bishop Gorman High School (Summerlin, Nevada)
- St. Viator College (Bourbonnais, Illinois, closed)
- St. Viator Elementary School (Chicago, Illinois)
- Saint Viator High School (Arlington Heights, Illinois, adjacent to its American provincialate)
- St. Viator School (Paradise, Nevada)

== Superiors General ==
The following have served as head of the institute as is its superior general:

- 1972–1984 Rev. Thomas Langenfeld, C.S.V.
- 1984–1986: Rev. Jacques Berthelet, C.S.V.
- 2000–2012: Rev. Mark R. Francis, C.S.V.
- 2012–2018: Rev. Alain Ambeault, C.S.V.
- 2018–2024: Rev. Robert M. Egan, C.S.V.
- 2024–present: Rev. Nestor Fils-Aimé, C.S.V.

== See also ==
- Cyrille Beaudry

== Additional sources ==
- The Canadian Encyclopedia - Clerics of Saint Viator
- The Catholic Encyclopedia: An International Work of Reference.. by Charles George Herbermann, Edward Aloysius Pace, Condé Bénoist Pallen, Thomas Joseph Shahan, John Joseph Wynne. Published 1913, Robert Appleton Co., p. 400
- Santerre, David (29 June 2013). "Trois Clercs de Saint-Viateur accusés d'agressions sexuelles" [Three Clerics of Saint-Viateur accused of sexual assault]. La Presse. Montreal.
