= 2023 Canadian electoral calendar =

2023 elections in Canada

This is a list of elections in Canada that were held in 2023. Included are municipal, provincial and federal elections, by-elections on any level, referendums and party leadership races at any level.

== January–March ==
- January 8: 2023 Yukon Liberal Party leadership election (acclamation)
- January 13: Municipal by-election in Ryley, Alberta
- January 23: Conseil scolaire Viamonde and Conseil scolaire catholique MonAvenir by-elections
- January 25: Tsawwassen First Nation by-election
- February 4:
  - 2023 Ontario New Democratic Party leadership election (acclamation)
  - Municipal by-election in Sandy Beach, Alberta
- February 6: Prince Albert Roman Catholic School Division by-election in Subdivision-2.
- February 10: Municipal by-election in Devon, Alberta
- February 13: Municipal by-election in Valley Waters, New Brunswick
- February 14: Municipal by-election in Delia, Alberta
- February 19: Municipal by-election in Christ-Roi District, Lévis, Quebec; Mayoral by-election and municipal by-elections in Saint-Sacrement and Trudel Districts, Baie-Comeau, Quebec
- February 23: Municipal by-election in Halkirk, Alberta
- February 25: Municipal by-elections in Peace River Regional District and Salmo, British Columbia
- February 26: Municipal by-election for seat #5, Saint-Hippolyte, Quebec
- February 27: Yukon school referendum
- March 3: Municipal by-election in District 2, Lac-Beauport, Quebec
- March 4: Municipal by-election in Invermere, British Columbia
- March 5: Mayoral by-election in Les Îles-de-la-Madeleine, Quebec
- March 11: Municipal by-election in Alberni-Clayoquot Regional District
- March 12: Municipal by-election in Harrington and in District 5, Otterburn Park, Quebec
- March 13: Saint-Henri–Sainte-Anne, Quebec provincial by-election
- March 16: Hamilton Centre, Ontario provincial by-election
- March 22: Municipal by-election and plebiscite in Regina Beach, Saskatchewan
- March 26: 2023 Green Party of Manitoba leadership election
- March 27: Municipal by-election Fort McPherson, Northwest Territories
- March 28: 2023 Newfoundland and Labrador New Democratic Party leadership election (acclamation)
- March 31: 2023 Conservative Party of British Columbia leadership election (acclamation)

== April–May ==
- April 3:
  - 2023 Prince Edward Island general election
  - Municipal by-election for mayor and councillor in Slave Lake, Alberta
  - Municipal by-election in Division 1, Brazeau County, Alberta
- April 23: Municipal by-election in Cedar/ Le Village District, Pointe-Claire, Quebec
- April 24:
  - Bathurst East-Nepisiguit-Saint-Isidore, New Brunswick provincial by-election
  - Dieppe, New Brunswick provincial by-election
  - Restigouche-Chaleur, New Brunswick provincial by-election
- May 1: Municipal by-election in Linkletter, Prince Edward Island
- May 2: Municipal by-election in Beaverlodge, Alberta
- May 6: Municipal by-election in Lions Bay, British Columbia
- May 14: Municipal by-election in District 1, Rivière-Rouge, Quebec
- May 15: Municipal by-election in Bastard and South Burgess Ward, Rideau Lakes, Ontario
- May 27: Municipal by-election in Capital Regional District (Salt Spring Island Local Community Commission)
- May 28: Municipal by-election for councillors #4 and #5 in Gros-Mécatina, councillor #3 in Saint-Basile, for councillors #3 and #4 in Saint-Camille-de-Lellis, for councillor #1 in Sainte-Mélanie, for councillor #5 in Saint-Michel-du-Squatec and for councillor #5 in Saint-Pie-de-Guire, Quebec
- May 29:
  - 2023 Alberta general election
  - Halton District School Board by-election for Burlington Wards 1&2.
  - Municipal by-election in Ward 3, Summerside and in the Rural Municipality of Victoria, Prince Edward Island
- May 31: Municipal by-elections in Ward 8, Prince Albert and Weyburn, Saskatchewan

== June ==
- June 4:
  - Municipal by-election in District 5, Rosemère, for councillor #2 in Chute-aux-Outardes, for councillor #6 in Hemmingford Township, for councillor #4 in Lamarche, for councillor #5 in La Martre, for councillor #6 in La Reine, for councillors #4 and #6 in L'Avenir, Quebec, for councillor #1 in Laverlochère-Angliers, for councillor #1 in Les Escoumins, for councillor #3 in Marsoui, for councillor #5 in Montcerf-Lytton, for Saint-Éleuthère district (post 2) in Pohénégamook, for mayor and councillor #5 in Ripon, for councillor #6 in Sainte-Angèle-de-Monnoir, for councillor #1 in Sainte-Anne-du-Lac, for councillor #3 in Saint-Barnabé, for mayor and councillor #1 in Saint-Benjamin, for councillors #1 and #4 (deferred to Sep 3 due to no candidates) in Sainte-Jeanne-d'Arc (parish) and for councillor #5 in Thorne, Quebec
  - Eastern Townships School Board Commissioner, District 4 by-election
- June 11: Municipal by-election in de Mgr-Blanche District, Sept-Îles (cancelled), councillors #1 and #3 in Authier-Nord, councillor #6 in Calixa-Lavallée, councillors #3 and #5 in Laforce, councillor #4 in Moffet, councillor #3 in Normétal, councillor #1 in Notre-Dame-de-Bonsecours, councillor #3 in Palmarolle, mayor of Plaisance, councillor #2 in Poularies, councillor #5 in Saint-Aimé-du-Lac-des-Îles, councillor #5 in Saint-Denis-sur-Richelieu, councillors #2 and #4 (deferred to Aug 27 due to no candidates) in Saint-Félix-de-Dalquier, councillor #4 in Saint-Pierre-de-Lamy, councillor #6 in Saint-Ulric and for the Prefect of the Minganie Regional County Municipality, Quebec
- June 17: Prince George School District by-election
- June 18: Municipal by-election for Seat #6 in Wentworth, councillor #4 in Armagh, mayoral by-elections in Biencourt and Cloridorme, mayoral and councillor #3 by-elections in La Corne, mayoral and councillor #6 by-elections in Rémigny, for councillor #6 in Rivière-Éternité, for councillor #5 in Saint-Charles-Garnier, for councillor #4 in Saint-Édouard-de-Maskinongé, for mayor and councillors #1 and #5 in Saint-Élie-de-Caxton, for councillor #5 in Saint-Léonard-de-Portneuf, for mayor and councillor #1 in Saint-Luc-de-Bellechasse, for councillor #3 in Saint-Pierre-de-l'Île-d'Orléans and for mayor and councillor #4 in Wickham, Quebec
- June 19:
  - Municipal by-election in Ward 4, Haldimand County, Ontario
  - Municipal by-election in North Rustico, Prince Edward Island
  - Federal by-elections:
    - Notre-Dame-de-Grâce—Westmount
    - Oxford
    - Portage—Lisgar
    - Winnipeg South Centre
- June 24:
  - Provincial by-elections in British Columbia
    - Langford-Juan de Fuca
    - Vancouver-Mount Pleasant
  - Municipal by-election in District 8, Kings County, Nova Scotia
- June 26: 2023 Toronto mayoral by-election

== July–August ==
- July 5: Municipal by-election in Mundare, Alberta
- July 8: Municipal by-elections in North Saanich and Stewart, British Columbia
- July 9: Municipal by-election for councillor #3 in Franquelin, for councillors #1 and #2 in Notre-Dame-du-Rosaire, for councillor #3 in Rapide-Danseur, for mayor of Sainte-Brigide-d'Iberville and for councillor #6 in Sainte-Émélie-de-l'Énergie, Quebec
- July 16: Municipal by-election in Louis-Laberge District, L'Assomption, for councillor #6 in Hinchinbrooke, for councillor #2 in Lantier, for councillor #3 in Notre-Dame-de-la-Salette, for councillor #5 in Notre-Dame-de-Lorette, for councillor #4 in Saint-Alexandre-des-Lacs, for councillor #4 in Sainte-Élizabeth-de-Warwick, for councillors #1 and #2 in Saint-Léandre, for councillor #5 in Saint-Luc-de-Bellechasse, for councillor #1 in Sainte-Marguerite-Marie, for councillor #2 in Saint-Norbert-d'Arthabaska, for councillors #1 and #3 in Saint-Théophile, for councillor #1 in Stratford and for mayor and councillor #1 in Stukely-Sud, Quebec
- July 23: Municipal by-election for councillors #3 and #4 in Esprit-Saint and for councillor #5 in Saint-Adalbert, Quebec
- July 24: Federal by-election in Calgary Heritage
- July 27: Provincial by-elections in Ontario
  - Kanata—Carleton
  - Scarborough—Guildwood
- July 29: Municipal by-election in Hudson's Hope, British Columbia
- July 30: Municipal by-election for councillor #6 in Causapscal, Quebec
- August 5: Kana:takon District Chief by-election, Mohawk Council of Akwesasne
- August 6: Municipal by-elections for councillors #1, #5 and #6 in Arundel and for councillor #2 in Ripon, Quebec
- August 8: Provincial by-election in Preston, Nova Scotia
- August 10: Provincial by-elections in Saskatchewan
  - Regina Walsh Acres
  - Regina Coronation Park
  - Lumsden-Morse
- August 11: 2023 New Brunswick New Democratic Party leadership election (acclamation)
- August 13: Municipal by-election in District 3, Val-des-Monts and for councillor #4 Martinville, Quebec
- August 16: Nishnawbe Aski Nation Grand Chief by-election (acclamation)
- August 20: Municipal by-election for councillor #1 in Gallichan and for councillor #3 in Saint-Cyprien, Quebec (parish)
- August 26: Mohawk Council of Akwesasne Seaway Claim referendum
- August 27: Municipal by-election for councillor #1 in Chénéville, for councillors #2, #3 and #6 in Lac-des-Plages, for councillor #1 in Lac-Saguay, for councillor #4 in Notre-Dame-Auxiliatrice-de-Buckland, for mayor and councillor #3 in Saint-Edmond-les-Plaines, for councillors #4 and #5 in Saint-Félix-de-Dalquier, for mayor and councillors #2 and #3 in Saint-Marc-sur-Richelieu and for councillor #4 in Saint-Mathieu-de-Rioux, Quebec

== September ==
- September 3: Municipal by-election for councillor #4 in Sainte-Jeanne-d'Arc, Quebec (parish)
- September 6: Municipal by-election in Penhold, Alberta
- September 7: Municipal by-election in Taber, Alberta
- September 10: Municipal by-election for councillor #6 in Calixa-Lavallée and for councillor #3 in Saint-Sévère, Quebec
- September 16: Municipal by-election in Harrison Hot Springs, British Columbia
- September 17: Municipal by-election in Seat 2, Dolbeau-Mistassini, for District 1 in Cookshire-Eaton, for District #1 in Montmagny, for councillor #3 in Saint-Augustin, for councillor #6 in Saint-David, for councillor #2 in Sainte-Euphémie-sur-Rivière-du-Sud, for councillor #3 in Saint-Joseph-de-Coleraine and for councillor #3 in Saint-Pie, Quebec
- September 18:
  - Mayoral and municipal by-election in Alberton, Prince Edward Island
  - Municipal by-election in Ward 2, Norwich, Ontario
- September 24: Municipal by-election for councillor #3 in Biencourt, for councillor #4 in Bolton-Est, for councillors #4 and #5 in La Bostonnais, for councillor #2 in Laurierville, for councillor #5 in Lingwick, for councillor #3 in Piopolis, for mayor and councillor #1 in Saint-Albert, for councillor #3 in Sainte-Brigitte-de-Laval, for councillor #3 in Saint-Charles-Borromée, for councillors #2 and #3 in Sainte-Rose-de-Watford and for councillors #3 and #4 in Stanstead, Quebec
- September 27: Takla Nation council by-election
- September 30:
  - Nisga'a School District by-election
  - Municipal by-election in McBride, British Columbia

== October ==
- October 1: Mayoral and municipal by-election for councillor #2 in Godbout, mayoral and municipal by-election for councillor #3 in Lorrainville, for councillor #5, Saint-André-Avellin, for councillor #3 in Saint-Benoît-Labre, for councillor #2 in Saint-Bruno-de-Guigues, for mayor of Saint-Cyprien, Quebec (parish), for councillors #1 and #3, Saine-Élisabeth, for councillor #2, Saint-Léandre, for councillors #1 and #2 in Saint-Philémon, for councillor #4 in Saint-Roch-des-Aulnaies, for councillor #2 in Saint-Simon-de-Rimouski, for councillor #4 in Saint-Zacharie, for councillor #6 in Tadoussac, for councillor #5 in Témiscaming, and for councillors #1, #2, and #3 in Vaudreuil-sur-le-Lac, Quebec
- October 2: 2023 Jean-Talon provincial by-election
- October 3:
  - 2023 Manitoba general election
  - 2023 Speaker of the House of Commons of Canada election
- October 8: Municipal by-election for councillor #6 in L'Île-Dorval, for councillor #3 in Paspébiac, and for councillors #1, #4, #5, and #6, Sainte-Apolline-de-Patton
- October 13: Public Schools Branch Zone 7 and Commission scolaire de langue française Zone 2 by-elections
- October 14:
  - Sooke School District by-election
  - 2023 Progressive Conservative Party of Newfoundland and Labrador leadership election
- October 15: Municipal by-election for mayor and councillor #3 in Berthierville, de l'Anse District, L'Île-Perrot, Murray District, Pointe-Lebel, councillor #1, Sainte-Marguerite-Marie, Quebec
- October 22:
  - Municipal by-election for councillor #6 in Abercorn, councillors #1 and #4 in Macamic, councillor #3 in Saint-Alphonse, for mayor and councillor #5, Sainte-Anne-de-la-Pocatière, for councillors #1 and #5, Sainte-Anne-du-Lac, for councillors #2, #3, and #4, Sainte-Paul, for councillor #6 in Saint-Justin, for mayor and for councillors #1 and #4, Saint-Louis-de-Blandford, for councillor #1, Saint-Louis-de-Gonzague, for councillor #4, Saint-Michel-de-Bellechasse, for councillor #1, Saint-Prosper-de-Champlain, for councillor #6, Saint-Télesphore, for councillor #4 in Saint-Thuribe, for councillor #5 in Weedon, and for councillor #5 in Wotton, Quebec
  - Western Quebec School Board by-election in Ward #6
- October 23:
  - Nunavut municipal elections
  - Municipal by-elections in Ward 2 & 6, Beaurivage; Ward 2, Campobello Island; mayor, Fredericton Junction; Ward 4, Grand Lake; at-large (2), Grand Manan; Ward 4, Hanwell; at-large, Neguac; at-large, Riverview; Ward 2, Southern Victoria; Ward 1, Sunbury-York South; at-large, Tacy; and Ward 1, Upper Miramichi, New Brunswick
  - Municipal by-election in Beaumont, Alberta
- October 25:
  - Mayoral by-election in Balgonie, Saskatchewan
  - Brandon School Division board trustee election
- October 29: Municipal by-election for councillor #2 in Bryson, mayor and councillor #3 in Maricourt, mayor and councillor #6 in Marieville, councillor #6 in Marsoui, councillor #4 in Nédélec, councillor #4 in Notre-Dame-Auxiliatrice-de-Buckland, mayor and councillors #1, #3 and #4 in Padoue, and councillor #2 in Saint-Joseph-des-Érables, Quebec
- October 30: Municipal by-elections in Breadalbane and Victoria, Prince Edward Island

== November ==
- November 4: Nechako Lakes School District by-election
- November 5: Municipal by-election for councillor #5 in Aguanish, councillor #5 in Dosquet, mayor and councillor #2 in East Farnham, councillor #3 in Hope Town, councillors #2, #4 and #6 in Lac-des-Plages, Les Boisés District, Léry, councillors #1 and #2, Saint-Donat, councillor #4, Sainte-Jeanne-d'Arc (parish), for mayor of Sainte-Thècle, for councillor #5, Saint-Eugène-d'Argentenay, councillors #2 and #6, Saint-François-Xavier-de-Viger, councillor #3, Sainte-Hedwidge, for mayor and councillor #6, Saint-Jean-de-Cherbourg, for councillor #6, Saint-Michel-des-Saints, for councillors #3 and #4, Saint-Omer, for councillor #5, Saint-Paul-de-l'Île-aux-Noix, and for councillors #1 and #2, Shannon, Quebec
- November 6: Municipal by-election in Murray Harbour, Prince Edward Island
- November 8: Grande Yellowhead Public School Division by-election for Ward 2, Grande Cache
- November 12: Municipal by-election in des Arpents-Verts District, L'Ange-Gardien, councillor #4 in Massueville, councillors #3 and #6, Rémigny, councillor #2, Saint-Dominique-du-Rosaire, councillors #2, and #3, Sainte-Rose-de-Watford, for mayor and councillors for Marie-Immaculée and Mgr-Blanche Districts, Sept-Îles, and District 5, Verchères, Quebec
- November 13:
  - Municipal by-election in Ward 1, Cambridge, Ontario
  - Mayoral and municipal by-election in Brackley, Prince Edward Island
- November 14: 2023 Northwest Territories general election
- November 16: Mayoral and council by-election in Hinton, Alberta
- November 18: Municipal by-election in Logan Lake and Greenwood, British Columbia
- November 19: Municipal by-election for mayor and Centre District, Desbiens, councillor #6, Normandin and mayor of Sainte-Lucie-des-Laurentides, Quebec
- November 25: Municipal by-election in Hope, British Columbia
- November 26:
  - Municipal by-election for councillor #3, Portage-du-Fort, for councillor #2, Saint-Bernard, and for Boisés District, Saint-Amable, Quebec
  - 2023 Québec solidaire female co-spokesperson election
- November 27: Municipal by-election in Mount Stewart, Prince Edward Island
- November 30:
  - Kitchener Centre, Ontario provincial by-election
  - Municipal by-election for Ward 20 Scarborough Southwest, Toronto, Ontario.

== December ==
- December 2: 2023 Ontario Liberal Party leadership election
- December 3: Municipal by-election for councillor #4, Saint-Charles-de-Bellechasse, Quebec
- December 4: Mayoral and municipal by-election in Murray River, Prince Edward Island
- December 6: Municipal by-election in Balgonie, Saskatchewan
- December 9: Sunshine Coast School District Area 1 By-election
- December 10: Municipal by-election for councillors #2 and #5, Lamarche, councillor #5, Saint-Gervais, La Chasse District, Baie-Comeau, District 5, Témiscouata-sur-le-Lac, Quebec
- December 11:
  - Municipal elections in the Northwest Territories (hamlets)
  - Municipal by-election in the Clyde River, Prince Edward Island (acclaimed)
- December 17: Mayoral by-election in L'Île-Bizard–Sainte-Geneviève borough, Montreal; Municipal by-election in L'Île-du-Havre-Aubert District, Les Îles-de-la-Madeleine, (not held due to acclamation); Municipal by-election in Elzéar-Deguire District, Coteau-du-Lac, Quebec
- December 18: Municipal by-election in Miscouche, Prince Edward Island
