= Blanche River (Etchemin River tributary) =

River of

Blanche River Old name: Rivière Etchemin Nord-Est
- Location within Quebec
- Native name: Rivière Blanche (French)

Location
- Country: Canada
- Province: Quebec
- Administrative region: Chaudière-Appalaches
- MRC: Les Etchemins Regional County Municipality

Physical characteristics
- Source
  - location: Saint-Philémon
  - coordinates: 46.586834°N 70.452658°W
  - elevation: 727 metres (2,385 ft)
- Mouth: Etchemin River
  - location: Saint-Luc-de-Bellechasse
  - coordinates: 46.51111°N 70.41417°W
  - elevation: 432 metres (1,417 ft)
- Length: 10.5 kilometres (6.5 mi)

Basin features
- Progression: Etchemin River, St. Lawrence River

The Blanche River (French: rivière Blanche, pronounced [ʁivjɛʁ blɑ̃ʃ], lit. 'White River') flows in the administrative region of Chaudière-Appalaches, in the province of Quebec, in Canada, in the regional county municipality of:

- MRC Bellechasse Regional County Municipality: municipalité of Saint-Philémon;
- MRC Les Etchemins Regional County Municipality: municipalities of Saint-Magloire and Saint-Luc-de-Bellechasse.

The Blanche River is a tributary of the north shore of Etchemin River which flows toward north and empties on the shore into the St. Lawrence River, in front of Quebec.

== Geography ==
The main neighboring watersheds of the Blanche river are:

- north side: Beaudoin stream, Milieu stream, rivière du Pin, Gabriel River;
- east side: Etchemin River;
- south side: Etchemin River;
- west side: Dix stream, Bœuf River.

The Blanche river has its source in the Massif du Sud, in the Notre Dame Mountains, in the municipality of Saint-Luc-de-Bellechasse. This spring is located 10.4 kilometres (6.5 mi) south of the center of the village of Saint-Philémon and 3.1 kilometres (1.9 mi) south-east of the summit of mont du Midi.

From its source, the Blanche river flows in a forest zone over 10.5 kilometres (6.5 mi) distributed according to the following segments:

- 1.4 kilometres (0.87 mi) towards the south in Saint-Philémon, to the municipal limit of Saint-Magloire;
- 0.6 kilometres (0.37 mi) towards the south, in Saint-Magloire;
- 3.2 kilometres (2.0 mi) south, to the 12e-Rang road;
- 3.8 kilometres (2.4 mi) towards the south-east, up to the tenth Rang;
- 1.5 kilometres (0.93 mi) south-east, then south-west, to its confluence.

The Blanche river flows onto the north bank of the Etchemin River which here constitutes the municipal limit between Saint-Luc-de-Bellechasse and Sainte-Sabine. The confluence of the Blanche river is located upstream of the confluence of the Bourget river and 4.8 kilometres (3.0 mi) east of the center of the village of Saint-Luc-de-Bellechasse.

== Toponymy ==
The toponym Rivière Blanche was formalized on 18 July 1973 at the Commission de toponymie du Québec. Before 1973, its official name was Rivière Etchemin Nord-Est although its current name was visible on some maps long before its officialization.

== See also ==
- Massif-du-Sud Regional Park, a ski mountain
- List of rivers of Quebec
