= Massif-du-Sud Regional Park =

Protected area in Chaudière-Appalaches, Quebec, Canada

Parc du Massif du Sud
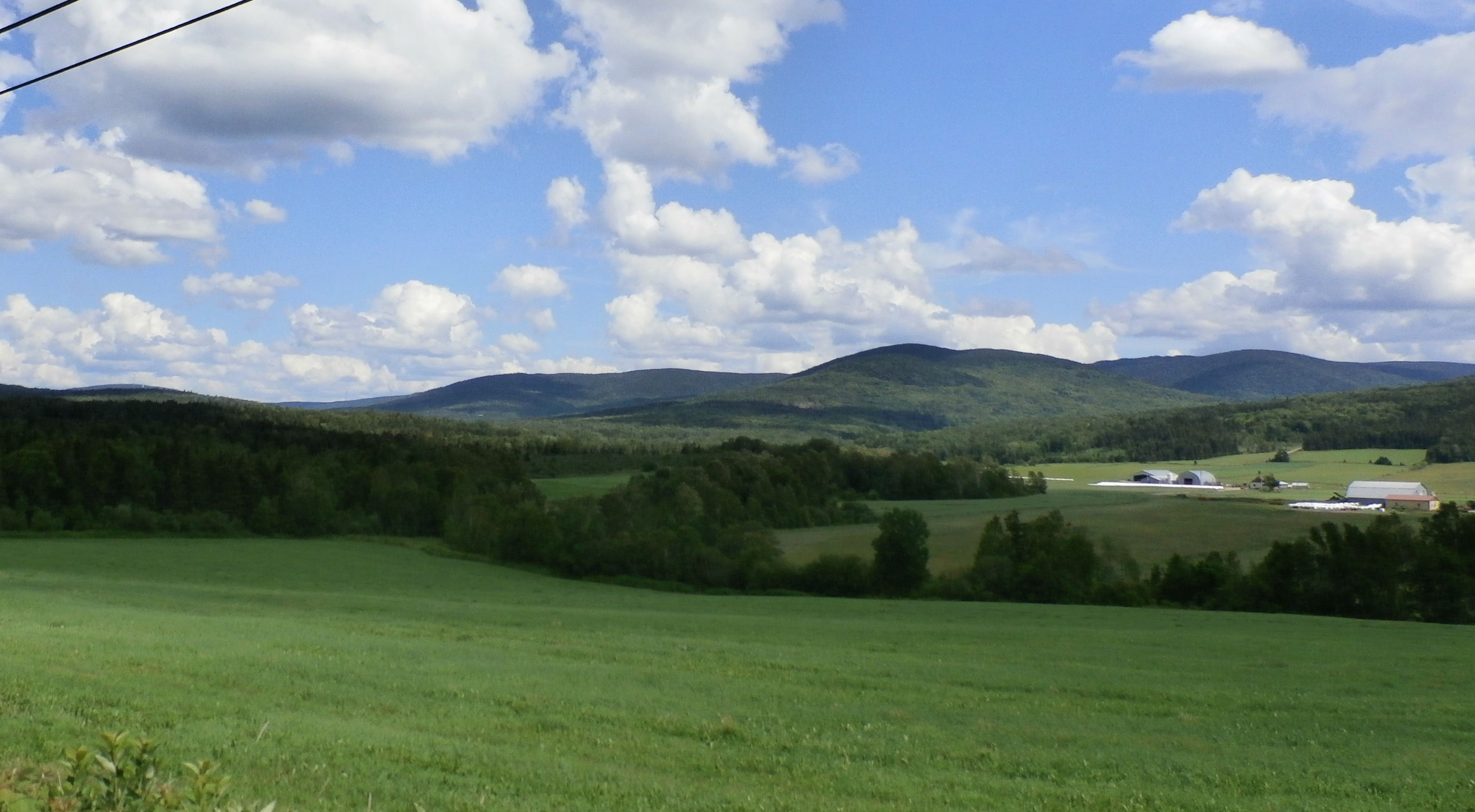
- Partial view of the west side of the Parc du Massif du Sud

- Location within Quebec
- Location: Canada, Quebec, Centre-du-Québec, Bellechasse Regional County Municipality and Les Etchemins Regional County Municipality
- Coordinates: 46.5904732°N 70.4436782°W
- Area: 120 km^{2} (46 sq mi)
- Created: 1989
- Visitors: 10,000
- Administrator: Parc du Massif du Sud
- Website: Parc du Massif-du-Sud

Parc du Massif du Sud is a regional park located in the heart of Massif du Sud, in Bellechasse Regional County Municipality and Les Etchemins Regional County Municipality, in Chaudière-Appalaches, in Quebec, in Canada.

This regional park extends over parts of the MRC of:

- Les Etchemins Regional County Municipality: municipalities of Saint-Luc-de-Bellechasse and Saint-Magloire;
- Bellechasse Regional County Municipality: municipalities of the parishes of Saint-Philémon and Notre-Dame-Auxiliatrice-de-Buckland.

This place name refers to the Massif du Sud, an important element of the Notre Dame Mountains of the mountain range called Appalachian Mountains. This park is a place of attraction for downhill skiing and outdoor enthusiasts.

== Geography ==
This massif is an important orographic element of the Appalachian Mountains chain, there are 3 summits: Mont du Midi, Mont Chocolat and Mont Saint-Magloire.

== Hydrology ==
The hydrographic slope of the northern half of the park flows into the Rivière du Sud which flows north to the St. Lawrence River where it flows near the village of Montmagny. While the slope of the other half flows mainly into the Blanche River, which flow into Etchemin River. The latest flows up to the St. Lawrence River, in the Saint-Romuald.

== Main activities ==
This regional park has a large capacity of reception in its service offer. The main activities offered are:

- summer: hiking and trail running, mountain biking, fishing, geocoaching, hebertism course, ornithology, special events, southern massif trail, Halloween night walk;
- winter: snowshoeing, cross-country skiing (classic), mountain skiing, ski-snowshoeing (ski hok), fat bike (oversized tire bike), special activities.

In addition, the park offers nature interpretation and training activities: guided hikes, mushroom picking, mycogastronomy, medicinal plants, edible plants, survival in the forest, maps, compasses and GPS, Perseid evening.

== Accommodation ==
Park users can accommodate there in various ways:

- campsite: 66 rustic campsites in the heart of nature;
- recreational vehicles: in the Érables and in the Bouleaux camping area in the heart of the park;
- pods (ready-to-camp): 5 locations in the Desjardins sector;
- shelters: 3 shelters, namely the Méandres refuge, the Cascades refuge and the Milieu refuge;
- shelters ready to camp: footbridge refuge for family stays;
- shared shelters: located at the base camp located 7 km from a parking lot; it serves as a relay for hikers and skiers during the day;
- boreal tents (ready-to-camp): two boreal tents for four-season accommodation;
- yurts (ready-to-camp): equipped with a fireplace;
- prospector tents: equipped with a fireplace for eight people;
- winter camping: in the Trois-Fourches camping sector, about 400 m from the reception station and Versant sector.
