= Rivière des Mornes =

River in Chaudière-Appalaches, Quebec (Canada)

- Location within Quebec

Location
- Country: Canada
- Province: Quebec
- Region: Chaudière-Appalaches
- MRC: Bellechasse Regional County Municipality

Physical characteristics
- Source: Mountain stream
  - location: Saint-Luc-de-Bellechasse
  - coordinates: 46.586028°N 70.491369°W
  - elevation: 816 metres (2,677 ft)
- Mouth: Rivière de la Fourche
  - location: Saint-Philémon
  - coordinates: 46.62833°N 70.46861°W
  - elevation: 437 metres (1,434 ft)
- Length: 10.6 kilometres (6.6 mi)

Basin features
- Progression: Rivière de la Fourche, rivière du Sud (Montmagny), St. Lawrence River
- Tributaries
  - left: (upstream)
  - right: (upstream)

The rivière des Mornes (in English: Mornes river) crosses the municipality of Saint-Luc-de-Bellechasse (MRC Les Etchemins Regional County Municipality), as well as Notre-Dame-Auxiliatrice-de-Buckland and Saint-Philémon, in the Bellechasse Regional County Municipality, in the administrative region of Chaudière-Appalaches, in Québec, in Canada.

The Rivière des Mornes is a tributary of the west bank of the rivière de la Fourche, which flows northward to empty onto the south bank of the rivière du Sud (Montmagny); the latter flows northwest, then northeast to the south shore of the St. Lawrence River.

== Geography ==
The main neighboring watersheds of the Des Mornes river are:

- North side: rivière de la Fourche, rivière des Originaux, rivière du Sud (Montmagny);
- East side: rivière de la Fourche, brook du Milieu, brook Beaudoin;
- South side: Milieu stream, Belles Amours stream, rivière à Bœuf, Blanche River;
- West side: rivière des Fleurs, Etchemin River.

The Mornes river has its source in the township of Standon, in the municipality of Saint-Luc-de-Bellechasse, in the Les Etchemins Regional County Municipality. This source is located 2.7 kilometres (1.7 mi) south of the summit of the "Montagne du Midi" of the "Massif du Sud". These mountains are part of the Notre Dame Mountains chain.

From its source, the Mornes river flows over 10.6 kilometres (6.6 mi), rolling down the mountain in a deep valley, divided into the following segments:

- 2.9 kilometres (1.8 mi) towards the north-west in Saint-Luc-de-Bellechasse, up to the limit of Notre-Dame-Auxiliatrice-de-Buckland;
- 4.6 kilometres (2.9 mi) towards the northeast, in the township of Buckland, in the municipality of Notre-Dame-Auxiliatrice-de-Buckland, to the limit Saint-Philémon;
- 3.1 kilometres (1.9 mi) towards the northeast in Saint-Philémon, until its confluence.

The confluence of the Mornes river is located at a place called "Les Trois-Fourches" and constitutes the head of the rivière de la Fourche. This confluence is located 3.1 kilometres (1.9 mi) northeast of the summit of the Montagne du Midi, 3.8 kilometres (2.4 mi) southeast of the hamlet of Buckland East and 4.6 kilometres (2.9 mi) north-west of the summit of Mont Saint-Magloire.

== Toponymy ==
The name “Rivière des Mornes” is associated with the mountainous terrain of the area.

The toponym “rivière des Mornes” was made official on February 18, 1977, at the Commission de toponymie du Québec.

== See also ==
- List of rivers of Quebec
