= Rivière de la Fourche =

River in Chaudière-Appalaches, Quebec (Canada)

- Location within Quebec

Location
- Country: Canada
- Province: Quebec
- Region: Chaudière-Appalaches
- MRC: Bellechasse Regional County Municipality

Physical characteristics
- Source: Confluence of the rivière des Mornes, Milieu stream and Beaudoin stream
  - location: Saint-Philémon
  - coordinates: 46.629861°N 70.46654°W
  - elevation: 437 metres (1,434 ft)
- Mouth: Rivière du Sud (Montmagny)
  - location: Armagh
  - coordinates: 46.73111°N 70.55778°W
  - elevation: 256 metres (840 ft)
- Length: 29.1 kilometres (18.1 mi)

Basin features
- Progression: Rivière du Sud (Montmagny), St. Lawrence River
- Tributaries
  - left: (upstream) ruisseau Chabot, ruisseau Théberge, ruisseau du Sud, rivière des Orignaux.
  - right: (upstream) cours d'eau Goulet, cours d'eau du rang Taché Ouest, ruisseau de la Grillade.

The rivière de la Fourche (in English: river of the Fork) crosses the municipality of Saint-Philémon (MRC Les Etchemins Regional County Municipality), as well as Notre-Dame-Auxiliatrice-de-Buckland and Armagh, in the Bellechasse Regional County Municipality, in the administrative region of Chaudière-Appalaches, in Quebec, in Canada .

The Fourche River is a tributary of the south shore of the rivière du Sud (Montmagny) which flows north-west, then north-east to the south shore of the St. Lawrence River.

== Toponymy ==
The Fourche river takes its name from the fact that the three head waterways (rivière des Orignaux, brook of Milieu and brook Beaudoin) converge together, forming a fork on the maps geographical areas, the handle of which points to the north-west.

The toponym “rivière de la Fourche” was made official on September 11, 1987, at the Commission de toponymie du Québec.

== See also ==
- List of rivers of Quebec
