= North River (Gabriel River tributary) =

River in Chaudière-Appalaches, Quebec (Canada)

- Location within Quebec
- Native name: Rivière du Nord (French)

Location
- Country: Canada
- Province: Quebec
- Region: Chaudière-Appalaches
- MRC: Bellechasse Regional County Municipality

Physical characteristics
- Source: Mountain stream
  - location: Saint-Paul-de-Montminy
  - coordinates: 46.718738°N 70.323226°W
  - elevation: 627 metres (2,057 ft)
- Mouth: Gabriel River
  - location: Saint-Philémon
  - coordinates: 46.69667°N 70.41917°W
  - elevation: 365 metres (1,198 ft)
- Length: 10.3 kilometres (6.4 mi)

Basin features
- Progression: Gabriel River, Rivière du Pin (rivière du Sud tributary), Rivière du Sud (Montmagny), St. Lawrence River
- Tributaries
  - left: (upstream)
  - right: (upstream) Ruisseau Tanguay

The Rivière du Nord is a tributary of the north bank of the Gabriel River, which flows west to empty onto the east bank of the rivière du Pin which has its tower flows north to the south bank of the rivière du Sud (Montmagny); the latter flows first west, then north-east to the south shore of the St. Lawrence River, in the administrative region of Chaudière-Appalaches, in Quebec, in Canada.

The Rivière du Nord crosses the regional county municipalities (MRC) of:

- Montmagny Regional County Municipality: municipality of Saint-Paul-de-Montminy;
- Bellechasse Regional County Municipality: municipality of Saint-Philémon.

== Geography ==
The Rivière du Nord has its source in a mountainous area in the sixth rang in the municipality of Saint-Paul-de-Montminy in the Notre Dame Mountains. This source is located northwest of Lake Gosselin.

From its source, the North River "flows in a valley steeped in 10.3 kilometres (6.4 mi) according to the following segments:

- 2.3 kilometres (1.4 mi) west, up to the fifth rang road;
- 2.8 kilometres (1.7 mi) west, to route 216 which it crosses on the west side of the village of Saint-Paul-de-Montminy;
- 1.0 kilometre (0.62 mi) southwesterly, along route 216 on the north side, to the confluence of Tanguay stream;
- 1.5 kilometres (0.93 mi) westward, up to the limit between Saint-Paul-de-Montminy and Saint-Philémon;
- 2.7 kilometres (1.7 mi) towards the west, crossing the Gabriel road, until its confluence.

The North River "flows on the north bank of the Gabriel River. This confluence is located on the south side of route 216 and at 1.4 kilometres (0.87 mi) upstream of the confluence of the Gabriel River.

== Toponymy ==
The toponym Rivière du Nord was formalized on February 8, 1977, at the Commission de toponymie du Québec.

== See also ==
- List of rivers of Quebec
