= Mont du Midi =

Mountain of Chaudière-Appalaches, in Quebec, Canada

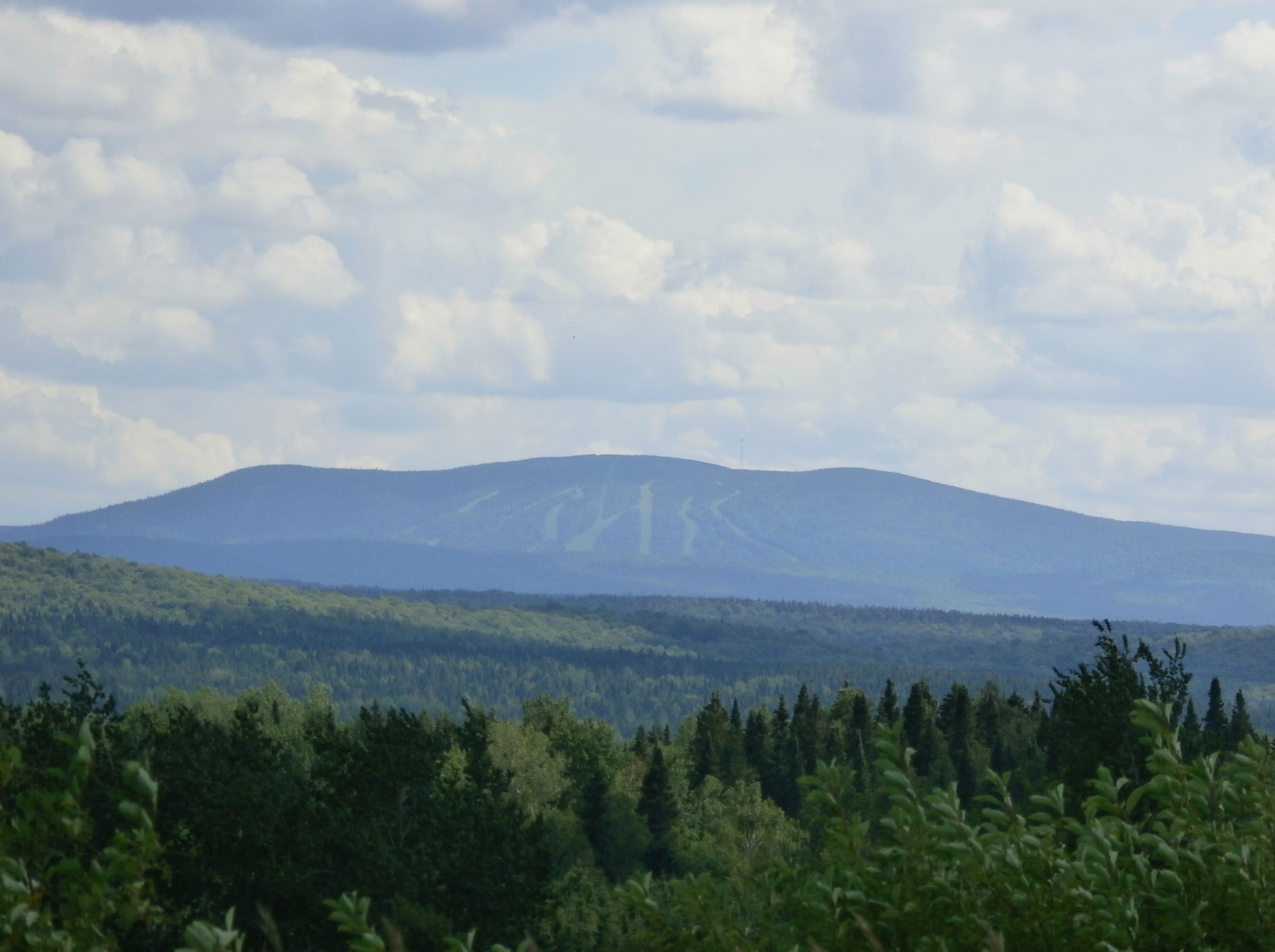
- Mont du Midi in the Notre-Dame mountains.

Highest point
- Elevation: 915 m (3,002 ft)
- Coordinates: 46.60333°N 70.49389°W

Geography
- Country: Canada
- Province: Quebec
- Administrative region: Chaudière-Appalaches
- Regional County Municipality: Les Etchemins Regional County Municipality
- Parent range: Massif du Sud (Notre Dame Mountains, Appalachian Mountains)

The mont du Midi (in English: Midi Mount) is a mountain in the Les Etchemins Regional County Municipality, near Saint-Luc-de-Bellechasse, in region of Chaudière-Appalaches, in Quebec, in Canada.

It is part of the Massif-du-Sud Regional Park.

== Geography ==
Located south of the St. Lawrence River, the Mont du Midi has an altitude of 915 metres (3,002 ft) and is the highest point of the Massif du Sud. This mountain peak is located about twenty kilometers north of the municipality of Lac-Etchemin and 2 km west of the Claude-Mélançon Ecological Reserve. This summit is the highest peak between Mont Mégantic and the Chic-Choc Mountains. This mountain peak is located about twenty kilometers north of the municipality of Lac-Etchemin and 2 km west of the Claude-Mélançon Ecological Reserve. It is part of the Parc régional du Massif-du-Sud

== See also ==
- List of mountains of Quebec
