= Rivière du Pin =

River in Chaudière-Appalaches, Quebec, Canada

- Location within Quebec

Location
- Country: Canada
- Province: Quebec
- Region: Chaudière-Appalaches
- MRC: Les Etchemins Regional County Municipality, Bellechasse Regional County Municipality, Montmagny Regional County Municipality

Physical characteristics
- Source: Mountain stream
  - location: Saint-Magloire
  - coordinates: 46.599331°N 70.404818°W
  - elevation: 764 metres (2,507 ft)
- Mouth: Rivière du Sud (Montmagny)
  - location: Armagh
  - coordinates: 46.64333°N 70.54528°W
  - elevation: 287 metres (942 ft)
- Length: 30.6 kilometres (19.0 mi)

Basin features
- Progression: Rivière du Sud (Montmagny), St. Lawrence River
- Tributaries
  - left: (upstream)
  - right: (upstream) Gabriel River, ruisseau de la Grande Ligne

The rivière du Pin is a tributary of the south bank of the rivière du Sud (Montmagny) which flows north-east to the south bank of the St. Lawrence, in the administrative region of Chaudière-Appalaches, in Quebec, in Canada.

The Rivière du Pin crosses the regional county municipalities (RCM) of:

- Les Etchemins Regional County Municipality: municipality of Saint-Magloire;
- Bellechasse Regional County Municipality: municipalities of Saint-Philémon, Armagh;
- Montmagny Regional County Municipality: municipality of Sainte-Euphémie-sur-Rivière-du-Sud.

== Geography ==
The Pin river has its source in a mountainous area in the municipality of Saint-Magloire in the Notre Dame Mountains.

From its source, the Pin river "flows in a valley encircled on 30.6 kilometres (19.0 mi) according to the following segments:

- 0.8 kilometres (0.50 mi) towards the northeast, up to the limit between Saint-Magloire and Saint-Philémon;
- 3.4 kilometres (2.1 mi) towards the north, collecting water from mountain streams, up to the falls "Les Portes de l'Enfer";
- 2.7 kilometres (1.7 mi) northeasterly, to route 281;
- 7.0 kilometres (4.3 mi) north-west, to the bridge on Chemin du Rang Saint-Isidore;
- 5.0 kilometres (3.1 mi) towards the north, collecting water from its main tributary the Gabriel River, to route 216 which it intersects at 2.6 kilometres (1.6 mi) east of the center of the village of Saint-Philémon;
- 5.9 kilometres (3.7 mi) north-west, up to the north-west limit of Saint-Philémon;
- 3.2 kilometres (2.0 mi) towards the north-west, forming the limit between Armagh and Sainte-Euphémie-sur-Rivière-du-Sud;
- 1.2 kilometres (0.75 mi) north, in Armagh, to the Fourche-du-Pin road bridge;
- 1.4 kilometres (0.87 mi) north-west, up to its confluence.

The Pin river flows on the south shore of the rivière du Sud (Montmagny) at the limit of the municipalities of Armagh and Sainte-Euphémie-sur-Rivière-du-Sud.

== Toponymy ==
The toponym Rivière du Pin was formalized on December 5, 1968, at the Commission de toponymie du Québec.

== See also ==
- List of rivers of Quebec
