= Mont Saint-Magloire =

Mountain of Chaudière-Appalaches, in Quebec, Canada

Highest point
- Elevation: 917 metres (3,009 ft)
- Coordinates: 46.60667°N 70.41778°W

Geography
- Location: Massif-du-Sud Regional Park
- Country: Canada
- Province: Quebec
- Administrative region: Chaudière-Appalaches
- Regional County Municipality: Bellechasse Regional County Municipality
- Parent range: Massif du Sud (Notre Dame Mountains, Appalachian Mountains)

Mont Saint-Magloire (in English: Saint-Magloire Mount) is a mountain in the municipality of Saint-Philémon, Bellechasse Regional County Municipality, in region of Chaudière-Appalaches, in Quebec, in Canada.

It is part of the Massif-du-Sud Regional Park.

== Geography ==
Located south of the St. Lawrence River in the Notre Dame Mountains, the Mont Saint-Magloire has an altitude of 917 metres (3,009 ft). This mountain peak is located about sixty kilometers south of the Lévis. and is part of the Massif du Sud. The summit is included in the Massif-du-Sud Regional Park.

The flora of Mont Saint-Magloire is mainly composed of paper birch, red pine, sugar maple, balsam fir, yellow birch, white spruce, tamarack and western cedar (white cedar). The fauna, meanwhile, is made up of white-tailed deer, river otters, beavers, originals and black bear.

== View and access to the mountain ==
Once on Mont Saint-Magloire, it is possible to have a view of the surrounding mountains and of the EDF wind farm. To access the mountain, you must go through wooded hiking trails. It is only possible in winter to access the mountain by snowmobile via these trails.

== Rare forest of Mont Saint-Magloire ==
The climate of the high Appalachian mountains is similar to that encountered a few hundred kilometers further north. The boreal forest is found in these two areas. Naturally, the boreal forest is made up of a variety of stands of different ages. By keeping watch, various natural disturbances destroy the old trees in these conifer stands: windfall, fire or an epidemic of budworm. In addition, human activities cause major disturbances, especially logging. Animal species that prefer regenerating stands are sometimes at an advantage. Nevertheless, some species are endangered because they need to meet their basic needs in old coniferous forests.

In the Mont Saint-Magloire area, the boreal forest is rather restricted to the upper part of the high mountains. Thus, several animal species live in the alpine forests of the Massif du Sud as in the Nordic forest. The Claude-Mélançon Ecological Reserve in the heart of the Massif du Sud has an area of 535. The territory administered by this reserve includes the western slope of Mont Saint-Magloire. The highest point of this park reaches 917 metres (3,009 ft) above sea level. Forest cuts being prohibited there, the forest fabric contains a part of old coniferous stands characterized by many old trees, snags and dead trees lying on the ground. This abundance of dead trees favors certain wildlife species that feed, shelter and protect themselves from predators.

Some ornithologists have identified certain species of birds, very uncommon south of the St. Lawrence, which survive in this old resinous forest, a rarefied habitat if there are logging. These species are: spruce grouse, black-backed woodpecker, tawny sparrow, white-crowned sparrow, yellow-bellied flycatcher, golden-crowned wren, evening grosbeak, red crossbill, crooked crossbill, collared warbler. and striped warbler.

The black-backed woodpecker captures insects by drilling holes in the trunks of senescent or dead conifers. The collared warbler builds its nests with tree lichen which grows on old coniferous trees. In addition, the crossbill feeds almost exclusively on seeds of conifers, which are found abundant on large trees.

== Recreational activities ==
A 15.0 kilometres (9.3 mi) trail (round trip) in forest allows the visitors to reach the summit. The height difference is 527 metres (1,729 ft). This path, which turns out to be little used, runs along a river. Its difficulty is considered moderate. The trail offers several activities.

== Toponym ==
This name is link to the municipality of Saint-Magloire, on whose territory it is partly located. The name of this municipality recalls the memory of Father Joseph-Magloire Rioux (1831-1908), the first serving places.

This toponym was formalized on March 6, 1970 at the Place name bank of the Commission de toponymie du Québec.

== See also ==
- List of mountains of Quebec
