= Rivière des Orignaux =

River in Chaudière-Appalaches, Quebec (Canada)

Rivière des Orignaux Old name:"Ruisseau des Pointes"
- Location within Quebec

Location
- Country: Canada
- Province: Quebec
- Region: Chaudière-Appalaches
- MRC: Bellechasse Regional County Municipality

Physical characteristics
- Source: Mountain stream
  - location: Notre-Dame-Auxiliatrice-de-Buckland
  - coordinates: 46.601903°N 70.593336°W
  - elevation: 399 metres (1,309 ft)
- Mouth: Rivière de la Fourche
  - location: Notre-Dame-Auxiliatrice-de-Buckland
  - coordinates: 46.64333°N 70.54528°W
  - elevation: 336 metres (1,102 ft)
- Length: 9.2 kilometres (5.7 mi)

Basin features
- Progression: Rivière de la Fourche, rivière du Sud (Montmagny), St. Lawrence River
- Tributaries
  - left: (upstream)
  - right: (upstream)

The rivière des Orignaux (in English: Mooses River) crosses the municipality of Notre-Dame-Auxiliatrice-de-Buckland, in the Bellechasse Regional County Municipality, in the administrative region of Chaudière-Appalaches, in Quebec, in Canada.

Rivière des Orignaux is a tributary of the southwest bank of the rivière de la Fourche, which flows northward to empty onto the south bank of the rivière du Sud (Montmagny); the latter flows northwest, then northeast to the south shore of the St. Lawrence River.

== Geography ==
The main neighboring watersheds of the Des Orignaux river are:

- North side: rivière de la Fourche, South stream, rivière du Sud (Montmagny);
- East side: rivière de la Fourche;
- South side: rivière des Mornes, Belles Amours stream;
- West side: rivière du Moulin, rivière aux Billots.

The Rivière des Orignaux has its source in the township of Buckland, in the municipality of Notre-Dame-Auxiliatrice-de-Buckland, in the Bellechasse Regional County Municipality. The surrounding mountains are part of the Notre Dame Mountains chain.

From its source, the Rivière des Orignaux flows on 9.1 kilometres (5.7 mi) at the bottom of a valley, divided into the following segments:

- 3.9 kilometres (2.4 mi) northeasterly in Notre-Dame-Auxiliatrice-de-Buckland, to chemin du rang Saint-Roch (route 279);
- 3.0 kilometres (1.9 mi) northeasterly, to rang Ville-Marie road;
- 2.2 kilometres (1.4 mi) towards the northeast, up to its confluence.

The confluence of the Rivière des Orignaux is located on the southwest bank of the Forks River, in the township of Buckland. This confluence is located at 2.9 kilometres (1.8 mi) north of Buckland, 10.6 kilometres (6.6 mi) south of rivière du Sud (Montmagny) and at 1.9 kilometres (1.2 mi) northwest of route 216.

== Toponymy ==
The toponym “rivière des Orignaux” was made official on September 11, 1987, at the Commission de toponymie du Québec.

== See also ==
- List of rivers of Quebec
