= Mount Chocolat =

Mount in Chaudière-Appalaches, in Quebec, Canada

Highest point
- Elevation: 717 m (2,352 ft)
- Coordinates: 46.5886°N 70.4732°W

Geography
- Country: Canada
- Province: Quebec
- Administrative region: Chaudière-Appalaches
- MRC: Bellechasse Regional County Municipality
- Parent range: Massif du Sud (Notre Dame Mountains, Appalachian Mountains)

Mount Chocolat is a mountain located in Saint-Philémon, in the Bellechasse Regional County Municipality, in the administrative region of Chaudière-Appalaches, in Quebec, Canada.

The "Domaine du Cerf du Massif du Sud" has around fifty houses built on the mountainside.

== Geography ==
Located in the Notre Dame Mountains south of the St. Lawrence River, Mont Chocolat has an altitude of 717 metres (2,352 ft) and is part of the Massif du Sud. It is also part of the northwest sector of the Massif-du-Sud Regional Park.

== Activities ==
According to the trail map, Mont Chocolat offers a loop hiking trail of 3.7 kilometres (2.3 mi) with a drop of 267 metres (876 ft) for a duration of about two hours for an expert hiker or 3h30 (including dinner) for an intermediate type hiker.

The ascent of the mountain offers a particular panorama of the valley; a belvedere is arranged at the top. A segment of the trail runs along the river and crosses the area of a maple grove. Hikers can see magnificent panoramas, particularly in the section of the palisade trail which runs along rock faces about 50 m high.

The trail of 10 km (minimum altitude of 474 m and maximum of 666 m) and 21 km (minimum altitude of 474 m and maximum of 917 m) of the Trail du Massif du Sud passes through Mont Chocolat. On the occasion of the night excursions are organized in groups in the company of a guide.

== Place names ==
The name of this mountain originates from its shape resembling chocolates filled with cherries. The toponym "Chocolate" was made official on March 16, 2004 at the Place Names Bank of the Commission de toponymie du Québec.

== See also ==
- Massif-du-Sud Regional Park
- Massif du Sud
- List of mountains of Quebec
