= Claude-Mélançon Ecological Reserve =

- IUCN category Ia (strict nature reserve)
- Interactive map of Claude-Mélançon Ecological Reserve
- Location: Saint-Philémon / Saint-Magloire, Bellechasse Regional County Municipality, Québec, Canada
- Nearest city: Lévis
- Coordinates: 46.6069°N 70.4389°W
- Area: 53,459 hectares (132,100 acres)
- Max. elevation: 950 metres (3,120 ft)
- Established: February 17, 1988

The Claude-Mélançon Ecological Reserve (in French: Réserve écologique CLaude-Mélançon) is an ecological reserve located in the municipality of Saint-Philémon, in Bellechasse Regional County Municipality (MRC), in administrative region of Chaudière-Appalaches, in Quebec, Canada.

The reserve protects a representative ecosystem of the Hautes-Appalaches and the hills of Mégantic, Etchemin Lake and Saint-Michel-du-Squatec. This reserve was established on February 17, 1988 for recreotouristic activities.

== Geography ==
This reserve is located at about 60 km at the South-East of Quebec, between Mont Saint-Magloire (the highest point of the massif) and the ruisseau du Milieu. The territory of the reserve is part of a complex of mountains, which are rounded in shape and their altitude varies between 450 metres (1,480 ft) and some 950 metres (3,120 ft). The bedrock is composed of schists on which tills rest, the thickness of which varies according to the topographical position.

== Vegetation ==
Under the effect of the local climate, the vegetation gradually varies in stages as it increases in altitude: first the sugar maple-yellow birch grove, the yellow birch-birch grove with fir, the balsam fir grove with white birch and finally the balsam fir stand. mountains.

== Fauna ==
Ornithologists have identified 25 species of nesting birds in particular. Wildlife is found to be varied in the area, including moose, white-tailed deer, beaver, hare, fisher, bobcat, fox, coyote, black bear, American marten, ermine, river otter, American mink, squirrel, vole and shrew.

== Toponymy ==
The name of the reserve pays homage to Claude Mélançon (1895–1973), a naturalist who worked in the popularization of science. Mélançon was very prolific as naturalist, lecturer and author (novelist and journalist). He was very active in all circles interested in natural sciences. His main works, several times republished, are entitled: Par terre et par eau (By land and by water), Inconnus et méconnus (sur les amphibiens et reptiles) (Unknown and misunderstood (on amphibians and reptiles)), Nos animaux chez eux (portant sur les mammifères) (Our animals at home (on mammals)); Charmants voisins (portant sur les oiseaux) (Charming Neighbors (covering birds)) and Les poissons de nos eaux (Fishes in our waters).

Claude Mélançon was a member of the Canadian Society of Natural History and the Zoological Society of Quebec. A recreative park in the city of Boucherville has been named in his name in recognition of his life's work. This park is located at the 1130 des Fauvettes street.

The toponyme "Réserve écologique Claude-Mélançon" was formalized on Dec. 13. 1988 in the Bank of place names of the Commission de toponymie du Québec.

== See also ==
- Claude Mélançon
