= Saint-Louis-de-Gonzague, Quebec =

Saint-Louis-de-Gonzague, Quebec may refer to one of three communities:

- Saint-Louis-de-Gonzague, Chaudière-Appalaches, Quebec, a municipality in Les Etchemins Regional County Municipality
- Saint-Louis-de-Gonzague, Montérégie, Quebec, a parish in Beauharnois-Salaberry Regional County Municipality
- Saint-Louis-de-Gonzague-du-Cap-Tourmente, a parish in La Côte-de-Beaupré Regional County Municipality
