= Saint-Cyprien, Quebec =

Saint-Cyprien, Quebec may refer to:

- Saint-Cyprien, Chaudière-Appalaches, Quebec, in Les Etchemins Regional County Municipality
- Saint-Cyprien, Bas-Saint-Laurent, Quebec, in Rivière-du-Loup Regional County Municipality
