= Claude Mélançon =

French Canadian naturalist and author

- Born: 1895; Montreal, Canada
- Died: 1973; Miami, Florida, United States
- Awards: honorary doctorate (UdeM), Pierre-Chauveau Medal, medal of Royal Society of Canada, recipient of Academic Palms, named an Officer of Order of Canada and toponymy Claude-Mélançon Ecological Reserve
- Scientific career
- Fields: Natural sciences
- Notable students: Natural sciences vulgarization

Claude Mélançon (1895–1973) was a Canadian naturalist who worked in the popularization of natural sciences. He is recognized as a Quebec pioneer in the popularization of science. Mélançon was very prolific as a naturalist, lecturer, and author (novelist and journalist). He was very active in many circles interested in natural sciences.

== Career ==
Mélançon was a member of the Canadian Society of Natural History (in French: Société canadienne d'histoire naturelle) and the Zoological Society of Quebec (in French: Société zoologique de Québec).

== Main published works ==
His main works, several times republished, are entitled:

- Par terre et par eau (By land and by water); 25 editions published between 1900 and 1956 in French;
- Inconnus et méconnus (sur les amphibiens et reptiles) (Unknown and misunderstood (on amphibians and reptiles)); 10 editions published between 1950 and 1996 in French;
- Nos animaux chez eux (portant sur les mammifères) (Our animals at home (on mammals)); 29 editions published between 1934 and 1988 in French;
- Charmants voisins (portant sur les oiseaux) (Charming Neighbors (covering birds)); 32 editions published between 1940 and 2006 in 3 languages;
- Les poissons de nos eaux (Fishes in our waters); 30 editions published between 1936 ans 2006 in French.
- Indian Legends of Canada; 25 editions published between 1967 and 1986 in French and English;
- Percé et les oiseaux de l'Ile Bonaventure; 14 editions published between 1963 and 1974;
- Mon alphabet des villes du Canada; 2 editions published in 1944 in French;
- Mon alphabet des villes du Québec; 2 editions published in 1944 in French.

== Toponyms "Claude Mélançon" ==
Created in 1988, the Claude-Mélançon Ecological Reserve have been named in recognition of his great contribution in the public sphere to the popularization of the natural sciences.

In 2005, the city of Montreal adopted the toponymic designation "Parc Claude-Mélançon" in his memory. This relaxation park is located on rue Saint-Christophe in the borough of Ville-Marie.

A recreational park in the city of Boucherville has been named after him.
