= Sainte-Rose-de-Watford =

- Municipality
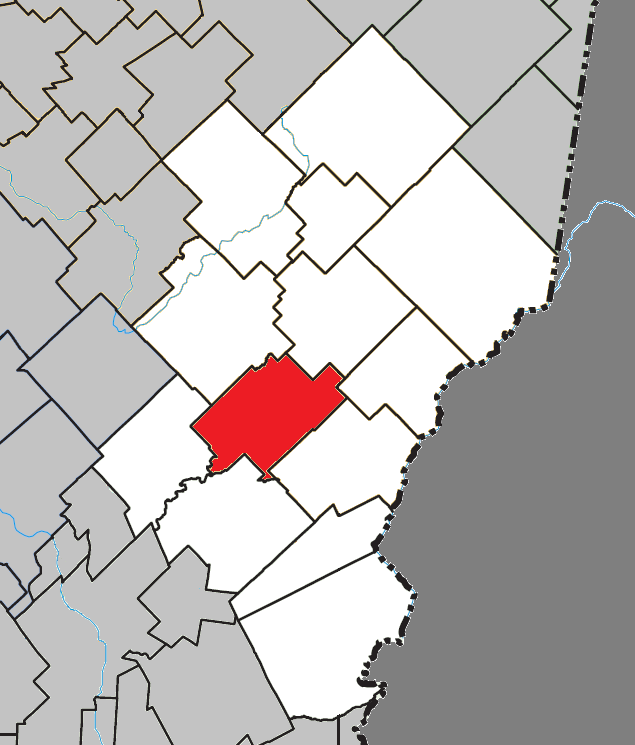
- Location within Les Etchemins RCM.

- Location in southern Quebec.
- Coordinates: 46°19′N 70°25′W
- Country: Canada
- Province: Quebec
- Region: Chaudière-Appalaches
- RCM: Les Etchemins
- Constituted: November 17, 1897

Government
  - Mayor: Pierre Lantagne
  - Federal riding: Bellechasse—Les Etchemins—Lévis
  - Prov. riding: Bellechasse

Area
  - Total: 115.70 km^{2} (44.67 sq mi)
  - Land: 115.50 km^{2} (44.59 sq mi)

Population (2011)
  - Total: 787
  - Density: 6.8/km^{2} (18/sq mi)
  - Pop 2006-2011: ▲4.9%
  - Dwellings: 414
- Time zone: UTC−5 (EST)
  - Summer (DST): UTC−4 (EDT)
- Postal code(s): G0R 4G0
- Area codes: 418 and 581
- Highways: R-204; R-277
- Website: www.sainterose dewatford.qc.ca

Sainte-Rose-de-Watford is a municipality in the Municipalité régionale de comté des Etchemins, in Quebec, Canada. It is part of the Chaudière-Appalaches region and the population is 747 as of 2009. It is named after both Rose of Lima, the first Catholic saint of the Americas, and Watford, a town in Hertfordshire, England.
