= Saint-Louis-de-Gonzague, Chaudière-Appalaches, Quebec =

Saint-Louis-de-Gonzague
- Municipality
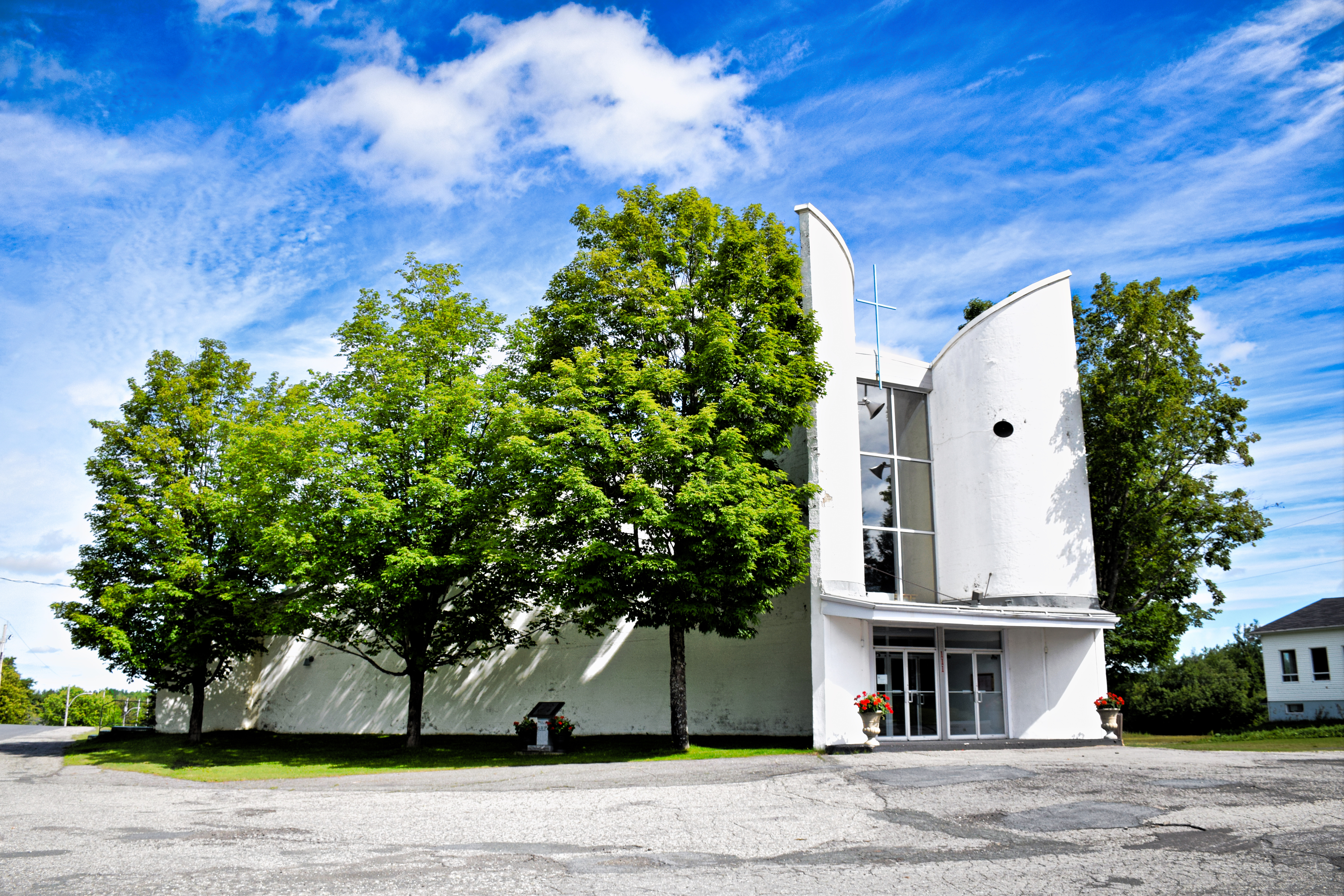
- The church.

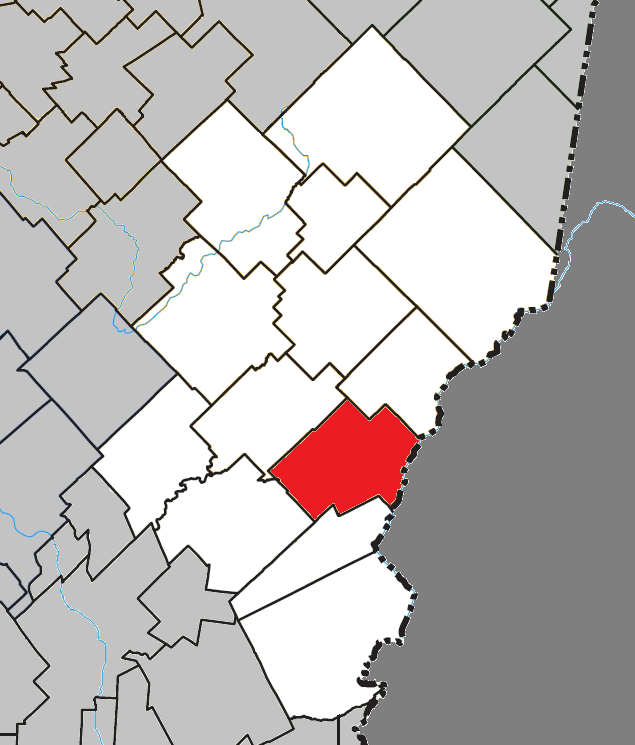
- Location within Les Etchemins RCM.

- Location in southern Quebec.
- Coordinates: 46°16′N 70°20′W
- Country: Canada
- Province: Quebec
- Region: Chaudière-Appalaches
- RCM: Les Etchemins
- Constituted: March 17, 1923

Government
  - Mayor: Suzanne Campeau Guenette
  - Federal riding: Bellechasse—Les Etchemins—Lévis
  - Prov. riding: Bellechasse

Area
  - Total: 118.50 km^{2} (45.75 sq mi)
  - Land: 118.02 km^{2} (45.57 sq mi)

Population (2016)
  - Total: 374
  - Density: 3.2/km^{2} (8.3/sq mi)
  - Pop 2011-2016: ▼11.2%
  - Dwellings: 232
- Time zone: UTC−5 (EST)
  - Summer (DST): UTC−4 (EDT)
- Postal code(s): G0R 2L0
- Area codes: 418 and 581
- Highways: R-277
- Website: www.st-louis degonzague.qc.ca

Saint-Louis-de-Gonzague (French pronunciation: [sɛ̃ lwi də ɡɔ̃zaɡ]) is a municipality in the Les Etchemins Regional County Municipality in the Chaudière-Appalaches region of Quebec, Canada. Its population is 374 as of the Canada 2016 Census. It lies on the Canada–United States border.

== Name ==
The origin of the name of the municipality is subject to debate and three versions are possible. It seems that settlers would have liked to name their parish Saint-Louis, but it was refused due to possible confusion with Saint-Louis-de-Kamouraska (now part of Kamouraska, Quebec). Monsignor Elzéar-Alexandre Taschereau then suggested to name it Saint-Louis-de-Gonzague, following saint Aloysius Gonzaga.

Another version would be that Cardinal Louis-Nazaire Bégin would have wanted to honour his patron saint, Aloysius Gonzaga.

Lastly, it could also have been to honour Louis-Philippe Pelletier, member of the Legislative Assembly of Quebec for Dorchester.

== Post Office ==
The municipality's post office is named Ravignan, after French Jesuit Gustave Delacroix de Ravignan, who was a preacher at Notre-Dame de Paris.

== Notable people ==
- Alexandra Labelle (born 1996), professional ice hockey forward for the Montreal Victoire
