= Saint-Benjamin, Quebec =

Saint-Benjamin
- Municipality
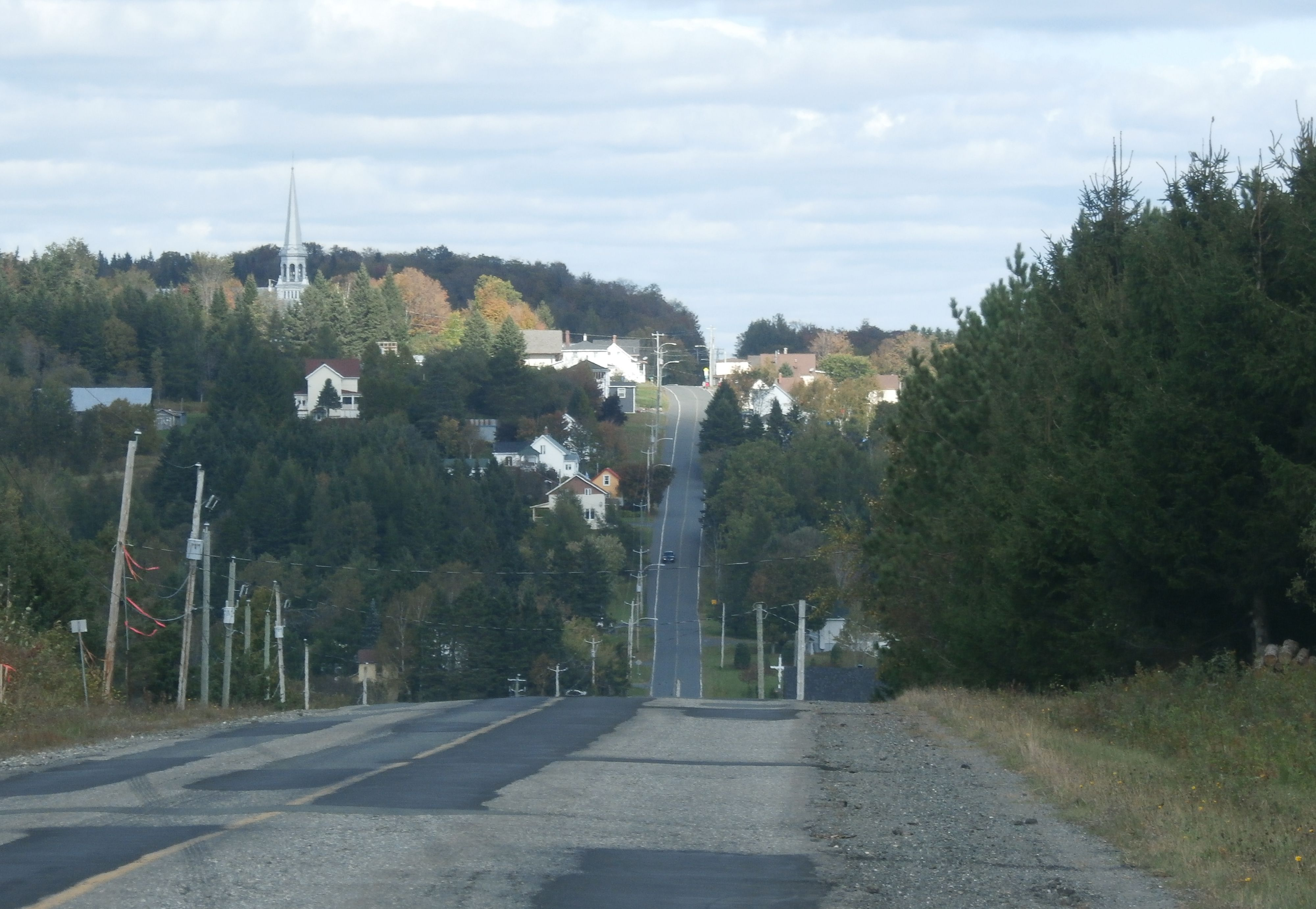
- Downtown Saint-Benjamin

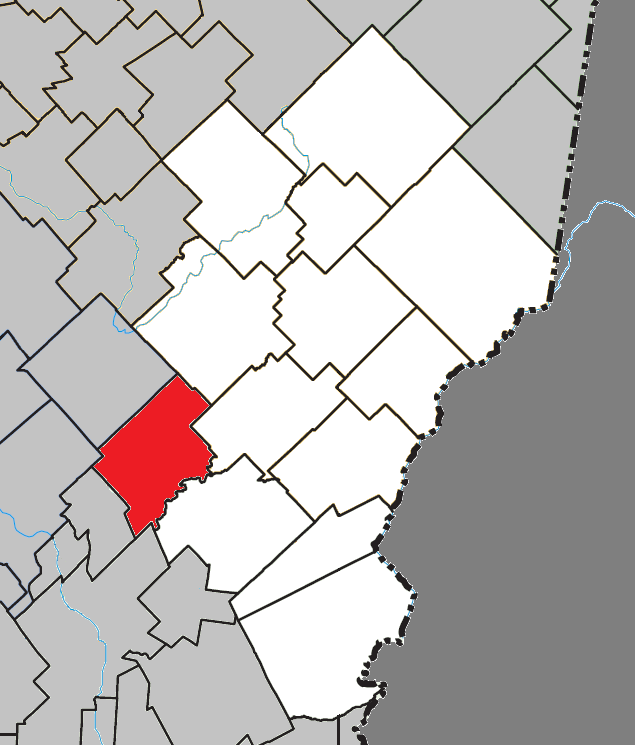
- Location within Les Etchemins RCM.

- Location in southern Quebec.
- Coordinates: 46°17′N 70°36′W
- Country: Canada
- Province: Quebec
- Region: Chaudière-Appalaches
- RCM: Les Etchemins
- Constituted: January 9, 1897

Government
  - Mayor: Alex Veilleux
  - Federal riding: Beauce
  - Prov. riding: Beauce-Sud

Area
  - Total: 112.50 km^{2} (43.44 sq mi)
  - Land: 111.53 km^{2} (43.06 sq mi)

Population (2021)
  - Total: 1,090
  - Density: 9.8/km^{2} (25/sq mi)
  - Pop 2016-2021: ▲10.4%
  - Dwellings: 493
- Time zone: UTC−5 (EST)
  - Summer (DST): UTC−4 (EDT)
- Postal code(s): G0M 1N0
- Area codes: 418 and 581
- Highways: R-275
- Website: www.st-benjamin.qc.ca

Saint-Benjamin (French pronunciation: [sɛ̃ bɛ̃ʒamɛ̃]) is a municipality in Les Etchemins Regional County Municipality in Quebec, Canada. It is part of the Chaudière-Appalaches region and the population is 1,090 as of the Canada 2021 Census. It is named in tribute to Reverend Benjamin Demers, promoter of the new parish in 1895.

The Caron twins grew up in Saint-Benjamin.

== History ==
Originally, the territory were Saint-Benjamin is located was known as Saint-François-de-la-Beauce. The boundaries were roughly similar of those of the current city of Beauceville. In 1855, From those boundaries emerged the Parish of Saint-François from witch Saint-Benjamin spitted away in 1897.

== Demographics ==
In the 2021 Census of Population conducted by Statistics Canada, Saint-Benjamin had a population of 1,090 living in 461 of its 493 total private dwellings, a change of 10.4% from its 2016 population of 987. With a land area of 111.53 km^{2} (43.06 sq mi), it had a population density of 9.8/km^{2} (25.3/sq mi) in 2021.
