= Sainte-Sabine, Chaudière-Appalaches, Quebec =

Sainte-Sabine
- Parish municipality
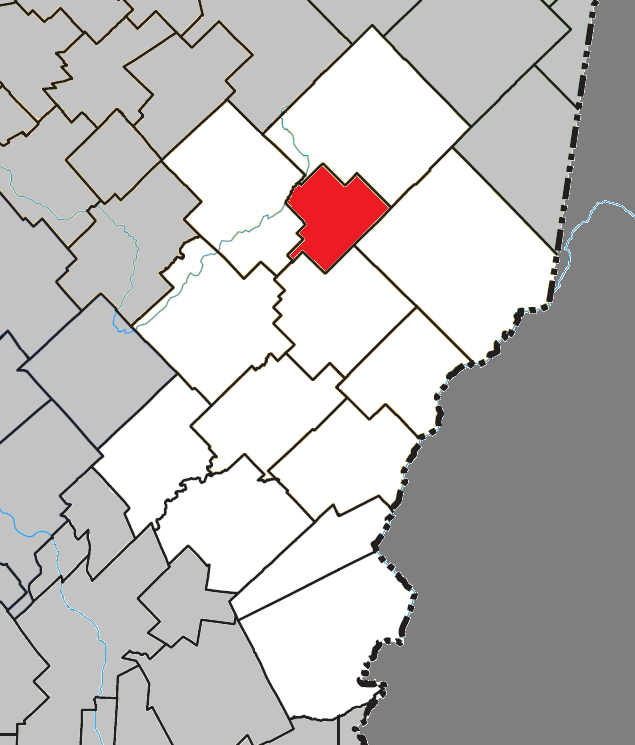
- Location within Les Etchemins RCM.

- Location in southern Quebec.
- Coordinates: 46°29′N 70°21′W
- Country: Canada
- Province: Quebec
- Region: Chaudière-Appalaches
- RCM: Les Etchemins
- Constituted: August 26, 1908

Government
  - Mayor: Luce Bisson
  - Federal riding: Bellechasse—Les Etchemins—Lévis
  - Prov. riding: Bellechasse

Area
  - Total: 68.00 km^{2} (26.25 sq mi)
  - Land: 66.60 km^{2} (25.71 sq mi)

Population (2011)
  - Total: 386
  - Density: 5.8/km^{2} (15/sq mi)
  - Pop 2006-2011: ▼5.4%
  - Dwellings: 235
- Time zone: UTC−5 (EST)
  - Summer (DST): UTC−4 (EDT)
- Postal code(s): G0R 4H0
- Area codes: 418 and 581
- Highways: No major routes
- Website: www.ste-sabine.qc.ca

Sainte-Sabine (French pronunciation: [sɛ̃t sabin]) is a parish municipality in Les Etchemins Regional County Municipality in the Chaudière-Appalaches region of Quebec, Canada. Its population is 386 as of the Canada 2011 Census.

It is named after the Basilica of Saint Sabina at the Aventine, where cardinal Louis-Nazaire Bégin often went during his theology studies in Rome.

== Demographics ==
In the 2021 Census of Population conducted by Statistics Canada, Sainte-Sabine had a population of 343 living in 195 of its 237 total private dwellings, a change of −4.2% from its 2016 population of 358. With a land area of 66.89 km^{2} (25.83 sq mi), it had a population density of 5.1/km^{2} (13.3/sq mi) in 2021.

== Bibliography ==
- Commission de toponymie du Québec
- Ministère des Affaires municipales, des Régions et de l'Occupation du territoire
