= Gabriel River =

River in Chaudière-Appalaches, Quebec (Canada)

- Location within Quebec
- Native name: Rivière Gabriel (French)

Location
- Country: Canada
- Province: Quebec
- Region: Chaudière-Appalaches
- MRC: Bellechasse Regional County Municipality

Physical characteristics
- Source: Mountain stream
  - location: Saint-Paul-de-Montminy
  - coordinates: 46.683549°N 70.315484°W
  - elevation: 540 metres (1,770 ft)
- Mouth: Rivière du Sud (Montmagny)
  - location: Saint-Philémon
  - coordinates: 46.69667°N 70.43305°W
  - elevation: 357 metres (1,171 ft)
- Length: 13.2 kilometres (8.2 mi)

Basin features
- Progression: Rivière du Pin (rivière du Sud tributary), Rivière du Sud (Montmagny), St. Lawrence River
- Tributaries
  - left: (upstream) Ruisseau à Clément
  - right: (upstream) Rivière du Nord

The Gabriel River (in French: rivière Gabriel) is a tributary of the east bank of the rivière du Pin which flows northward to the south bank of the rivière du Sud (Montmagny); the latter flows north-east to the south shore of the St. Lawrence River, in the administrative region of Chaudière-Appalaches, Quebec, Canada .

== Toponymy ==
The toponym Rivière Gabriel was formalized on December 5, 1968, at the Commission de toponymie du Québec.

== See also ==
- List of rivers of Quebec
