= Lamarche, Quebec =

Lamarche
- Municipality
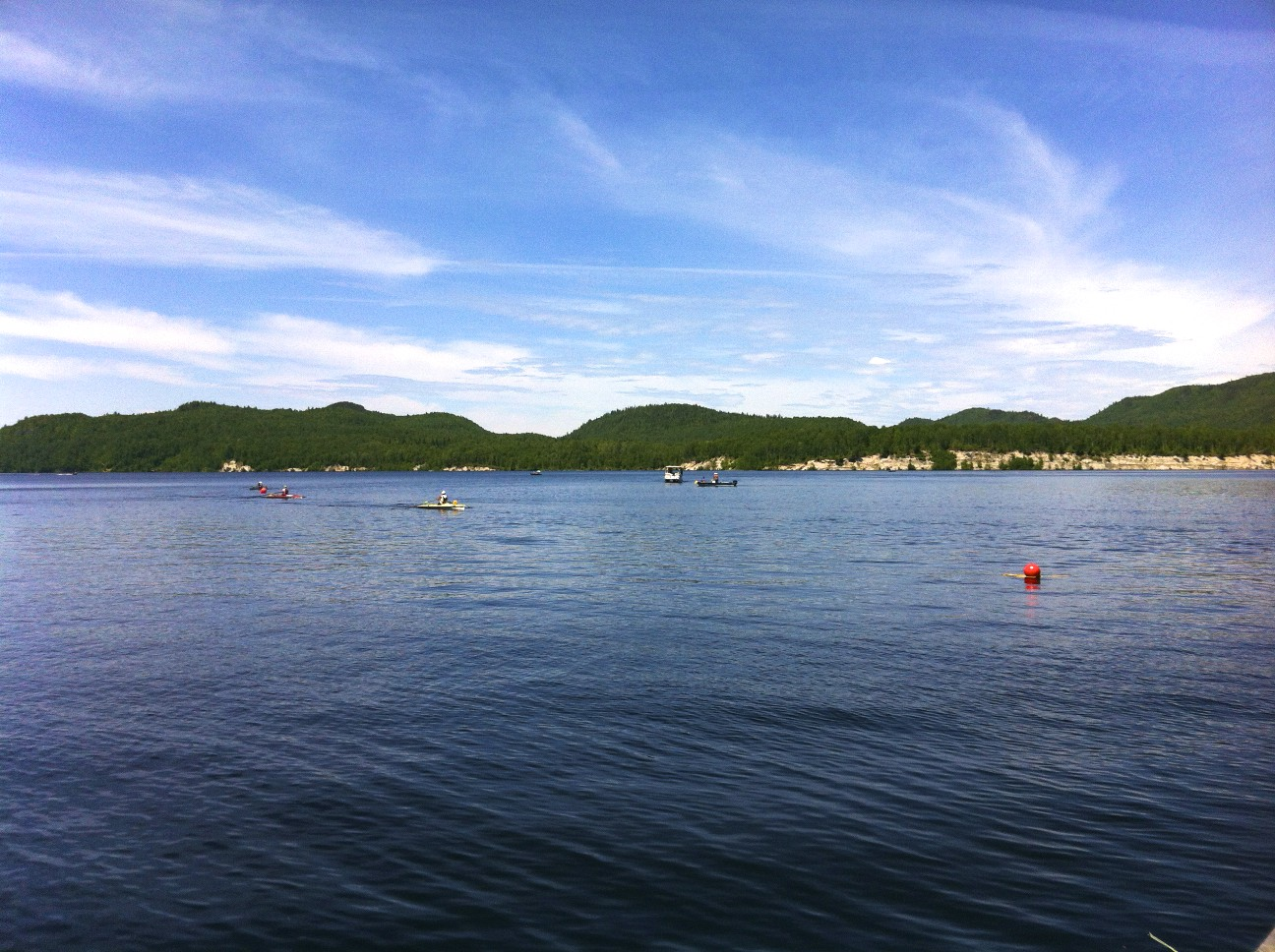

- Location in Saguenay–Lac-Saint-Jean Quebec
- Coordinates: 48°48′N 71°26′W
- Country: Canada
- Province: Quebec
- Region: Saguenay–Lac-Saint-Jean
- RCM: Lac-Saint-Jean-Est
- Settled: 1930
- Constituted: January 1, 1967

Government
  - Mayor: Michel Bergeron
  - Federal riding: Jonquière—Hébertville—Pays-des-Bleuets
  - Prov. riding: Lac-Saint-Jean

Area
  - Total: 92.60 km^{2} (35.75 sq mi)
  - Land: 81.45 km^{2} (31.45 sq mi)

Population (2021)
  - Total: 476
  - Density: 5.8/km^{2} (15/sq mi)
  - Pop 2016-2021: ▼7.4%
  - Dwellings: 396
- Time zone: UTC−5 (EST)
  - Summer (DST): UTC−4 (EDT)
- Postal code(s): G0W 1X0
- Area codes: 418 and 581
- Highways: No major routes
- Website: municipalitelamarche.ca

Lamarche (French pronunciation: [lamaʁʃ]) is a municipality in Quebec, Canada.

== Demographics ==
Population trend:

- Population in 2021: 476 (2016 to 2021 population change: -7.4%)
- Population in 2016: 514
- Population in 2011: 557
- Population in 2006: 562
- Population in 2001: 527
- Population in 1996: 564
- Population in 1991: 562
- Population in 1986: 564
- Population in 1981: 591
- Population in 1976: 565
- Population in 1971: 587

Private dwellings occupied by usual residents: 255 (total dwellings: 396)

Mother tongue:

- English as first language: 1.1%
- French as first language: 98.9%
- English and French as first language: 0%
- Other as first language: 0%

== Education ==
The Central Quebec School Board serves the municipality.

== See also ==
- List of municipalities in Quebec
