= Sainte-Jeanne-d'Arc-de-la-Mitis =

Sainte-Jeanne-d’Arc-de-la-Mitis
- Municipality
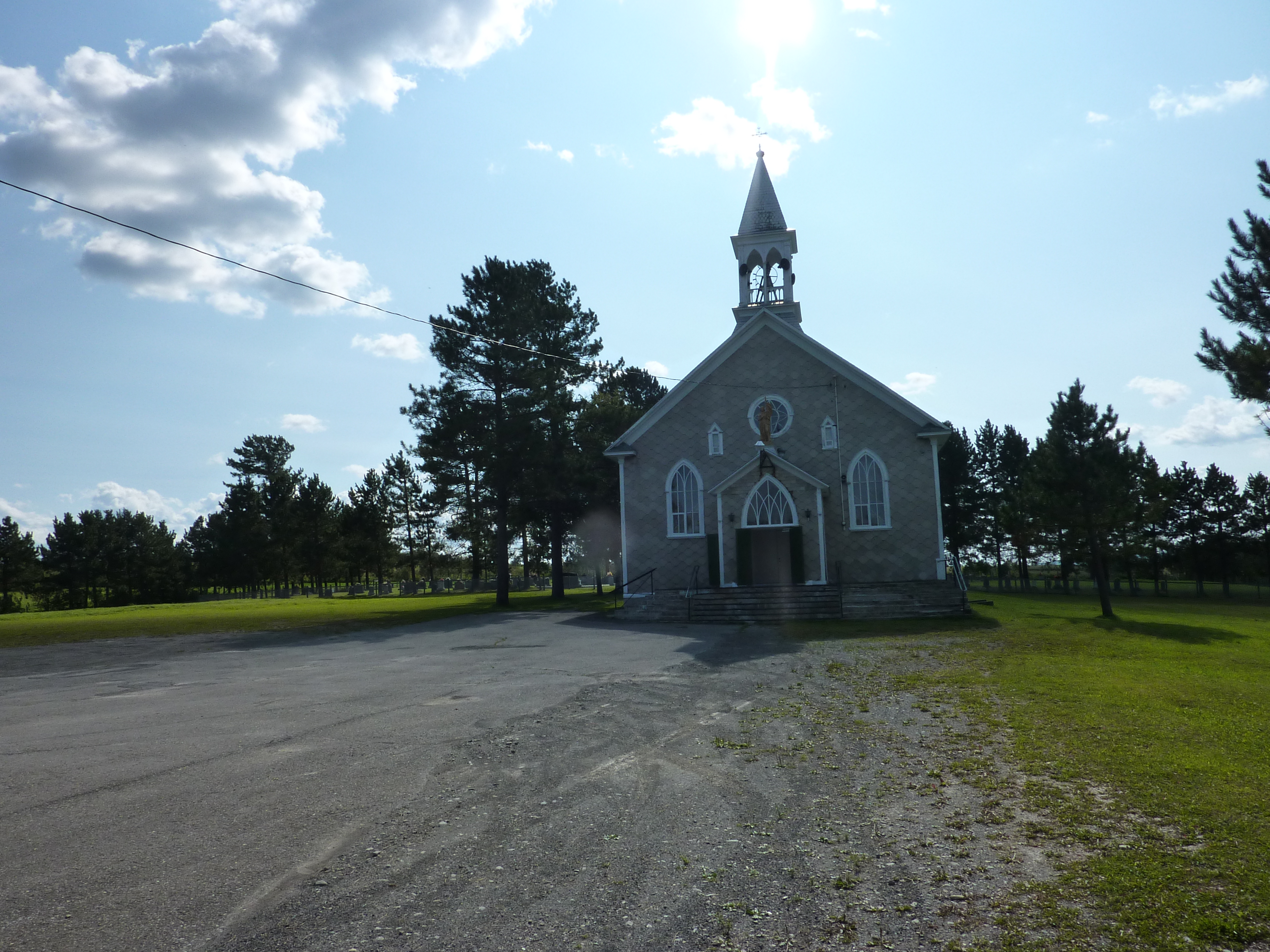
- Church of Sainte-Jeanne-d'Arc-de-la-Mitis

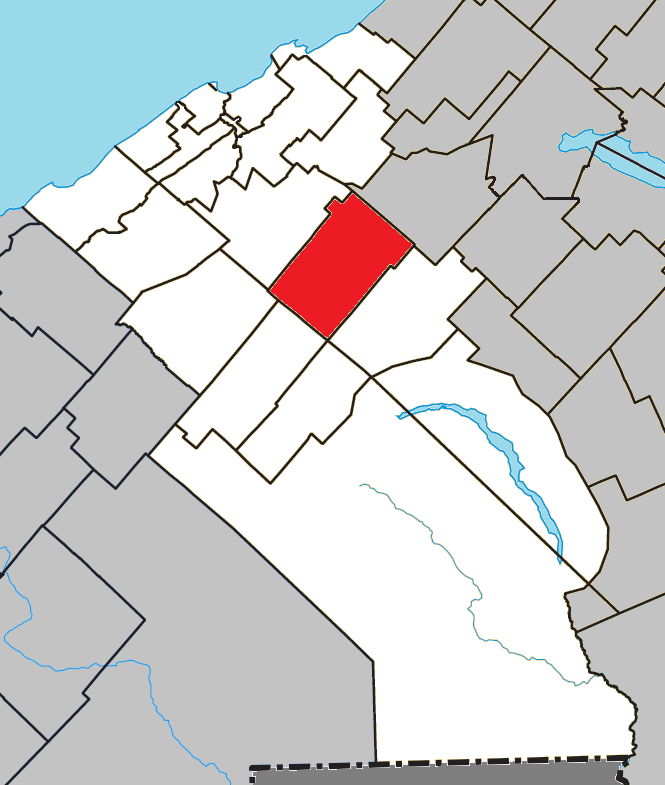
- Location within La Mitis RCM

- Location in eastern Quebec
- Coordinates: 48.4955595°N 67.9615137°W
- Country: Canada
- Province: Quebec
- Region: Bas-Saint-Laurent
- RCM: La Mitis
- Constituted: January 30, 1922

Government
  - Mayor: Michel Verrault
  - Federal riding: Rimouski-Neigette—Mitis—Matapédia—Les Basques
  - Prov. riding: Matane-Matapédia-Mitis

Area
  - Total: 112.80 km^{2} (43.55 sq mi)
  - Land: 110.34 km^{2} (42.60 sq mi)

Population (2021)
  - Total: 217
  - Density: 2/km^{2} (5.2/sq mi)
  - Pop 2016-2021: ▼22.5%
  - Dwellings: 146
- Time zone: UTC−5 (EST)
  - Summer (DST): UTC−4 (EDT)
- Postal code(s): G0J 2T0
- Area codes: 418 and 581
- Highways: R-132
- Website: www.municipalite.sainte-jeanne-darc.qc.ca

Sainte-Jeanne-d’Arc-de-la-Mitis (French pronunciation: [sɛ̃t ʒan daʁk də la mitis]) is a municipality in La Mitis Regional County Municipality in the Bas-Saint-Laurent region of Quebec, Canada. Its population in the Canada 2021 Census was 217.

== Demographics ==
In the 2021 Census of Population conducted by Statistics Canada, Sainte-Jeanne-d’Arc-de-la-Mitis had a population of 217 living in 110 of its 146 total private dwellings, a change of −22.5% from its 2016 population of 280. With a land area of 110.34 km^{2} (42.60 sq mi), it had a population density of 2.0/km^{2} (5.1/sq mi) in 2021.

Canada census – Sainte-Jeanne-d’Arc-de-la-Mitis community profile

	2021	2016	2011
Population	217 (-22.5% from 2016)	280 (-10.5% from 2011)	313 (-2.8% from 2006)
Land area	110.34 km^{2} (42.60 sq mi)	110.55 km^{2} (42.68 sq mi)	109.86 km^{2} (42.42 sq mi)
Population density	2.0/km^{2} (5.2/sq mi)	2.5/km^{2} (6.5/sq mi)	2.8/km^{2} (7.3/sq mi)
Median age	54.8 (M: 54.4, F: 54.8)	50.4 (M: 48.2, F: 51.1)	45.7 (M: 47.0, F: 45.1)
Private dwellings	146 (total)	169 (total)	149 (total)
Median household income	$n/a	$41,280	$34,053

References: 2021 2016 2011

Historical Census Data - Sainte-Jeanne-d’Arc-de-la-Mitis, Quebec
Year	Pop.	±%
1931	794	—
1941	955	+20.3%
1951	1,037	+8.6%
1956	1,099	+6.0%
1961	1,057	−3.8%
1966	951	−10.0%
1971	720	−24.3%
1976	537	−25.4%
1981	483	−10.1%
1986	451	−6.6%
1991	369	−18.2%
1996	371	+0.5%
2001	354	−4.6%
2006	322	−9.0%
2011	313	−2.8%
2016	280	−10.5%
2021	217	−22.5%

=== Language ===
Canada Census Mother Tongue - Sainte-Jeanne-d’Arc-de-la-Mitis, Quebec
Census	Total	French			English			French & English			Other		
Year	Responses	Count	Trend	Pop %	Count	Trend	Pop %	Count	Trend	Pop %	Count	Trend	Pop %
2021	220	210	▼25.0%	95.5%	0	0.0%	0.0%	0	0.0%	0.0%	0	0.0%	0.0%
2016	280	280	▼9.7%	100.0%	0	0.0%	0.0%	0	0.0%	0.0%	0	0.0%	0.0%
2011	310	310	▼12.7%	100.0%	0	0.0%	0.0%	0	0.0%	0.0%	0	0.0%	0.0%
2006	360	355	▲6.0%	98.6%	0	0.0%	0.0%	0	0.0%	0.0%	0	▼100.0%	0.0%
2001	355	335	▼5.6%	94.4%	0	0.0%	0.0%	0	0.0%	0.0%	15	0.0%	4.2%
1996	370	355	n/a	95.9%	0	n/a	0.0%	0	n/a	0.0%	15	n/a	4.1%

== See also ==
- List of municipalities in Quebec
