= Saint-Cyprien, Chaudière-Appalaches =

Saint-Cyprien
- Parish municipality
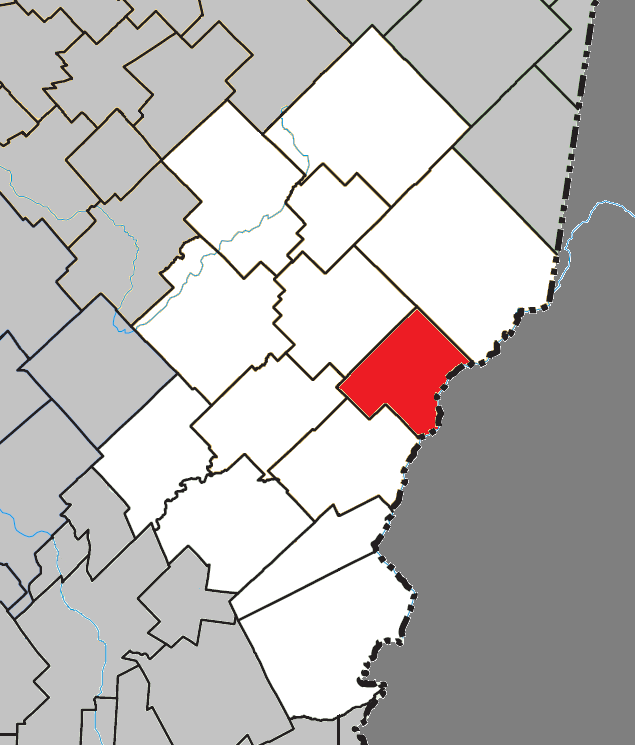
- Location within Les Etchemins RCM.

- Location in southern Quebec.
- Coordinates: 46°21′N 70°16′W
- Country: Canada
- Province: Quebec
- Region: Chaudière-Appalaches
- RCM: Les Etchemins
- Constituted: February 22, 1918

Government
  - Mayor: Michel Bernard
  - Federal riding: Bellechasse—Les Etchemins—Lévis
  - Prov. riding: Bellechasse

Area
  - Total: 94.20 km^{2} (36.37 sq mi)
  - Land: 93.52 km^{2} (36.11 sq mi)

Population (2016)
  - Total: 490
  - Density: 5.2/km^{2} (13/sq mi)
  - Pop 2011-2016: ▼10.6%
  - Dwellings: 308
- Time zone: UTC−5 (EST)
  - Summer (DST): UTC−4 (EDT)
- Postal code(s): G0R 1B0
- Area codes: 418 and 581
- Highways: No major routes
- Website: www.st-cyprien.qc.ca

Saint-Cyprien (French pronunciation: [sɛ̃ sipʁijɛ̃]) is a parish in the Les Etchemins Regional County Municipality in Quebec, Canada. It is part of the Chaudière-Appalaches region and the population is 490 as of 2016. It is named after Christian martyr Cyprian.

Saint-Cyprien lies on the Canada–United States border.

== Demographics ==
In the 2021 Census of Population conducted by Statistics Canada, Saint-Cyprien had a population of 474 living in 238 of its 290 total private dwellings, a change of −3.3% from its 2016 population of 490. With a land area of 93.48 km^{2} (36.09 sq mi), it had a population density of 5.1/km^{2} (13.1/sq mi) in 2021.

Population trend:

- Population in 2016: 490 (2011 to 2016 population change: -10.6%)
- Population in 2011: 548
- Population in 2006: 630
- Population in 2001: 603
- Population in 1996: 617
- Population in 1991: 664
- Population in 1986: 769
- Population in 1981: 838
- Population in 1976: 776
- Population in 1971: 905
- Population in 1966: 1,056
- Population in 1961: 1,101
- Population in 1956: 1,104
- Population in 1951: 1,058
- Population in 1941: 950
- Population in 1931: 626
- Population in 1921: 444

== Education ==
The South Shore Protestant Regional School Board previously served the municipality.
