= Massif du Sud =

Ski Mountain in Quebec, Canada

Le Massif du Sud
- Interactive map of Le Massif du Sud
- Location: Notre-Dame-Auxiliatrice-de-Buckland, Quebec, Canada
- Nearest city: Quebec City, 90 km (56 mi)
- Coordinates: 46°36′51″N 70°29′7″W
- Vertical: 400 m (1,300 ft)
- Top elevation: 915 m (3,002 ft)
- Base elevation: 515 m (1,690 ft)
- Skiable area: 90 acres (36 ha)
- Trails: 17 total 14% Easy; 17% Intermediate; 31% Difficult; 38% Extremely difficult
- Longest run: 3.5 km (2.2 mi)
- Lift system: 2 total 1 quad 1 surface lift
- Lift capacity: 1,600 skiers/hr
- Snowfall: 600 cm (240 in)
- Night skiing: no
- Website: Massif du Sud

The Massif du Sud is a ski mountain about 90 km (60 mi) southeast of Quebec City, Canada. It is part of the park of the same name, the Parc du Massif du Sud.

== Description ==
The Massif du Sud is located between the villages of Saint-Magloire and Saint-Philémon in Bellechasse, Québec, Canada.

Often confounded with Le Massif, the Massif du Sud is renowned for its natural snow and its glades. Although it is the highest ski mountain in the Quebec province, it doesn't boast the biggest vertical because of its base, already at 515 m (1,690 ft). The Massif du Sud also offers 30 km (20 mi) of cross-country skiing and 20 km (10 mi) of snowshoeing trails.

In summer, it is possible to go hiking, with more than 92 km (60 mi) of trails and 46 km (30 mi) of multifunctional trails (bike, horse).

== History ==
The Massif du Sud was first opened in 1989, but has since changed owner many times.

In 2011, a wind power project materializes. The wind farm was inaugurated in January 2013. The wind turbines are operated by EDF Renewables and Enbridge.

Building on its fame in backcountry glades, the resort has a snowcat-skiing operation in the backcountry region and will introduce heliskiing in the 2011 season. It is the only resort in eastern North America to have heliskiing.

== See also ==
- Le Massif de Charlevoix
- Mont-Sainte-Anne
- Stoneham
- List of ski areas and resorts in Canada
