= Etchemin River =

River in Quebec, Canada

Coordinates: 46°45′48″N 71°13′51″W

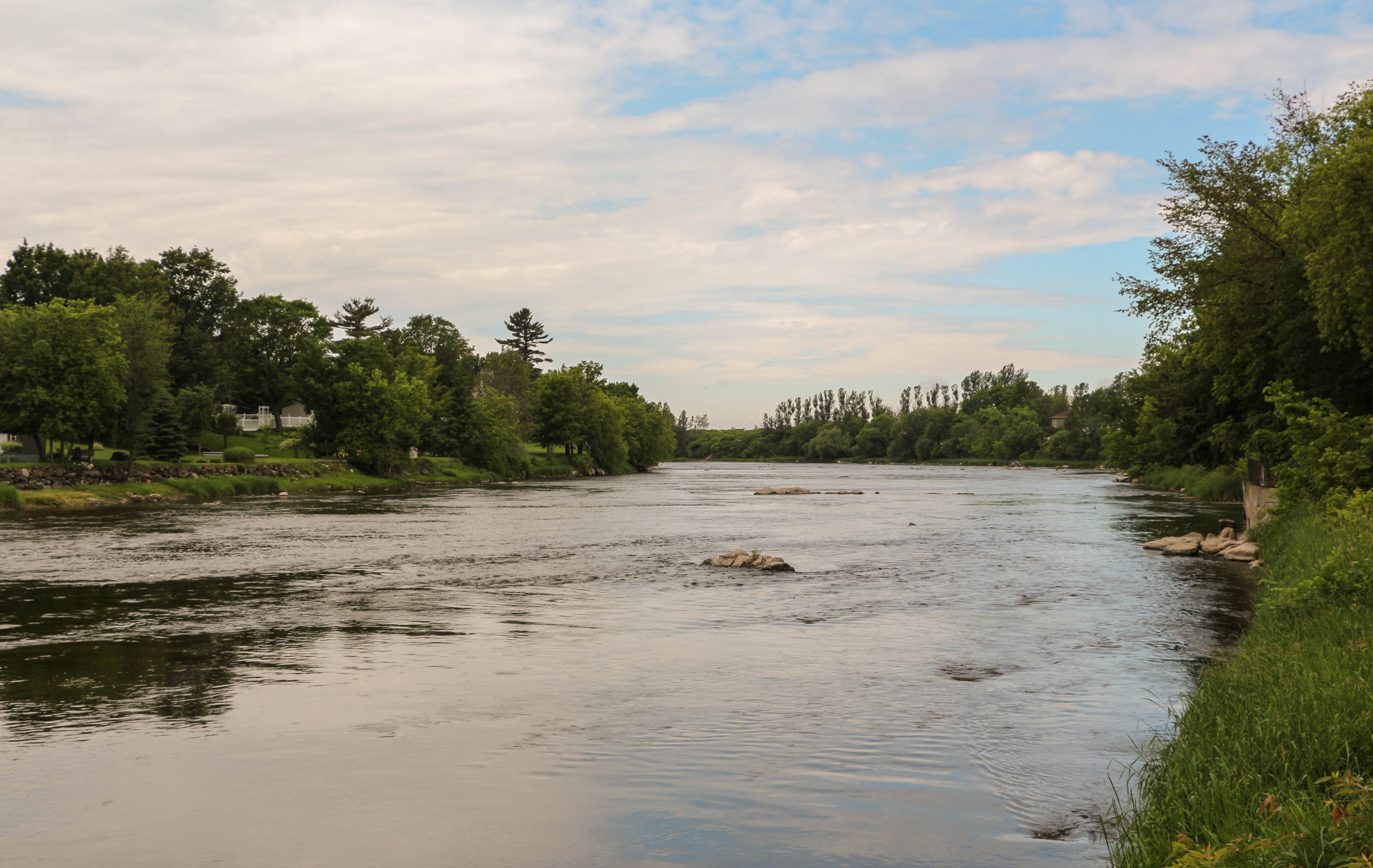
The Etchemin River in Saint-Henri

The Etchemin River is a river in the Chaudière-Appalaches region of eastern Quebec.

It gave its name to Les Etchemins Regional County Municipality. The river itself was named for the Abenaki native people of the area who the French called "les Etchemins." The source of the river is not Etchemin Lake but a little east of the lake, in Saint-Luc-de-Bellechasse.

The Etchemin River, which had become been the victim of pollution for decades, became the topic of conversation in 1993, when a few residents of Saint-Léon-de-Standon began work on a project to revive the Atlantic salmon in the river. The project was scoffed at in the beginning since damming and logging along the Etchemin's shore and agricultural runoff and dumping had polluted the river so much that Atlantic salmon had been last seen there two centuries earlier. Although the odds were against them, locals from different riverbank communities began work on the river and formed the Comité de restauration de la rivière Etchemin (CRRE). Work then began to plant over 15,000 trees on the riverbanks and to make salmon-friendly rapids and shelters for spawning. In 2002, the first adult Atlantic salmon was spotted in the river.

== See also ==
- List of rivers of Quebec
