= Armagh, Quebec =

Armagh
- Municipality
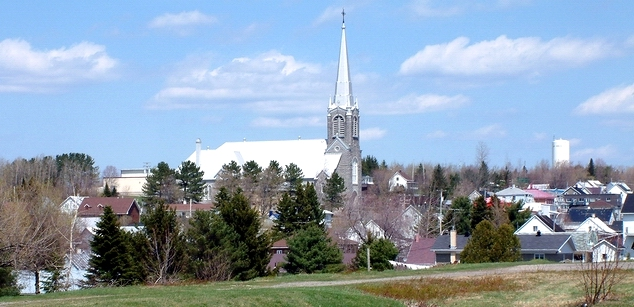

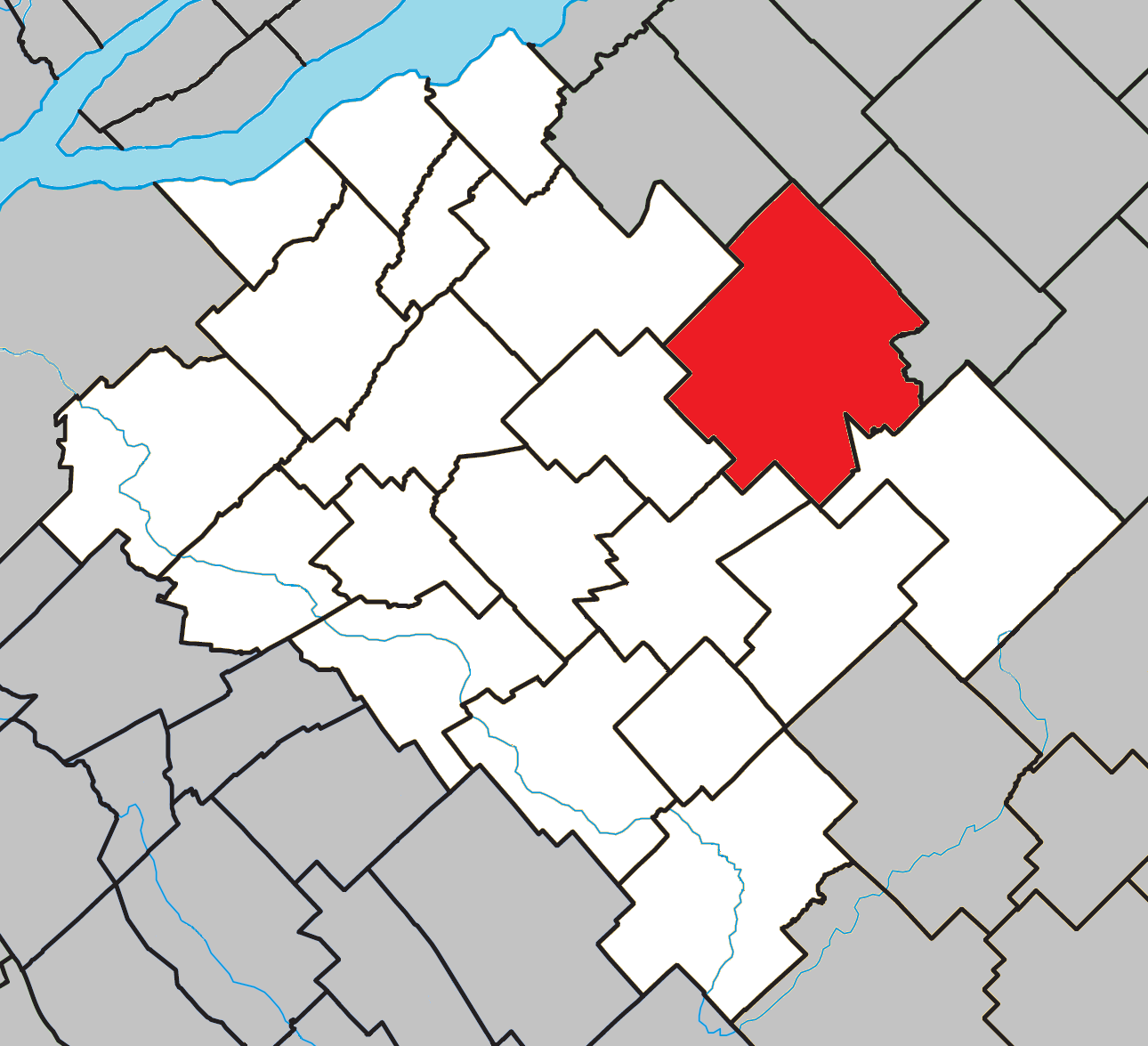
- Location within Bellechasse RCM.

- Location in province of Quebec.
- Coordinates: 46°45′N 70°35′W
- Country: Canada
- Province: Quebec
- Region: Chaudière-Appalaches
- RCM: Bellechasse
- Constituted: December 29, 1993
- Named for: Armagh

Government
  - Mayor: Suzie Bernier
  - Federal riding: Bellechasse—Les Etchemins—Lévis
  - Prov. riding: Bellechasse

Area
  - Total: 170.10 km^{2} (65.68 sq mi)
  - Land: 167.99 km^{2} (64.86 sq mi)

Population (2021)
  - Total: 1,439
  - Density: 8.6/km^{2} (22/sq mi)
  - Pop 2016-2021: ▼3.3%
  - Dwellings: 785
- Time zone: UTC−5 (EST)
  - Summer (DST): UTC−4 (EDT)
- Postal code(s): G0R 1A0
- Area codes: 418 and 581
- Highways: R-281
- Website: www.armagh.ca

Armagh (2021 Population 1,439) is a municipality in the Bellechasse Regional County Municipality in the Chaudière-Appalaches region of Quebec. Its coordinates are 46°45′N 70°35′W.

It was named after Armagh in Northern Ireland.

== Demographics ==
In the 2021 Census of Population conducted by Statistics Canada, Armagh had a population of 1,439 living in 686 of its 785 total private dwellings, a change of −3.3% from its 2016 population of 1,488. With a land area of 167.99 km^{2} (64.86 sq mi), it had a population density of 8.6/km^{2} (22.2/sq mi) in 2021.

Canada census – Armagh community profile

	2021	2016	2011
Population	1,439 (-3.3% from 2016)	1,488 (-0.2% from 2011)	1,491 (-7.6% from 2006)
Land area	167.99 km^{2} (64.86 sq mi)	168.04 km^{2} (64.88 sq mi)	168.36 km^{2} (65.00 sq mi)
Population density	8.6/km^{2} (22/sq mi)	8.9/km^{2} (23/sq mi)	8.9/km^{2} (23/sq mi)
Median age	52.8 (M: 52.0, F: 53.2)	51.8 (M: 52.2, F: 51.5)	50.5 (M: 49.5, F: 51.5)
Private dwellings	785 (total) 686 (occupied)	807 (total)	787 (total)
Median household income	$55,200	$46,029	$35,546

Notes: Population in 1996: 1,604 (-3.0% from 1991) - Population in 1991: 1,654
References: 2021 2016 2011
