= Saint-Magloire, Quebec =

Saint-Magloire
- Municipality
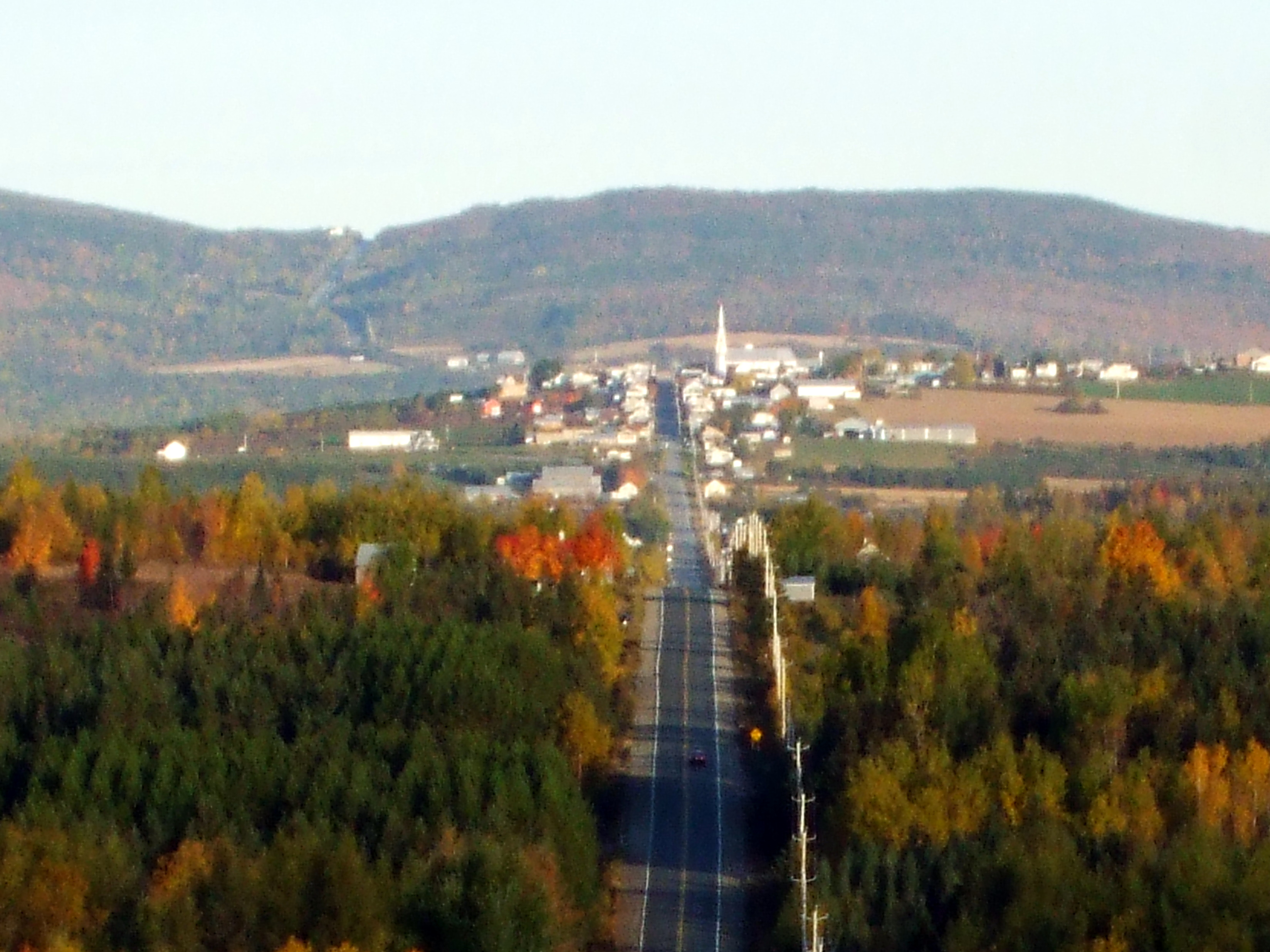

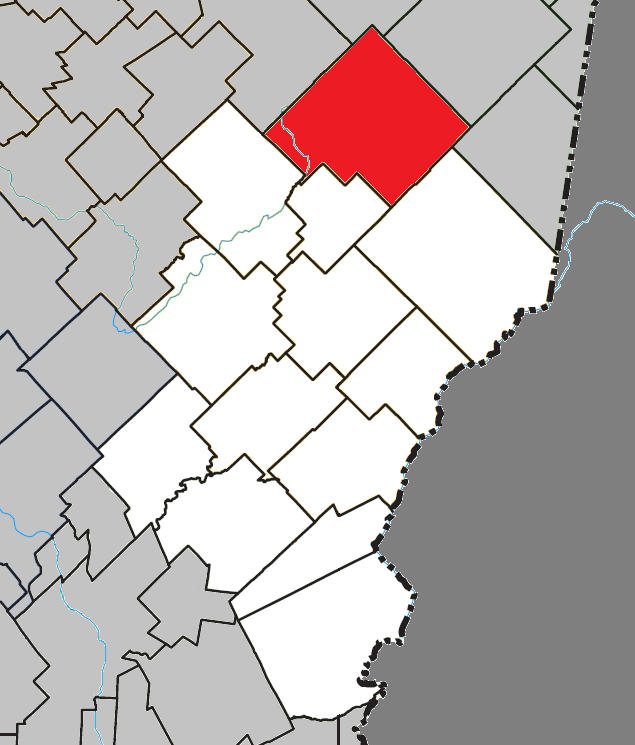
- Location within Les Etchemins RCM.

- Location in southern Quebec.
- Coordinates: 46°35′N 70°17′W
- Country: Canada
- Province: Quebec
- Region: Chaudière-Appalaches
- RCM: Les Etchemins
- Constituted: January 1, 1875

Government
  - Mayor: Jean Tanguay
  - Federal riding: Bellechasse—Les Etchemins—Lévis
  - Prov. riding: Bellechasse

Area
  - Total: 208.70 km^{2} (80.58 sq mi)
  - Land: 208.61 km^{2} (80.54 sq mi)

Population (2021)
  - Total: 712
  - Density: 3.4/km^{2} (8.8/sq mi)
  - Pop 2016-2021: ▲5.3%
  - Dwellings: 471
- Time zone: UTC−5 (EST)
  - Summer (DST): UTC−4 (EDT)
- Postal code(s): G0R 3M0
- Area codes: 418 and 581
- Highways: R-281
- Website: www.saint-magloire.com

Saint-Magloire (French pronunciation: [sɛ̃ maɡlwaʁ]) is a municipality in Les Etchemins Regional County Municipality in the Chaudière-Appalaches region of Quebec, Canada. Its population was 712 as of the Canada 2021 Census. It was named in tribute to reverend Joseph-Magloire Rioux, first priest of the parish in 1863.

Prior to August 16, 1997 it was known as Saint-Magloire-de-Bellechasse.

== History ==
The municipality was officially founded in 1875 under the name of Roux-Bellechasse-et-Daaquam. In 1908 it lost a significant section of its territory for the creation of Sainte-Sabine. In 1921, Saint-Camille-de-Lellis separated from Roux-Bellechasse-et-Daaquam and became its own municipality. In 1954, the name Roux-Bellechasse-et-Daaquam was replaced with Saint-Magloire-de-Bellechasse. In 1997, the name Saint-Magloire-de-Bellechasse was shortened to became simply Saint-Magloire.
