= Saint-Luc-de-Bellechasse =

- Municipality
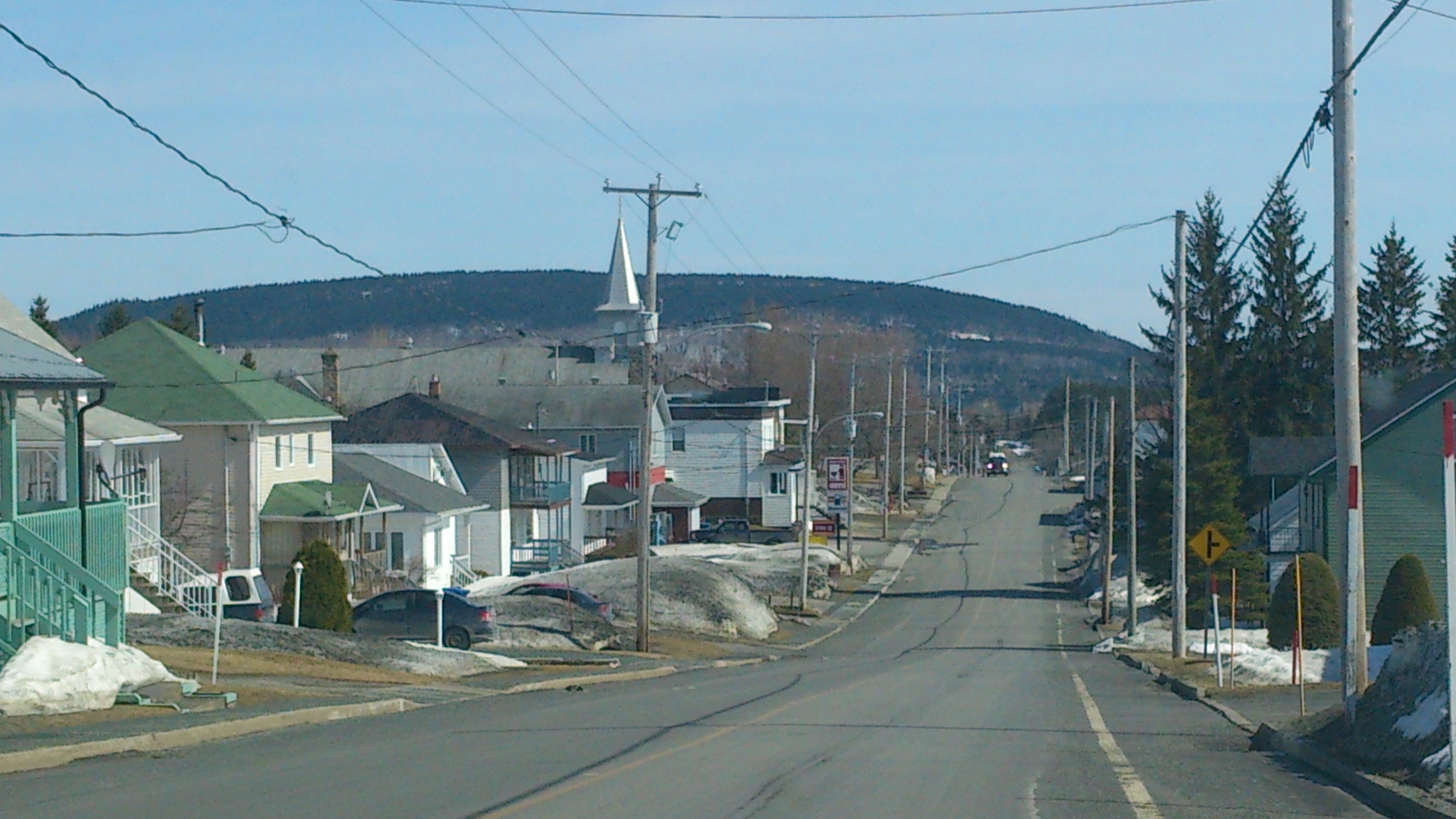

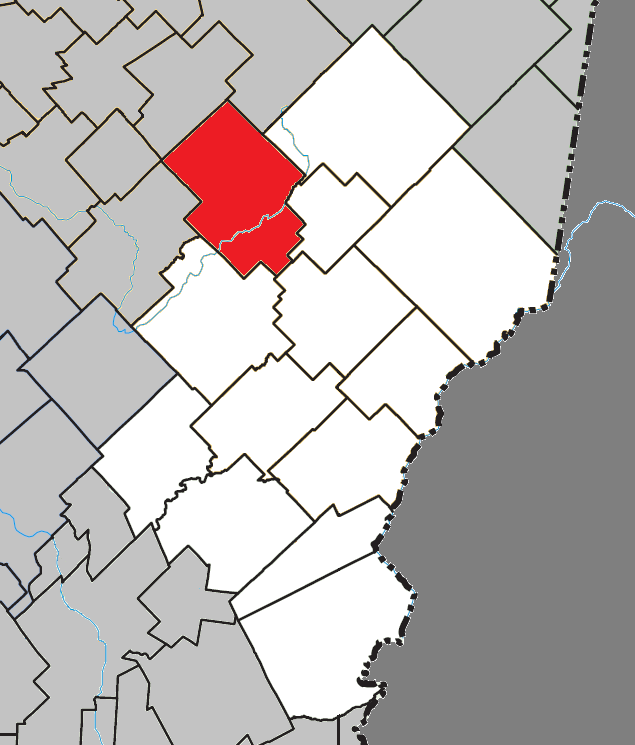
- Location within Les Etchemins RCM.

- Location in southern Quebec.
- Coordinates: 46°30′N 70°29′W
- Country: Canada
- Province: Quebec
- Region: Chaudière-Appalaches
- RCM: Les Etchemins
- Constituted: August 12, 1921

Government
  - Mayor: Dominique Charrière
  - Federal riding: Bellechasse—Les Etchemins—Lévis
  - Prov. riding: Bellechasse

Area
  - Total: 159.50 km^{2} (61.58 sq mi)
  - Land: 161.99 km^{2} (62.54 sq mi)
- There is an apparent contradiction between two authoritative sources

Population (2021)
  - Total: 449
  - Density: 2.8/km^{2} (7.3/sq mi)
  - Pop 2016-2021: ▲2.8%
  - Dwellings: 325
- Time zone: UTC−5 (EST)
  - Summer (DST): UTC−4 (EDT)
- Postal code(s): G0R 1L0
- Area codes: 418 and 581
- Highways: No major routes
- Website: www.st-luc-bellechasse.qc.ca

Saint-Luc-de-Bellechasse (French pronunciation: [sɛ̃ lyk də bɛlʃas]) is a municipality in the Municipalité régionale de comté des Etchemins in Quebec, Canada. It is part of the Chaudière-Appalaches region and the population is 449 as of 2021. Originally named Saint-Abdon, it was changed to Saint-Luc-de-Dijon, due to confusion in spelling and difficulties of pronunciation. It was later renamed to Saint-Luc and since 1997, Saint-Luc-de-Bellechasse. Saint-Luc honours Luc Gilbert of Saint-Augustin-de-Portneuf, who would have given an important sum for the construction of the rector.

The source of the Etchemin River is in Saint-Luc-de-Bellechasse.
