= Notre-Dame-Auxiliatrice-de-Buckland =

- Parish municipality
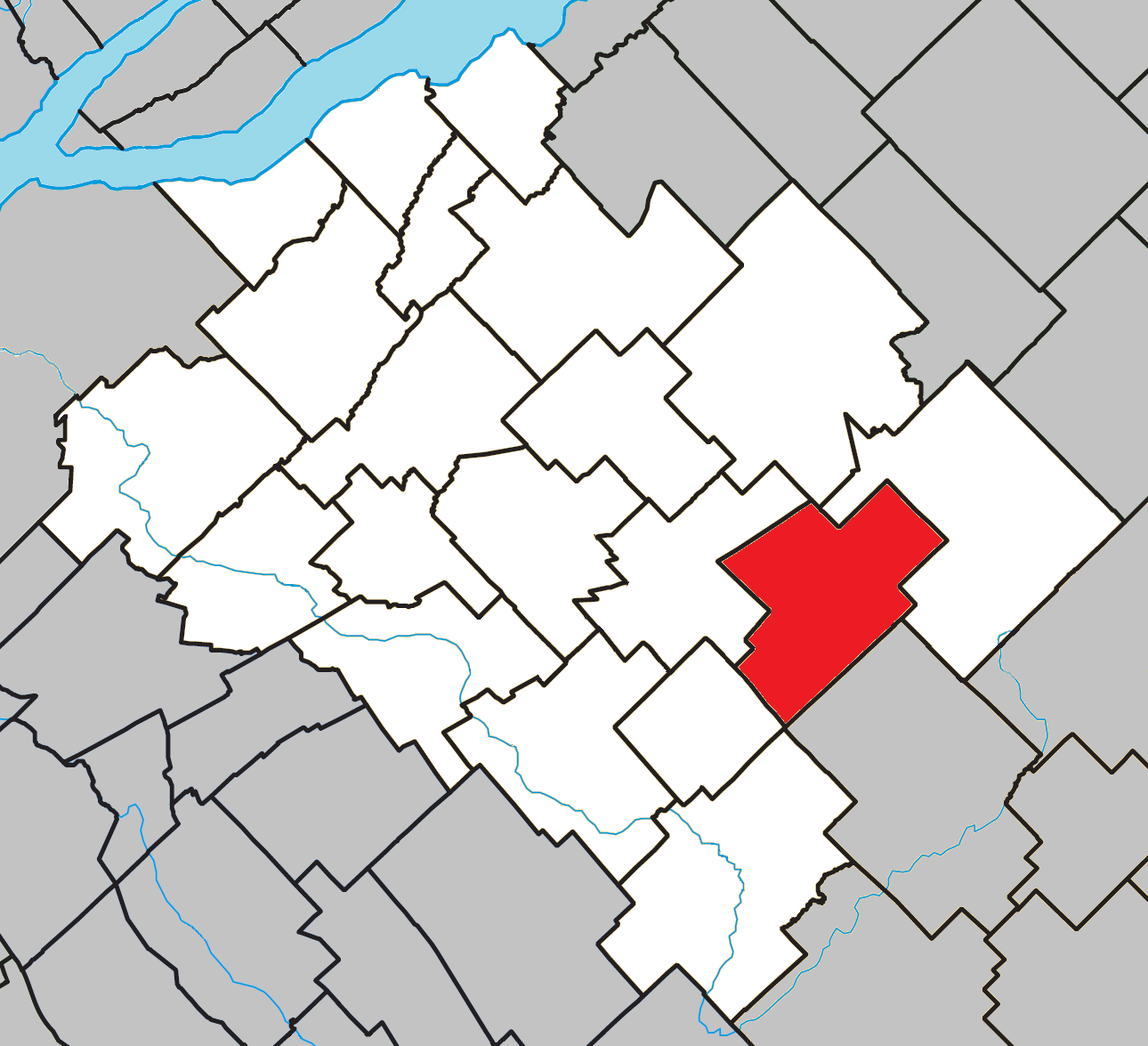
- Location within Bellechasse RCM.

- Location in province of Quebec.
- Coordinates: 46°37′N 70°33′W
- Country: Canada
- Province: Quebec
- Region: Chaudière-Appalaches
- RCM: Bellechasse
- Constituted: January 1, 1885

Government
  - Mayor: Francis Labrecque
  - Federal riding: Bellechasse—Les Etchemins—Lévis
  - Prov. riding: Bellechasse

Area
  - Total: 96.60 km^{2} (37.30 sq mi)
  - Land: 94.71 km^{2} (36.57 sq mi)

Population (2021)
  - Total: 767
  - Density: 8.1/km^{2} (21/sq mi)
  - Pop 2016-2021: ▼0.1%
  - Dwellings: 519
- Time zone: UTC−5 (EST)
  - Summer (DST): UTC−4 (EDT)
- Postal code(s): G0R 1G0
- Area codes: 418 and 581
- Highways: R-216; R-279
- Website: www.buckland.qc.ca

Notre-Dame-Auxiliatrice-de-Buckland is a parish municipality of about 800 people in the Bellechasse Regional County Municipality, in the Chaudière-Appalaches region of Quebec, Canada. Although the official name is Notre-Dame-Auxiliatrice-de-Buckland, most people refers to it as simply Buckland.

== Demographics ==
In the 2021 Census of Population conducted by Statistics Canada, Notre-Dame-Auxiliatrice-de-Buckland had a population of 767 living in 381 of its 519 total private dwellings, a change of −0.1% from its 2016 population of 768. With a land area of 94.71 km^{2} (36.57 sq mi), it had a population density of 8.1/km^{2} (21.0/sq mi) in 2021.
