= Les Etchemins Regional County Municipality =

Les Etchemins
- Regional county municipality
- Coordinates: 46°24′N 70°21′W
- Country: Canada
- Province: Quebec
- Region: Chaudière-Appalaches
- Effective: January 1, 1982
- County seat: Lac-Etchemin

Government
  - Type: Prefecture
  - Prefect: Hector Provençal

Area
  - Total: 1,819.40 km^{2} (702.47 sq mi)
  - Land: 1,810.05 km^{2} (698.86 sq mi)

Population (2016)
  - Total: 16,536
  - Density: 9.1/km^{2} (24/sq mi)
  - Change 2011-2016: ▼4.2%
  - Dwellings: 8,764
- Time zone: UTC−5 (EST)
  - Summer (DST): UTC−4 (EDT)
- Area codes: 418 and 581
- Website: www.mrcetchemins.qc.ca

Les Etchemins is a regional county municipality in the Chaudière-Appalaches region of eastern Quebec, Canada. It is named for the Etchemin River which finds its source in the region, as well as Etchemin Lake. Lac-Etchemin is the seat of the RCM. Les Etchemins can be found on the Maine border, southeast of Quebec City.

== Subdivisions ==
There are 13 subdivisions within the RCM:

Municipalities (10)

- Lac-Etchemin
- Saint-Benjamin
- Sainte-Aurélie
- Sainte-Justine
- Sainte-Rose-de-Watford
- Saint-Louis-de-Gonzague
- Saint-Luc-de-Bellechasse
- Saint-Magloire
- Saint-Prosper
- Saint-Zacharie

Parishes (3)

- Saint-Camille-de-Lellis
- Saint-Cyprien
- Sainte-Sabine

== Transportation ==
=== Access Routes ===
Highways and numbered routes that run through the municipality, including external routes that start or finish at the county border:

- Autoroutes
  - None
- Principal Highways
  - None
- Secondary Highways
  - R-204
  - R-275
  - R-277
  - R-281
- External Routes
  - None

== See also ==
- List of regional county municipalities and equivalent territories in Quebec
