= Saint-Philémon =

- Parish municipality
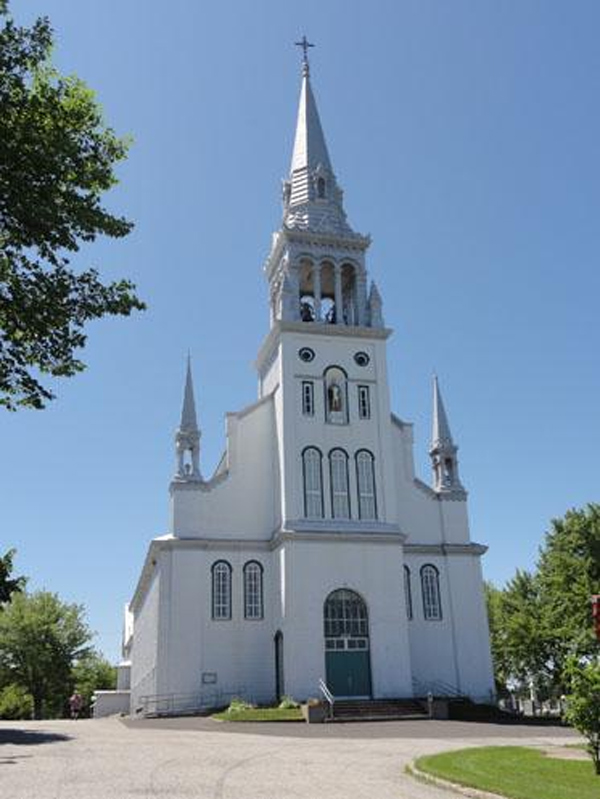
- Saint-Philémon Church

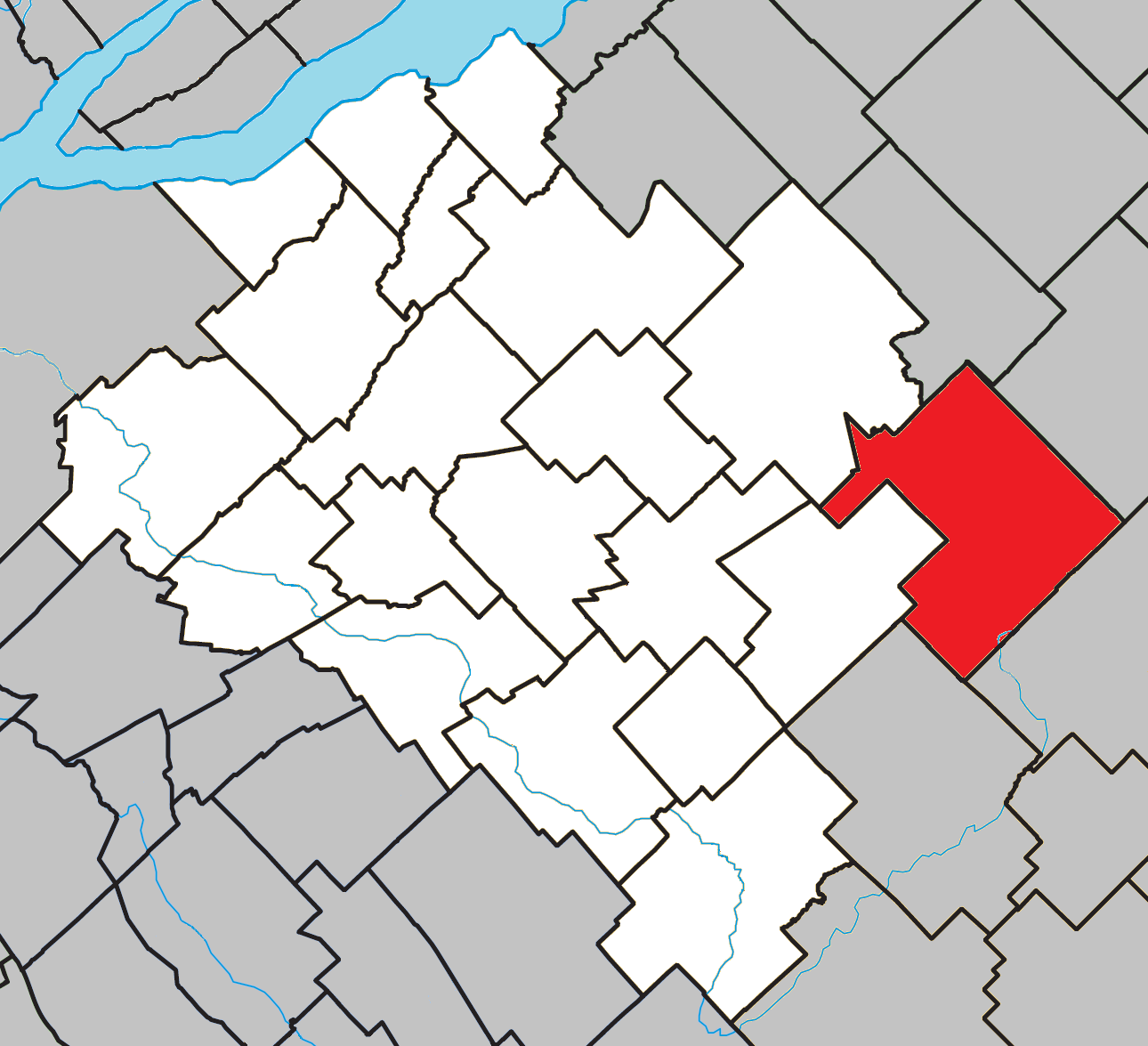
- Location within Bellechasse RCM.

- Location in province of Quebec.
- Coordinates: 46°41′N 70°27′W
- Country: Canada
- Province: Quebec
- Region: Chaudière-Appalaches
- RCM: Bellechasse
- Constituted: January 1, 1867

Government
  - Mayor: Daniel Pouliot
  - Fed. riding: Bellechasse—Les Etchemins—Lévis
  - Prov. riding: Bellechasse

Area
  - Total: 148.00 km^{2} (57.14 sq mi)
  - Land: 146.51 km^{2} (56.57 sq mi)

Population (2021)
  - Total: 680
  - Density: 4.6/km^{2} (12/sq mi)
  - Pop 2016-2021: ▼4.8%
  - Dwellings: 533
- Time zone: UTC−5 (EST)
  - Summer (DST): UTC−4 (EDT)
- Postal code(s): G0R 4A0
- Area codes: 418 and 581
- Highways: R-216; R-281
- Website: www.saintphilemon.com

Saint-Philémon (French pronunciation: [sɛ̃ filemɔ̃]) is a parish municipality of about 700 people in the Bellechasse Regional County Municipality in the Chaudière-Appalaches administrative region of Quebec.

== Demographics ==
In the 2021 Census of Population conducted by Statistics Canada, Saint-Philémon had a population of 680 living in 364 of its 533 total private dwellings, a change of −4.8% from its 2016 population of 714. With a land area of 146.51 km^{2} (56.57 sq mi), it had a population density of 4.6/km^{2} (12.0/sq mi) in 2021.

== See also ==
- Mount Chocolat
