= Marmet (surname) =

Marmet has several origins, having appeared in various regions around the world. In England, it is derived from the Old English word for marble, "marma," which also led to the English variant "Marmett." In Yiddish, the surname comes from the Yiddish word for marble, "marmer." In France, it has multiple origins: it can stem from the French word for marble, "marme," or serve as a toponymic surname for someone from a place called Marmettes. Additionally, it can also be derived from the French word for child, "marmot." The surname Marmet was first recorded in 1180 in Chartres, France.

Notable people with the surname include:

- Otto Marmet (1826–1899), German-Ohioan coal proprietor
- Jürg Marmet (1927–2013), Swiss mountaineer
- Paul Marmet (1932–2005), Canadian physicist and professor

== People with similar surnames ==
- Marie-Louise Marmette (1870–1928), French-Canadian author and lecturer
- Joseph Marmette (1844–1895), Canadian novelist and historian
- Jean Mermet (born 1932) French cross-country skier
- Auguste Mermet (1810–1889), French opera composter
- Julien Augustin Joseph Mermet (1772–1837) French military General

== List of surnames derived from/variant of Marmet ==
- Marmetschke

(Also Sometimes Marmaetzschke or Marmätzchke)

- Marmette

(Francization of Marmet)

- Marmett

(German Variant)

- Marmitt

(Yiddish Variant)
