= Marmette =

Marmette may refer to:

== People ==
- Joseph Marmette (1844–1895), Canadian novelist and historian
- Marie-Louise Marmette (1870–1928), French-Canadian author and lecturer

== Places ==
- Marmette Lake, freshwater body in Canada
