= Claude Lachance =

Canadian politician

Member of the Quebec National Assembly for Bellechasse
- In office 1981–1985
- Preceded by: Bertrand Goulet
- Succeeded by: Louise Bégin
- In office 1994–2003
- Preceded by: Louise Bégin
- Succeeded by: Dominique Vien

Personal details
- Born: October 3, 1945 (age 80) Saint-Nazaire-de-Dorchester, Quebec
- Party: Parti Québécois
- Occupation: Teacher, Mayor

Claude Lachance (born October 3, 1945) is a Canadian politician. He was a three-term Member of the National Assembly of Quebec.

== Early life ==
Claude Lachance was born in the town of Saint-Nazaire-de-Dorchester, Quebec in 1945 to Leopold Lachance, a local mechanic, and Cécile Turgeon. He was educated at local schools in Saint-Nazaire-de-Dorchester before finishing his studies at Collège de Lévis. He later graduated with two degrees from Laval University, becoming a certified secondary school teacher.

Lachance taught at Polyvalente St-Damien from 1970-1974, moving up the ranks to become school board president, and later head of the social studies department and assistant principal, a position he held until 1981.

During this time, he served as a board member of the Lac-Etchemin Health and Social Services Center, later becoming chairman of the board for the organization.

Lachance ran for Mayor of Saint-Nazaire-de-Dorchester from 1973-1981. During this time he also served as Deputy Prefect (1973-1979) and Prefect of Dorchester County, Quebec (1979-1981).

== Member of the National Assembly ==
Claude Lachance was first elected to the National Assembly in the 1981 election, in which the Parti Québécois formed the government. He was defeated, however, four year later in the 1985 election. Following his loss, he returned to municipal politics, being reelected as mayor of Saint-Nazaire-de-Dorchester from 1978-1993. In 1989, Lachance tried to win back his seat in the National Assembly, but was again beaten by Louise Begin.

Lachance also returned to his loves of education and history, returning to the school board and serving as president of the Bellechasse Historical Society from 1986-1987. He served as principal for the primary schools in both St-Damien and St-Nazaire from 1986-1994.

He returned to politics in the 1994 election, and was reelected in the 1998 election. During the 35th Quebec Legislature, Lachance served as Deputy Government Whip. Lachance was again defeated in the 2003 election.

== Later life ==
After his defeat in 2003, Lachance was again elected Mayor of Saint-Nazaire-de-Dorchester, later serving as Deputy Prefect of Bellechasse Regional County Municipality until 2007.
