= Dominique Vien =

Canadian politician

Dominique Vien MP
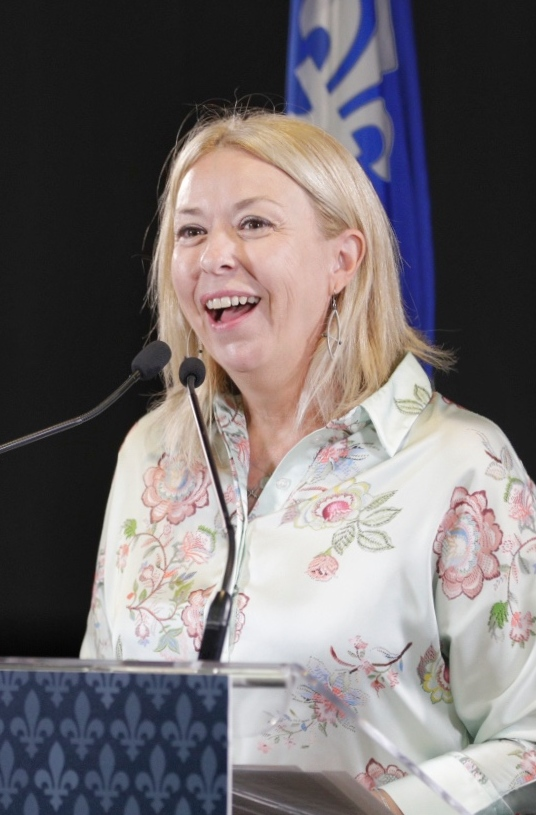

Member of the Canadian Parliament for Bellechasse—Les Etchemins—Lévis
- Incumbent
- Assumed office September 20, 2021
- Preceded by: Steven Blaney

Member of the National Assembly of Quebec for Bellechasse
- In office December 8, 2008 – August 29, 2018
- Preceded by: Jean Domingue
- Succeeded by: Stéphanie Lachance
- In office April 14, 2003 – March 26, 2007
- Preceded by: Claude Lachance
- Succeeded by: Jean Domingue

Personal details
- Born: February 10, 1967 (age 59) Lévis, Quebec, Canada
- Party: Conservative Party of Canada (federal); Quebec Liberal Party (provincial)
- Education: Université Laval; Université du Québec à Trois-Rivières
- Occupation: journalist, radio and TV host

Dominique Vien (born February 10, 1967) is a Canadian politician who has been the MP for Bellechasse—Les Etchemins—Lévis since the 2021 general election. She previous served as a Quebec Liberal Party Member of the National Assembly of Quebec for the electoral district of Bellechasse from 2003 to 2007 and from 2008 to 2014, during which she served in the Quebec provincial cabinet.

== Before politics ==
Born in Lévis, Quebec, Vien studied at Université Laval and received a bachelor's degree in communications in 1992. She also studied at the Université du Québec à Trois-Rivières in training, animation and leadership in 2001.

From 1992 to 2003, she was a journalist, anchor and host at a radio station in Lac-Etchemin and was a journalist and news anchor at Radio-Canada's CBV-FM in Quebec City from 1999 to 2001.

During her brief time out of office between 2007 and 2008, she worked for the Desjardins Group as a communications advisor.

== Political career ==
=== Provincial career ===
Vein stood as the Quebec Liberal Party candidate in the electoral district of Bellechasse in the six Québec provincial general elections between 2003 and 2018.

She was first elected as its Member of the National Assembly (MNA) in the 2003 Quebec provincial election. During her first term, she served as the parliamentary secretary for the Minister of Culture and Communications. She was briefly out of office following her defeat in the 2007 election by Jean Domingue of the Action démocratique du Québec.

Vien was re-elected in the same district in 2008, and held the seat for the following decade until being defeated by Coalition Avenir Québec candidate Stéphanie Lachance in the 2018 election that saw the CAQ forming government for the first time. Immediately following the 2008 election, she was promoted into the cabinet of Jean Charest as Minister for Government Services. She was reassigned to be the Minister Delegate (associate minister) for social services in 2010, serving under Minister of Health and Social Services Yves Bolduc until the defeat of the Charest government in the 2012 election. Upon the Liberals' return to power in 2014 after a brief stint in opposition, Vien joined the cabinet of Philippe Couillard as tourism minister from 2014 to 2016. and as labour minister and the government's deputy house leader from 2016 to 2018.

Vien was defeated in the 2018 election when the Liberals lost more than half of their seats. From 2018 to 2021, she worked as the director general for Les Etchemins Regional County Municipality administration.

=== Member of Parliament ===
Vien was elected as a Conservative Member of Parliament in the House of Commons of Canada for the electoral district of Bellechasse—Les Etchemins—Lévis in the 2021 Canadian federal election.

In the 2022 Conservative leadership contest, Vien was one of several Conservative MPs who issued an open letter to urge former Québec premier Jean Charest to enter the contest. Charest entered the contest but lost to Pierre Poilievre.

In late 2025, to quell speculation that she was among the Conservative MPs considering leaving the party, Vien released a video statement reaffirming her commitment to the party.

== Electoral record ==
=== Federal ===
2025 Canadian federal election: Bellechasse—Les Etchemins—Lévis
Party	Candidate	Votes	%	±%	Expenditures
Conservative	Dominique Vien	32,097	49.08	–2.92	$35,952.98
Liberal	Glenn O'Farrell	18,642	28.51	+12.96	$51,416.72
Bloc Québécois	Gaby Breton	12,244	18.72	–4.04	$10,277.48
New Democratic	Marie-Philippe Gagnon Gauthier	1,621	2.48	–2.44	$24.38
People's	Mario Fréchette	794	1.21	N/A	$2,355.94
Total valid votes/expense limit		65,398	98.39	–	$137,588.31
Total rejected ballots		1,071	1.61		
Turnout		66,469	72.46		
Eligible voters		91,736			
Conservative notional hold		Swing		–7.94	
Source: Elections Canada
Note: number of eligible voters does not include voting day registrations.

2021 Canadian federal election: Bellechasse—Les Etchemins—Lévis
Party	Candidate	Votes	%	±%	Expenditures
Conservative	Dominique Vien	32,259	51.04	+0.94	$27,017.86
Bloc Québécois	Marie-Christine Richard	14,670	23.21	+0.32	$15,804.72
Liberal	Daniel Vaillancourt	10,075	15.94	-0.72	$5,446.69
New Democratic	Marie-Philippe Gagnon Gauthier	3,183	5.04	-0.02	$0.48
Free	Raymond Arcand	1,802	2.85	–	$0.00
Green	Hélène Lefebvre	913	1.44	-1.54	$0.00
Independent	Chamroeun Khuon	306	0.48	–	$915.04
Total valid votes/expense limit		63,208	–	–	$123,757.24
Total rejected ballots					
Turnout			65.62	-3.71	
Registered voters		96,317			
Conservative hold		Swing		+0.31	
Source: Elections Canada

=== Provincial ===
2018 Quebec general election: Bellechasse
Party	Candidate	Votes	%	±%
Coalition Avenir Québec	Stéphanie Lachance	16,302	53.85	+20.67
Liberal	Dominique Vien	8,223	27.16	-22.11
Québec solidaire	Benoit Comeau	2,272	7.5	+4.81
Parti Québécois	Benoît Béchard	2,198	7.26	-6.06
Conservative	Dominique Messner	976	3.22	+2.04
Bloc Pot	Simon Guay	200	0.66	
Alliance provinciale	Sébastien Roy	103	0.34	
Total valid votes		30,274	98.26	
Total rejected ballots		535	1.74	
Turnout		30,809	70.10	
Eligible voters		43,947		
Coalition Avenir Québec gain from Liberal		Swing		+21.39
Source(s) "Rapport des résultats officiels du scrutin". Élections Québec.

2014 Quebec general election
Party	Candidate	Votes	%	±%
Liberal	Dominique Vien	15,843	49.27	+9.41
Coalition Avenir Québec	Stéphanie Lachance	10,668	33.18	-4.78
Parti Québécois	Linda Goupil	4,283	13.32	-1.64
Québec solidaire	Benoit Comeau	378	2.69	-1.87
Conservative	Patrice Aubin	344	1.18	+0.42
Option nationale	Mathilde Lefebvre	116	0.36	–
Total valid votes		32,153	99.03	–
Total rejected ballots		316	0.97	–
Turnout		32,469	75.23	-0.89
Electors on the lists		43,158	–	–
Liberal hold		Swing		+7.10

2012 Quebec general election
Party	Candidate	Votes	%	±%
Liberal	Dominique Vien	13,119	40.67	-4.52
Coalition Avenir Québec	Christian Lévesque	12,421	38.51	+2.31
Parti Québécois	Clément Pouliot	4,896	15.18	-0.81
Québec solidaire	Benoit Comeau	989	3.07	+0.56
Middle Class	Patrice Aubin	344	1.07	–
Conservative	Linda Beaudoin	215	0.67	–
Équipe Autonomiste	Sébastien Ruel	156	0.48	–
Unité Nationale	Christine Lavoie	115	0.36	–
Total valid votes		32,255	98.80	–
Total rejected ballots		393	1.20	–
Turnout		32,648	76.12	+11.77
Electors on the lists		42,892	–	–

^ Change is based on redistributed results. Coalition Avenir change is from Action démocratique.

2008 Quebec general election
Party	Candidate	Votes	%	±%
Liberal	Dominique Vien	10,530	47.66	+13.31
Action démocratique	Jean Domingue	7,598	34.39	-14.12
Parti Québécois	Jerry Beaudoin	3,450	15.61	+2.18
Québec solidaire	Jean-Nicolas Denis	518	2.34	0.59
Total valid votes		22,096	98.71	–
Total rejected ballots		289	1.29	–
Turnout		22,385	64.35	-12.42
Electors on the lists		34,785	–	–

2007 Quebec general election
Party	Candidate	Votes	%	±%
Action démocratique	Jean Domingue	12,715	48.51	+15.40
Liberal	Dominique Vien	9,004	34.35	-3.23
Parti Québécois	Sylvie Vallières	3,521	13.43	-14.14
Green	Ghislain Gaulin	512	1.95	+0.73
Québec solidaire	Colin Perreault	460	1.75	+1.23*
Total valid votes		26,212	99.28	–
Total rejected ballots		191	0.72	–
Turnout		26,403	76.77	+0.67
Electors on the lists		34,391	–	–

2003 Quebec general election
Party	Candidate	Votes	%	±%
Liberal	Dominique Vien	9,658	37.58	-0.84
Action démocratique	Serge Carbonneau	8,507	33.11	+19.88
Parti Québécois	Claude Lachance	7,084	27.57	-20.01
Green	Sylvain Castonguay	314	1.22	–
UFP	Mario Ouellette	134	0.52	–
Total valid votes		25,697	99.12	–
Total rejected ballots		228	0.88	–
Turnout		25,925	76.00	-3.00
Electors on the lists		34,069	–	–

Political offices
Preceded by Monique Jérôme-Forget	Minister of Government Services; 2008–2010	Succeeded by Michelle Courchesne
