= Alphée Poirier =

Alphée Poirier may refer to:

- Alphée Poirier (MP) (1899–1944), member of the Canadian House of Commons
- Alphée Poirier (Quebec MLA) (1905–1978), member of the Legislative Assembly of Quebec
