= Adélard Turgeon =

Canadian lawyer and politician

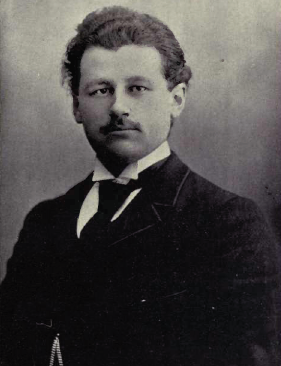

Member of the Legislative Council of Quebec for De la Vallière
- In office 1909–1930
- Preceded by: François-Xavier-Ovide Méthot
- Succeeded by: Joseph-Charles-Ernest Ouellet

Member of the Legislative Assembly of Quebec for Bellechasse
- In office 1890–1909
- Preceded by: Faucher de Saint-Maurice
- Succeeded by: Antonin Galipeault

Personal details
- Born: December 18, 1863 Saint-Étienne-de-Beaumont (Beaumont), Canada East (now Quebec)
- Died: November 14, 1930 (aged 66) Saint-Étienne-de-Beaumont, Quebec, Canada
- Party: Quebec Liberal Party

Adélard Turgeon, CMG CVO KC (December 18, 1863 – November 14, 1930) was a Canadian lawyer and politician.

Born in Saint-Étienne-de-Beaumont (Beaumont), Canada East, Turgeon attended the Collège de Lévis before receiving a Bachelor of Laws degree from Université Laval at Quebec. He was called to the Quebec Bar in 1887 and started a law career. He was created a King's Counsel in 1903.

He was elected to the Legislative Assembly of Quebec in the 1890 election for Bellechasse. A Liberal, he was re-elected in 1892 and 1897. In 1897, he was appointed commissioner of colonization and mines in the cabinet of Félix-Gabriel Marchand and continued the position in the cabinet of Simon-Napoléon Parent. He was acclaimed in 1900 and 1904. In 1902, he was appointed minister of agriculture. In 1905, he was appointed minister of lands, mines, and fisheries and then minister of lands and forests. In 1909, he was appointed to the Legislative Council of Quebec representing the division of La Vallière and served as Speaker. He served until his death in 1930.

He was made an Officer of the Order of Léopold in 1904, Knight of the Légion d'honneur in 1904 (and Officer in 1928), Companion of the Order of St Michael and St George in 1906, and Commander of the Royal Victorian Order in 1908.
