= Valmore Bienvenue =

Canadian politician (1894–1952)

Valmore Bienvenue KC
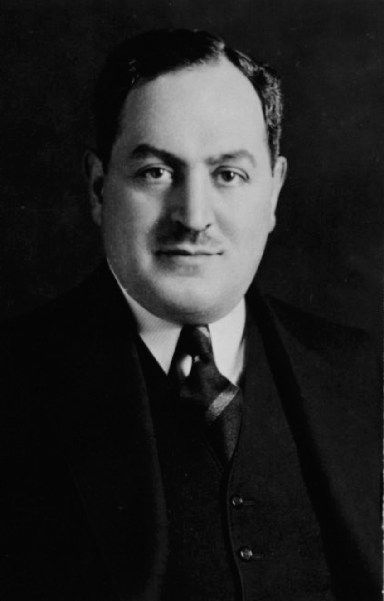

Member of the Legislative Assembly of Quebec for Bellechasse
- In office 1939–1948
- Preceded by: Émile Boiteau
- Succeeded by: Paul-Eugène Belanger

23rd President of the National Assembly of Quebec
- In office 1942–1943
- Preceded by: Bernard Bissonnette
- Succeeded by: Cyrille Dumaine

Personal details
- Born: July 12, 1894 Nashua, New Hampshire
- Died: February 19, 1952 (aged 57) Hull, Quebec
- Party: Liberal

Valmore Bienvenue KC (French pronunciation: [valmɔʁ bjɛ̃vny]; July 12, 1894 – February 19, 1952) was a lawyer and political figure in Quebec. He represented Bellechasse in the Legislative Assembly of Quebec from 1939 to 1948 as a Liberal. Bienvenue was Speaker of the Legislative Assembly in 1942.

He was born in Nashua, New Hampshire, the son of Hormisdas Bienvenue and Angéline Beaupré. Bienvenue was educated at the Collège Sacré-Coeur in Saint-Hyacinthe, at the Séminaire Saint-Charles Borromée and the Université Laval. He was called to the Quebec bar in 1917 and set up practice in Quebec City. Bienvenue practised in partnership with Élisée Thériault, Oscar Drouin, Henri-Paul Drouin and Jean Lesage. He was named King's Counsel in 1927. Bienvenue served in the provincial cabinet as Minister of Hunting and Fishing from 1942 to 1944. He was defeated when he ran for reelection in 1948. He served as judge in the Quebec Superior Court for Quebec district from 1950 to 1952.

Bienvenue was married twice: first to Eugénie Masse and then, in 1925, to Charlotte Langlois. He died in Hull at the age of 57 and was buried in the Cimetière Notre-Dame-de-Belmont at Sainte-Foy.

His son Jean Bienvenue also served in the Quebec assembly.
