= Onésime Pelletier =

Canadian politician

Member of the Legislative Assembly of Quebec for Bellechasse
- In office 1867–1875
- Succeeded by: Pierre Fradet

Personal details
- Born: April 5, 1833 Lavaltrie, Lower Canada
- Died: April 2, 1881 (aged 47) Saint-Charles, Quebec
- Party: Liberal

Onésime Pelletier (April 5, 1833 – April 2, 1881) was a medical doctor and political figure in Quebec. He represented Bellechasse in the Legislative Assembly of Quebec from 1867 to 1875 as a Liberal member.

He was born in Lavaltrie, Lower Canada, the son of Ambroise Pelletier and Louise-Sophie Giguère, and was educated at the Collège de l'Assomption and the Université Laval. He qualified to practice as a doctor in 1858 and set up practice in Saint-Charles. In 1859, he married Anselmie Blais. Pelletier was president of the Bellechasse Colonization Society. He was defeated by Pierre Fradet when he ran for reelection in 1875. Pelletier died in Saint-Charles at the age of 47.
