= Antonin Galipeault =

Canadian politician

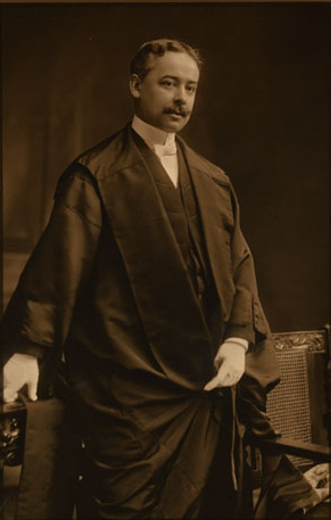

Member of the Legislative Assembly of Quebec for Bellechasse
- In office 1909–1930
- Preceded by: Adélard Turgeon
- Succeeded by: Robert Taschereau

Personal details
- Born: August 7, 1879 Maskinongé, Quebec
- Died: May 12, 1971 (aged 91) Quebec City, Quebec

Antonin Galipeault (French pronunciation: [ɑ̃tɔnɛ̃ ɡalipo]; August 7, 1879 – May 12, 1971) was a Québécois politician, lawyer and judge.

== Biography ==
Antonin Galipeault studied at a seminary in Joliette and at Université Laval, later being admitted to the Bar of Quebec in 1900.

He worked as a lawyer alongside Joseph-Napoléon Francoeur and Louis Saint-Laurent, and later became president of the Saint-Jean-Baptiste Society. After a first tentative role as provincial deputy in 1904, he became municipal councillor for Quebec City.

He was elected deputy of Bellechasse in 1909, and was re-elected in 1912, 1916, 1919, 1923 and 1927. He was notably President of the National Assembly of Quebec from 1916 to 1919 and minister of public works under Louis-Alexandre Taschereau.

He left political life in 1930 to become chief judge of the Court of King's Bench. While the post of Lieutenant Governor of Quebec was vacant between 1950 and 1953, he administered the province of Quebec.

He retired in 1963, and died in Quebec City on May 12, 1971. Two bridges were named after him: a major autoroute bridge in Sainte-Anne-de-Bellevue, and a covered bridge in Grande-Vallée. He received an honorary doctorate from Laval University in 1925.

== See also ==
- Bellechasse (provincial electoral district)
- Parti libéral du Québec
- President of the National Assembly of Quebec
