= Pierre Fradet =

Canadian politician

Member of the Legislative Assembly of Quebec for Bellechasse
- In office 1875–1878
- Preceded by: Onésime Pelletier
- Succeeded by: Pierre Boutin

Personal details
- Born: September 20, 1833 Saints-Gervais-et-Protais, Lower Canada
- Died: June 27, 1910 (aged 76) Quebec City, Quebec
- Party: Conservative

Pierre Fradet (September 20, 1833 – June 27, 1910) was a carpenter and political figure in Quebec. He represented Bellechasse in the Legislative Assembly of Quebec from 1875 to 1878 as a Conservative.

He was born in Saints-Gervais-et-Protais, Bellechasse County, Lower Canada, the son of Ambroise Fradet and Angèle Gonthier. In 1856, he married Louise Lachance. Fradet was defeated by Pierre Boutin when he ran for reelection in 1878. He died at Quebec City at the age of 76 and was buried in Sainte-Foy.
