= Jean-Baptiste-Alphonse =

Jean-Baptiste-Alphonse is a given name. Notable people with the name include:

- Jean-Baptiste Alphonse Karr (1808-1890), French critic, journalist and novelist
- Jean-Baptiste-Alphonse Lusignan (1843-1893), French-Canadian writer

== See also ==
- Alphonse (disambiguation)
