= Prosper Bender =

Canadian-American literary figure

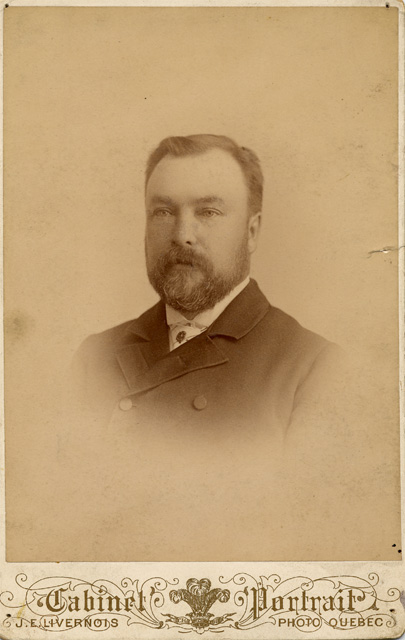
Louis-Prosper Bender (ca. 1880)

Prosper Bender (July 30, 1844 – January 24, 1917) was a homeopathic physician, a writer, and a proponent of the American annexation of Canada. His home was a center of literary activity in Quebec City in the 1870s. After the publication of two books, Bender moved to Boston, where he became an outspoken critic of Conservative governments in Canada. He also wrote about French-Canadian culture for American audiences. He lived and practiced medicine in Boston for over twenty-five years before repatriating to Quebec City.

== Early life ==
Louis-Prosper Bender was born to attorney Louis-Prosper Bender (Sr.) and Mary Ann Jane McMillan on July 30, 1844. His father was of mixed German, British, and French descent; his mother was an Irish immigrant. Bender grew up in a middle-class household. A sister would later marry the son of Canadian premier Étienne-Paschal Taché.

Bender attended the Petit Séminaire in Quebec City and medical school in Montreal. Too young to be admitted to the medical profession in Lower Canada, he served as an army surgeon with Union forces in the final years of the American Civil War. Returning to Canada, he received his license. The Canadian Medical Association would expel him several years later due to his embrace of homeopathic treatments.

Bender married Aurélie Esther Scott, daughter of attorney Alexander Stewart Scott and Catherine Suzanne Frémont, in 1868.

== Quebec City ==
In Quebec City, Bender lived on D'Aiguillon Street, where, each week, he welcomed an eclectic and expanding group of writers and political leaders. Bender cultivated a space where literary matters were freely discussed. Regular visitors included Joseph Marmette, Faucher de Saint-Maurice, Hubert LaRue, Oscar Dunn, Buteau Turcotte, and William Blumhart. Honoré Mercier and Joseph-Adolphe Chapleau, both future premiers of Quebec, also visited. Marmette was then at the height of his fame; Faucher was becoming well known and would soon take a seat at the Legislative Assembly; Dunn had made his name as a columnist and an editor. This group became known varyingly as "la société d'admiration mutuelle," "le cénacle de la rue d'Aiguillon," and "la pléiade de Saint-Maurice." Historians of literature have recognized the group that gathered around Bender as an expression of the literary ferment occurring in Quebec City in the 1870s. Its ability to bring together individuals with strong personalities and diverging political views speaks to the strength and appeal of Bender's circle.

This cultural hub, perhaps the first real salon since the days of the Crémazie bookstore, eventually inspired Bender to pen two works of his own, both in English. His Literary Sheaves, Or, La Littérature au Canada Français: The Drama, History, Romance, Poetry, Lectures, Sketches, &c. appeared in 1881. It traced recent developments in French-Canadian literature and helped promote the works of friends and associates. Bender published Old and New Canada, 1753-1844: Historic Scenes and Social pictures; Or, The Life of Joseph-Francois Perrault, partly a biography of his great-grandfather, the following year. His works were noted in the press and distributed as prizes for public school students.

== Boston ==
In the fall of 1882, perhaps due to professional disappointments, Bender suddenly moved to Boston. A farewell dinner given in his honor in Quebec City and attended by legislators, ministers, and many literary figure reflected the influence he had developed and his large cultural network. Although he visited his home province from time to time and received Canadian friends in Boston, he remained in the United States for more than twenty-five years. He embraced the cause of annexationism, believing that Canada would fare better economically and politically if absorbed by the United States. He published on Canadian themes, including at least ten articles in the Magazine of American History that appeared in the 1880s and early 1890s. His work also appeared in the North American Review and the New England Magazine.

Bender repeatedly panned the corruption, national divisions, mismanagement, and sluggish economy that plagued Canada. He was thus a vociferous critic of Confederation and one of the most prominent Canadian proponents of annexation. As he embraced new themes in his writing—during the mass migration from Quebec, he helped educate American readers about French-Canadian culture—he shied away from his political cause, which received little popular support and even less official encouragement. According to one historian, unlike more intransigent supporters of annexation, Bender's views ebbed and flowed with changing conditions in Canada and, as such, he was a "bellwether" of Canadian national development.

== Final Years ==
In 1907, following the death of his old friend William Blumhart, he began contributing reflections on bygone days to the Quebec Daily Telegraph; these contributions continued for years. His recollections developed in a nostalgic style that shed light on the city's social, cultural, and political life in the 1870s and 1880s.

Bender returned to Quebec City in 1908 and continued to practice medicine. He died in Quebec City in 1917. His body was interred in Notre-Dame-de-Belmont Cemetery.

== Bibliography ==
- "Bender, Louis-Prosper," Répertoire du patrimoine culturel du Québec, https://www.patrimoine-culturel.gouv.qc.ca/rpcq/detail.do?methode=consulter&id=16192&type=pge.
- Bender, Prosper (1881). Literary Sheaves, Or, La Littérature au Canada Français: The Drama, History, Romance, Poetry, Lectures, Sketches, &c. Montreal: Dawson Brothers.
- Bender, Prosper (1882). Old and New Canada, 1753-1844: Historic Scenes and Social pictures; Or, The Life of Joseph-Francois Perrault. Montreal: Dawson Brothers.
- Bienville, Louyse de (1931). Figures et paysages. Montreal: Beauchemin.
- Dreith, Ben (2020). "The Obscure Champion of Francophone Writing Who Called for Canada to Join the U.S.," NUVO, https://nuvomagazine.com/daily-edit/prosper-bender.
- Faucher de Saint-Maurice, N. H. E. (1887). "Vers le passé—Chez le docteur Bender." Nouvelles soirées canadiennes, vol. 6, 548-553.
- Lacroix, Patrick (2018). "Prosper Bender's American Dream," Query the Past, https://querythepast.com/prosper-bender-american-dream/.
- Lacroix, Patrick (2018). "Seeking an 'Entente Cordiale': Prosper Bender, French Canada, and Intercultural Brokership in the Nineteenth Century," Journal of Canadian Studies, vol. 52, no. 2, 381-403.
