= Pierre Boutin =

Canadian politician

Member of the Legislative Assembly of Quebec for Bellechasse
- In office 1878–1881
- Preceded by: Pierre Fradet
- Succeeded by: Faucher de Saint-Maurice

Personal details
- Born: December 26, 1821 Saint-Henri, Lower Canada
- Died: December 3, 1901 (aged 79) Beauport, Quebec
- Party: Liberal

Pierre Boutin (December 26, 1821 – December 3, 1901) was a farmer and political figure in Quebec. He represented Bellechasse in the Legislative Assembly of Quebec from 1878 to 1881 as a Liberal.

He was born in Saint-Henri, Lower Canada, the son of Pierre Boutin and Rose Morisset, and was educated there. Boutin also served as justice of the peace at Saint-Raphaël. In 1848, he married Esther Bernard. Boutin was an unsuccessful candidate in Bellechasse in an 1875 federal by-election. He was elected to the Quebec assembly in 1878, defeating the incumbent Pierre Fradet, but was defeated by Narcisse-Henri-Édouard Faucher de Saint-Maurice when he ran for reelection in 1881. Boutin died at Beauport at the age of 79 and was buried in Saint-Raphaël.
