= Jean Domingue =

Canadian politician (born 1962)

MNA for Bellechasse
- In office April 25, 2007 – November 5, 2008
- Preceded by: Dominique Vien
- Succeeded by: Dominique Vien

Personal details
- Born: September 26, 1962 (age 64) Montreal, Quebec, Canada
- Party: Conservative Party of Quebec
- Other political affiliations: Coalition Avenir Québec (2011–2022); Action démocratique du Québec (2003–2011)
- Profession: Youth educator

Jean Domingue (born September 26, 1962) is a politician from Quebec, Canada. He was an Action démocratique du Québec (ADQ) Member of the National Assembly for the electoral district of Bellechasse from 2007 to 2008.

Domingue was born in Montreal, Quebec. He joined the ADQ in 2003.

Domingue was first elected in the 2007 election with 49% of the vote. Liberal incumbent Dominique Vien finished second with 34% of the vote. Domingue took office on April 12, 2007.

Prior to his political career, Domingue worked as an educator at a youth centre in Quebec City and was also the general manager of a youth house in the same region. He also occupied several positions at various youth development-related community organizations and associations.

== Electoral record ==
2022 Quebec general election: Charlesbourg
Party	Candidate	Votes	%	±%
Coalition Avenir Québec	Jonatan Julien	18,921	45.00	–3.13
Conservative	Jean Domingue	8,564	20.37	+16.69
Parti Québécois	Priscilla Corbeil	5,967	14.19	+2.47
Québec solidaire	Ève Duhaime	5,486	13.05	–0.47
Liberal	Mahamadou Sissoko	2,518	5.99	–16.45
Green	Odevie Essaidi	348	0.83	New
Parti 51	David Cantin	163	0.39	New
Démocratie directe	Daniel Pelletier	75	0.18	New
Total valid votes		42,042	98.66	
Total rejected ballots		570	1.34	–0.60
Turnout		42,612	74.60	+1.23
Electors on the lists		57,117		
Coalition Avenir Québec hold		Swing		–9.91
Source: Élections Québec

2008 Quebec general election
Party	Candidate	Votes	%	±%
Liberal	Dominique Vien	10,530	47.66	+13.31
Action démocratique	Jean Domingue	7,598	34.39	-14.12
Parti Québécois	Jerry Beaudoin	3,450	15.61	+2.18
Québec solidaire	Jean-Nicolas Denis	518	2.34	0.59
Total valid votes		22,096	98.71	–
Total rejected ballots		289	1.29	–
Turnout		22,385	64.35	-12.42
Electors on the lists		34,785	–	–

2007 Quebec general election
Party	Candidate	Votes	%	±%
Action démocratique	Jean Domingue	12,715	48.51	+15.40
Liberal	Dominique Vien	9,004	34.35	-3.23
Parti Québécois	Sylvie Vallières	3,521	13.43	-14.14
Green	Ghislain Gaulin	512	1.95	+0.73
Québec solidaire	Colin Perreault	460	1.75	+1.23*
Total valid votes		26,212	99.28	–
Total rejected ballots		191	0.72	–
Turnout		26,403	76.77	+0.67
Electors on the lists		34,391	–	–
