= Faucher de Saint-Maurice =

Canadian politician

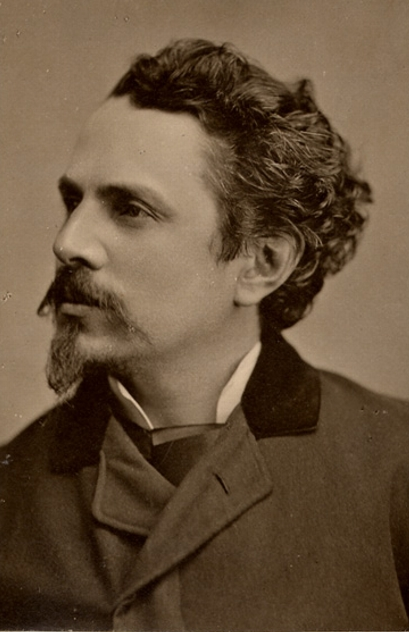
- Born: Narcisse-Henri-Édouard Faucher; April 18, 1844; Quebec City, Canada East
- Died: April 1, 1897 (aged 52); Quebec City, Quebec
- Writing career
- Pen name: Faucher de Saint-Maurice

Narcisse Henri Édouard Faucher (April 18, 1844 – April 1, 1897) was a Canadian author, journalist, army officer, and politician who published books under the name Faucher de Saint-Maurice.

== Life ==
Faucher was born in Quebec. His father, Narcisse-Constantin Faucher, was a lawyer and the seigneur of Beaumont, Vincennes, and of Montapeine. His mother was Catherine-Henriette Marcier. He was educated at the Séminaire de Québec and at the Collège de Sainte-Anne-de-la-Pocatière.

In 1864, he joined the conflict in Mexico and became a captain in the 4th Mexican sharpshooters. Afterward, he was aide-de-camp to General the Viscount Courtois Roussel d'Hurbal. He served through the war, being in 11 battles, 32 minor engagements, and at the sieges of Oaxaca and Satillo; at the latter, he was made prisoner and sentenced to be shot, but was, instead, exchanged. While in Mexico, he met Honoré Beaugrand.

He returned to Canada in 1866, and was for the next fourteen years a clerk of the legislative council of the province of Quebec. In 1874 he began putting more effort into his writing. In the 1870s, he was a member of an informal literary group known varyingly as "la société d'admiration mutuelle," "le cénacle de la rue d'Aiguillon," and "la pléiade de Saint-Maurice." This group gathered regularly at the home of Prosper Bender in Quebec City. The salon's conversations nourished the creative works of Faucher but also of Joseph Marmette and Oscar Dunn. Some of this literary output would be captured in a work published by Bender in 1881. Faucher would later reminisce fondly about these years.

In 1881, Faucher was elected a representative for Bellechasse to the Quebec legislative assembly as a Conservative; he was reelected in 1886 but defeated in 1890.

Faucher de Saint-Maurice

Member of the Legislative Assembly of Quebec for Bellechasse
- In office 1881–1890
- Preceded by: Pierre Boutin
- Succeeded by: Adélard Turgeon

Personal details
- Party: Conservative

He was a commissioner in 1881 from the province of Quebec at the third Geographical Congress and Exhibition in Venice, and while in Europe was created a chevalier of the Legion of Honor for services rendered to France in the Canadian press. He also had been created a knight of the Imperial order of Guadaloupe by Maximilian, and received the medal of the Mexican campaign from Napoleon III.

He was editor of Le journal de Québec (1883-5) then wrote for Le Canadien (1885-6). He contributed largely to the newspaper press in France, Canada, and the United States.

He died at Quebec City at the age of 52.

== Works ==
- De Québec à Mexico (1874)
- À la Brunante (1874)
- Choses et autres (1874)
- De Tribord à bâbord (1877)
- À la Veillée (1877)
- Deux ans au Mexique (1878)
- Relation de ce qui s'est passé lors des fouilles faites par ordre du gouvernement dans une partie des fondations du Collège des jésuites de Québec (1879)
- L'abbé C.-H. Laverdière.
- Les Îles: Promenades dans le golfe Saint-Laurent (1886?)
- En route; sept jours dans les provinces Maritimes (1888)
- Loin du pays, souvenirs d'Europe, d'Afrique et d'Amérique (1889)
- La question du jour: resterons-nous français? (1890)
