= 45th Quebec general election =

Canadian provincial election

- On or before October 7, 2030

127 seats in the National Assembly of Quebec 64 seats needed for a majority
- Opinion polls
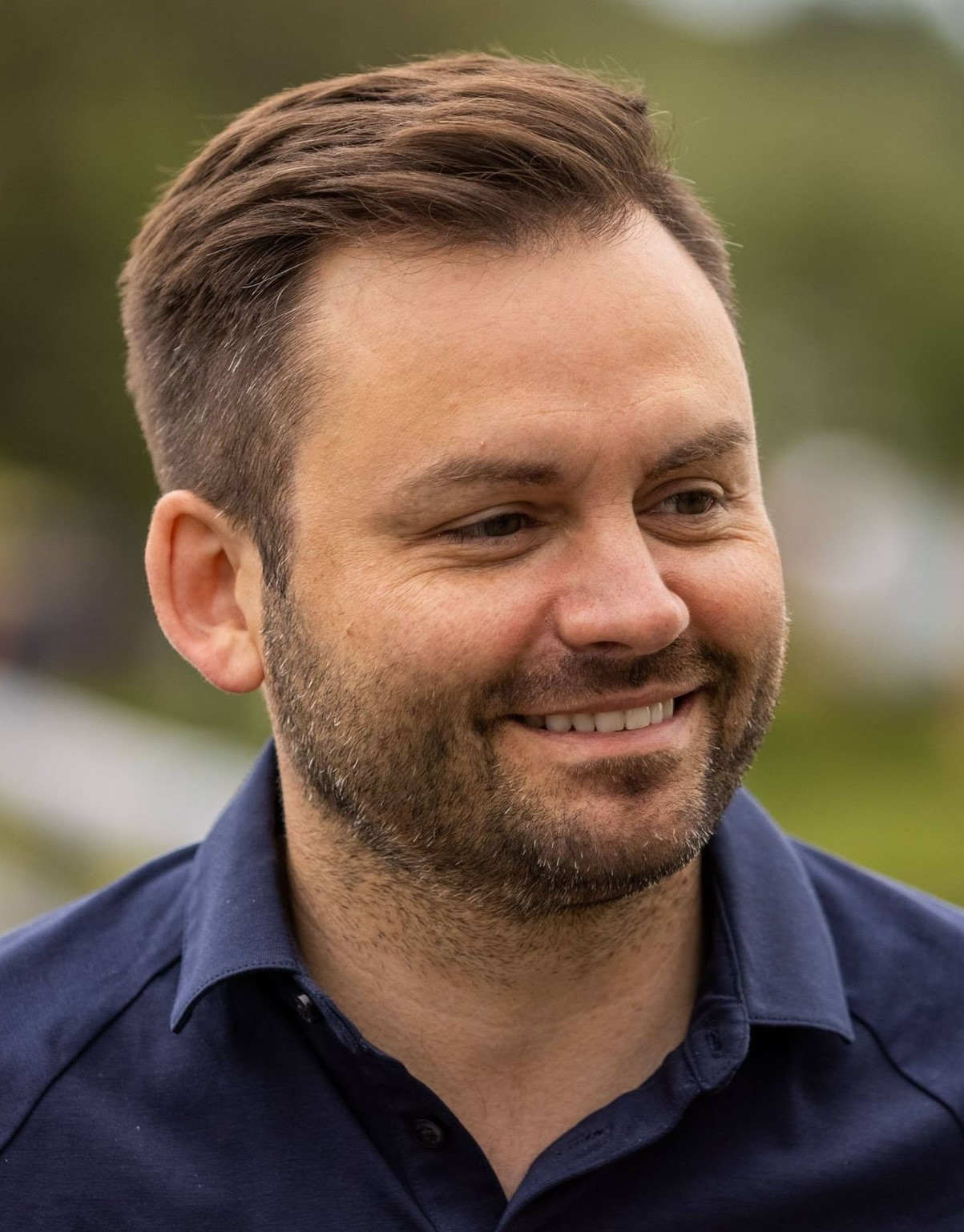

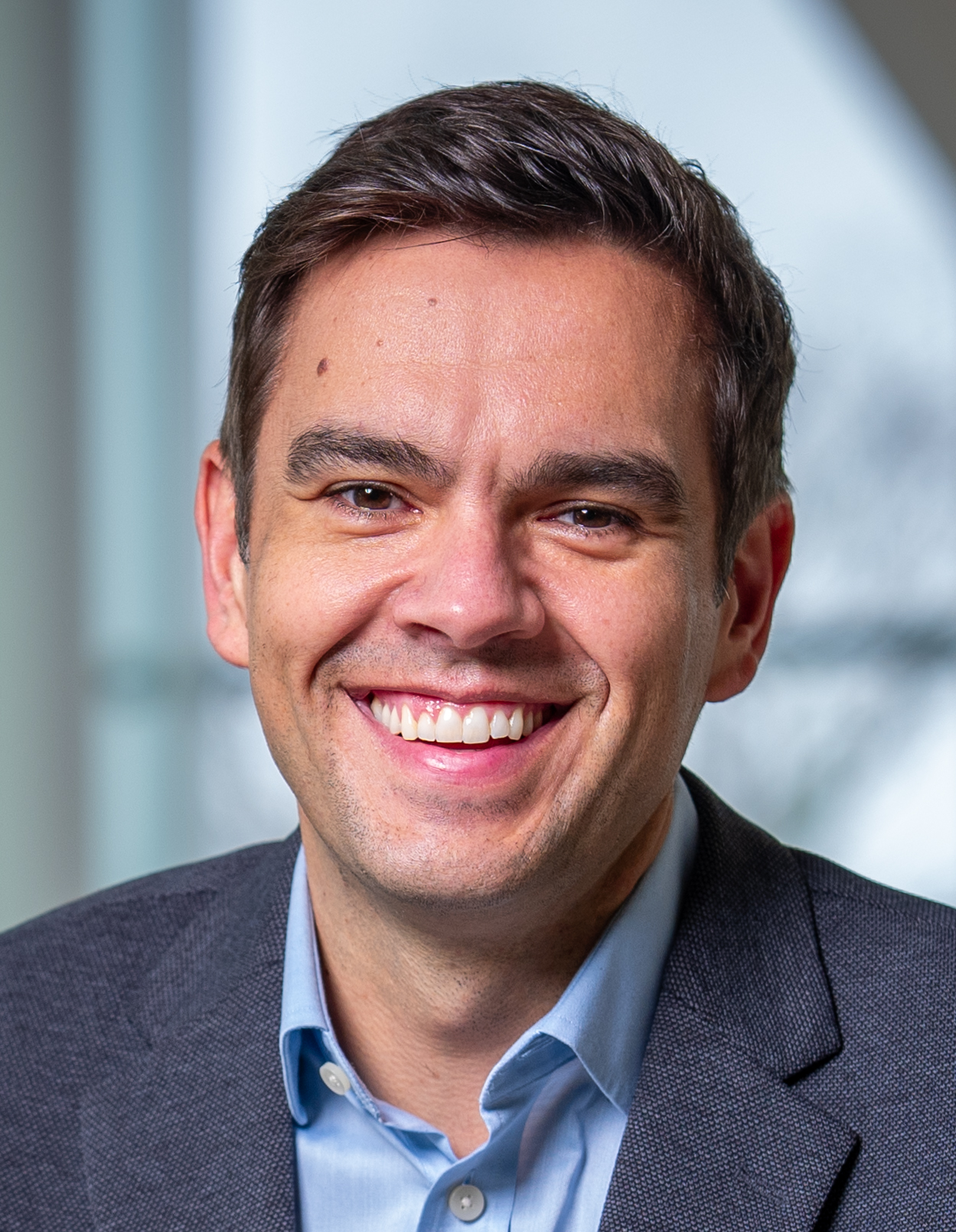

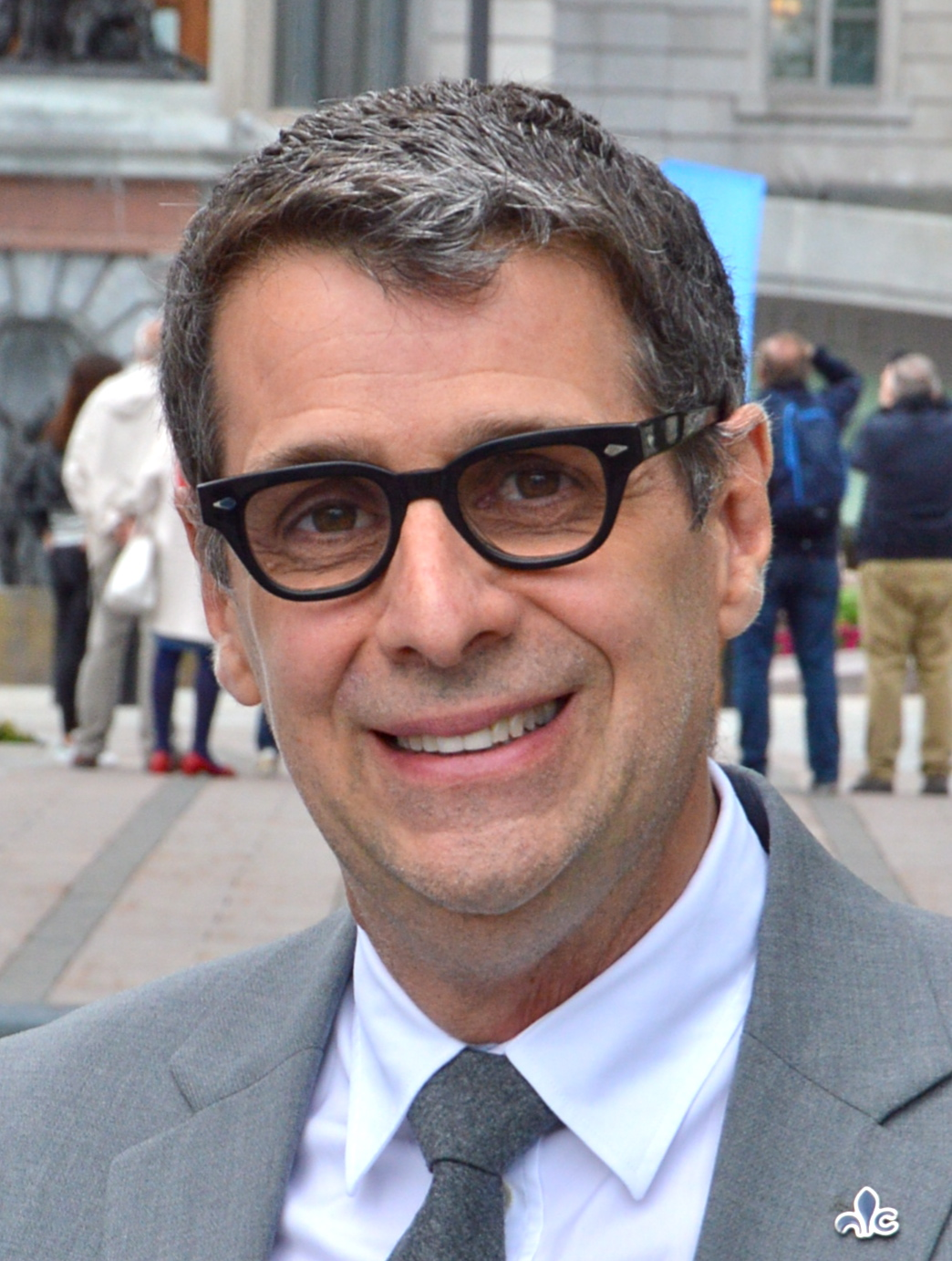

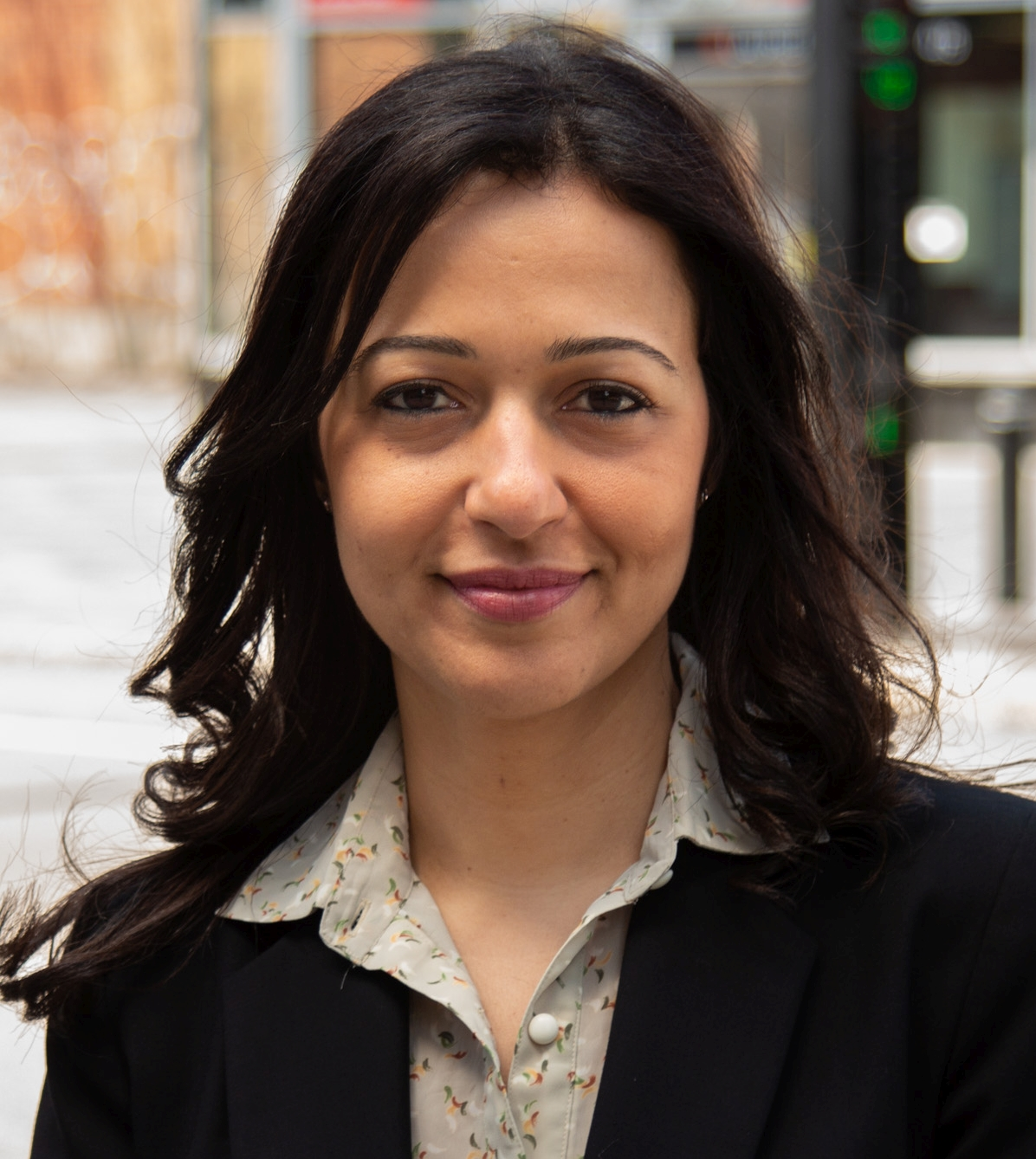

Leader	Paul St-Pierre Plamondon	Charles Milliard	Éric Duhaime
Party	Parti Québécois	Liberal	Conservative
Leader since	October 9, 2020	February 13, 2026	April 17, 2021
Leader's seat	Camille-Laurin	Orford	Bellechasse
Last election	60 seats, 28.02%	39 seats, 24.23%	19 seats, 20.66%
Current seats	60	39	19
Seats needed	▲4	▲25	▲45
Leader	Ruba Ghazal & Sol Zanetti (Note: Québec solidaire designates one female and one male as co-spokespeople. Ghazal is serving with co-spokesperson Zanetti. The party's power is held by the general meetings of the members and a board of 16 directors; the de jure leader recognized by the Chief Electoral Officer of Quebec (DGE) is Carmen Palardy.)	Mathieu Lévesque (interim)
Party	Québec solidaire	Coalition Avenir Québec
Leader since	November 16, 2024 / November 8, 2025	October 18, 2026
Leader's seat	Mercier / Jean-Lesage	None
Last election	9 seats, 12.42%	0 seats, 13.35%
Current seats	9	0
Seats needed	▲55	▲64
Incumbent Premier
Paul St-Pierre Plamondon
Parti Québécois

The 45th Quebec general election will elect members to the National Assembly of the 45th Quebec Legistlature. Pursuant to Section 129 of the Election Act, it is tentatively scheduled for October 7, 2030, but may be called earlier.

On October 6, 2026, the day after the previous general election, Coalition Avenir Québec leader and incumbent Premier of Quebec Christine Fréchette resigned as leader of the CAQ, after the party had a complete electoral wipeout.

== Opinion polls ==
Timeline of opinion polls
Polling organisation	Last date of polling	Source	Sample size	MoE	PQ	Liberal	PCQ	QS	CAQ	Other	Lead
Synopsis	November 16, 2026	HTML	1,000	3,1%	31	31	19	12	5	2	0
Léger	November 16, 2026	PDF	1,013	3,08%	33	31	18	11	6	2	2
Pallas	November 7, 2026	PDF	1,094	3,0%	31	28	21	13	5	2	3
Léger	October 12, 2026	PDF	1,014	3,1%	30	26	22	12	8	2	4
2026 election	October 5, 2026		4,347,703		28.0	24.2	20.7	12.4	13.3	1.2	3.8
