= Bertrand Goulet =

Canadian politician

Member of the National Assembly of Quebec for Bellechasse
- In office 1976–1981
- Preceded by: Pierre Mercier
- Succeeded by: Claude Lachance

Personal details
- Born: November 20, 1944 (age 81) Saint-Gervais de Bellechasse, Quebec
- Party: Conservative
- Other political affiliations: Union Nationale

Bertrand Goulet (born November 20, 1944) is a retired politician from Quebec, Canada.

== Background ==
He was born on November 20, 1944, in Saint-Gervais, Chaudière-Appalaches.

== Political career ==
Goulet was elected as a Union Nationale candidate to the provincial legislature in the district of Bellechasse in the 1976 election against Liberal incumbent Pierre Mercier. He served as his party's House Whip in 1980 and 1981. He finished a close third and lost in the 1981 election against Parti Québécois candidate Claude Lachance.
