= Pierre Mercier (politician) =

Canadian politician (1937–2020)

Member of the National Assembly of Quebec for Bellechasse
- In office 29 October 1973 – 15 November 1976
- Preceded by: Gabriel Loubier
- Succeeded by: Bertrand Goulet

Personal details
- Born: 2 March 1937 Montmagny, Quebec, Canada
- Died: 13 November 2020 (aged 83) Quebec City, Quebec, Canada
- Party: Liberal

Pierre Mercier (2 March 1937 – 13 November 2020) was a Canadian politician.
