= Édifice Jean-Antoine-Panet =

Quebec Government building, Canada

Coordinates: 46.8089°N 71.2159°W

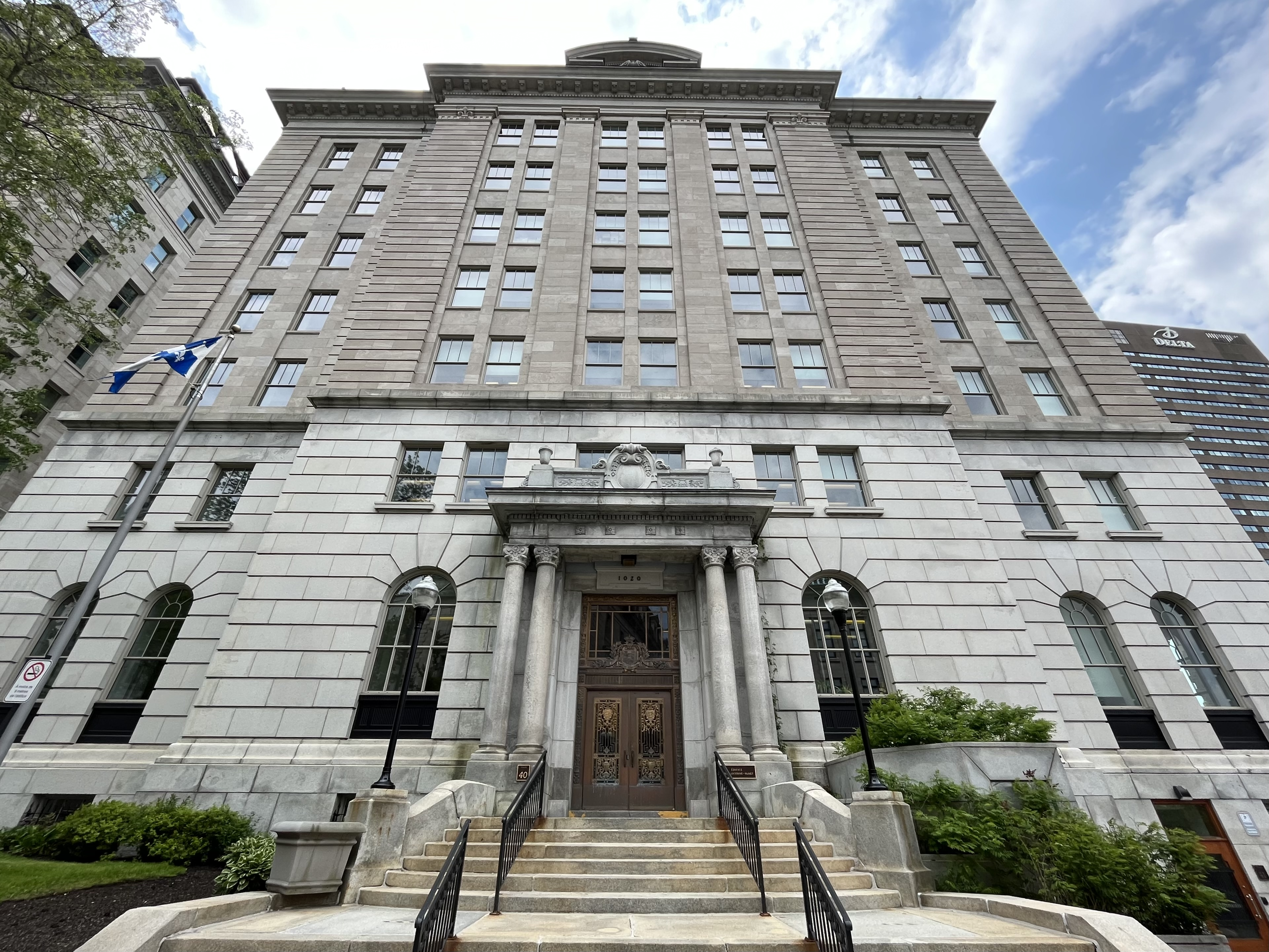
Exterior view, June 2023

Édifice Jean-Antoine-Panet (French pronunciation: [edifis ʒɑ̃ ɑ̃twan panɛ]) is an 8 floor office tower built in 1931, located in Quebec City, Quebec and is part of the complex of buildings of the Government of Quebec. The Beaux-Arts building was designed by architects Lorenzo Auger, Oscar Beaulé and Raoul Chênevert.

It was named in honour of the first speaker of the Legislative Assembly of Lower Canada, Jean-Antoine Panet. It originally housed the Quebec Ministry of Agriculture and since 1985 used as office space by the Quebec National Assembly.
