= Alphée Poirier (Quebec MLA) =

Canadian politician

Member of the National Assembly of Quebec for Bellechasse
- In office 1952–1960
- Preceded by: Paul-Eugène Bélanger
- Succeeded by: Gustave Plante

Personal details
- Born: August 20, 1905 Rimouski, Quebec
- Died: August 9, 1978 (aged 72) Vanier, Quebec
- Party: Union Nationale

Alphée Poirier (August 20, 1905 – August 9, 1978) was a Quebec politician who served in the Legislative Assembly of Quebec from 1952 to 1960.

He was born in Rimouski, Quebec. He studied medicine at the Université Laval and graduated in 1938.

He won the seat of Bellechasse for the Union nationale in the 1952 Quebec general election, and was re-elected in 1956. He was defeated in the 1960 election.
