= Jean Bienvenue =

Canadian politician (1928–2018)

Minister of Education of Quebec
- In office 20 January 1976 – 26 November 1976
- Prime Minister: Robert Bourassa
- Preceded by: Raymond Garneau
- Succeeded by: Jacques-Yvan Morin

Minister of Immigration, Diversity and Inclusion of Quebec
- In office 15 February 1972 – 20 January 1976
- Prime Minister: Robert Bourassa
- Preceded by: François Cloutier
- Succeeded by: Lise Bacon

Personal details
- Born: 24 June 1928
- Died: 13 October 2018 (aged 90)
- Party: Quebec Liberal Party
- Parent: Valmore Bienvenue (father)

Jean Bienvenue (French pronunciation: [ʒɑ̃ bjɛ̃v(ə)ny]; 24 June 1928 – 13 October 2018) was a Liberal minister under Robert Bourassa in the province of Quebec.

He was born in June 1928. Bienvenue graduated from Université Laval before he joined the Quebec bar in June 1952. He was later a member of several law firms. He was the son of Valmore Bienvenue, a lawyer and political figure, and Charlotte Langlois.

Bienvenue was elected an MNA in both 1966 and 1970 in Matane riding. When the Liberals formed the government in 1970, he was appointed deputy government House Leader from January 1971 to November 1976. Bienvenue became Minister of State in May 1971, and then Minister of Immigration in February 1972.

In 1973 he defeated Jacques Parizeau in the Montreal riding of Crémazie.

He died in 2018 at age 90 in Quebec City.
