= Stéphanie Lachance =

Canadian politician

Member of the National Assembly of Quebec for Bellechasse
- In office October 1, 2018 – October 5, 2026
- Preceded by: Dominique Vien
- Succeeded by: Éric Duhaime

Personal details
- Party: Coalition Avenir Québec
- Education: Université Laval

Stéphanie Lachance (French pronunciation: [stefani laʃɑ̃s]) is a Canadian politician who served as a member of the National Assembly of Quebec representing the electoral district of Bellechasse from 2018 to 2026. She is a member of the Coalition Avenir Québec (CAQ).

== Electoral history ==
2022 Quebec general election: Bellechasse
Party	Candidate	Votes	%	±%
Coalition Avenir Québec	Stéphanie Lachance	15,065	45.74	–8.11
Conservative	Michel Tardif	11,612	35.26	+32.04
Parti Québécois	Jean-Daniel Fontaine	2,908	8.83	+1.57
Québec solidaire	Jérôme D'Auteuil Sirois	1,988	6.04	–1.46
Liberal	François Bégin	1,360	4.13	–23.03
Total valid votes		32,933	98.51	+0.25
Total rejected ballots		497	1.49	–0.25
Turnout		33,430	73.86	+3.76
Electors on the lists		45,261	–	–

2018 Quebec general election: Bellechasse
Party	Candidate	Votes	%	±%
Coalition Avenir Québec	Stéphanie Lachance	16,302	53.85	+20.67
Liberal	Dominique Vien	8,223	27.16	-22.11
Québec solidaire	Benoit Comeau	2,272	7.5	+4.81
Parti Québécois	Benoît Béchard	2,198	7.26	-6.06
Conservative	Dominique Messner	976	3.22	+2.04
Bloc Pot	Simon Guay	200	0.66	
Alliance provinciale	Sébastien Roy	103	0.34	
Total valid votes		30,274	98.26	
Total rejected ballots		535	1.74	
Turnout		30,809	70.10	
Eligible voters		43,947		
Coalition Avenir Québec gain from Liberal		Swing		+21.39
Source(s) "Rapport des résultats officiels du scrutin". Élections Québec.

2014 Quebec general election
Party	Candidate	Votes	%	±%
Liberal	Dominique Vien	15,843	49.27	+9.41
Coalition Avenir Québec	Stéphanie Lachance	10,668	33.18	-4.78
Parti Québécois	Linda Goupil	4,283	13.32	-1.64
Québec solidaire	Benoit Comeau	378	2.69	-1.87
Conservative	Patrice Aubin	344	1.18	+0.42
Option nationale	Mathilde Lefebvre	116	0.36	–
Total valid votes		32,153	99.03	–
Total rejected ballots		316	0.97	–
Turnout		32,469	75.23	-0.89
Electors on the lists		43,158	–	–
Liberal hold		Swing		+7.10
