= Bellechasse (provincial electoral district) =

Provincial electoral district in Quebec, Canada

Coordinates: 46°40′N 70°30′W

Quebec electoral district

Provincial electoral district
- Legislature: National Assembly of Quebec
MNA
Éric Duhaime
Conservative
- District created: 1867
- First contested: 1867
- Last contested: 2026

Demographics
- Population (2006): 51,836
- Electors (2012): 42,676
- Area (km²): 3,204.9
- Pop. density (per km²): 16.2
- Census division(s): Bellechasse (all), Les Etchemins (part), Lévis (part)
- Census subdivision(s): Lévis (part); Armagh, Beaumont, Honfleur, Lac-Etchemin, La Durantaye, Notre-Dame-Auxiliatrice-de-Buckland, Saint-Anselme, Saint-Camille-de-Lellis, Saint-Charles-de-Bellechasse, Sainte-Claire, Saint-Cyprien, Saint-Damien-de-Buckland, Saint-Gervais, Saint-Henri, Sainte-Justine, Saint-Lazare-de-Bellechasse, Saint-Léon-de-Standon, Saint-Louis-de-Gonzague, Saint-Luc-de-Bellechasse, Saint-Magloire, Saint-Malachie, Saint-Michel-de-Bellechasse, Saint-Nazaire-de-Dorchester, Saint-Nérée-de-Bellechasse, Saint-Philémon, Saint-Raphaël, Sainte-Rose-de-Watford, Sainte-Sabine, Saint-Vallier

Bellechasse (French pronunciation: [bɛlʃas]) is a provincial electoral district in the Chaudière-Appalaches region of Quebec, Canada, which elects a member to the National Assembly of Quebec. It notably includes a section of the city of Lévis as well as Saint-Henri, Saint-Anselme, Lac-Etchemin, Sainte-Claire, Beaumont, Saint-Charles-de-Bellechasse, Saint-Raphaël, and Saint-Gervais.

It was created for the 1867 election, and electoral districts of that name existed even earlier: see Bellechasse (Province of Canada) and Bellechasse (Lower Canada).

In the change from the 2001 to the 2011 electoral map, it gained part of the Desjardins borough of the city of Lévis, namely the portion south of Quebec Autoroute 20.

== Members of the Legislative Assembly / National Assembly ==
Legislature	Years	Member	Party
1st	1867–1871	Onésime Pelletier	Liberal
2nd	1871–1875	Onésime Pelletier	Liberal
3rd	1875–1878	Pierre Fradet	Conservative
4th	1878–1881	Pierre Boutin	Liberal
5th	1881–1886	Faucher de Saint-Maurice	Conservative
6th	1886–1890	Faucher de Saint-Maurice	Conservative
7th	1890–1892	Adélard Turgeon	Liberal
8th	1892–1897	Adélard Turgeon	Liberal
9th	1897–1900	Adélard Turgeon	Liberal
10th	1900–1904	Adélard Turgeon	Liberal
11th	1904–1908	Adélard Turgeon	Liberal
12th	1908–1909	Adélard Turgeon	Liberal
12th	1909–1912	Antonin Galipeault	Liberal
13th	1912–1916	Antonin Galipeault	Liberal
14th	1916–1919	Antonin Galipeault	Liberal
15th	1919–1923	Antonin Galipeault	Liberal
16th	1923–1927	Antonin Galipeault	Liberal
17th	1927–1930	Antonin Galipeault	Liberal
17th	1930–1931	Robert Taschereau	Liberal
18th	1931–1935	Robert Taschereau	Liberal
19th	1935–1936	Robert Taschereau	Liberal
20th	1936–1939	Émile Boiteau	Union Nationale
21st	1939–1944	Valmore Bienvenue	Liberal
22nd	1944–1948	Valmore Bienvenue	Liberal
23rd	1948–1952	Paul-Eugène Bélanger	Union Nationale
24th	1952–1956	Alphée Poirier	Union Nationale
25th	1956–1960	Alphée Poirier	Union Nationale
26th	1960–1962	Gustave Plante	Liberal
27th	1962–1966	Gabriel Loubier	Union Nationale
28th	1966–1970	Gabriel Loubier	Union Nationale
29th	1970–1973	Gabriel Loubier	Union Nationale
30th	1973–1976	Pierre Mercier	Liberal
31st	1976–1981	Bertrand Goulet	Union Nationale
32nd	1981–1985	Claude Lachance	Parti Québécois
33rd	1985–1989	Louise Begin	Liberal
34th	1989–1994	Louise Begin	Liberal
35th	1994–1998	Claude Lachance	Parti Québécois
36th	1998–2003	Claude Lachance	Parti Québécois
37th	2003–2007	Dominique Vien	Liberal
38th	2007–2008	Jean Domingue	Action démocratique
39th	2008–2012	Dominique Vien	Liberal
40th	2012–2014	Dominique Vien	Liberal
41st	2014–2018	Dominique Vien	Liberal
42nd	2018–2022	Stéphanie Lachance	Coalition Avenir Québec
43rd	2022–2026	Stéphanie Lachance	Coalition Avenir Québec
44th	2026–Present	Éric Duhaime	Conservative

== Election results ==
2026 Quebec general election
** Preliminary results — Not yet official **
Party	Candidate	Votes	%	±%
Conservative	Éric Duhaime	22,527	63.84	+28.58
Parti Québécois	Jérôme Couture	5,306	15.04	+6.21
Coalition Avenir Québec	Stéphanie Lachance	3,301	9.35	–36.39
Liberal	Richard Garon	2,621	7.43	+3.30
Québec solidaire	Raphaël Bédard	1,447	4.10	–1.94
Démocratie directe	Jean-Pierre Hamel	84	0.24	N/A
Total valid votes		35,286	98.83	+0.32
Total rejected ballots		419	1.17	–0.32
Turnout		35,705	77.29	+3.43
Electors on the lists		46,198		
Conservative gain from Coalition Avenir Québec		Swing		+11.19
Source: Élections Québec

2022 Quebec general election
Party	Candidate	Votes	%	±%
Coalition Avenir Québec	Stéphanie Lachance	15,065	45.74	–8.11
Conservative	Michel Tardif	11,612	35.26	+32.04
Parti Québécois	Jean-Daniel Fontaine	2,908	8.83	+1.57
Québec solidaire	Jérôme D'Auteuil Sirois	1,988	6.04	–1.46
Liberal	François Bégin	1,360	4.13	–23.03
Total valid votes		32,933	98.51	+0.25
Total rejected ballots		497	1.49	–0.25
Turnout		33,430	73.86	+3.76
Electors on the lists		45,261	–	–

2018 Quebec general election
Party	Candidate	Votes	%	±%
Coalition Avenir Québec	Stéphanie Lachance	16,302	53.85	+20.67
Liberal	Dominique Vien	8,223	27.16	-22.11
Québec solidaire	Benoit Comeau	2,272	7.5	+4.81
Parti Québécois	Benoît Béchard	2,198	7.26	-6.06
Conservative	Dominique Messner	976	3.22	+2.04
Bloc Pot	Simon Guay	200	0.66	
Alliance provinciale	Sébastien Roy	103	0.34	
Total valid votes		30,274	98.26	
Total rejected ballots		535	1.74	
Turnout		30,809	70.10	
Eligible voters		43,947		
Coalition Avenir Québec gain from Liberal		Swing		+21.39
Source(s) "Rapport des résultats officiels du scrutin". Élections Québec.

2014 Quebec general election
Party	Candidate	Votes	%	±%
Liberal	Dominique Vien	15,843	49.27	+9.41
Coalition Avenir Québec	Stéphanie Lachance	10,668	33.18	-4.78
Parti Québécois	Linda Goupil	4,283	13.32	-1.64
Québec solidaire	Benoit Comeau	378	2.69	-1.87
Conservative	Patrice Aubin	344	1.18	+0.42
Option nationale	Mathilde Lefebvre	116	0.36	–
Total valid votes		32,153	99.03	–
Total rejected ballots		316	0.97	–
Turnout		32,469	75.23	-0.89
Electors on the lists		43,158	–	–
Liberal hold		Swing		+7.10

2012 Quebec general election
Party	Candidate	Votes	%	±%
Liberal	Dominique Vien	13,119	40.67	-4.52
Coalition Avenir Québec	Christian Lévesque	12,421	38.51	+2.31
Parti Québécois	Clément Pouliot	4,896	15.18	-0.81
Québec solidaire	Benoit Comeau	989	3.07	+0.56
Middle Class	Patrice Aubin	344	1.07	–
Conservative	Linda Beaudoin	215	0.67	–
Équipe Autonomiste	Sébastien Ruel	156	0.48	–
Unité Nationale	Christine Lavoie	115	0.36	–
Total valid votes		32,255	98.80	–
Total rejected ballots		393	1.20	–
Turnout		32,648	76.12	+11.77
Electors on the lists		42,892	–	–

^ Change is based on redistributed results. Coalition Avenir change is from Action démocratique.

2008 Quebec general election
Party	Candidate	Votes	%	±%
Liberal	Dominique Vien	10,530	47.66	+13.31
Action démocratique	Jean Domingue	7,598	34.39	-14.12
Parti Québécois	Jerry Beaudoin	3,450	15.61	+2.18
Québec solidaire	Jean-Nicolas Denis	518	2.34	0.59
Total valid votes		22,096	98.71	–
Total rejected ballots		289	1.29	–
Turnout		22,385	64.35	-12.42
Electors on the lists		34,785	–	–

2007 Quebec general election
Party	Candidate	Votes	%	±%
Action démocratique	Jean Domingue	12,715	48.51	+15.40
Liberal	Dominique Vien	9,004	34.35	-3.23
Parti Québécois	Sylvie Vallières	3,521	13.43	-14.14
Green	Ghislain Gaulin	512	1.95	+0.73
Québec solidaire	Colin Perreault	460	1.75	+1.23*
Total valid votes		26,212	99.28	–
Total rejected ballots		191	0.72	–
Turnout		26,403	76.77	+0.67
Electors on the lists		34,391	–	–

2003 Quebec general election
Party	Candidate	Votes	%	±%
Liberal	Dominique Vien	9,658	37.58	-0.84
Action démocratique	Serge Carbonneau	8,507	33.11	+19.88
Parti Québécois	Claude Lachance	7,084	27.57	-20.01
Green	Sylvain Castonguay	314	1.22	–
UFP	Mario Ouellette	134	0.52	–
Total valid votes		25,697	99.12	–
Total rejected ballots		228	0.88	–
Turnout		25,925	76.00	-3.00
Electors on the lists		34,069	–	–

1998 Quebec general election
Party	Candidate	Votes	%	±%
Parti Québécois	Claude Lachance	11,323	47.58	-1.00
Liberal	Roger McCaughry	9,144	38.42	+2.03
Action démocratique	Sylvain Allie	3,149	13.23	-3.80
Socialist Democracy	Lise Rose	184	0.77	–
Total valid votes		23,800	98.97	–
Total rejected ballots		248	1.03	–
Turnout		24,048	79.00	+1.00
Electors on the lists		30,374	–	–

* Result compared to UFP

1995 Quebec referendum
Side	Votes	%
Non	13,927	52.85
Oui	12,425	47.15

1994 Quebec general election
Party	Candidate	Votes	%
Parti Québécois	Claude Lachance	10,570	46.58
Liberal	Gilles Guillemette	8,258	36.39
Action démocratique	Benoit Aubé	3,865	17.03
Total valid votes		22,693	98.14
Total rejected ballots		429	1.86
Turnout		23,122	78.10
Electors on the lists		29,607	–

1992 Charlottetown Accord referendum
Side	Votes	%
Non	12,712	57.36
Oui	9,451	42.64

1989 Quebec general election
Party	Candidate	Votes	%
Liberal	Louise Bégin	11,114	50.43
Parti Québécois	Claude Lachance	10,923	49.57
Total valid votes		22,037	97.34
Total rejected ballots		602	2.66
Turnout		22,639	76.48
Electors on the lists		29,602	–

1985 Quebec general election
Party	Candidate	Votes	%
Liberal	Louise Bégin	11,114	54.82
Parti Québécois	Claude Lachance	10,238	44.00
Christian Socialism	Harold Chrétien	275	1.18
Total valid votes		23,267	98.39
Total rejected ballots		380	1.61
Turnout		23,647	79.02
Electors on the lists		29,927	–

1981 Quebec general election
Party	Candidate	Votes	%
Parti Québécois	Claude Lachance	9,194	37.58
Liberal	Pierre Mercier	8,830	36.10
Union Nationale	Bertrand Goulet	6,440	26.32
Total valid votes		24,464	99.27
Total rejected ballots		179	0.73
Turnout		24,643	82.56
Electors on the lists		29,848	–

1980 Quebec referendum
Side	Votes	%
Non	14,908	61.12
Oui	9,483	38.88

1976 Quebec general election
Party	Candidate	Votes	%
Union Nationale	Bertrand Goulet	8,501	36.85
Liberal	Pierre Mercier	7,703	33.39
Parti Québécois	Jean-Roch Côté	5,881	25.49
Ralliement créditiste	Sauveur Fradette	692	3.00
Parti national populaire	Pierre-E. Plante	294	1.27
Total valid votes		23,071	98.19
Total rejected ballots		426	1.81
Turnout		23,497	81.68
Electors on the lists		28,768	–

1973 Quebec general election
Party	Candidate	Votes	%
Liberal	Pierre Mercier	9,206	44.30
Union Nationale	Gabriel Loubier	8,162	39.28
Parti Québécois	Thérèse Veilleux Fortin	2,054	9.89
Parti créditiste	Claude Gignac	1,357	6.53
Total valid votes		20,779	97.89
Total rejected ballots		448	2.11
Turnout		21,227	78.57
Electors on the lists		27,016	–

1970 Quebec general election
Party	Candidate	Votes	%
Union Nationale	Gabriel Loubier	6,111	50.56
Liberal	Joseph-Gérald Bossé	3,068	25.38
Ralliement créditiste	René Lemieux	2,596	21.48
Parti Québécois	Antoine Desmeules	311	2.57
Total valid votes		12,086	98.95
Total rejected ballots		128	1.05
Turnout		12,214	86.34
Electors on the lists		14,147	–

1966 Quebec general election
Party	Candidate	Votes	%
Union Nationale	Gabriel Loubier	6,917	58.80
Liberal	Bernard Lacroix	4,846	41.20
Total valid votes		11,763	98.35
Total rejected ballots		197	1.65
Turnout		11,960	83.15
Electors on the lists		14,384	–

1962 Quebec general election
Party	Candidate	Votes	%
Union Nationale	Gabriel Loubier	5,176	51.35
Liberal	Benoît Boulanger	4,903	48.65
Total valid votes		10,079	99.19
Total rejected ballots		82	0.81
Turnout		10,161	80.81
Electors on the lists		12,574	–

1960 Quebec general election
Party	Candidate	Votes	%
Liberal	Gustave Plante	5,601	52.06
Union Nationale	Alphée Poirier	5,157	47.94
Total valid votes		10,758	99.10
Total rejected ballots		98	0.90
Turnout		10,856	86.88
Electors on the lists		12,496	–

1956 Quebec general election
Party	Candidate	Votes	%
Union Nationale	Alphée Poirier	6,243	57.89
Liberal	Herménégilde Champagne	4,541	42.11
Total valid votes		10,784	98.95
Total rejected ballots		114	1.05
Turnout		10,898	82.86
Electors on the lists		13,152	–

1952 Quebec general election
Party	Candidate	Votes	%
Union Nationale	Alphée Poirier	5,814	54.65
Liberal	Laurent Lizotte	4,825	45.35
Total valid votes		10,639	98.59
Total rejected ballots		152	1.41
Turnout		10,791	81.31
Electors on the lists		13,272	–

1948 Quebec general election
Party	Candidate	Votes	%
Union Nationale	Paul-Eugène Bélanger	5,027	48.48
Liberal	Valmore Bienvenue	4,246	40.95
Union des électeurs	Joseph Gagné	1,096	10.57
Total valid votes		10,369	99.09
Total rejected ballots		95	0.91
Turnout		10,464	83.49
Electors on the lists		12,533	–

1944 Quebec general election
Party	Candidate	Votes	%
Liberal	Valmore Bienvenue	4,762	49.72
Union Nationale	Émile Boiteau	4,217	44.03
Bloc populaire	Joseph-Albert Bonenfant	599	6.25
Total valid votes		9,578	99.23
Total rejected ballots		74	0.77
Turnout		9,652	79.16
Electors on the lists		12,193	–

1939 Quebec general election
Party	Candidate	Votes	%
Liberal	Valmore Bienvenue	2,515	53.25
Union Nationale	Émile Boiteau	2,131	45.12
Action libérale nationale	Lucien Faguy	77	1.63
Total valid votes		4,723	98.95
Total rejected ballots		50	1.05
Turnout		4,773	83.88
Electors on the lists		5,690	–

1936 Quebec general election
Party	Candidate	Votes	%
Union Nationale	Émile Boiteau	2,780	55.14
Liberal	Eugène Marquis	2,262	44.86
Total valid votes		5,042	99.33
Total rejected ballots		34	0.67
Turnout		5,076	88.76
Electors on the lists		5,719	–

1935 Quebec general election
Party	Candidate	Votes	%
Liberal	Robert Taschereau	2,483	54.08
Action libérale nationale	Homisdas Deschênes	2,108	45.92
Total valid votes		4,591	98.71
Total rejected ballots		60	1.29
Turnout		4,651	83.22
Electors on the lists		5,589	–

1931 Quebec general election
Party	Candidate	Votes	%
Liberal	Robert Taschereau	2,839	67.82
Conservative	Joseph-Louis-Octave Corriveau	1,347	32.18
Total valid votes		4,186	99.90
Total rejected ballots		4	0.10
Turnout		4,190	84.44
Electors on the lists		4,962	–

Quebec provincial by-election, 1930
Party	Candidate	Votes	%
Liberal	Robert Taschereau	2,412	61.36
Independent Liberal	Joseph-Alfred Nadeau	1,519	38.64
Total valid votes		3,931	99.22
Total rejected ballots		31	0.78
Turnout		3,962	83.94
Electors on the lists		4,720	–

1927 Quebec general election
Party	Candidate	Votes	%
Liberal	Antonin Galipeault	2,969	95.99
Conservative	Robert Côté	124	4.01
Total valid votes		3,093	99.87
Total rejected ballots		4	0.13
Turnout		3,097	66.09
Electors on the lists		4,686	–

1923 Quebec general election
Party	Candidate	Votes
Liberal	Antonin Galipeault	Acclaimed
Electors on the lists		4,766

Quebec provincial by-election, 1919
Party	Candidate	Votes
Liberal	Antonin Galipeault	Acclaimed

1919 Quebec general election
Party	Candidate	Votes
Liberal	Antonin Galipeault	Acclaimed
Electors on the lists		4,909

1916 Quebec general election
Party	Candidate	Votes	%
Liberal	Antonin Galipeault	2,748	71.82
Conservative	William Amyot	1,078	4.01
Total valid votes		3,826	98.99
Total rejected ballots		39	1.01
Turnout		3,865	78.07
Electors on the lists		4,951	–

1912 Quebec general election
Party	Candidate	Votes	%
Liberal	Antonin Galipeault	2,220	60.61
Conservative	Joseph-Émile Gelly	1,443	39.39
Total valid votes		3,663	98.95
Total rejected ballots		39	1.05
Turnout		3,702	79.65
Electors on the lists		4,648	–

Quebec provincial by-election, 1909
Party	Candidate	Votes
Liberal	Antonin Galipeault	Acclaimed

1908 Quebec general election
Party	Candidate	Votes	%
Liberal	Adélard Turgeon	1,936	65.92
Conservative	Éphrem Audet	1,001	34.08
Total valid votes		2,937	99.42
Total rejected ballots		17	0.58
Turnout		2,954	72.94
Electors on the lists		4,050	–

Quebec provincial by-election, 1907
Party	Candidate	Votes	%
Liberal	Adélard Turgeon	1,967	61.76
Independent	Henri Bourassa	1,218	38.24
Total valid votes		3,185	99.13
Total rejected ballots		28	0.87
Turnout		3,213	80.51
Electors on the lists		3,991	–

Quebec provincial by-election, 1905
Party	Candidate	Votes
Liberal	Adélard Turgeon	Acclaimed

1904 Quebec general election
Party	Candidate	Votes
Liberal	Adélard Turgeon	Acclaimed
Electors on the lists		4,100

1900 Quebec general election
Party	Candidate	Votes
Liberal	Adélard Turgeon	Acclaimed
Electors on the lists		3,816

1897 Quebec general election
Party	Candidate	Votes
Liberal	Adélard Turgeon	Acclaimed

1897 Quebec general election
Party	Candidate	Votes	%
Liberal	Adélard Turgeon	1,726	57.19
Conservative	François Castonguay	1,292	342.81
Total valid votes		3,018	99.24
Total rejected ballots		23	0.76
Turnout		3,041	82.26
Electors on the lists		3,697	–

1892 Quebec general election
Party	Candidate	Votes	%
Liberal	Adélard Turgeon	1,391	50.33
Conservative	Éphrem Audet	1,373	49.67
Total valid votes		2,764	99.32
Total rejected ballots		19	0.68
Turnout		2,783	81.35
Electors on the lists		3,421	–

1890 Quebec general election
Party	Candidate	Votes	%
Liberal	Adélard Turgeon	1,367	55.19
Conservative	Narcisse-Henri-Édouard Faucher de Saint-Maurice	1,110	44.81
Total valid votes		2,477	99.16
Total rejected ballots		21	0.84
Turnout		2,498	72.81
Electors on the lists		3,431	–

1886 Quebec general election
Party	Candidate	Votes	%
Conservative	Narcisse-Henri-Édouard Faucher de Saint-Maurice	1,195	50.49
Liberal	Charles Langelier	1,172	49.51
Total valid votes		2,367	98.95
Total rejected ballots		25	1.05
Turnout		2,392	81.89
Electors on the lists		2,921	–

1881 Quebec general election
Party	Candidate	Votes	%
Conservative	Narcisse-Henri-Édouard Faucher de Saint-Maurice	992	50.77
Liberal	Pierre Boutin	962	49.23
Total valid votes		1,954	98.14
Total rejected ballots		37	1.86
Turnout		1,991	75.88
Electors on the lists		2,624	–

1878 Quebec general election
Party	Candidate	Votes	%
Liberal	Pierre Boutin	1,090	55.93
Conservative	Pierre Fradet	859	44.07
Total valid votes		1,949	98.58
Total rejected ballots		28	1.42
Turnout		1,977	78.76
Electors on the lists		2,510	–

1875 Quebec general election
Party	Candidate	Votes	%
Conservative	Pierre Fradet	762	51.80
Liberal	Onésime Pelletier	510	34.67
Conservative	Marcel Chabot	199	13.53
Total valid votes		1,471	95.77
Total rejected ballots		65	4.23
Turnout		1,536	66.38
Electors on the lists		2,314	–

1867 Quebec general election
Party	Candidate	Votes	%
Liberal	Onésime Pelletier	857	94.97
Conservative	Marcel Chabot	780	5.03
Total valid votes		1,637	100.00
Turnout		1,637	80.09
Electors on the lists		2,044	–

== See also ==
- List of Quebec provincial electoral districts
- Canadian provincial electoral districts
