= Hubert LaRue =

Quebec physician and writer

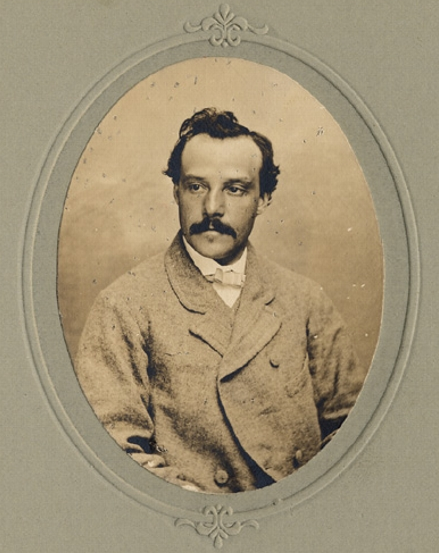
- Born: March 24, 1833; Saint-Jean-de-l'Île-d'Orléans, Lower Canada
- Died: September 25, 1881 (aged 48); Quebec City, Quebec, Canada
- Occupation: Writer (novelist)
- Spouse: Marie-Alphonsine Panet (m. 1860)
- Children: 10
- Writing career
- Period: 19th century
- Genres: History, fiction

François Alexandre Hubert LaRue (March 24, 1833 – September 25, 1881) was a French-Canadian writer and medical doctor.

== Biography ==
Born in Saint-Jean-de-l'île d'Orléans on March 24, 1833, son of notary Hubert Casimir Nazaire Larue and Adélaïde Roy, he married Alphonsine Panet, daughter of Judge Philippe Panet and Luce Casgrain. Together they raised ten children.

He attended the Petit Séminaire de Québec and went on to study medicine at the Laval University in Montreal. Briefly attending a university in Louvain, Belgium he transferred to the École de Médicine in Paris where he furthered his scientific training. When he returned to Quebec he began teaching at Laval in a variety of subjects including forensic medicine, inorganic chemistry, histology and toxicology.

La Rue was a major contributor to the literary movement of 1860. He wrote extensively in the magazines and newspapers of his time, notably in the Courrier du Canada, L'Événement, Soirées Canadiennes, Foyer Canadien, and in La Ruche littéraire, where he signed his name Isidore de Méplats. One of his most remarkable studies is his work on Chansons populaires et historiques du Canada (1863), which he published: Le Voyage sentimental sur la rue Saint-Jean; départ en 1860, retour en 1880 (1879); le Voyage autour de l'Isle d'Orléans. His articles, studies and lectures were collected in two volumes under the collective title Mélanges historiques, littéraires, et d'économie politique (1870 and 1881). LaRue also published a Histoire populaire du Canada (1875).

LaRue was also interested in educational and agricultural reforms. In an article, De l’éducation dans la province de Québec, he describes steps to improve education at the elementary and secondary levels. He also advocated for teaching of agriculture in specialized schools. As well, he tried to improve farming on depleted soils. He did this through the publication of manuals such as Petit manuel d’agriculture à l’usage des cultivateurs and Petit manuel d’agriculture à l’usage des écoles élémentaires.

Later in life he became interested in metallurgy. He took out patents for methods of separating sands using magnets. He also patented a process for concentrating pyrites to extract their magnetite.

== Works ==
- Voyage Autour De L'Isle D'Orléans, (1861)
- Petit Manuel D'Agriculture, (1870)
- Mélanges Historiques, Littéraires, Et D'Économie Politique, (1870-81)
- Histoire Populaire Du Canada, (1875)
- Voyage Sentimental Sur La Rue Saint-Jean, (1879)
- Petite Histoire Des Etats-Unis Très-Élémentaire, (1880)
