= Saint-Nazaire-de-Dorchester =

- Parish municipality
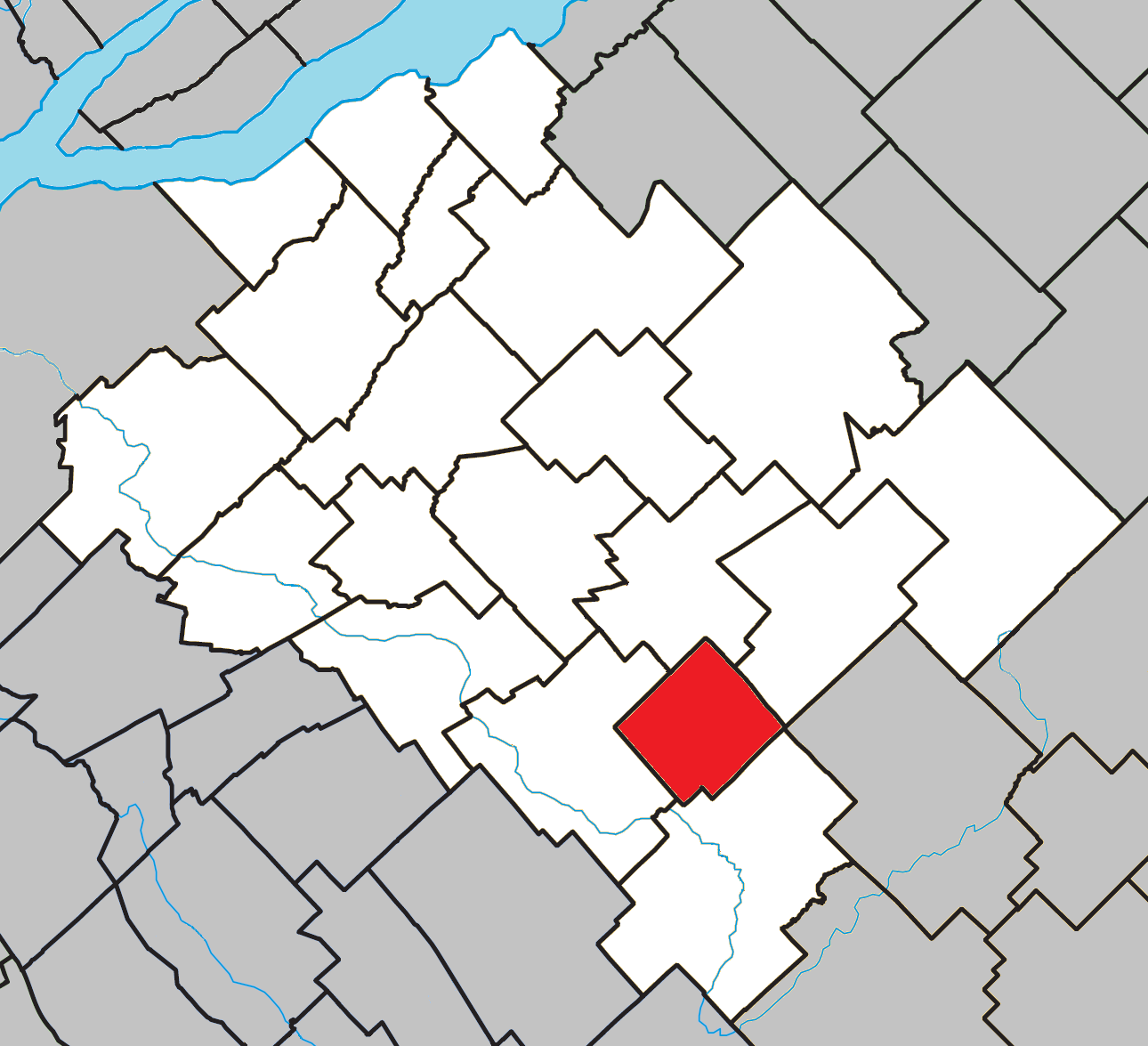
- Location within Bellechasse RCM.

- Location in province of Quebec.
- Coordinates: 46°33′N 70°40′W
- Country: Canada
- Province: Quebec
- Region: Chaudière-Appalaches
- RCM: Bellechasse
- Constituted: March 9, 1906

Government
  - Mayor: Clément Fillion
  - Fed. riding: Bellechasse—Les Etchemins—Lévis
  - Prov. riding: Bellechasse

Area
  - Total: 51.60 km^{2} (19.92 sq mi)
  - Land: 51.76 km^{2} (19.98 sq mi)
- There is an apparent contradiction between two authoritative sources

Population (2011)
  - Total: 355
  - Density: 6.9/km^{2} (18/sq mi)
  - Pop 2006–2011: ▼7.8%
  - Dwellings: 197
- Time zone: UTC−5 (EST)
  - Summer (DST): UTC−4 (EDT)
- Postal code(s): G0R 3T0
- Area codes: 418 and 581
- Highways: R-216
- Website: www.saint-nazaire- de-dorchester.org

Saint-Nazaire-de-Dorchester is a parish municipality of 400 people in the Bellechasse Regional County Municipality, Quebec, part of the Chaudière-Appalaches administrative region. It is the least populous municipality in Bellechasse.

== Demographics ==
In the 2021 Census of Population conducted by Statistics Canada, Saint-Nazaire-de-Dorchester had a population of 338 living in 149 of its 178 total private dwellings, a change of −6.9% from its 2016 population of 363. With a land area of 51.56 km^{2} (19.91 sq mi), it had a population density of 6.6/km^{2} (17.0/sq mi) in 2021.
