= Joseph Marmette =

Canadian novelist and historian (1844–1895)

Joseph-Étienne-Eugène Marmette
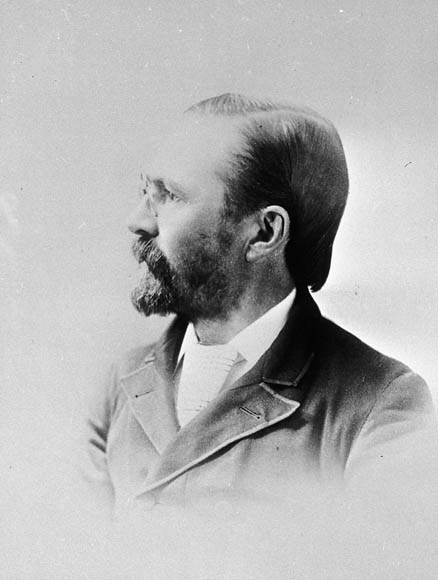
- Born: October 25, 1844; Montmagny, Canada East
- Died: May 7, 1895 (aged 50); Ottawa, Ontario

Joseph-Étienne-Eugène Marmette (October 25, 1844 – May 7, 1895) was a Canadian novelist and historian.

== Life ==
Born in Montmagny, Canada East, Marmette was educated at the Séminaire de Québec and Regiopolis College. He started studying law at the Université Laval but did not complete his studies. Instead he became a clerk in the office of the Treasury of the provincial government.

In the 1870s, Marmette was part of a literary group known varyingly as "la société d'admiration mutuelle," "le cénacle de la rue d'Aiguillon," and "la pléiade de Saint-Maurice." The group, which included Faucher de Saint-Maurice and Oscar Dunn, gathered regularly in the home of Prosper Bender in Quebec City, and the salon's conversations helped inspire and mold these literary figures' works.

In 1882, Marmette moved to Europe when he was appointed a special agent for immigration for Switzerland and France. While in Europe, he was appointed Canadian archivist in France. He was succeeded by Édouard Richard.

He was one of the founders of the "Cercle des Dix", a group where literature, history, science, and geography were discussed. Other members were Benjamin Sulte, Alfred Duclos, and Alphonse Lusignan.

His daughter Marie-Louise Marmette was an author and lecturer.

He died in Ottawa, Ontario in 1895.

== Thematic and aesthetic ==
Joseph Marmette wrote mainly historical novels, covering the period of New France and immediately after the War of the Conquest. His works provides a detailed historical framework and are inspired by the romantic school and the characters are shared between good and evil.

His first historical novel Charles and Eva, written at the age of 20, appeared in The Canadian Journal from December 1866 to May 1867. It happened during the expedition of New France against Corlar (Schenectady) in the colony of New York in 1689. Canadians showed their courage and endurance. The hero of the novel, Charles Couillard-Dupuis, falls in love with the orphan Eva Frantova and brings her back to Quebec. The book marks a novelty in the novelistic genre of Quebec literature, placing fictitious action in a real event and compelling an important historiographical research.

A posthumous edition is made in 1945 by Éditions Lumen. The novel "François de Bienville" (1870), scenes from Canadian life in the seventeenth century, focuses on the historical figure of François Le Moyne de Bienville.

"L'Intendant Bigot" (1872) is a novel centered on the historical figure of François Bigot, a dishonest steward of New France.

The book "Heroism and Treason - Canadian Stories" (1879) contains an addition on the heroic deeds of Madeleine de Verchères against Iroquois.

== Selected bibliography ==
- Charles and Éva (1868)
- François de Bienville (1870)
- L'Intendant bigot (1872)
- Le Chevalier de Mornac (1873)
- La fiancée du rebelle (1875)
- Les Macchabées de la Nouvelle France (1878)
