= Marie-Louise Marmette =

French Canadian journalist, writer and speaker

- Marie Louise Joséphine Esther Eliza Marmette
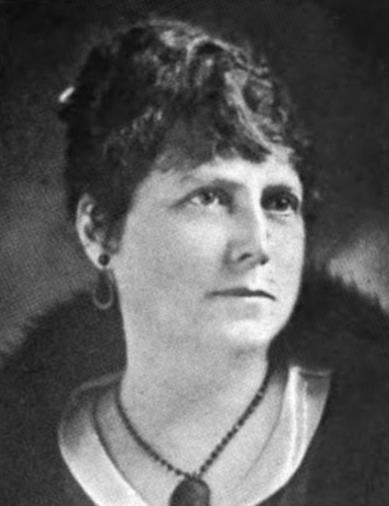
- Born: March 29, 1870; Quebec, Canada
- Died: May 2, 1928 (aged 58); Montreal, Canada
- Occupations: Journalist, writer and speaker
- Spouse: Donat Brodeur (m. 1892)
- Children: 8
- Writing career
- Language: French
- Genre: Female
- Notable awards: Toponym "Street Marie-Louise Marmette" in Montreal

Marie-Louise Marmette (1870–1928) (baptized as Marie-Louise-Joséphine-Esther-Eliza), known as Louyse de Bienville (Brodeur), was a French-Canadian author and lecturer. She often used the pseudonym Domino Noir.

== Youth ==
Marie-Louise Marmette was born in Quebec on March 29, 1870. Her mother was Marie-Joséphine Garneau. Her father, Joseph-Étienne-Eugène Marmette, was a prolific francophone writer and one of the founders of the Cercle des Dix, an Ottawa literary society, who she accompanied to several literary salons in Quebec City. Her maternal grandfather was the historian François-Xavier Garneau.

From 1880 to 1882, Marie-Louise studied with the religious community of the Ursulines of Quebec. She continued her studies in Ottawa with the Congrégation de Notre-Dame, and studied literature in the four years her family lived in Paris, during her father's appointment as an archivist for the Canadian Federal Government. She was married in the summer of 1892 in Ottawa to Donat Brodeur, who practiced law. The couple subsequently settled in Montreal and had eight children.

== Literary career ==
Marmette's writing, an interest inspired by the 1870 novel François de Bienville, spanned 25 years.

- 1902–1909: contributed to the Journal de Françoise, which was founded in Montreal by the journalist Robertine Barry.
- 1913–1915: continued to collaborate with the Montreal women's press, notably in the magazine Pour Vous mesdames; this magazine was founded and directed by Georgine Bélanger.
- 1913–1916: published writings in La Bonne Parole, the origin of the National Federation of Saint-Jean-Baptiste, an organization she was actively involved in. Under the aegis of this organization, she lectured during monthly meetings of the Professional Association of Factory Employees and the Professional Association of Shop Employees (associations overseen by the federation).
- 1920–1924: had two of her texts published in La Revue moderne of Anne-Marie Gleason.

Marmette contributed to general publications, in particular: Le Temps d'Ottawa, Le Pays de Montréal, Le Courrier de Montmagny, and Le Soleil. However, she never published a book. She also wrote literary chronicles, biographies, short stories, tales, poetry, and essays on a variety of topics including current affairs.

She also wrote about the state of national literature and the advent of feminism, which she considered to be one of the most serious undertakings of humanity. Her writing on this subject appeared in the October 1913 edition of Pour Vous mesdames. An admirer of French women's courage in this struggle, she wrote in June 1916, "A people magnified by such women will never be defeated." In a daily newspaper column for the newspaper La Presse of January 18, 1919, writing on women's suffrage, she claimed voting as a right for women, as well as its free use.

Marmette also demonstrated an interest in current affairs, especially World War I (in which her three sons signed up as volunteers), publishing a column "War Pages" in the magazine Pour Vous Mesdames in October 1914, and later columns in La Bonne Parole in February, March, May, and June 1916.

Following the death of Marie-Louise in 1928, her daughter Marguerite collected nearly thirty examples of her writings and published them in 1931 in Montreal under the title Figures et Paysages. This posthumous publication, heralded as the first of four, aimed to pay her mother a tribute; however, there was no follow-up to it.

== Family ==
In the summer of 1892, in Ottawa, Marmette married Donat Brodeur, a lawyer. They settled in Montreal and had eight children.

She died in Montreal on May 2, 1928.

== Bibliography ==
- Article "Louyse Marmette, journaliste, petite-fille de F.-Xavier Garneau", by René Houde, La Presse, Montreal, July 28, 1966, p. 14 - Biographical summary.
- Commission de toponymie du Québec - Banque de noms de lieux - Toponym: "Marie-Louise Marmette" street of Montreal.
