= Jean-Baptiste-Alphonse Lusignan =

French-Canadian writer

Jean-Baptiste-Alphonse Lusignan (27 September 1843 at Saint-Denis-sur-Richelieu, Canada East – 5 January 1893) was a French-Canadian writer.

== Life ==
His parents were Jean-Baptiste Lusignan, a merchant, and Onésime Masse. He was educated at St-Hyacinthe College and studied theology there and at Montreal Seminary. Judging after three years that he had no vocation for the Catholic Church, he studied law at St-Hyacinthe and at Laval University, Quebec, and practised in the former city for a few years.

He contributed to several newspapers and was chief editor (1865–68) of Le Pays, the principal organ of the French-Canadian Liberal party at the time. Lusignan published (1872), as a continuation of a similar work by Judge Ramsay, a "Digest of Reported cases"; "Coups d'oeil et coups de plume" (1884). A leading francophone author, he was elected (1885) a member of the Royal Society of Canada.
