= National Assembly of Quebec =

Provincial legislative body in Canada

National Assembly of Quebec Assemblée nationale du Québec
- 44th Quebec Legislature

Type
- Type: Unicameral house of the Quebec Legislature

History
- Founded: December 31, 1968
- Preceded by: Legislative Assembly of Quebec

Leadership
- President: Vacant
- Premier: Paul St-Pierre Plamondon, PQ since October 21, 2026
- Government House Leader: Catherine Gentilcore, PQ since October 21, 2026
- Opposition Leader: Charles Milliard, Liberal since October 5, 2026
- Opposition House Leader: André Fortin, Liberal since October 18, 2026

Structure
- Seats: 127
- Political groups: Government (60): Parti Québécois (60); Official Opposition (39): Liberal (39); Parties with official status (19): Conservative (19); Parties without official status (9): Québec solidaire (9)

Elections
- Voting system: First-past-the-post
- Last election: October 5, 2026
- Next election: October 7, 2030 (scheduled)

Meeting place
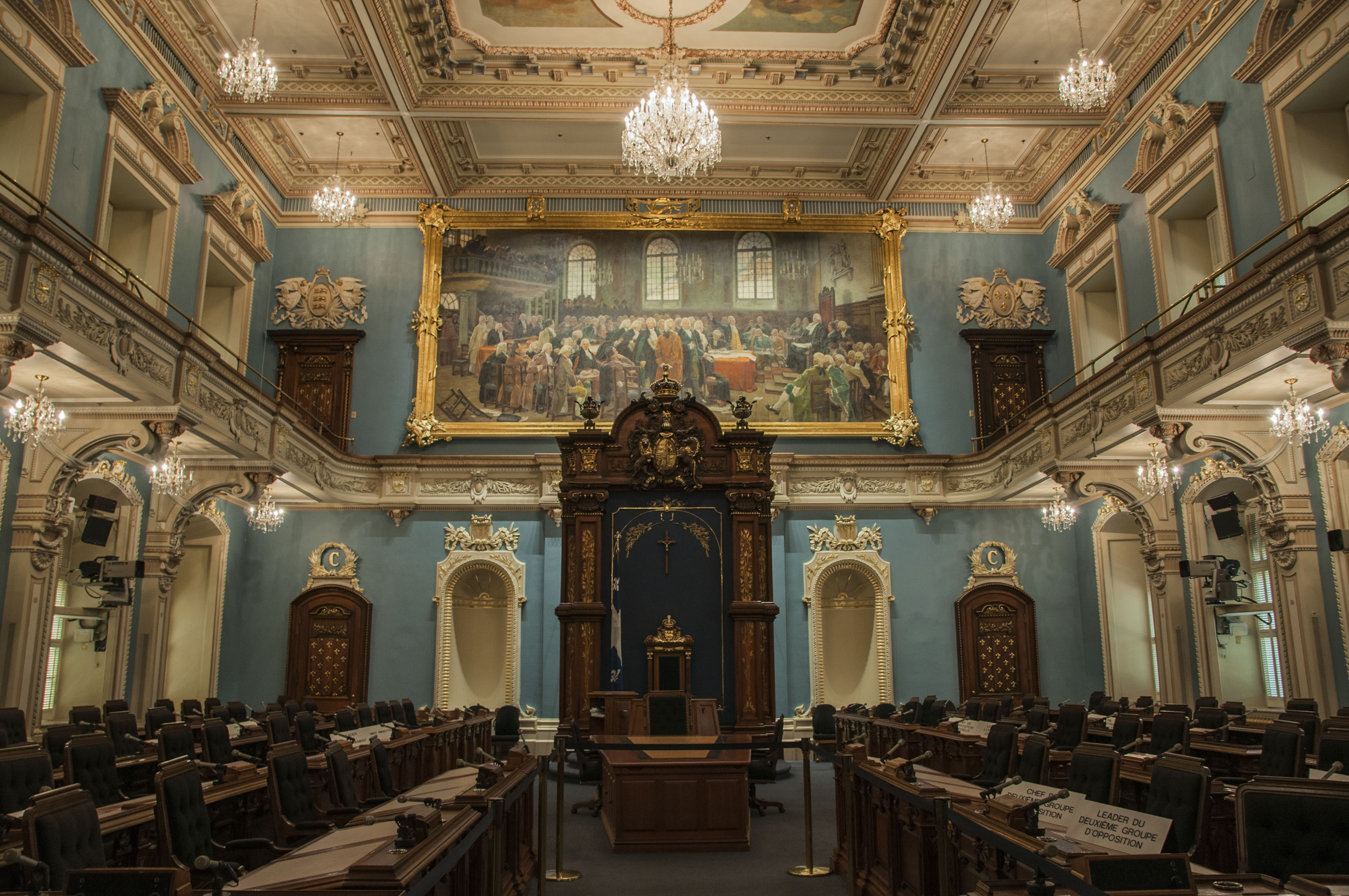
- Parliament Building, Quebec City, Quebec

Website
- assnat.qc.ca

The National Assembly of Quebec (French: Assemblée nationale du Québec, pronounced [asɑ̃ble nɑsjɔnal dy kebɛk]) is the legislative body of the province of Quebec in Canada. Legislators are known as MNAs (members of the National Assembly; French: députés). The lieutenant governor of Quebec (representing the King of Canada) and the National Assembly compose the Parliament of Quebec, which operates similarly to other Westminster-style parliamentary systems. The assembly has 127 members elected by first past the post in single-member districts.

The National Assembly was formerly the lower house of Quebec's legislature and was then called the Legislative Assembly of Quebec (French: Assemblée législative du Québec). In 1968, the upper house, the Legislative Council, was abolished and the remaining house was renamed. The office of President of the National Assembly is equivalent to that of a speaker in other legislatures. As of the 2026 general election, the Parti Québécois has a plurality of seats in the Assembly.

== History ==
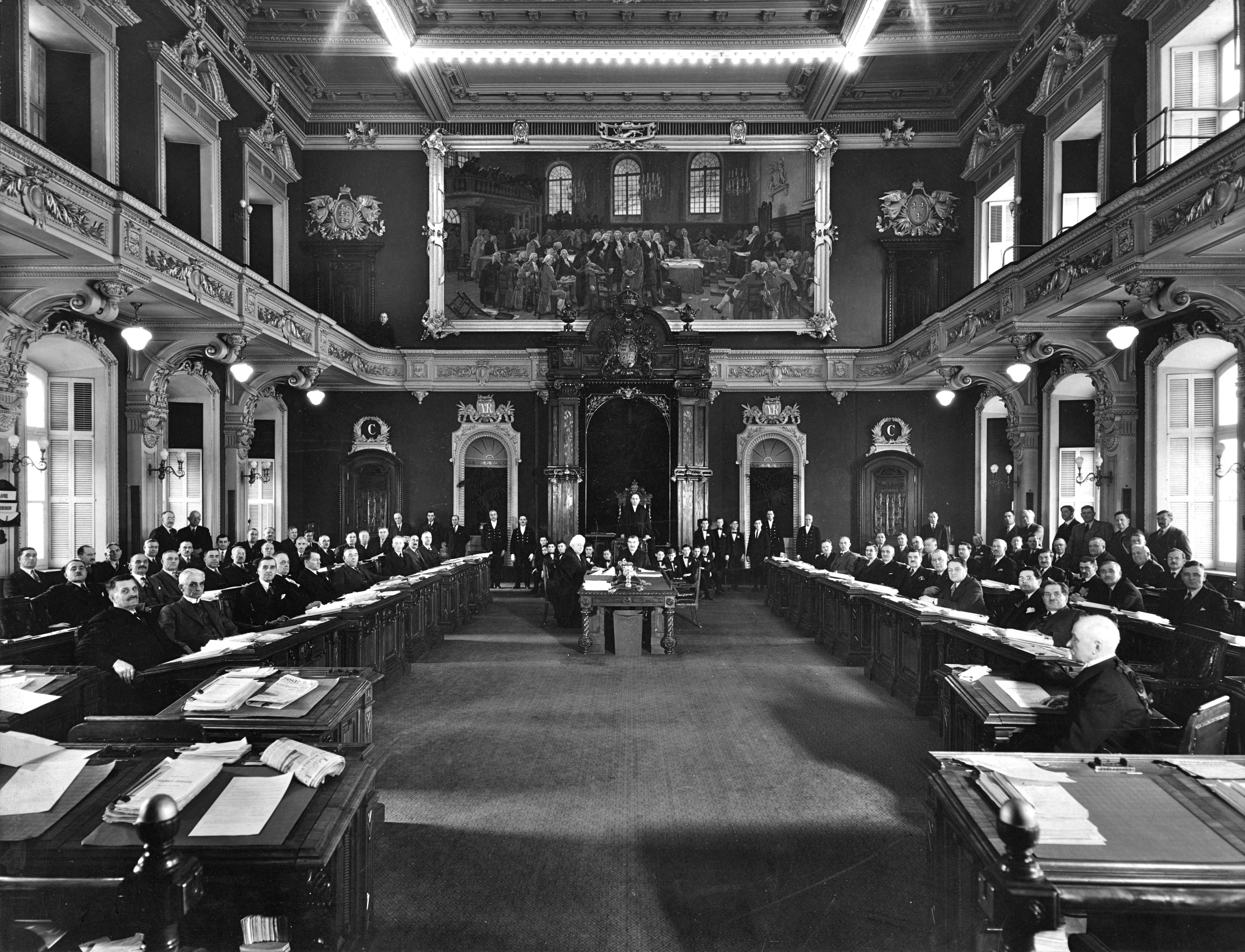
Quebec Legislative Assembly in 1933

The Constitutional Act 1791 created the Parliament of Lower Canada. It consisted of two chambers, the Legislative Council and the Legislative Assembly. That parliament and both chambers were abolished in 1841 when the Act of Union 1840 merged Upper Canada and Lower Canada into a single province named the Province of Canada. The Act of Union created a new Parliament of the Province of Canada, also composed of a Legislative Council and a Legislative Assembly. That Parliament had jurisdiction over the entire province, with members from Lower Canada and Upper Canada in both houses.

The Constitution Act, 1867 (formerly known as the British North America Act) created the Dominion of Canada and the provinces of Ontario and Quebec by dividing the former Province of Canada along the boundaries of Upper Canada and Lower Canada. The act created a new bicameral legislature for the province of Quebec, composed of the Legislative Council and the Legislative Assembly of Quebec.

In December 1955, the assembly passed a bill granting the title "Member of Provincial Parliament" (membre du Parlement provincial) and the initialism "MPP" (M.P.P.) to members of the legislature. Previously, members had no fixed designation but were often referred to as "Members of the Legislative Assembly" (MLAs) (membres de l'Assemblée législative (M.A.L.s)). In a speech on the bill, Premier Maurice Duplessis noted that the French initialism "can sometimes be pronounced as 'mal', which means 'evil' in French."

In 1961, Marie-Claire Kirkland became the first woman elected to the Legislative Assembly.

In 1968, the government of Premier Jean-Jacques Bertrand secured the passage of Bill 90, abolishing the Legislative Council and renaming the Legislative Assembly the "National Assembly", amid the political changes associated with the Quiet Revolution. Before 1968, several attempts to abolish the Legislative Council, which was analogous to the Senate of Canada, had failed. Following the name change, assembly members were designated Members of the National Assembly (MNAs) in English. In French, the terms used for members include membre de l'Assemblée nationale (M.A.N.) and députés de l'Assemblée nationale du Québec.

In 1978, television cameras were installed to broadcast parliamentary debates for the first time. The colour of the walls was changed to suit the needs of television, and the salon vert (green hall) became the salon bleu (blue hall).

In 1984, Canadian Forces corporal Denis Lortie stormed into the Parliament Building and opened fire, killing three government employees and wounding 13 others. His intended target was Premier René Lévesque and his Parti Québécois government. He arrived approximately 15 minutes early, when the Assembly chamber was still largely empty; no politicians were shot. He surrendered to police hours later.

== Parliament Building ==
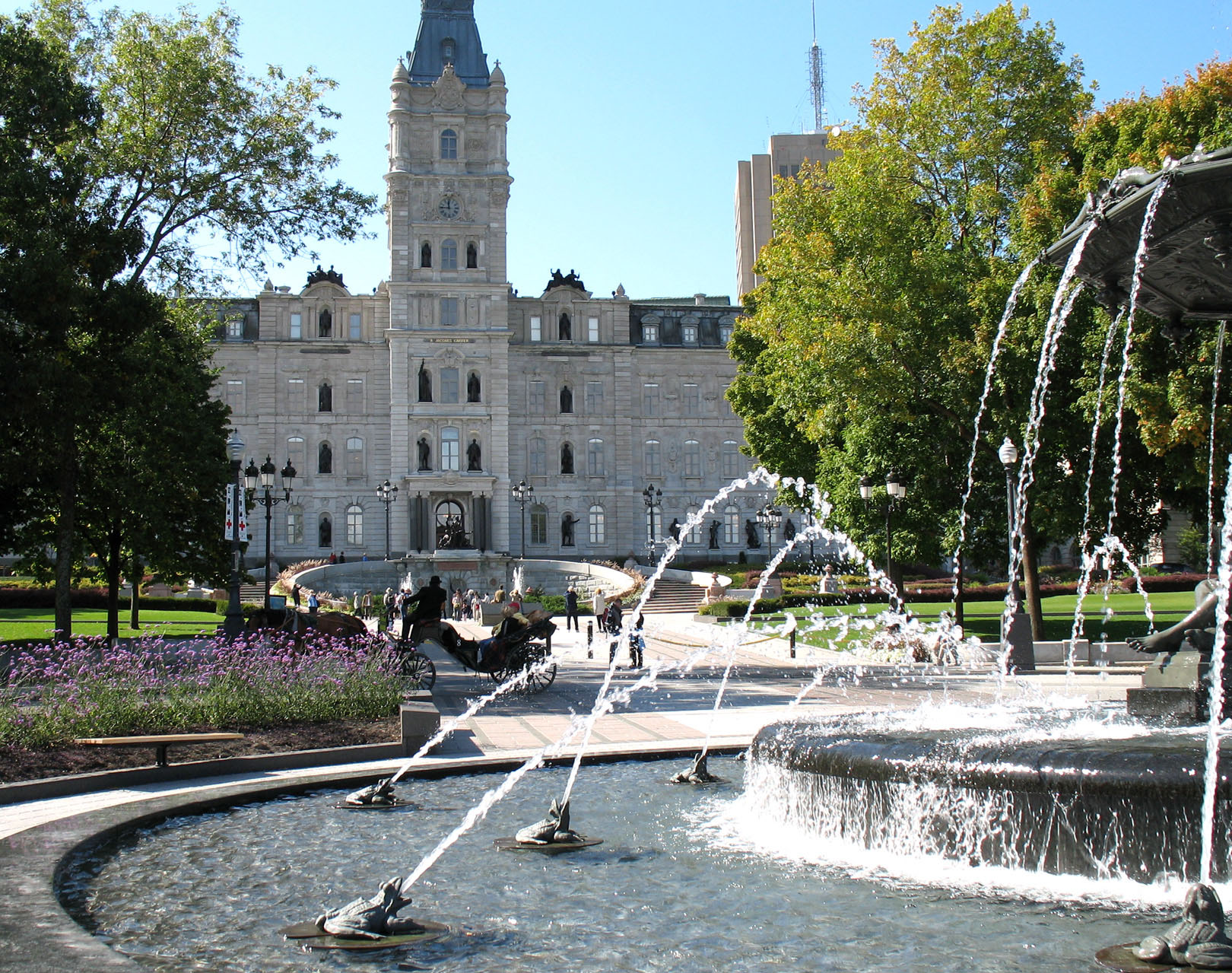
The Fontaine de Tourny east of the Parliament Building

Constructed between 1877 and 1886, the Parliament Building features the Second Empire architectural style which was popular for prominent buildings in Europe (particularly France, where it originated) and the United States in the late 19th century.

Quebec City's Parliament Building resembles Philadelphia City Hall, another Second Empire building in North America constructed during the same period, although it lacks Philadelphia City Hall's towering central belfry. Although the building's symmetrical layout, with a central clock tower, is typical of legislative buildings of British heritage, its architectural style differs from that of parliament buildings in other Canadian provincial capitals. Its façade features a pantheon depicting people and events from Quebec's history.

In 1936, Maurice Duplessis hung a crucifix in the Legislative Assembly chamber. It remained there for 83 years before being removed on July 10, 2019.

Additional buildings were constructed adjacent to the Parliament Building:

- Édifice André-Laurendeau was built between 1935 and 1937 to house the Ministry of Transport.
- Édifice Honoré-Mercier was built between 1922 and 1925 to accommodate the Treasury (Finance), the Attorney General's Office and the Office of the Secretary General of the National Assembly.
- Édifice Jean-Antoine-Panet was built between 1931 and 1932 to house the Ministry of Agriculture.
- Édifice Pamphile-Le May was built between 1910 and 1915 to house the Library of the National Assembly, various other government offices and the Executive Council.

== Elections ==
General elections are held at least once every four years. Since 2014, general elections have been scheduled at four-year intervals, with the election date set no later than "the first Monday of October of the fourth calendar year following the year that includes the last day of the previous Legislature." However, the lieutenant governor, acting on the advice of the premier, can dissolve the legislature and call an election earlier. Any Canadian citizen aged 18 or older who has resided in Quebec for at least six months is eligible to register on the electoral list.

Typically, the lieutenant governor invites the leader of the party holding the most seats in the National Assembly to form a government as premier (premier ministre in French; French does not distinguish between premier and prime minister).

Quebec's territory is divided into 125 electoral districts (ridings). In each riding, the candidate who receives the most votes is elected and becomes a member of the National Assembly (MNA). This is the first-past-the-post voting system. The system can produce disparities between a party's share of seats and its share of the popular vote, as illustrated by the 1966 (wrong-winner result), 1970 (false-majority result), 1973 and 1998 (wrong-winner and false-majority result) elections.

Elections in Quebec have also resulted in substantial changes in seat distribution since the 1970s. In some elections, established parties have lost more than half their seats as newer or opposition parties gained support. For instance, the 1970 and 1973 elections saw the decline of the Union Nationale and the rise of the Parti Québécois, which took power in 1976. In the 1985 and 1994 elections, the Liberals gained and lost power, respectively, following landslide results. In the 2018 election, the Coalition Avenir Québec formed the government for the first time.

== Members (2022–2026) ==
Cabinet ministers are shown in bold, party leaders in italics, and the president of the National Assembly with a †.

Name	Party	Riding	First elected / previously elected	No. of terms
Pierre Dufour	CAQ	Abitibi-Est	2018	2nd term
Pierre Dufour	Independent	Abitibi-Est	2018	2nd term
Suzanne Blais	CAQ	Abitibi-Ouest	2018	2nd term
André Morin	Liberal	Acadie	2022	1st term
Karine Boivin Roy	CAQ	Anjou–Louis-Riel	2022	1st term
Agnès Grondin	CAQ	Argenteuil	2018	2nd term
Éric Lefebvre	CAQ	Arthabaska	2016	3rd term
Éric Lefebvre	Independent	Arthabaska	2016	3rd term
Alex Boissonneault (since August 11, 2025)	Parti Québécois	Arthabaska	2025	1st term
Luc Provençal	CAQ	Beauce-Nord	2018	2nd term
Samuel Poulin	CAQ	Beauce-Sud	2018	2nd term
Claude Reid	CAQ	Beauharnois	2018	2nd term
Stéphanie Lachance	CAQ	Bellechasse	2018	2nd term
**Caroline Proulx**	CAQ	Berthier	2018	2nd term
**France-Élaine Duranceau**	CAQ	Bertrand	2022	1st term
Mario Laframboise	CAQ	Blainville	2014	3rd term
Catherine Blouin	CAQ	Bonaventure	2022	1st term
**Simon Jolin-Barrette**	CAQ	Borduas	2014	3rd term
Madwa-Nika Cadet	Liberal	Bourassa-Sauvé	2022	1st term
**Isabelle Charest**	CAQ	Brome-Missisquoi	2018	2nd term
Paul St-Pierre Plamondon	Parti Québécois	Camille-Laurin	2022	1st term
**Jean-François Roberge**	CAQ	Chambly	2014	3rd term
**Sonia LeBel**	CAQ	Champlain	2018	2nd term
Mathieu Lévesque	CAQ	Chapleau	2018	2nd term
**Jonatan Julien**	CAQ	Charlesbourg	2018	2nd term
Kariane Bourassa	CAQ	Charlevoix–Côte-de-Beaupré	2022	1st term
Marie-Belle Gendron	CAQ	Châteauguay	2022	1st term
Sylvain Lévesque	CAQ	Chauveau	2012, (Note: Vanier-Les Rivières) 2018	3rd term*
**Andrée Laforest** (until September 4, 2025)	CAQ	Chicoutimi	2018	2nd term
Marie-Karlynn Laflamme (since February 23, 2026)	Parti Québécois	Chicoutimi	2026	1st term
Sona Lakhoyan Olivier	Liberal	Chomedey	2022	1st term
Sona Lakhoyan Olivier	Independent	Chomedey	2022	1st term
**Martine Biron**	CAQ	Chutes-de-la-Chaudière	2022	1st term
Mathieu Rivest	CAQ	Côte-du-Sud	2022	1st term
Elisabeth Prass	Liberal	D'Arcy-McGee	2022	1st term
**Benoit Charette**	CAQ	Deux-Montagnes	2008, (Note: First elected as a PQ candidate) 2014	4th term*
Sébastien Schneeberger	CAQ	Drummond–Bois-Francs	2007, 2012	5th term*
François Tremblay	CAQ	Dubuc	2018	2nd term
François Tremblay	Independent	Dubuc	2018	2nd term
**Kateri Champagne Jourdain**	CAQ	Duplessis	2022	1st term
Alice Abou-Khalil	CAQ	Fabre	2022	1st term
Stéphane Sainte-Croix	CAQ	Gaspé	2022	1st term
Robert Bussière	CAQ	Gatineau	2018	2nd term
Gabriel Nadeau-Dubois	Québec solidaire	Gouin	2017	3rd term
**François Bonnardel**	CAQ	Granby	2007	6th term
**Eric Girard**	CAQ	Groulx	2018	2nd term
Alexandre Leduc	Québec solidaire	Hochelaga-Maisonneuve	2018	2nd term
Suzanne Tremblay	CAQ	Hull	2022	1st term
Carole Mallette	CAQ	Huntingdon	2022	1st term
Audrey Bogemans	CAQ	Iberville	2022	1st term
Joël Arseneau	Parti Québécois	Îles-de-la-Madeleine	2018	2nd term
Gregory Kelley	Liberal	Jacques-Cartier	2018	2nd term
Sol Zanetti	Québec solidaire	Jean-Lesage	2018	2nd term
Filomena Rotiroti	Liberal	Jeanne-Mance–Viger	2008	5th term
Joëlle Boutin (until July 19, 2023)	CAQ	Jean-Talon	2019	2nd term
Pascal Paradis (since October 2, 2023)	Parti Québécois	Jean-Talon	2023	1st term
**André Lamontagne**	CAQ	Johnson	2014	3rd term
François St-Louis	CAQ	Joliette	2022	1st term
Yannick Gagnon	CAQ	Jonquière	2022	1st term
Chantale Jeannotte	CAQ	Labelle	2018	2nd term
Éric Girard	CAQ	Lac-Saint-Jean	2018	2nd term
Marc Tanguay	Liberal	LaFontaine	2012	5th term
**Éric Caire**	CAQ	La Peltrie	2007	6th term
Linda Caron	Liberal	La Pinière	2022	1st term
Isabelle Poulet	CAQ	Laporte	2022	1st term
Isabelle Poulet	Independent	Laporte	2022	1st term
Christian Dubé	CAQ	La Prairie	2012, (Note: Lévis) 2018	3rd term*
Christian Dubé	Independent	La Prairie	2012, 2018	3rd term*
François Legault	CAQ	L'Assomption	1998, (Note: Rousseau (First elected as a PQ candidate)) 2012	8th term*
Andrés Fontecilla	Québec solidaire	Laurier-Dorion	2018	2nd term
Céline Haytayan	CAQ	Laval-des-Rapides	2022	1st term
Marie-Louise Tardif	CAQ	Laviolette–Saint-Maurice	2018	2nd term
Lucie Lecours	CAQ	Les Plaines	2018	2nd term
**Bernard Drainville**	CAQ	Lévis	2007, (Note: Marie-Victorin (First elected as a PQ candidate)) 2022	5th term*
Isabelle Lecours	CAQ	Lotbinière-Frontenac	2018	2nd term
**Geneviève Guilbault**	CAQ	Louis-Hébert	2017	3rd term
Fred Beauchemin	Liberal	Marguerite-Bourgeoys	2022	1st term
Shirley Dorismond	CAQ	Marie-Victorin	2022	2nd term
Enrico Ciccone	Liberal	Marquette	2018	2nd term
Simon Allaire	CAQ	Maskinongé	2018	2nd term
Mathieu Lemay	CAQ	Masson	2014	3rd term
Pascal Bérubé	Parti Québécois	Matane-Matapédia	2007	6th term
Haroun Bouazzi	Québec solidaire	Maurice-Richard	2022	1st term
François Jacques	CAQ	Mégantic	2018	2nd term
Ruba Ghazal	Québec solidaire	Mercier	2018	2nd term
Virginie Dufour	Liberal	Mille-Îles	2022	1st term
Sylvie D'Amours	CAQ	Mirabel	2014	3rd term
Nathalie Roy	CAQ	Montarville	2012	4th term
Jean-François Simard	CAQ	Montmorency	1998, (Note: First elected as a PQ candidate) 2018	3rd term*
Michelle Setlakwe	Liberal	Mont-Royal–Outremont	2022	1st term
Monsef Derraji	Liberal	Nelligan	2018	2nd term
Donald Martel	CAQ	Nicolet-Bécancour	2012	4th term
Désirée McGraw	Liberal	Notre-Dame-de-Grâce	2022	1st term
Gilles Bélanger	CAQ	Orford	2018	2nd term
Gilles Bélanger	Independent	Orford	2018	2nd term
**Mathieu Lacombe**	CAQ	Papineau	2018	2nd term
**Chantal Rouleau**	CAQ	Pointe-aux-Trembles	2018	2nd term
André Fortin	Liberal	Pontiac	2014	3rd term
Vincent Caron	CAQ	Portneuf	2018	2nd term
**Sonia Bélanger**	CAQ	Prévost	2022	1st term
Yves Montigny	CAQ	René-Lévesque	2022	1st term
**Pascale Déry**	CAQ	Repentigny	2022	1st term
Jean-Bernard Émond	CAQ	Richelieu	2018	2nd term
André Bachand	CAQ	Richmond	2018	2nd term
**Maïté Blanchette Vézina**	CAQ	Rimouski	2022	1st term
**Maïté Blanchette Vézina**	Independent	Rimouski	2022	1st term
**Maïté Blanchette Vézina**	PCQ	Rimouski	2022	1st term
Amélie Dionne	CAQ	Rivière-du-Loup–Témiscouata	2022	1st term
Brigitte Garceau	Liberal	Robert-Baldwin	2022	1st term
Nancy Guillemette	CAQ	Roberval	2018	2nd term
Vincent Marissal	Québec solidaire	Rosemont	2018	2nd term
Vincent Marissal	Independent	Rosemont	2018	2nd term
Louis-Charles Thouin	CAQ	Rousseau	2018	2nd term
Daniel Bernard	CAQ	Rouyn-Noranda–Témiscamingue	2003, (Note: First elected as a Liberal) 2008, (Note: Re-elected as a Liberal) 2022	3rd term*
Geneviève Hébert	CAQ	Saint-François	2018	2nd term
Dominique Anglade (until December 1, 2022)	Liberal	Saint-Henri–Sainte-Anne	2015	3rd term
Guillaume Cliche-Rivard (since March 13, 2023)	Québec solidaire	Saint-Henri–Sainte-Anne	2023	1st term
Chantal Soucy	CAQ	Saint-Hyacinthe	2014	3rd term
Louis Lemieux	CAQ	Saint-Jean	2018	2nd term
Youri Chassin	CAQ	Saint-Jérôme	2018	2nd term
Youri Chassin	Independent	Saint-Jérôme	2018	2nd term
Marwah Rizqy	Liberal	Saint-Laurent	2018	2nd term
Marwah Rizqy	Independent	Saint-Laurent	2018	2nd term
Manon Massé	Québec solidaire	Sainte-Marie–Saint-Jacques	2014	3rd term
**Christopher Skeete**	CAQ	Sainte-Rose	2018	2nd term
**Christine Fréchette**	CAQ	Sanguinet	2022	1st term
Christine Labrie	Québec solidaire	Sherbrooke	2018	2nd term
Marilyne Picard	CAQ	Soulanges	2018	2nd term
**Lionel Carmant**	CAQ	Taillon	2018	2nd term
**Lionel Carmant**	Independent	Taillon	2018	2nd term
**Lionel Carmant**	CAQ	Taillon	2018	2nd term
Étienne Grandmont	Québec solidaire	Taschereau	2022	1st term
**Pierre Fitzgibbon** (resigned on September 4)	CAQ	Terrebonne	2018	2nd term
Catherine Gentilcore (since March 17, 2025)	Parti Québécois	Terrebonne	2025	1st term
**Jean Boulet**	CAQ	Trois-Rivières	2018	2nd term
Denis Lamothe	CAQ	Ungava	2018	2nd term
**Ian Lafrenière**	CAQ	Vachon	2018	2nd term
Mario Asselin	CAQ	Vanier-Les Rivières	2018	2nd term
Marie-Claude Nichols	Liberal (until October 2022) (Note: Marie-Claude Nichols was elected as a Liberal candidate in Vaudreuil. She was expelled from the Liberal caucus on October 27 after declining the role of transport critic.)	Vaudreuil	2014	3rd term
Marie-Claude Nichols	Independent	Vaudreuil	2014	3rd term
Marie-Claude Nichols	Liberal	Vaudreuil	2014	3rd term
**Suzanne Roy**	CAQ	Verchères	2022	1st term
Alejandra Zaga Mendez	Québec solidaire	Verdun	2022	1st term
Frantz Benjamin	Liberal	Viau	2018	2nd term
Valérie Schmaltz	CAQ	Vimont	2022	1st term
Jennifer Maccarone	Liberal	Westmount–Saint-Louis	2018	2nd term

=== Changes during the 43rd Quebec Legislature ===
Number of members per party by date	2022			2023					2024			2025														2026				
Number of members per party by date	Oct 3	Oct 27	Dec 1	Mar 7	Mar 13	Mar 29	Jul 19	Oct 2	Apr 16	Sept 3	Sept 12	Mar 17	Mar 18	Jun 19	Aug 11	Sep 4	Sep 5	Sep 18	Oct 30	Nov 4	Nov 18	Nov 22	Dec 2	Dec 4	Dec 18	Jan 9	Feb 23	Mar 24	Apr 1	Apr 22
Coalition Avenir Québec	90			89		90	89		88	87	86		85			84	83		82	81					80	79			80	79
Liberal	21	20	19											20							19			18						
Québec solidaire	11				12																		11							
Parti Québécois	3							4				5			6												7			
Independent	0	1		2		1			2		3		2	1				2	3	4	5	6	7	8	9	10		9	8	9
Conservative	0																											1		
Vacant	0		1		0		1	0		1		0	1		0		1										0			

== Proceedings ==
The members of the National Assembly elect one of their own as President of the Assembly (known as the speaker in most other Westminster System legislatures). Any member of the assembly other than a party leader or cabinet minister is eligible to stand for election. The election is the first order of business for a newly elected assembly. Members vote by secret ballot, with successive rounds if necessary until one candidate receives a majority of the votes.

The president of the assembly presides over parliamentary debates between government and opposition members. Members must address their remarks to the assembly through the president. The president is usually a member of the governing party.

The proceedings of the National Assembly are broadcast across Quebec on the cable television network Canal de l'Assemblée nationale.

== See also ==
- Executive Council of Quebec
- List of Quebec general elections
- List of Quebec Legislatures
- List of Quebec premiers
- List of Quebec leaders of the Opposition
- Politics of Quebec
- Timeline of Quebec history
