= 20th-century municipal history of Quebec =

Aspect of Canadian history

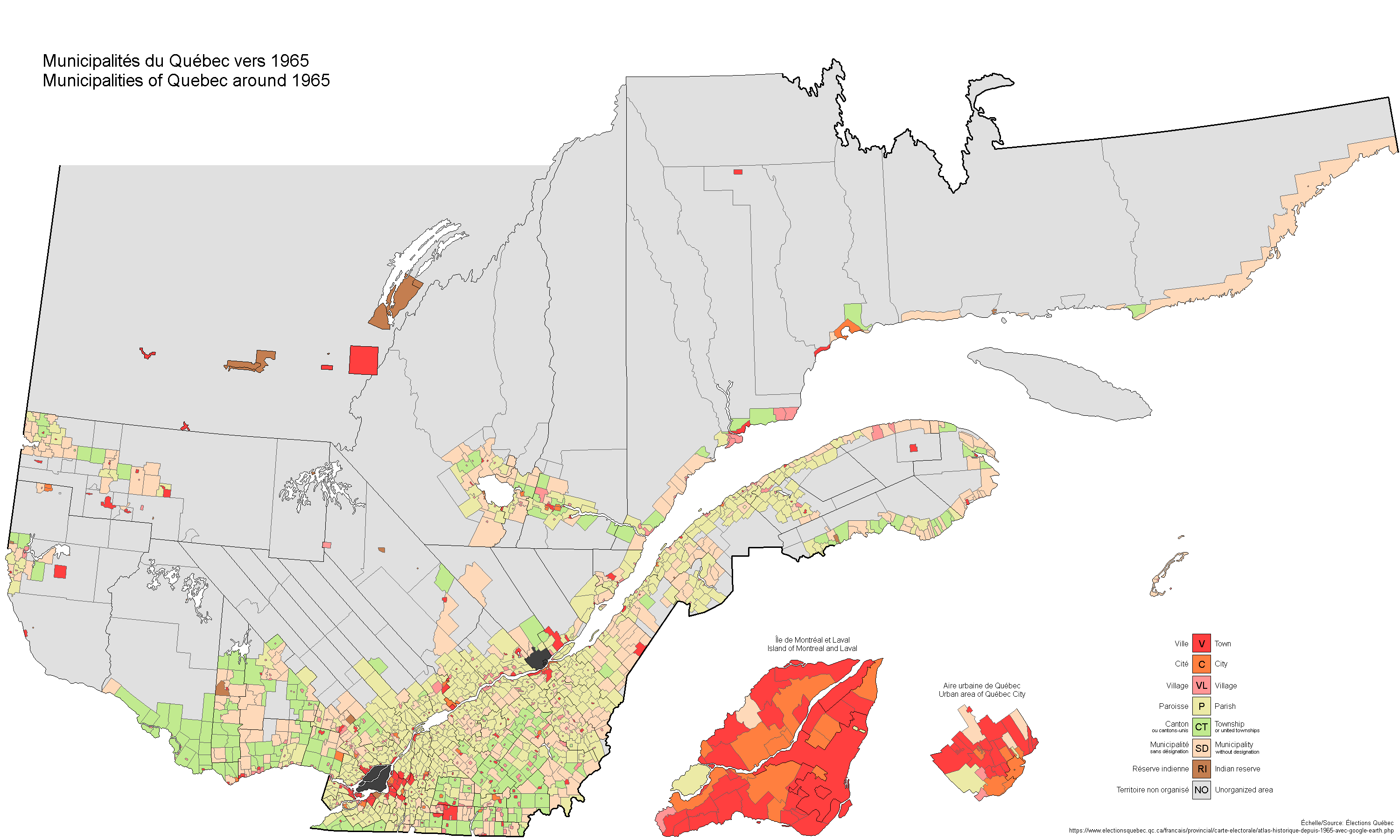
Municipalities of Quebec around 1965

The municipal history of Quebec started in 1796 with the creation of administrations for Montréal and Quebec City, but was abolished and replaced in September 1847 by a system of county municipalities, whose councillors were elected from the parishes and townships existing therein, with provision for the creation of towns and villages that would be separated from their counties. Further reform came into effect in July 1855 for all parts of Lower Canada other than Montreal, Quebec City and Saint-Hyacinthe, which included provision for the creation of local councils for parishes and townships, the representation of towns and villages on county councils, and the formation of towns and villages by order in council upon the recommendation of the relevant county council. The municipal law of Lower Canada was consolidated into a single Act in 1860.

For more than a century localities changed little. During the 20th century, there were no major reorganizations in the municipal history of Quebec, with the notable exceptions of Montréal (1910), Laval (1965), Bécancour (1965) Gaspé (1971), Mirabel (1971), Percé (1971), Buckingham (1975), Gatineau (1975), La Pêche (1975), Beauport (1976), and La Malbaie (1999).

Municipalities written in bold are on their current form.

== 20th century ==
=== 1900 ===
- 8 January: Creation of the Township of Campbell.
- 13 January: Creation of the United Townships of Woburn-et-Louise from territories taken from the Municipality of Linière.
- 9 March: Creation of the Parish of L’Enfant-Jésus from territories taken from the Parish of Saint-Joseph-de-la-Beauce and the Parish of Sainte-Marie-de-la-Nouvelle-Beauce.
- 10 April: Creation of the Village of Gentilly from territories taken from the Parish of Saint-Edouard-de-Gentilly.
- 11 April: The Municipality of Linière is split into the Township of Marlow and the United Townships of Risborough-et-Marlow.
- 27 July: Creation of the Village of Inverness from territories taken from the Municipality of Inverness.
- 31 October: Creation of the Parish of Cœur-Très-Pur-de-la-Bienheureuse-Vierge-Marie-de-Plaisance from territories taken from the Parish of Sainte-Angélique.

=== 1901 ===
- 16 January: Creation of the United Townships of Wurtele-Moreau-et-Gravel.
- 21 January: Creation of the Parish of Saint-Louis-de-Pintendre from territories taken from the Parish of Notre-Dame-de-la-Victoire, the Parish of Pointe-Lévi and the Parish of Saint-Henri.
- 18 March: Creation of the Parish of Saint-Jacques-de-Parisville from territories taken from the Parish of Saint-Jean-Deschaillons.
- 22 March: Creation of the Parish of Sainte-Germaine-de-l’Anse-aux-Gascons from territories taken from the Municipality of Partie-Est-du-Township-de-Port-Daniel.
- 28 March:
  - Creation of the Municipality of **Sainte-Catherine-de-Hatley** from territories taken from the Township of **Hatley**.
  - The Village of Grand-Mère became a Town.
- 18 April: Creation of the Village of Shawinigan-Falls from territories taken from the Parish of Sainte-Flore and the Township of Shawenegan.
- 13 July:
  - The Parish of Saint-Jean-Deschaillons is annexed by the Village of Deschaillons.
  - Creation of the Parish of **Saint-Majorique-de-Grantham** from territories taken from the Township of Grantham.
- 23 July: Creation of the Municipality of Saint-André.
- 2 October: Creation of the Village of Villers from territories taken from the Parish of Saint-Edouard-de-Gentilly.
- 13 November: Creation of the Village of Daveluyville from territories taken from the Parish of Sainte-Anne-du-Sault.

=== 1902 ===
- 11 January: Creation of the Township of Maddington from territories taken from the Parish of Sainte-Anne-du-Sault.
- 19 March: Creation of the Village of Saint-Guillaume from territories taken from the Parish of Saint-Guillaume.
- 26 March:
  - Creation of the Municipality of Anticosti.
  - The Municipality of Saint-Malo is split into the Municipality of Petite-Rivière and the Village of Saint-Malo.
  - The Village of Shawinigan-Falls became a Town.
- 18 April: Creation of the Village of Montmorency from territories taken from the Municipality of Beauport.
- 30 April: Creation of the Village of Contrecoeur from territories taken from the Municipality of Contrecoeur.
- 9 May: Creation of the Municipality of Musselyville from territories taken from the Parish of Saint-Bonaventure-de-Hamilton and the Township of New Richmond.
- 28 May: Creation of the Village of Labelle from territories taken from the Township of Joly.
- 10 June: Creation of the Village of Saint-Chrysostome from territories taken from the Parish of Saint-Jean-Chrysostome.
- 12 September: Creation of the United Townships of Sainte-Anne-de-Portneuf from territories taken from the Township of Saint-Paul-de-Mille-Vaches.
- 3 October: Creation of the Parish of Notre-Dame-de-la-Paix from territories taken from the Parish of Notre-Dame-de-Bonsecours and the Parish of Saint-André-Avellin.
- 13 October: The Parish of Côte-Saint-Paul became the Village of Boulevard-Saint-Paul.
- 20 October: Creation of the Municipality of Saint-Ambroise from territories taken from the Township of Bourget.
- 22 October: Creation of the Village of Brompton-Falls from territories taken from the Township of Brompton.
- 5 December: The Township of Broughton became the Parish of **Sacré-Cœur-de-Jésus**.
- 19 December: Creation of the Village of Laurierville from territories taken from the Township of Somerset-Nord.

=== 1903 ===
- 15 January: Creation of the Municipality of Saint-Amédée from territories taken from the Municipality of Saint-Michel-de-Mistassini.
- 22 January: Creation of the Village of Chénéville from territories taken from the United Townships of Hartwell-et-Preston.
- 18 February: Creation of the Village of Hébertville-Station from territories taken from the Municipality of **Hébertville**.
- 25 March: Creation of the Village of **Massueville** from territories taken from the Parish of Saint-Aimé.
- 25 April:
  - Creation of the Municipality of **Saint-Herménégilde** from territories taken from the Township of Barford and the Township of Hereford.
  - The Village of Arthabaskaville became the Town of Arthabaska.
  - The Village of Brompton-Falls became the Town of Bromptonville.
  - Creation of the Village of Côte-Saint-Luc from territories taken from the Village of Notre-Dame-de-Grâce-Ouest.
  - The Village of **Roberval** became a Town.
- 9 May: Creation of the Township of Pohénégamook.
- 29 May: Creation of the Village of Andréville from territories taken from the Parish of Saint-André.
- 29 June: Creation of the Parish of Notre-Dame-du-Perpétuel-Secours-de-Charny from territories taken from the Parish of Saint-Jean-Chrysostome.
- 1 July: The Village of **Dorval** became a Town.
- 12 August:
  - Creation of the Municipality of Saint-Edmond from territories taken from the Parish of Saint-Benoît-Joseph-Labre.
  - Creation of the Municipality of **Saint-Henri-de-Taillon**.
  - Creation of the Municipality of Saint-Léon-le-Grand.
- 22 October: Creation of the Village of Chesterville from territories taken from the Township of Chester-Ouest.
- 4 November: Creation of the Municipality of Saint-Firmin from territories taken from the Municipality of Tadoussac.
- 26 November:
  - Creation of the Municipality of Saint-Hubert-de-Spaulding from territories taken from the United Townships of Spaulding and Ditchfield.
  - Creation of the Village of Saint-Denis from territories taken from the Parish of Saint-Denis.
- 9 December: Creation of the Village of Beloeil from territories taken from the Parish of Saint-Mathieu de Beloeil.

=== 1904 ===
- 4 January: Creation of the Parish of Saint-Louis from territories taken from the Parish of **Saint-Maurice**.
- 15 January: Creation of the Village of Saint-Pie from territories taken from the Parish of Saint-Pie.
- 1 February: Creation of the Township of Turgeon.
- 5 February: Creation of the United Townships Laverlochère-et-Baby from territories taken from the Township of Duhamel and other unorganized territories.
- 19 February: Creation of the Township of Lussier.
- 23 February: Creation of the Village of Campbell's Bay from territories taken from the Township of Litchfield.
- 1 March: The Township of Tessier became the Parish of Saint-Luc.
- 15 March: Creation of the Township of Maniwaki.
- 6 April: Creation of the Parish of Courcelles from territories taken from the Municipality of Lambton, the Municipality of Saint-Évariste-de-Forsyth and the Township of Aylmer.
- 13 April: Creation of the Parish of Saint-Timothée from territories taken from the Parish of Saint-Jacques-des-Piles, the Parish of **Saint-Narcisse** and the Parish of Saint-Tite.
- 20 April: Creation of the Municipality of Saint-Charles-de-Mandeville from territories taken from the Parish of **Saint-Didace**.
- 25 April: Creation of the Village of Sainte-Geneviève-de-Pierrefonds from territories taken from the Village of Sainte-Geneviève.
- 6 May: Creation of the Village of Pontgravé from territories taken from the Municipality of Chénier.
- 31 May: The Town of **Salaberry-de-Valleyfield** became a City.
- 2 June: Creation of the Town of **Beauceville** from territories taken from the Parish of Saint-François.
- 15 June: Creation of the Village of Saint-Ambroise from territories taken from the Parish of Saint-Ambroise.
- 5 July: Creation of the Township of Arago from territories taken from the Parish of **Saint-Cyrille-de-Lessard**.
- 13 July: Creation of the Township of Letellier.
- 17 August:
  - Creation of the Village of Saint-Dominique-de-Jonquière from territories taken from the Parish of Saint-Dominique-de-Jonquières.
  - Creation of the Parish of Très-Précieux-Sang-de-Notre-Seigneur from territories taken from the Municipality of **Saint-Célestin**, the Parish of Bécancour and the Parish of Saint-Grégoire-le-Grand.
- 10 September: Creation of the Parish of Saint-Elzéar-de-Laval from territories taken from the Municipality of Saint-Vincent-de-Paul, the Parish of Saint-Martin and the Parish of Sainte-Rose-de-Lima.
- 15 September: Creation of the Village of Nominingue from territories taken from the Township of Loranger.
- 15 November: Creation of the Township of Fabre.
- 19 November: Creation of the Village of D'Israëli from territories taken from the Municipality of D'Israëli.

=== 1905 ===
- 1 January: Creation of the Municipality of Gayhurst from territories taken from the Township of Gayhurst.
- 17 February: Creation of the Village of Gracefield from territories taken from the Township of Wright.
- 20 March: Creation of the Municipality of Partie-Est-du-Canton-de-Stukely-Nord from territories taken from the Township of North Stukely.
- 20 April: Creation of the Village of **Lawrenceville** from territories taken from the Township of North Stukely.
- 22 April: Creation of the Village of Saint-Jean-Baptiste-de-la-Pointe-aux-Trembles from territories taken from the Parish of Pointe-aux-Trembles.
- 20 May:
  - The Village of Kingsville became the Town of **Thetford Mines**.
  - The Village of **Marieville** became a Town.
  - The Village of Petite-Côte changed its name to Rosemont.
- 11 July: Creation of the Village of Saint-Félicien from territories taken from the Municipality of Saint-Félicien.
- 6 September: Creation of the Village of Saint-Cyrille from territories taken from the United Townships of Wendover-et-Simpson.
- 11 September: The Village of Villeray is annexed by the City of **Montréal**.
- 23 September:
  - Creation of the Parish of L'Ascension.
  - Creation of the Township of Taché from territories taken from the Township of Bourget.
- 30 October: The City of Saint-Henri is annexed by the City of **Montréal**.
- 2 November: Creation of the Parish of **Saint-Roch-de-Mékinac** from territories taken from the Parish of Saint-Jacques-des-Piles, the Parish of Saint-Jean-des-Piles and other unorganized territories.
- 4 November: Creation of the Parish of Saint-Laurent-de-Matapédia from territoires taken from the Township of Matapédia.
- 25 November: Creation of the Village of Lac-au-Saumon from territories taken from the Municipality of Saint-Edmond.
- 4 December: The City of Sainte-Cunégonde-de-Montréal is annexed by the City of **Montréal**.

=== 1906 ===
- 9 January: Creation of the Village of Montréal-Sud from territories taken from the Parish of Longueuil.
- 16 January: Creation of the Municipality of Portland from territories taken from the Township of Portland.
- 23 January: Creation of the Parish of Saint-Gérard-Magella from territories taken from the Parish of L'Assomption.
- 9 March:
  - The Village of Notre-Dame-de-Grâces-Ouest became the Town of Notre-Dame-de-Grâces.
  - The Village of Saint-Joseph-de-Bordeaux changed its name to Bordeaux.
  - Creation of the Parish of Saint-Nazaire-de-Dorchester from territories taken from the Parish of **Saint-Léon-de-Standon** and the Parish of Saint-Malachie-de-Frampton.
- 15 March: Creation of the Village of Cartier-Ville from territories taken from the Parish of Saint-Laurent.
- 16 March: Creation of the Parish of Saint-Félicien-Partie-Nord-Ouest from territories taken from the Municipality of Saint-Félicien.
- 11 May: Creation of the Village of Sainte-Anne-de-Beaupré from territories taken from the Parish of Sainte-Anne-Côte-Beaupré.
- 13 June: The Parish of Sainte-Anne-Côte-Beaupré is annexed by the Village of Sainte-Anne-de-Beaupré.
- 30 June: Creation of the Municipality of Partie-Sud-Est-du-Canton-de-Restigouche from territories taken from the Township of Ristigouche.
- 2 October: Creation of the Village of Saint-Moïse from territories taken from the Parish of **Saint-Moïse**.
- 10 October: Creation of the Township of Dorion.
- 13 November: Creation of the Village of Laurier from territories taken from the Parish of Saint-Paul-l’Ermite.
- 19 November: Creation of the Village of Lac-Noir from territories taken from the Parish of Saint-Désiré-du-Lac-Noir.
- 28 November: Creation of the Village of Saint-Benoît-Joseph-Labre from territories taken from the Parish of Saint-Benoît-Joseph-Labre.

=== 1907 ===
- 18 February: Creation of the Parish of **Saint-Gérard-Majella** from territories taken from the Parish of Saint-David, the Parish of Saint-François-du-Lac, the Parish of Saint-Michel-d’Yamaska and the Parish of **Saint-Pie-de-Guire**.
- 6 March: Creation of the Township of Montcalm from territories taken from the Township of **Harrington**.
- 14 March:
  - Creation of the Town of Mégantic by the merger of the Village of Agnès and the Village of Mégantic.
  - The Village of Bordeaux became a Town.
  - The Village of Verdun became a Town.
  - The Parish of Longue-Pointe is split into the Town of Longue-Pointe and the Village of Tétreaultville-de-Montréal.
- 21 March: The Village of Notre-Dame-des-Neiges-Ouest became the Town of Côte-des-Neiges.
- 26 March: Creation of the Parish of **Saint-Fabien-de-Panet** from territories taken from the Township of Montminy and the Township of Talon.
- 19 April: The Village of Laurier changed its name to Charlemagne.
- 26 April: Creation of the Parish of Saint-Léon-de-Marston.
- 1 May: Creation of the Village of Saint-Joseph from territories taken from the Parish of Saint-Joseph.
- 20 July: Creation of the Municipality of Est-du-Canton-Armagh from territories taken from the Parish of Saint-Cajetan-d’Armagh.
- 2 August: Creation of the Parish of Saint-Mathias-de-Cabano from territories taken from the Parish of Notre-Dame-du-Lac, the Parish of **Saint-Louis-du-Ha! Ha!** and other unorganized territories.
- 27 August: Creation of the Village of Baie-de-Shawenegan from territories taken from the Parish of Sainte-Flore and the Township of Shawenegan.
- 30 August: Creation of the Village of Baieville from territories taken from the Parish of Saint-Antoine-de-la-Baie-du-Febvre.
- 16 September: Creation of the Township of Natashquan.
- 10 October: Creation of the Municipality of Nouvelle-et-Shoolbred from territories taken from the Municipality of Shoolbred.
- 5 November: Creation of the Village of Coteau-du-Lac from territories taken from the Parish of Saint-Ignace-du-Coteau-du-Lac.
- 11 November Creation of the Parish of Saint-Lucien from territories taken from the Municipality of Kingsey and the United Townships of Wendover-et-Simpson.
- 12 December: Creation of the Village of Est-de-Saint-Georges-de-Beauce from territories taken from the Parish of Saint-Georges.

=== 1908 ===
- 1 January: The Village of Pontgravé is annexed by the Municipality of Chénier.
- 2 April: The Municipality of **Saint-Léon-le-Grand** became a Parish.
- 14 April:
  - The Town of Acton changed its name to **Acton Vale**.
  - The Village of Saint-Malo is annexed by **Quebec City**.
- 25 April:
  - The Town of Notre-Dame-des-Neiges is annexed by the City of **Montréal**.
  - The Town of **Westmount** became a City.
  - The Municipality of Limoilou became a Town.
  - Creation of the Municipality of Saint-Octave-de-Métis-Sud from territories taken from the Parish of Saint-Octave-de-Métis.
  - The Village of Boulevard-Saint-Paul became the Town of Ville-Émard.
  - The Village of Lac-Noir became the Town of Black Lake.
  - The Village of Saint-Pierre-aux-Liens became the Town of Ville-Saint-Pierre.
  - The Parish of Quebec became the Town of Montcalm.
- 20 May: Creation of the Village of Saint-Alexis-de-la-Grande-Baie from territories taken from the Municipality of Grande-Baie.
- 26 August: Creation of the Parish of **Sainte-Sabine** from territories taken from the United Townships of Roux-Bellechasse-et-Daaquam.
- 31 August: Creation of the Parish of Saint-Bernard from territories taken from the Municipality of Saint-Ours and the Parish of Saint-Denis.
- 11 September: Creation of the Parish of Sainte-Cécile from territories taken from the Parish of Saint-Pierre-les-Becquets.
- 19 September: Creation of the Municipality of **Péribonka** from territories taken from the Municipality of Saint-Amédée.
- 8 October: Creation of the Village of Annonciation from territories taken from the Township of Marchand.
- 17 October: The Parish of Saint-Désiré-du-Lac-Noir became the Municipality of **Saint-Joseph-de-Coleraine**.
- 27 October: Creation of the Village of Sacré-Cœur-de-Jésus from territories taken from the Parish of **Sacré-Cœur-de-Jésus**.
- 20 November: Creation of the Parish of Saint-Joseph-de-Blandford from territories taken from the Parish of **Sainte-Sophie-de-Lévrard**.
- 2 December: Creation of the Municipality of Templeton-Nord from territories taken from the Municipality of Templeton-Est and the Municipality of Templeton-Ouest.

=== 1909 ===
- 4 January: Creation of the Parish of **Notre-Dame-du-Sacré-Cœur-d’Issoudun** from territories taken from the Parish of Saint-Antoine-de-Tilly, the Parish of Saint-Apollinaire, the Parish of **Saint-Édouard-de-Lotbinière**, the Parish of Saint-Flavien and the Parish of Sainte-Croix.
- 23 January: Creation of the Village of Bécancourt from territories taken from the Parish of Bécancour.
- 27 January: Creation of the Village of Shawbridge from territories taken from the Municipality of Saint-Jérôme, the Parish of Saint-Sauveur and the Township of Abercrombie.
- 1 February: Creation of the Township of Lytton.
- 4 February: Creation of the Village of **Ayer's Cliff** from territories taken from the Township of **Hatley**.
- 11 February: Creation of the Parish of Sainte-Hélène-de-Breakeyville from territories taken from the Parish of Saint-Jean-Chrysostome.
- 27 February: Creation of the Township of **Nédélec**.
- 1 March: The United Townships of Woburn-et-Louise became the Parish of **Saint-Augustin-de-Woburn**.
- 9 March: Creation of the Village of Saint-Hugues from territories taken from the Parish of Saint-Hugues.
- 10 March: Creation of the Municipality of Sainte-Edwidge from territories taken from the Municipality of Roberval.
- 3 April: Creation of the Municipality of Metgermette-Nord from territories taken from the Township of Metgermette-Nord.
- 27 April: Creation of the Village of Sainte-Thècle from territories taken from the Parish of Sainte-Thècle.
- 7 May:
  - The Town of Lachine became a City.
  - The Village of Laprairie-de-la-Magdeleine became the Town of **La Prairie**.
  - Creation of the Parish of Saint-Gérard-Magella from territories taken from the Parish of Ancienne-Lorette and the Parish of Saint-Ambroise.
- 29 May: The Village of Lorimier is annexed by the City of **Montréal**.
- 26 July: Creation of the Village of Laval from territories taken from the Parish of Sainte-Angèle-de-Laval.
- 27 July: Creation of the Village of Robertsonville from territories taken from the Municipality of Nord-du-Canton-de-Thetford.
- 30 August: The Municipality of Sainte-Edwidge became the Parish of Sainte-Hedwige.
- 9 September: Creation of the Village of La Tuque.
- 30 September: Creation of the Parish of **Saint-Jacques-le-Majeur-de-Wolfestown** from territories taken from the Township of Leeds and the Township of Wolfestown.
- 14 October: Creation of the Village of Mont-Laurier from territories taken from the Township of Campbell.
- 22 October: Creation of the Parish of Notre-Dame-des-Laurentides from territories taken from the Parish of Charlesbourg.
- 14 December: Creation of the Parish of **Sainte-Apolline-de-Patton** from territories taken from the Municipality of **Cap-Saint-Ignace**.
- 30 December: The Town of Limoilou is annexed by **Quebec City**.
- 31 December: The Town of Saint-Louis is annexed by the City of **Montréal**.

=== 1910 ===
- 1 January: The Municipality of Nord-du-Canton-de-Thetford is split into the Parish of Saint-Antoine-de-Pontbriand and a section of the Parish of Sacré-Cœur-de-Marie.
  - Creation of the Parish of Sacré-Cœur-de-Marie from territories taken from the Municipality of Sud-du-Canton-de-Thetford and the former Municipality of Nord-du-Canton-de-Thetford.
- 2 February: Creation of the Village of Tuque Falls.
- 15 March: Creation of the Village of Saint-Bruno from territories taken from the Municipality of Saint-Bruno.
- 11 April: Creation of the Village of Sault-au-Récollet from territories taken from the Parish of La Visitation-du-Sault-au-Récollet.
- 4 June:
  - The Town of Bordeaux, the Town of Côte-des-Neiges, the Town of Longue-Pointe, the Town of Notre-Dame-de-Grâce, the Town of Saint-Paul, the Town of Ville-Émard, the Village of Ahuntsic, the Village of Beaurivage-de-la-Longue-Pointe, the Village of Rosemont and the Village of Tétreaultville-de-Montréal are annexed by the City of **Montréal**.
  - The Town of Fraserville became a City.
  - Creation of the Town of **Montréal-Est** from territories taken from the Parish of Pointe-aux-Trembles.
  - Creation of the Town of **Saint-Tite** from territories taken from the Parish of Saint-Tite.
  - Creation of the Municipality of Saint-Isidore-d'Auckland from territories taken from the Township of Auckland.
  - Creation of the Parish of Brébeuf from territories taken from the Township of **Amherst** and the United Townships of DeSalaberry-et-Grandison.
- 30 June: Creation of the Town of **Beaconsfield** from territories taken from the Municipality of Pointe-Claire.
- 4 August: Creation of the Parish of Saint-Gabriel-Archange.
- 3 November: The Village of Lauzon became a Town.

=== 1911 ===
- 4 January: Creation of the Village of Saint-Siméon from territories taken from the Parish of Saint-Siméon.
- 5 January: Creation of the Parish of **Saint-Eusèbe**.
- 31 January: Creation of the Parish of Saint-Antoine-de-Padoue-de-Kempt from territories taken from the Village of Saint-Moïse, the Parish of Saint-Octave-de-Métis and the Parish of Sainte-Angèle-de-Mérici.
- 20 February: Creation of the Parish of Notre-Dame-de-Lourdes-de-Lorrainville from territories taken from the Township of Duhamel and the United Townships of Laverlochère-et-Baby.
- 14 March:
  - The Village of Montréal-Sud became a Town.
  - The Village of Saint-Joachim-de-la-Pointe-Claire became the Town of **Pointe-Claire**.
- 24 March:
  - Creation of the Town of Greenfield-Park from territories taken from the Parish of Longueuil.
  - Creation of the Town of **La Tuque** by the merger of the Village of La Tuque and the Village of Tuque Falls.
  - The Municipality of Est-du-Canton-Armagh changed its name to **Sainte-Euphémie-sur-Rivière-du-Sud**.
  - The Village of Rigaud became a Town.
  - Creation of the Township of Boyer.
- 12 April: Creation of the Municipality of Sainte-Florence-de-Beaurivage.
- 30 June: Creation of the Town of Baie-d’Urfée from territories taken from the Town of **Sainte-Anne-de-Bellevue**.
- 10 August: Creation of the Village of Saint-Agapitville from territories taken from the Parish of Saint-Agapit-de-Beaurivage.
- 26 August: Creation of the United Townships of Casgrain-et-Leverrier from territories taken from the Municipality of Saint-Pamphile.
- 19 September: Creation of the Village of Sainte-Jeanne-de-Neuville from territories taken from the Parish of Sainte-Jeanne-de-Neuville.
- 12 October:
  - The Municipality of Shenley-Dorset-Jersey-et-Marlow became the Parish of **Saint-Martin**.
  - The Township of Marlow became the Parish of Saint-Gédéon.
- 8 November: Creation of the Township of **Guérin**.
- 29 November: Creation of the Village of Saint-André-Avellin from territories taken from the Parish of Saint-André-Avellin.
- 12 December: Creation of the Village of Bonsecours from territories taken from the Municipality of Islet.
- 23 December: Creation of the Parish of Sainte-Croix from territories taken from the Municipality of **Hébertville** and the Parish of Saint-Jérôme.

=== 1912 ===
- 1 January:
  - Creation of the Parish of **Notre-Dame-des-Sept-Douleurs** from territories taken from the Municipality of Isle-Verte and the Municipality of Kakonna.
  - Creation of the Township of Est-du-Canton-de-Campbell from territories taken from the Township of Campbell.
- 24 January: Creation of the Village of Hatley from territories taken from the Township of **Hatley**.
- 7 February: Creation of the Village of Bel-Air from territories taken from the Municipality of Saint-Eustache.
- 14 March:
  - Creation of the Town of **East Angus** from territories taken from the Township of **Westbury**.
  - The Town of **Thetford Mines** became a City.
  - The Parish of Saint-Dunstan-du-Lac-de-Beauport changed its name to Saint-Dunstan-du-Lac-Beauport.
  - The Parish of Saints-Anges-de-Lachine became the Town of Ville-Lasalle.
- 18 March:
  - Creation of the Village of Almaville from territories taken from the Parish of **Notre-Dame-du-Mont-Carmel**.
  - The Village of Saint-Dominique-de-Jonquière became the Town of Jonquière.
- 30 March: Creation of the Parish of **Saint-Léandre** from territories taken from the Parish of Saint-Ulric.
- 3 April:
  - Creation of the Town of Laval-des-Rapides from territories taken from the Parish of Saint-Martin.
  - Creation of the Municipality of **Ivry-sur-le-Lac** from territories taken from the Parish of Sainte-Agathe and the Township of Wolfe.
  - Creation of the Municipality of Saint-Pierre-de-Véronne-à-Pike-River from territories taken from the Municipality of **Stanbridge Station**, the Parish of Notre-Dame-de-Stanbridge, the Parish of Saint-Georges-de-Clarenceville and the Parish of Saint-Sébastien.
  - Creation of the Village of Courville from territories taken from the Municipality of Beauport.
  - The Village of Saint-Jean-Baptiste-de-la-Pointe-aux-Trembles became the Town of Pointe-aux-Trembles.
- 12 June: Creation of the Parish of Saint-Nicolas-Sud from territories taken from the Parish of Saint-Nicolas.
- 27 June: Creation of the Municipality of Partie-Est-du-Canton-d’Ely from territories taken from the Township of Ely and the Township of Ely-Nord.
- 10 July: Creation of the Village of Saint-Hilaire from territories taken from the Parish of Saint-Hilaire.
- 23 July: Creation of the Village of Saint-Charles-des-Grondines from territories taken from the Municipality of Grondines.
- 27 July: Creation of the Village of Lyster from territories taken from the Municipality of Sainte-Anastasie-de-Nelson.
- 12 August: Creation of the Village of Kénogami from territories taken from the Parish of Saint-Dominique-de-Jonquières.
- 20 September: Creation of the Village of Linière from territories taken from the Parish of Saint-Côme-de-Kennebec.
- 1 October: Creation of the Parish of Saint-Viateur from territories taken from the Parish of Saint-Cuthbert.
- 3 October:
  - Creation of the Parish of Saint-Isidore from territories taken from the Township of Guigues and the United Townships of Laverlochère-et-Baby.
  - Creation of the Parish of Saint-Placide.
  - The Township of Fabre became the Parish of **Saint-Édouard-de-Fabre**.
  - The Township of Guigues became the Parish of Saint-Bruno-de-Guigues.
  - The United Townships of Laverlochère-et-Baby became the Municipality of Est-des-Cantons-Unis-de-Laverlochère-et-Baby.
- 10 October: Creation of the Village of Saint-Flavien from territories taken from the Parish of Saint-Flavien.
- 22 October: Creation of the Village of Saint-Casimir from territories taken from the Parish of Saint-Casimir.
- 24 October:
  - The Municipality of Nouvelle-et-Shoolbred changed its name to **Escuminac**.
  - The Municipality of Shoolbred changed its name to Saint-Jean-l’Evangéliste.
- 2 November: Creation of the Village of Rivière-du-Moulin from territories taken from the Municipality of Chicoutimi.
- 6 November: Creation of the Village of Saint-Michel-de-Laval from territories taken from the Parish of La Visitation-du-Sault-au-Récollet and the Parish of Saint-Léonard-de-Port-Maurice.
- 7 November: Creation of the Village of Saint-Léonard-d’Aston from territories taken from the Municipality of Saint-Léonard.
- 12 November: Creation of the Municipality of Sud-Ouest-du-Canton-d’Halifax-Sud from territories taken from the Township of Halifax-Sud.
- 15 November: Creation of the Municipality of Nord-du-Canton-de-Windsor from territories taken from the Township of Windsor.
- 20 November: Creation of the Municipality of **Saint-Eugène-de-Guigues**.
- 10 December: Creation of the Village of Saint-Jacques-de-l'Achigan from territories taken from the Parish of Saint-Jacques.
- 13 December: Creation of the Village of Pérade from territories taken from the Parish of Sainte-Anne-de-la-Pérade.
- 21 December:
  - The Town of Maisonneuve became a City.
  - Creation of the Town of **Mont-Royal** from territories taken from the Parish of Saint-Laurent.
  - The Town of Summerlea is annexed by the City of Lachine.
  - The Town of Verdun became a City.
  - The Village of Cartier-Ville became the Town of Cartierville.
  - Creation of the Village of Giffard from territories taken from the Municipality of Beauport.

=== 1913 ===
- 1 January:
  - The Town of Montcalm is annexed by **Quebec City**.
  - The Village of Bel-Air is annexed by the Municipality of Saint-Eustache.
  - The Parish of Saint-Gabriel-Archange changed its name to **La Durantaye**.
- 25 January: Creation of the Municipality of Guigues from territories taken from the Township of **Nédélec**.
- 29 January: Creation of the Village of Lambton from territories taken from the Municipality of Lambton.
- 11 February: Creation of the Village of Rapide-de-l’Original from territories taken from the United Townships of Robertson-et-Pope.
- 19 February: Creation of the Village of Beauport from territories taken from the Municipality of Beauport.
- 27 March: Creation of the Village of Sainte-Cécile from territories taken from the Parish of Sainte-Cécile.
- 23 April:
  - The Village of Saint-Ambroise changed its name to Loretteville.
  - Creation of the Village of Saint-Zotique from territories taken from the Parish of Saint-Zotique.
  - Creation of the Parish of Notre-Dame-de-Mont-Carmel from territories taken from the Parish of Saint-Bernard-de-Lacolle.
- 30 May: Creation of the Village of Sainte-Marie from territories taken from the Parish of Sainte-Marie-de-la-Nouvelle-Beauce.
- 31 May: Creation of the Municipality of Nouveau-Salaberry from territories taken from the Parish of Sainte-Cécile.
- 1 June: Creation of the Town of **Châteauguay** from territories taken from the Parish of Saint-Joachim-de-Châteauguay.
- 27 June: The United Townships of Bowman-et-Villeneuve are split into the Township of Bowman and the Township of Villeneuve.
- 8 July: Creation of the Village of Saint-Henri from territories taken from the Parish of Saint-Henri.
- 24 July: Creation of the Municipality of Partie-Sud-du-Canton-de-Masham from territories taken from the Township of Masham.
- 7 August: The Village of Baie-Saint-Paul became a Town.
- 29 September: Creation of the Village of Saint-Casimir-Est from territories taken from the Parish of Saint-Casimir.
- 6 December: The Municipality of Guigues changed its name to Notre-Dame-des-Quinze-du-Canton-Guigues.
- 16 December: Creation of the Township of **Saint-Godefroi** from territories taken from the Township of **Hope**.
- 22 December: Creation of the Village of Verchères from territories taken from the Municipality of Verchères.
- 29 December: The Parish of Saint-Antoine-de-Padoue-de-Kempt changed its name to Saint-Antoine-de-Padoue.
- 31 December: Creation of the Village of Fortierville from territories taken from the Parish of Sainte-Philomène-de-Fortierville.

=== 1914 ===
- 19 January: Creation of the Village of Saint-Dominique from territories taken from the Parish of Saint-Dominique.
- 31 January: Creation of the Village of Amos.
- 19 February:
  - Creation of the Town of **Hampstead** from territories taken from the Village of Côte-Saint-Luc.
  - Creation of the Town of Roxboro from territories taken from the Parish of Sainte-Geneviève.
  - The Town of Windsor Mills changed its name to **Windsor**.
  - Creation of the Municipality of **Lac-des-Seize-Îles** from territories taken from the Township of Montcalm and the Township of **Wentworth**.
  - The Village of **Beloeil** became a Town.
  - Creation of the Village of Saraguay from territories taken from the Town of Cartierville and the Parish of Saint-Laurent.
  - The Village of Sault-au-Récollet became a Town.
- 11 March: Creation of the Village of Notre-Dame-de-Portneuf from territories taken from the Parish of Notre-Dame-de-Portneuf.
- 29 March: Creation of the Parish of Saint-Honoré from territories taken from the Township of Tremblay.
- 3 April: Creation of the United Townships of Masson-et-Laviolette.
- 4 April: Creation of the Village of Sainte-Agathe from territories taken from the Parish of Sainte-Agathe.
- 14 May: Creation of the Parish of Saint-Joseph-de-la-Rivière-Bleue.
- 1 June: Creation of the Town of **Léry** from territories taken from the Parish of Saint-Joachim-de-Châteauguay.
- 17 June: Creation of the Municipality of Sainte-Rose from territories taken from the Parish of Sainte-Rose-de-Lima.
- 25 June: Creation of the Village of Amiante from territories taken from the Municipality of Sud-du-Canton-de-Thetford.
- 28 July: Creation of the Village of Val-Barrette from territories taken from the Township of Est-du-Canton-de-Campbell.
- 27 August:
  - Creation of the Village of Farnham from territories taken from the Township of Farnham-Est.
  - Creation of the Village of Rougemont from territories taken from the Parish of Saint-Michel-de-Rougemont.
- 29 October:
  - Creation of the Municipality of Sept-Cantons-Unis-de-Saguenay.
  - Creation of the Parish of **Saint-Siméon** from territories taken from the Parish of Saint-Bonaventure-de-Hamilton.
- 5 November: Creation of the Village of Lotbinière from territories taken from the Municipality of Lotbinière.
- 7 November: Creation of the Village of Charlesbourg from territories taken from the Municipality of Charlesbourg.
- 28 December: Creation of the Township of Romieux from territories taken from the United Townships of Dalibaire-et-Romieu.

=== 1915 ===
- 30 January: Creation of the Village of Saint-Charles from territories taken from the Parish of Saint-Charles-Boromée.
- 5 March:
  - Creation of the Town of Île-Dorval from territories taken from the Town of **Dorval**.
  - Creation of the Town of Laval-sur-le-Lac from territories taken from the Parish of Sainte-Dorothée and the Parish of Sainte-Rose-de-Lima.
  - The Town of Outremont became a City.
  - Creation of the Municipality of **Honfleur** from territories taken from the Parish of Saint-Anselme, the Parish of Saint-Gervais-et-Saint-Protais, the Parish of Saint-Lazare and the Parish of Sainte-Claire.
  - Creation of the Municipality of **Lac-Tremblant-Nord** from territories taken from the Township of Joly.
  - The Village of Saint-Michel-de-Laval became the Town of Ville-Saint-Michel.
  - The Village of **Sainte-Agathe-des-Monts** became a Town.
  - The Parish of La Visitation-du-Sault-au-Récollet became the Town of Montréal-Nord.
  - Creation of the Parish of Notre-Dame-de-Liesse from territories taken from the Parish of Saint-Laurent.
  - The Parish of Saint-Léonard-de-Port-Maurice became a Town.
- 17 April: The Parish of Saint-Félicien-Partie-Nord-Ouest changed its name to Notre-Dame-de-la-Doré.
- 21 April: Creation of the Village of Donnacona from territories taken from the Parish of Saint-Jean-Baptiste-des-Écureuils.
- 3 May: Creation of the Municipality of **Sainte-Madeleine-de-la-Rivière-Madeleine** from territories taken from the Municipality of **Saint-Maxime-du-Mont-Louis**.
- 10 May: Creation of the Village of Saint-Pierre-du-Lac from territories taken from the Parish of Saint-Pierre-du-Lac.
- 25 May: The Village of Rapide-de-l’Original is annexed by the Village of Mont-Laurier.
- 14 September: Creation of the Village of Saint-Alexandre from territories taken from the Parish of Saint-Alexandre.
- 22 September: Creation of the Municipality of Escourt.
- 28 September: Creation of the Parish of Saint-Raymond-de-Pennafort-de-Weedon from territories taken from the Township of Weedon.
- 5 October: Creation of the Village of Turcotte from territories taken from the Parish of Saint-Théophile.
- 7 October: Creation of the Village of Val-Jalbert from territories taken from the Municipality of Roberval and the Parish of Saint-Louis-de-Métabetchouan.
- 27 October:
  - Creation of the Village of Angers from territories taken from the Village of Masson.
  - Creation of the Village of Deux-Rivières from territories taken from the Parish of Saint-Stanislas-de-la-Rivière-des-Envies.
- 29 October: Creation of the Village of Howick from territories taken from the Parish of Très-Saint-Sacrement.
- 26 November: Creation of the Village of L’Abord-à-Plouffe from territories taken from the Parish of Saint-Martin.

=== 1916 ===
- 1 January:
  - Creation of the Parish of Sainte-Marthe-du-Cap-de-la-Magdeleine from territories taken from the Parish of Cap-de-la-Magdeleine.
  - The United Townships of Normandin-et-d’Albanel became the Township of Normandin.
- 7 January: The Municipality of North-Stukely became the Parish of Sainte-Anne-de-Stukely.
- 13 January: Creation of the Village of Chandler from territories taken from the Municipality of Pabos.
- 19 January: The Parish of Saint-Louis-de-Métabetchouan changed its name to Saint-Louis-de-Chambord.
- 7 February: Creation of the Municipality of Talon from territories taken from the United Townships of Rolette-Panet-et-Talon.
- 9 March:
  - Creation of the Town of Québec-Ouest from territories taken from the Municipality of Petite-Rivière.
  - Creation of the Town of **Trois-Pistoles** from territories taken from the Municipality of Trois-Pistoles.
  - The Parish of Pointe-aux-Trembles became the Town of Laval-de-Montréal.
- 16 March:
  - The Town of Lévis became a City.
  - The Village of Dorion became a Town.
  - Creation of the Parish of Saint-Léonard-de-Port-Maurice from territories taken from the Town of Saint-Léonard-de-Port-Maurice.
- 31 March:
  - Creation of the Municipality of Saint-Henri-de-Taillon from territories taken from the Municipality of **Saint-Henri-de-Taillon**.
  - Creation of the Village of **Warden** from territories taken from the Township of **Shefford**.
- 12 April: Creation of the Parish of **Saint-Hilaire-de-Dorset**.
- 8 May: Creation of the Village of Saint-Gédéon from territories taken from the Parish of Saint-Gédéon.
- 3 August: Creation of the Village of Cap-à-l'Aigle from territories taken from the Parish of Saint-Étienne-de-Murray-Bay.
- 12 August: The Village of Saint-Pierre-du-Lac changed its name to Val-Brillant.
- 26 September: The Township of Northfield became a Municipality.
- 4 October: Creation of the Parish of Sainte-Claire-d’Assise from territories taken from the Parish of Saint-Zotique.
- 12 October: Creation of the Parish of Saint-Raphaël from territories taken from the Municipality **Saint-Wenceslas**, the Municipality of **Sainte-Eulalie** and the Parish of Sainte-Anne-du-Sault.
- 22 December:
  - The Town of Cartierville and the Town of Sault-au-Récollet are annexed by the City of **Montréal**.
  - The Town of Saint-Jean became a City.
  - The Village of Courville became a Town.
  - The Village of **Granby** became a City.
  - The Village of Sainte-Thérèse-de-Blainville became the Town of **Sainte-Thérèse**.

=== 1917 ===
- 1 January:
  - Creation of the Municipality of Nord-Est-des-Cantons-de-Wabassee-Dudley-et-Bouthiller from territories taken from the United Townships of Wabassee, Dudley et Bouthillier.
  - Creation of the Parish of **Saint-Louis-de-Gonzague-du-Cap-Tourmente** from territories taken from the Parish of **Saint-Joachim**.
- 1 February: The Parish of Notre-Dame-de-la-Victoire is annexed by the City of Lévis.
- 8 February: Creation of the Village of Ferme-Neuve from territories taken from the United Townships of Wurtele-Moreau-et-Gravel.
- 27 February: Creation of the Municipality of Saint-Charles-de-Charlesbourg from territories taken from the Parish of Charlesbourg.
- 5 March: Creation of the Village of Wakefield from territories taken from the Township of Masham and the Township of Wakefield.
- 28 March:
  - Creation of the Municipality of Saindon from territories taken from the Parish of Sainte-Marie-de-Sayabec.
  - Creation of the Village of Saint-François-du-Lac from territories taken from the Parish of Saint-François-du-Lac.
- 30 March: The Village of Saint-Jacques-de-l'Achigan changed its name to Saint-Jacques.
- 2 April: Creation of the Village of Petit-Lac-Magog from territories taken from the Township of **Orford**.
- 11 May: Creation of the Village of Sainte-Angèle-de-Mérici from territories taken from the Parish of Sainte-Angèle-de-Mérici.
- 7 June: Creation of the Village of Foster from territories taken from the Township of Brome.
- 11 June: Creation of the Parish of Saint-Venant-de-Hereford from territories taken from the Township of Hereford.
- 18 June: Creation of the Village of Saint-Jovite from territories taken from the United Townships of DeSalaberry-et-Grandison.
- 31 July: Creation of the Village of McMasterville from territories taken from the Parish of Saint-Mathieu-de-Beloeil.
- 1 August: Creation of the Municipality of Parties-des-Paroisses-de-Saint-Constant-et-Saint-Philippe from territories taken from the Parish of Saint-Constant and the Parish of Saint-Philippe.
- 15 August: Creation of the Township of La Sarre.
- 28 August: Creation of the Parish of Sainte-Angèle from territories taken from the Parish of Saint-Paulin and the Parish of Sainte-Ursule.
- 10 September: Creation of the United Townships of Figuery-et-Dalquier.
- 29 September: Creation of the United Townships of La Reine-et-Desmeloizes.
- 2 October:
  - Creation of the Municipality of Bishop's Crossing from territories taken from the Municipality of Dudswell.
  - Creation of the Municipality of Hatley from territories taken from the Township of **Hatley**.
- 10 October: Creation of the Village of Champlain from territories taken from the Parish of Champlain.
- 22 October: Creation of the Municipality of Saint-Joseph-d’Alma from territories taken from the Municipality of Saint-Joseph-d’Alma.
- 14 December: Creation of the Village of Saint-Ambroise from territories taken from the Municipality of Saint-Ambroise.

=== 1918 ===
- 4 January: Creation of the Village of Delson from territories taken from the Parish of Saint-Constant.
- 17 January: Creation of the Village of Saint-Alban from territories taken from the Parish of Saint-Alban-d'Alton.
- 8 February:
  - Creation of the Village of Calumet from territories taken from the Township of Grenville.
  - Creation of the Village of Como-Est from territories taken from the Village of Como.
- 9 February:
  - The City of Maisonneuve is annexed by the City of **Montréal**.
  - The Town of **Joliette** became a City.
  - Creation of the Municipality of **Charette**.
  - The Village of Sainte-Rose became a Town.
  - The Parish of Cap-de-la-Magdeleine became the Town of Cap-de-la-Madeleine.
  - Creation of the Parish of Saint-Edmond-de-Grantham from territories taken from the Parish of Saint-Bonaventure, the Parish of Saint-Germain and the Parish of Saint-Guillaume.
  - Creation of the Parish of Saint-Octave-de-Dosquet from territories taken from the Municipality of Sainte-Anastasie-de-Nelson, the Parish of Saint-Agapit-de-Beaurivage and the Parish of Saint-Flavien.
- 15 February: Creation of the United Townships of Royal-Roussillon-et-Poularies.
- 18 February: Creation of the United Townships of Fiedmont-et-Barraute.
- 22 February: Creation of the Parish of **Saint-Cyprien** from territories taken from the Municipality of **Sainte-Rose-de-Watford** and the Parish of Sainte-Justine.
- 23 February: The Village of Sainte-Jeanne-de-Neuville changed its name to Pont-Rouge.
- 6 March: Creation of the Village of Saint-Herménégilde from territories taken from the Municipality of **Saint-Herménégilde**.
- 7 March: Creation of the Parish of Notre-Dame-de-Bonsecours from territories taken from the Parish of Notre-Dame-de-Bonsecours.
- 12 March: Creation of the Village of Saint-Boniface-de-Shawinigan from territories taken from the Township of Shawenegan.
- 22 April: Creation of the Municipality of Port-Alfred from territories taken from the Municipality of Grande-Baie and the Village of Saint-Alexis-de-la-Grande-Baie.
- 27 May: Creation of the Municipality of Saint-Fabien-de-Panet from territories taken from the Parish of **Saint-Fabien-de-Panet**.
- 28 May: Creation of the Municipality of L’Annonciation from territories taken from the Parish of Annonciation.
- 1 June: Creation of the Town of Maple Grove from territories taken from the Parish of Saint-Clément.
- 27 June: Creation of the Village of Luceville from territories taken from the Parish of Sainte-Luce.
- 15 July: Creation of the Township of **Landrienne** and the Township of **Trécesson**.
- 29 July: Creation of the Parish of Saint-Joseph-de-Mont-Rolland from territories taken from the Parish of Sainte-Adèle.
- 15 August: Creation of the Municipality of Figuery-et-Dalquier.
- 20 September: Creation of the Municipality of **Authier** and the Municipality of La Reine-et-Desmeloizes.
- 3 October: The Municipality of Saint-Henri-de-Taillon changed its name to Jeanne-d’Arc.
- 24 October:
  - Creation of the Village of Saint-Marc-des-Carrières from territoires taken from the Municipality of Deschambault, the Municipality of Grondines and the Parish of Saint-Alban-d'Alton.
  - Creation of the United Townships of Carpentier-et-de-Courville.
- 7 November:
  - Creation of the Village of Durham-Sud from territories taken from the Municipality of **Durham-Sud**.
  - Creation of the Parish of Saint-François-Xavier-des-Hauteurs.
- 14 November: Creation of the Municipality of **Tourville** from territories taken the Township of Ashford.
- 21 November: Creation of the Village of **Tring-Jonction** from territories taken from the Parish of Saint-Frédéric-de-Beauce.

=== 1919 ===
- 12 February: Creation of the Village of Wottonville from territories taken from the Township of Wotton.
- 25 February: Creation of the Parish of Ascension-de-Notre-Seigneur from territories taken from the Township of Delisle and other unorganized territories.
- 4 March:
  - The City of Fraserville changed its name to **Rivière-du-Loup**.
  - Creation of the Township of **Bedford** from territories taken from the Town of **Bedford**.
- 19 April: Creation of the Township of Privat.
- 29 April: Creation of the Village of Macamic from territories taken from the United Townships of Royal-Roussillon-et-Poularies.
- 28 May: Creation of the Parish of **Saint-Jules** from territories taken from the Municipality of Saint-Victor-de-Tring, the Parish of Saint-François, the Parish of Saint-Frédéric-de-Beauce and the Parish of Saint-Joseph-de-la-Beauce.
- 9 June: Creation of the Village of Saint-Rédempteur from territories taken from the Parish of Saint-Étienne-de-Lauzon.
- 13 June:
  - Creation of the Village of Francoeur from territories taken from the Parish of Saint-Apollinaire.
  - Creation of the Township of Senneterre.
- 7 July: Creation of the Municipality of Est-de-la-Paroisse-de-Sainte-Flore from territories taken from the Parish of Sainte-Flore.
- 30 July:
  - Creation of the Village of Montauban from territories taken from the Parish of Notre-Dame-des-Anges-de-Montauban, the Parish of Saint-Rémi and the Parish of Saint-Ubalde.
  - Creation of the Village of Notre-Dame-des-Anges from territories taken from the Parish of Notre-Dame-des-Anges-de-Montauban.
- 2 August: The Village of Turcotte changed its name to Saint-Georges.
- 12 August:
  - Creation of the Village of Saint-Liboire from territories taken from the Parish of Saint-Liboire.
  - Creation of the Township of Dumas from territories taken from the Township of Saint-Jean.
- 5 September: The Municipality of Port-Alfred became a Town.
- 23 September: Creation of the Municipality of Nédélec from territories taken from the Township of **Nédélec**.
- 29 September: Creation of the Village of Saint-Timothée from territories taken from the Parish of Saint-Thimothée.
- 14 October: Creation of the Village of Lac-Saint-Louis from territories taken from the Parish of Saint-Clément.
- 15 October: Creation of the Village of Saint-Sylvestre from territories taken from the Parish of Saint-Sylvestre-de-Beaurivage.
- 5 November: The Municipality of Escourt changes its name to Saint-David-d’Escourt.
- 20 November: Creation of the Village of Neuville from territories taken from the Municipality of Pointe-aux-Trembles.
- 3 December: The Municipality of Saint-Fabien-de-Panet changed its name to Saint-Juste-de-Bretenières.
- 16 December: Creation of the Village of Rawdon from territories taken from the Township of Rawdon.
- 30 December: Creation of the Village of **Sainte-Madeleine** from territories taken from the Parish of **Sainte-Marie-Madeleine**.

=== 1920 ===
- 7 January:
  - The Village of Bagotville became a Town.
  - Creation of the Parish of Sainte-Anne-de-Beaupré from territories taken from the Village of Sainte-Anne-de-Beaupré.
- 14 February:
  - The Town of Grand-Mère became a City.
  - Creation of the Town of Kipawa.
  - The Town of **Longueuil** became a City.
  - Creation of the Town of Saguenay from territories taken from the Municipality of Chicoutimi.
  - The Town of Saint-Germain-de-Rimouski changed its name to **Rimouski**.
  - The Village of Kénogami became a Town.
  - The Village of Lennoxville became a Town.
  - Creation of the Township of Décarie.
- 2 March:
  - Creation of the Village of Templeton and the Municipality of Templeton-Est from territories taken from the Municipality of Templeton-Est.
  - Creation of the Township of Ely-Partie-Ouest from territories taken from the Township of Ely and the Township of Ely-Nord.
- 8 March: The Municipality of Whitton changed its name to **Sainte-Cécile-de-Whitton**.
- 3 April: Creation of the Village of Saint-Jean-de-Boischatel from territories taken from the Parish of Ange-Gardien.
- 28 April: Creation of the Parish of **Saint-Zénon-du-Lac-Humqui**.
- 29 April: Creation of the Municipality of Loranger from territories taken from the Township of Loranger.
- 7 May:
  - Creation of the Municipality of Brompton-Gore from territories taken from the Township of **Melbourne**.
  - Creation of the Township of Isle-aux-Allumettes-Partie-Est from territories taken from the Township of Île-Allumettes.
- 25 May: Creation of the Village of Belle-Plage from territories taken from the Municipality of Vaudreuil.
- 1 June: Creation of the Village of Bic from territories taken from the Parish of Sainte-Cécile-du-Bic.
- 17 June: Creation of the Village of Saint-Ubalde from territories taken from the Parish of Saint-Ubalde.
- 8 July:
  - Creation of the Municipality of Suffolk from territories taken from the United Townships of Suffolk-et-Addington.
  - Creation of the Village of Beauport-Est from territories taken from the Municipality of Beauport and the Village of Beauport.
- 28 August: Creation of the Village of Saint-Anselme from territories taken from the Parish of Saint-Anselme.
- 11 October: Creation of the Municipality of **Montpellier** from territories taken from the Township of Ripon, the United Townships of Hartwell-et-Preston, the United Townships of Mulgrave-et-Derry and other unorganized territories.
- 15 October: Creation of the Village of Clarenceville from territories taken from the Parish of Saint-Georges-de-Clarenceville.
- 26 October: Creation of the Parish of Saint-Raphaël-d’Albertville.
- 16 November:
  - Creation of the Village of Saint-Alexis from territories taken from the Parish of Saint-Alexis.
  - Creation of the Village of Saint-Joseph-de-la-Rivière-Bleue from territories taken from the Parish of Saint-Joseph-de-la-Rivière-Bleue.
- 17 November: The Township of Egan is split into the Municipality of **Bois-Franc**, the Municipality of **Egan-Sud** and the Municipality of Montcerf.
- 20 November: The Village of **Donnacona** became a Town.
- 11 December: Creation of the Village of Lacolle from territories taken from the Parish of Notre-Dame-de-Mont-Carmel.

=== 1921 ===
- 31 January: Creation of the Municipality of Bouchette-Sud from territories taken from the Township of Bouchette and the Township of Wright.
- 1 February: Creation of the Village of Saint-Cœur-de-Marie from territories taken from the Township of Delisle.
- 25 February:
  - The Town of Kipawa changed its name to **Témiscaming**.
  - Creation of the Town of **Lac-Sergent** from territories taken from the Parish of Saint-Raymond-Nonnat and the Parish of Sainte-Catherine.
  - Creation of the Parish of Saint-Philibert-de-Beauce from territories taken from the Municipality of Aubert-Gallion, the Parish of Saint-Côme-de-Kennebec and the Township of Watford West.
  - The Township of Duhamel became the Municipality of **Duhamel-Ouest**.
- 17 March: The Village of **Huntingdon** became a Town.
- 18 March: Creation of the Village of Épiphanie from territories taken from the Parish of L’Épiphanie.
- 19 March:
  - The Town of **Saint-Lambert** became a City.
  - The Town of Shawinigan-Falls became a City.
  - The Municipality of Parties-des-Paroisses-de-Saint-Constant-et-Saint-Philippe became the Parish of Saint-Mathieu.
  - The Village of Petit-Métis changed its name to Métis-sur-Mer.
  - Creation of the Parish of **Saint-Camille-de-Lellis** from territories taken from the United Townships of Roux-Bellechasse-et-Daaquam.
  - Creation of the Parish of Sainte-Sabine from territories taken from the Parish of Notre-Dame-de-Stanbridge, the Parish of Saint-Alexandre, the Parish of Saint-Ignace-de-Stanbridge, the Parish of Sainte-Brigide-de-Monnoir and the Township of Farnham-Ouest.
- 21 March:
  - Creation of the Municipality of Rock Forest from territories taken from the Township of Ascot and the Township of **Orford**.
  - Creation of the Parish of Saint-Pierre-d’Estcourt from territories taken from the Municipality of Saint-David-d’Escourt and the Township of Pohénégamook.
- 20 April: Creation of the Township of Langelier.
- 29 April: Creation of the Village of Saint-Isidore from territories taken from the Parish of Saint-Isidore-de-Lauzon.
- 10 May: Creation of the Village of Saint-Jean-Baptiste-de-Bélisle from territories taken from the Parish of Sainte-Agathe.
- 14 May: The Village of Como changed its name to Hudson.
- 18 May: Creation of the Township of **Launay**.
- 19 May: Creation of the Parish of **Saint-Cléophas**.
- 30 May:
  - Creation of the Municipality of Ouest-du-Canton-de-la-Motte.
  - Creation of the Village of Sainte-Croix from territories taken from the Parish of Sainte-Croix.
- 4 June:
  - Creation of the Municipality of **Saint-Roch-Ouest** from territories taken from the Parish of Saint-Roch.
  - Creation of the Village of Saint-Raphaël from territories taken from the Parish of Saint-Raphaël.
  - Creation of the Village of Saint-Ulric from territories taken from the Parish of Saint-Ulric.
- 13 June: Creation of the Parish of Saint-Amable from territories taken from the Parish of Saint-Marc and the Parish of Saint-Mathieu-de-Beloeil.
- 12 July: Creation of the Village of Saint-Clet from territories taken from the Parish of Saint-Clet.
- 20 July: Creation of the Municipality of Rivière-du-Gouffre from territories taken from the Parish of Baie-Saint-Paul.
- 21 July: Creation of the Village of Deschênes from territories taken from the Municipality of Hull.
- 22 July: Creation of the Municipality of Sydenham-Sud from territories taken from the Municipality of Baie-de-Gaspé-Nord.
- 12 August: Creation of the Parish of Saint-Luc from territories taken from the Parish of **Saint-Léon-de-Standon** and the Parish of Sainte-Germaine-du-Lac-Etchemin.
- 18 August: Creation of the Village of Saint-Eustache-sur-le-Lac from territories taken from the Municipality of Saint-Eustache.
- 19 August:
  - Creation of the Municipality of Messine from territories taken from the Township of Bouchette.
  - Creation of the Village of Saint-Ludger from territories taken from the Municipality of Gayhurst.
- 14 September: Creation of the Village of Saint-Patrice-de-Beaurivage from territories taken from the Parish of Saint-Patrice-de-Beaurivage.
- 24 September: The Municipality of Est-des-Cantons-Unis-de-Laverlochère-et-Baby changed its name to Fugerville.
- 12 October: Creation of the Municipality of Saint-Joseph-de-la-Baie-du-Febvre from territories taken from the Parish of Saint-Antoine-de-la-Baie-du-Febvre.
- 13 October:
  - Creation of the Municipality of **Girardville**.
  - Creation of the Municipality of **Saint-Antoine-sur-Richelieu** from territories taken from the Parish of Saint-Antoine-de-Padoue.
- 23 November: The Municipality of Loranger changed its name to Lacaille.
- 21 December: Creation of the Village of Laterrière from territories taken from the Parish of Notre-Dame-de-Laterrière.
- 13 December: Creation of the Parish of Sacré-Cœur-de-Jésus.

=== 1922 ===
- 25 January: Creation of the Municipality of Rivière-Boyer from territories taken from the Parish of Saint-Henri.
- 26 January: Creation of the Village of Kingsey Falls from territories taken from the Municipality of Chutes-de-Kingsey.
- 27 January: Creation of the Village of Manseau from territories taken from the Parish of Saint-Joseph-de-Blandford.
- 30 January: Creation of the Parish of Sainte-Jeanne-d'Arc.
- 8 February: Creation of the Township of Bégin.
- 13 February: Creation of the Parish of **Saint-Narcisse-de-Rimouski** from territories taken from the Parish of Sainte-Blandine.
- 1 March: Creation of the Village of Saint-Victor-de-Tring from territories taken from the Municipality of Saint-Victor-de-Tring.
- 8 March: The Town of Baie-Saint-Paul became a Village.
- 21 March:
  - Creation of the Town of Île-Cadieux from territories taken from the Municipality of Vaudreuil.
  - Creation of the Parish of Larouche.
- 24 April: Creation of the Village of Saint-Paul from territories taken from the Parish of Conversion-de-Saint-Paul.
- 30 May:
  - Creation of the Municipality of Paspébiac-Ouest from territories taken from the Municipality of Paspébiac.
  - Creation of the Village of La Reine from territories taken from the United Townships of La Reine-et-Desmeloizes.
- 27 June: Creation of the Municipality of **Val-Morin** from territories taken from the Parish of Sainte-Adèle.
- 31 July: Creation of the Village of Saint-Wenceslas from territories taken from the Municipality of **Saint-Wenceslas**.
- 14 August: Creation of the Municipality of **Lemieux** from territories taken from territories taken from the Parish of Saint-Joseph-de-Blandford and the Parish of Sainte-Marie-de-Blandford.
- 11 September: Creation of the Municipality of **Lac-Saint-Paul** from territories taken from the United Townships of Wurtele-Moreau-et-Gravel.
- 16 September: The Municipality of Nord-du-Canton-de-Windsor changed its name to **Saint-Claude**.
- 18 September: Creation of the Village of Sainte-Monique from territories taken from the Parish of Sainte-Monique.
- 22 September: Creation of the Village of Saint-Faustin-Station from territories taken from the Township of Wolfe.
- 10 October: Creation of the Municipality of **Lefebvre** from territories taken from the Municipality of **Durham-Sud**, the Municipality of **L'Avenir** and the Municipality of Wickham-Ouest.
- 20 October: Creation of the Village of Wickham-Ouest from territories taken from the Municipality of Wickham-Ouest.
- 9 November: Creation of the Municipality of Rivière-Blanche from territories taken from the Township of Ireland-Nord.
- 16 December: The Municipality of La Reine-et-Desmeloizes changed its name to Saint-Jacques-de-Dupuy.
- 20 December: Creation of the Village of Sainte-Adèle from territories taken from the Parish of Sainte-Adèle.
- 29 December: The Town of Cap-de-la-Madeleine became a City.

=== 1923 ===
- 17 March: Creation of the Municipality of **Saint-Louis-de-Gonzague** from territories taken from the Municipality of **Sainte-Rose-de-Watford** and the Parish of **Saint-Cyprien**.
- 23 March: Creation of the Township of Senneterre.
- 11 May: Creation of the Municipality of **Saint-Thomas-Didyme**.
- 23 May:
  - Creation of the Municipality of Saint-Dominique-du-Lac from territories taken from the Parish of Notre-Dame-du-Lac and other unorganized territories.
  - Creation of the Parish of Saint-Maurice from territories taken from the Township of Fox.
- 7 June: The Township of Pohénégamook became the Parish of Saint-Éleuthère.
- 20 June:
  - Creation of the Village of **Brome** from territories taken from the Township of Brome.
  - Creation of the Village of Saint-Prime from territories taken from the Parish of Saint-Prime.
- 26 June: Creation of the Village of Ripon from territories taken from the Township of Ripon.
- 28 July: The Municipality of Suffolk changed its name to Vinoy.
- 22 September: Creation of the Municipality of **Piedmont** from territories taken from the Parish of Saint-Sauveur.
- 25 September: Creation of the Village of Shawinigan-Est from territories taken from the Parish of Sainte-Flore.
- 30 October: Creation of the Township of Otis.
- 14 November:
  - Creation of the Municipality of Saint-Eugène from territories taken from the Municipality of Saint-Michel-de-Mistassini.
  - Creation of the Village of Cabano from territories taken from the Parish of Saint-Mathias-de-Cabano.
- 18 December: Creation of the Municipality of Christie, the Municipality of Duchesnay and the Parish of Saint-Joachim-de-Tourelle from territories taken from the Municipality of Sainte-Anne-des-Monts.

=== 1924 ===
- 12 January: The Village of Beauport became a Town.
- 14 January: Creation of the Parish of **Saint-Joseph-de-Kamouraska** from territories taken from the Parish of Saint-Alexandre, the Parish of Saint-André and the Parish of Sainte-Hélène.
- 7 February: Creation of the Parish of Sainte-Jeanne-d’Arc from territories taken from the Municipality of Saint-Amédée, the Municipality of Saint-Michel-de-Mistassini and other unorganized territories.
- 8 February: The Village of Bienville is annexed by the Town of Lauzon.
- 27 February: Creation of the Township of Denholm.
- 15 March Creation of the Town of Isle-Maligne from territories taken from the Municipality of Saint-Joseph-d’Alma.
- 11 April: Creation of the Municipality of Dollard-des-Ormeaux from territories taken from the Parish of Sainte-Geneviève.
- 30 April: Creation of the Village of Saint-Charles-sur-Richelieu from territories taken from the Parish of Saint-Charles.
- 7 May: Creation of the Municipality of **Poularies** from territories taken from the United Townships of Royal-Roussillon-et-Poularies.
- 26 July: The Village of Lac-Weedon changed its name to Saint-Gérard.
- 3 September: Creation of the Parish of Saint-Gérard-des-Laurentides from territories taken from the Parish of Sainte-Flore.
- 22 September: Creation of the Municipality of **Villeroy**.
- 4 October: The Parish of Saint-Nazaire-de-Dorchester changed its name to Saint-Nazaire.
- 17 November: Creation of the Village of Saint-Joseph-de-Grantham from territories taken from the Township of Grantham.
- 18 November:
  - Creation of the Municipality of Saint-Jean-Baptiste from territories taken from the Village of Mont-Joli.
  - Creation of the United Townships of **Latulipe-et-Gaboury**.
- 19 November:
  - Creation of the Municipality of **Sainte-Lucie-de-Beauregard** from territories taken from the Municipality of Talon.
  - Creation of the Parish of **Saint-Marcellin**.
- 15 December:
  - Creation of the Municipality of **Shigawake** from territories taken from the Township of **Saint-Godefroi**.
  - The Parish of Notre-Dame-du-Perpétuel-Secours-de-Charny became the Village of Charny.
- 16 December: The Municipality of Saint-Joseph-d’Alma became a Town.
- 29 December: Creation of the Village of Enfant-Jésus from territories taken from the Parish of L'Enfant-Jésus.

=== 1925 ===
- 1 January: The Town of Laval-de-Montréal is annexed by the Town of Pointe-aux-Trembles.
- 13 February: The Village of Shawinigan-Est is annexed by the City of Shawinigan Falls.
- 4 March: Creation of the Town of Riverbend from territories taken from the Municipality of Saint-Joseph-d’Alma.
- 3 April: The Village of **Amos** became a Town.
- 14 May: Creation of the Parish of **Saint-Augustin** from territories taken from the Municipality of **Péribonka** and the Municipality of Saint-Amédée.
- 19 May: Creation of the Village of McNaugton from territories taken from the Village of Hudson.
- 2 July: Creation of the Village of Saint-Paulin from territories taken from the Parish of Saint-Paulin.
- 9 September: Creation of the Village of Sainte-Hélène-de-Bagot from territories taken from the Parish of Sainte-Hélène.
- 6 October:
  - Creation of the Municipality of **Labrecque** from territories taken from the Township of Taché and other unorganized territories.
  - Creation of the Parish of Saint-Benoît-Abbé.
- 28 October: Creation of the Parish of Notre-Dame-de-Lourdes from territories taken from the Municipality of Sainte-Elizabeth.
- 14 December: Creation of the Municipality of **Rivière-au-Tonnerre**.

=== 1926 ===
- 3 March:
  - Creation of the Municipality of Louis-Joliette from territories taken from the Parish of Sainte-Claire.
  - Creation of the Village of Priceville from territories taken from the Parish of Saint-Octave-de-Métis.
- 6 March: The Village of Hudson changed its name to Hudson Heights.
- 11 March: Creation of the Town of Noranda.
- 20 March: The Parish of Sainte-Marguerite-de-Blairfindie became the Municipality of Lacadie.
- 24 March:
  - Creation of the City of Arvida from territories taken from the Municipality of Chicoutimi and the Parish of Saint-Dominique-de-Jonquières.
  - Creation of the Town of **Barkmere** from territories taken from the Township of **Arundel** and the Township of Montcalm.
  - Creation of the Town of Château-d’Eau from territories taken from the Village of Loretteville.
- 6 April:
  - Creation of the Municipality of Pont-Viau from territories taken from the Municipality of Saint-Vincent-de-Paul.
  - Creation of the Village of Cap-Chat from territories taken from the Municipality of Saint-Norbert-du-Cap-Chatte.
- 10 April: The Village of McNaugton changed its name to Hudson.
- 26 April: Creation of the Village of Normandin from territories taken from the Township of Normandin.
- 5 May: Creation of the Village of Rouyn.
- 8 May: Creation of the Municipality of **Huberdeau** from territories taken from the Township of **Arundel**.
- 18 May: The Village of New Rockland is annexed by the Village of **Kingsbury**.
- 29 June: Creation of the Parish of Notre-Dame-de-la-Providence from territories taken from the Parish of Saint-François and the Parish of Saint-Georges.
- 10 July: Creation of the Village of Saint-Félix-de-Valois from territories taken from the Municipality of Saint-Félix-de-Valois.
- 29 July: Creation of the Village of Saint-Sauveur-des-Monts from territories taken from the Parish of Saint-Sauveur.
- 16 August:
  - The Municipality of Saint-Amédée is annexed by the Municipality of **Péribonka**.
  - Creation of the Village of Saint-Emilien from territories taken from the Parish of Saint-Jérôme.
- 27 August:
  - Creation of the Municipality of Colombourg from territories taken from the Township of La Sarre.
  - Creation of the Parish of Saint-Jean-Baptiste-Vianney.
- 3 September: Creation of the Parish of Saint-François-d’Assise from territories taken from the Township of Matapédia.
- 10 November: Creation of the Parish of **Saint-Marc-de-Figuery** from territories taken from the Municipality of Figuery-et-Dalquier and the Township of **Landrienne**.
- 20 November: Creation of the Parish of Saint-Mathieu-de-Dixville from territories taken from the Municipality of **Saint-Herménégilde** and the Township of Barford.
- 30 November: Creation of the Village of Lavaltrie from territories taken from the Parish of Saint-Antoine-de-la-Valtrie.
- 22 December: Creation of the Village of Saint-Pacôme from territories taken from the Parish of Saint-Pacôme.

=== 1927 ===
- 1 January: The Municipality of Tadoussac became the Parish of Sacré-Coeur-de-Jésus.
- 1 April:
  - Creation of the Town of Dolbeau from territories taken from the Municipality of Saint-Michel-de-Mistassini.
  - Creation of the Town of Mercier.
  - The Village of Rouyn became a Town.
- 30 July: The Municipality of Saint-Charles-de-Charlesbourg changed its name to Charlesbourg-Est.
- 12 September:
  - Creation of the Municipality of Carleton-sur-Mer from territories taken from the Township of Carleton.
  - Creation of the Municipality of Roquemaure from territories taken from the Municipality of Saint-Jacques-de-Dupuy, the United Townships of La Reine-et-Desmeloizes and other unorganized territories.
- 15 September: Creation of the Municipality of Grande-Vallée.
- 27 September: Creation of the Village of Henryville from territories taken from the Parish of Saint-Georges.
- 30 September: Creation of the Village of Prévost from territories taken from the Parish of Saint-Sauveur.
- 12 November: The Parish of Saint-Pierre-de-la-Pointe-aux-Esquimaux became the Municipality of **Havre-Saint-Pierre**.

=== 1928 ===
- 11 January: Creation of the Village of Causapscal from territories taken from the Parish of Saint-Jacques-le-Majeur-de-Causapscal.
- 10 March: The Municipality of Nédélec changed its name to **Notre-Dame-du-Nord**.
- 13 March: Creation of the Village of Sainte-Marthe from territories taken from the Parish of Sainte-Marthe.
- 22 March: Creation of the Town of Racine from territories taken from the Parish of Saint-Dominique-de-Jonquières and the Township of Tremblay.
- 16 April: Creation of the Parish of Saint-Michel-du-Squatec.
- 28 April: Creation of the Parish of Notre-Dame-du-Saint-Rosaire from territories taken from the Parish of **Saint-Joachim** and the Parish of Sainte-Anne-de-Beaupré.
- 8 September: The Parish of Notre-Dame-du-Saint-Rosaire became the Municipality of Beaupré.
- 11 September: Creation of the Municipality of **Mont-Saint-Michel** from territories taken from the Township of Décarie and the United Townships of Wurtele-Moreau-et-Gravel.
- 19 October: Creation of the Municipality of Pointe-du-Lac from territories taken from the Municipality of Pointe-du-Lac.

=== 1929 ===
- 1 January: The Village of Amiante is annexed by the City of **Thetford Mines**.
- 18 March: Creation of the Municipality of Saint-François-de-Pabos from territories taken from the Municipality of Pabos.
- 27 April: The Township of Watford West became the Municipality of **Saint-Prosper**.
- 25 June: Creation of the Village of **Abercorn** from territories taken from the Township of Sutton.
- 13 July: The Village of Saint-Paul changed its name to **Saint-Pierre**.
- 5 August: Creation of the Municipality of Grande-Entrée from territories taken from the Municipality of **Grosse-Île**.
- 6 August: Creation of the Village of Saint-Évariste-Station from territories taken from the Municipality of Saint-Évariste-de-Forsyth.
- 14 September: Creation of the Municipality of **Taschereau** from territories taken from the Township of Privat.
- 23 September: Creation of the Municipality of **Saint-Jacques-de-Leeds** from territories taken from the Township of Leeds.
- 28 September: Creation of the Municipality of Saint-Émile from territories taken from the Parish of Saint-Ambroise.
- 19 October:
  - Creation of the Village of Grandes-Bergeronnes from territories taken from the Township of Bergeronnes.
  - Creation of the Village of Valcourt from territories taken from the Township of Ely.
- 9 November: Creation of the Municipality of Grande-Cascapédia from territories taken from the Township of New Richmond.

=== 1930 ===
- 18 January: The United Townships of Wurtele-Moreau-et-Gravel became the Parish of Ferme-Neuve.
- 8 February: The Township of Kensington became the Municipality of **Déléage**.
- 4 April:
  - Creation of the Town of Beauceville-Est from territories taken from the Town of **Beauceville**.
  - The Town of Chicoutimi became a City.
- 14 April:
  - Creation of the Municipality of **Palmarolle** from territories taken from the Township of La Sarre and other unorganized territoires.
  - Creation of the Village of Lorrainville from territories taken from the Parish of Notre-Dame-de-Lourdes-de-Lorrainville.
- 15 April: Creation of the Municipality of Shipshaw from territories taken from the Township of Tremblay.
- 10 May:
  - The Municipality of Est-de-la-Paroisse-de-Sainte-Flore is annexed by the City of Grand-Mère.
  - Creation of the Municipality of Nicolet-Sud from territories taken from the Parish of Saint-Jean-Baptiste-de-Nicolet.
  - Creation of the Village of Albanel from territories taken from the Township of Albanel.
- 23 May:
  - Creation of the Village of Lac-Bouchette from territories taken from the Municipality of Saint-Thomas-d’Aquin.
  - Creation of the Village of Plage-Laval from territories taken from the Municipality of Sainte-Rose.
- 31 May: The Township of Maniwaki became a Village.
- 2 August: Creation of the Municipality of **Sainte-Monique** from territories taken from the Municipality of **Saint-Henri-de-Taillon**.
- 6 September: Creation of the Municipality of **Sainte-Thérèse-de-Gaspé** from territories taken from the Municipality of Anse-du-Cap.
- 15 October: Creation of the Municipality of La Manaza from territories taken from the Township of Marchand.
- 20 December: Creation of the Village of Mistassini from territories taken from the Municipality of Saint-Michel-de-Mistassini.

=== 1931 ===
- 7 March: Creation of the Parish of Sainte-Séraphine from territories taken from the Municipality of Kingsey, the Parish of Saint-Albert-de-Warwick, the Parish of Sainte-Clothilde-de-Horton and the Parish of Sainte-Elizabeth-de-Warwick.
- 25 April: The Municipality of Lacaille changed its name to Bellerive.
- 9 May: Creation of the Village of Saint-Joseph-de-la-Rive from territories taken from the Parish of L’Assomption-de-la-Sainte-Vierge.
- 16 May: The Municipality of Bouchette-Sud changed its name to **Blue Sea**.
- 21 May: The Village of Sacré-Cœur-de-Jésus became the Municipality of **East Broughton**.
- 4 July: The Township of Saint-Paul-de-Mille-Vaches became the Municipality Saint-Paul-du-Nord.
- 11 July: The Village of **Cowansville** became a Town.
- 25 July: The Village of Sainte-Cécile is annexed by the City of **Salaberry-de-Valleyfield**.
- 10 October: Creation of the Village of Maskinongé from territories taken from the Municipality of Maskinongé.
- 24 October:
  - Creation of the Municipality of Métabetchouan from territories taken from the Parish of Saint-Louis-de-Chambord.
  - The Parish of Saint-Octave-de-Métis became the Municipality of **Grand-Métis**.
  - The Municipality of Saint-Octave-de-Métis-Sud became the Parish of **Saint-Octave-de-Métis**.
  - Creation of the Municipality of **Saint-Stanislas** from territories taken from the Municipality of Saint-Michel-de-Mistassini and other unorganized territories.
  - The Parish of Cœur-Très-Pur-de-la-Bienheureuse-Vierge-Marie-de-Plaisance became the Municipality of **Plaisance**.
- 31 October: Creation of the Village of Avenir from territories taken from the Municipality of **L'Avenir**.
- 19 December: Creation of the Village of Grande-Rivière from territories taken from the Municipality of Grande-Rivière.
- 26 December: The Municipality of Talon changed its name to **Lac-Frontière**.

=== 1932 ===
- 2 January: Creation of the Municipality of Mont-Lebel from territories taken from the Parish of Sainte-Blandine.
- 23 January: Creation of the Municipality of **Ogden** from territories taken from the Township of **Stanstead**.
- 6 February:
  - Creation of the Municipality of Grande-Île from territories taken from the Municipality of Nouveau-Salaberry.
  - Creation of the Municipality of Saint-Agricole from territories taken from the Township of Wolfe.
- 19 February:
  - The Municipality of Jeanne-d’Arc is annexed by the Municipality of **Sainte-Monique**.
  - The Municipality of Metgermette-Nord changed its name to **Sainte-Aurélie**.
  - The Village of Plage-Laval became a Town.
  - The Township of Metgermette-Nord became the Municipality of **Saint-Zacharie**.
- 16 April:
  - The Parish of Saint-Louis-de-Chambord became the Village of Chambord.
  - The Township of MacNider became the Municipality of **Baie-des-Sables**.
- 11 June: Creation of the Municipality of Petite-Rivière-Ouest from territories taken from the Municipality of Grande-Rivière.
- 16 July: Creation of the Municipality of **Stanstead-Est** from territories taken from the Township of **Stanstead**.
- 29 October: Creation of the Municipality of Saint-Félix-de-Dalquier from territories taken from the United Townships of Figuery-et-Dalquier.
- 12 November: The Municipality of Petite-Rivière-Ouest changed its name to Grande-Rivière-Ouest.
- 24 November: The Municipality of Bishop's Crossing changed its name to Bishopton.

=== 1933 ===
- 21 January: Creation of the Municipality of Taschereau-Fortier from territories taken from the Parish of Saint-Maxime.
- 4 February: Creation of the Municipality of Saint-François-Ouest from territories taken from the Parish of Saint-François.
- 11 March:
  - Creation of the Municipality of Bridgeville from territories taken from the Municipality of Percé and the Parish of Saint-Pierre-de-la-Malbaie-Numéro-Un.
  - Creation of the Village of Saint-Sébastien from territories taken from the Township of Aylmer.
- 13 April:
  - Creation of the Town of **Duparquet**.
  - Creation of the Town of Val-Saint-Michel from territories taken from the Parish of Saint-Gérard-Magella.
- 5 August: The Township of Fox became the Municipality of Rivière-au-Renard.
- 9 September: Creation of the Parish of **Saint-Adelme** from territories taken from the Municipality of Matane and the Parish of Sainte-Félicité.
- 18 November: Creation of the Village of Gatineau from territories taken from the Municipality of Templeton-Ouest.

=== 1934 ===
- 13 February: The Municipality of Métabetchouan became the Parish of Saint-Louis-de-Chambord.
- 20 April: Creation of the Town of Bourlamaque.

=== 1935 ===
- 16 February: Creation of the Municipality of Clermont from territories taken from the Parish of Saint-Étienne-de-Murray-Bay and the Parish of Sainte-Agnès.
- 6 March: Creation of the Parish of Saint-Denis-de-Brompton from territories taken from the Parish of Saint-Élie-d’Orford, the Parish of Saint-François-Xavier-de-Brompton, the Township of Brompton and the Township of **Orford**.
- 11 April: Creation of the Township of De Sales.
- 13 April: The Municipality of Anse-du-Cap changed its name to Cap-d’Espoir.
- 18 June: The Village of Sainte-Geneviève is annexed by the Village of Sainte-Geneviève-de-Pierrefonds.
- 13 July: Creation of the Village of Brownsburg from territories taken from the Township of Chatham.
- 31 August: Creation of the Village of Val-d’Or.
- 14 September: Creation of the Village of **Stukely-Sud** from territories taken from the Municipality of South-Stukely.

=== 1936 ===
- 10 January: The Town of **Drummondville** became a City.
- 4 March: Creation of the Township of **Clermont**.
- 21 March: Creation of the Village of Saint-Augustin from territories taken from the Parish of Saint-Augustin.
- 23 May: Creation of the Municipality of Saint-Bernard-de-l’Île-aux-Coudres from territories taken from the Parish of Saint-Louis-de-l’Isle-aux-Coudres.
- 10 June: Creation of the Town of **Lac-Saint-Joseph** from territories taken from the Parish of Sainte-Catherine.
- 15 August: Creation of the Municipality of **Duhamel** from territories taken from the United Townships of Hartwell-et-Preston.
- 31 October: Creation of the Municipality of Grantham-Ouest from territories taken from the Township of Grantham.
- 21 November: Creation of the Municipality of Hope-Est from territories taken from the Township of **Hope**.

=== 1937 ===
- 21 January: Creation of the Municipality of Sacré-Coeur-de-Jésus-Village from territories taken from the Parish of Sacré-Coeur-de-Jésus.
- 30 January: Creation of the Municipality of Beauport-Ouest from territories taken from the Municipality of Beauport.
- 6 March: Creation of the Village of La Sarre from territories taken from the Township of La Sarre.
- 29 April: Creation of the Township of Sicotte.
- 8 May: The Village of Asbestos became a Town.
- 20 May:
  - Creation of the Town of **Baie-Comeau**.
  - The Village of **Val-d'Or** became a Town.
- 31 July: Creation of the Municipality of Saint-Paul-de-Châteauguay from territories taken from the Parish of Sainte-Martine.
- 7 August: Creation of the Municipality of Ascot-Nord from territories taken from the Township of Ascot.
- 19 August: The Village of Saint-Joseph-de-Grantham became a Town.
- 18 September: Creation of the Municipality of Saint-Simon-de-Drummond from territories taken from the Township of Grantham and the Township of Wickham.
- 30 October: Creation of the Parish of Sainte-Catherine-d’Alexandrie-de-Laprairie from territories taken from the Municipality of Laprairie and the Parish of Saint-Constant.
- 13 November:
  - Creation of the Municipality of Sainte-Sophie from territories taken from the Township of Halifax-Nord.
  - Creation of the Parish of Tadoussac from territories taken from the Parish of Sacré-Coeur-de-Jésus.
- 4 December: Creation of the Parish of Saint-Tharcisius from territories taken from the Parish of Saint-Benoît-Joseph-Labre and other unorganized territories.
- 28 December: The Village of Saint-Jérôme-de-Matane became the Town of **Matane**.

=== 1938 ===
- 19 February: Creation of the Parish of Saint-Janvier.
- 14 May:
  - Creation of the Municipality of **Grand-Saint-Esprit** from territories taken from the Parish of Sainte-Monique.
  - Creation of the Parish of **Saint-Lambert** from territories taken from the United Townships of La Reine-et-Desmeloizes.
- 11 June: Creation of the Parish of **Saint-Marc-du-Lac-Long**.
- 30 July: The Municipality of Roquemaure changed its name to Sainte-Jeanne-de-Clerval.
- 3 September: Creation of the Municipality of Saint-Edmond from territories taken from the Municipality of **Saint-Thomas-Didyme**, the Township of Normandin and other unorganized territories.
- 5 November: Creation of the Municipality of **Austin** from territories taken from the Municipality of **Bolton-Est**.
- 19 November:
  - Creation of the Municipality of Rivière-Malbaie from territories taken from the Parish of Saint-Étienne-de-Murray-Bay.
  - Creation of the Municipality of Saint-Elzéar from territories taken from the Municipality of Saint-David-d’Escourt and the Parish of **Saint-Louis-du-Ha! Ha!**.
  - Creation of the Municipality of Sainte-Clothilde-de-Beauce from territories taken from the Municipality of Saint-Éphrem-de-Tring, the Municipality of Saint-Victor-de-Tring, the Parish of **Sacré-Cœur-de-Jésus** and the Parish of Sacré-Cœur-de-Marie.
- 26 November: Creation of the Municipality of Saint-Joseph-de-Beauce from territories taken from the Parish of Saint-Joseph-de-la-Beauce.

=== 1939 ===
- 21 January: Creation of the Village of Les Becquets from territories taken from the Parish of Saint-Pierre-les-Becquets.
- 28 January: Creation of the Village of Deschaillons-sur-Saint-Laurent from territories taken from the Village of Deschaillons.
- 16 March: Creation of the Municipality of **Saint-Benoît-du-Lac** from territories taken from the Municipality of **Austin**.
- 30 March: The Village of Fermont is annexed by the Parish of **Saint-Maurice**.
- 1 April: Creation of the Municipality of **Val-Saint-Gilles** from territories taken from the Township of **Clermont**.
- 28 April: Creation of the Town of **Malartic**.
- 29 April: Creation of the Village of Saint-Pascal from territories taken from the Parish of Saint-Paschal-de-Kamouraska.
- 27 May:
  - Creation of the Municipality of **Saint-Étienne-de-Bolton** from territories taken from the Municipality of **Bolton-Est**.
  - Creation of the Municipality of **Saint-Gabriel-Lalemant** from territories taken from the Parish of Saint-Pacôme.
- 17 June: Creation of the Village of Rimouski-Est from territories taken from the Town of **Rimouski** and the Parish of **Saint-Anaclet-de-Lessard**.
- 23 June: The Township of Howard became the Municipality of **Saint-Adolphe-d’Howard**.
- 19 August: Creation of the Municipality of **Grosses-Roches** from territories taken from the Parish of Sainte-Félicité.

=== 1940 ===
- 2 March: The Municipality of Partie-Sud-du-Canton-de-Masham changed its name to Sainte-Cécile-de-Masham.
- 17 May: Creation of the Municipality of Mont-Tremblant from territories taken from the Township of Clyde and the United Townships of DeSalaberry-et-Grandison.
- 1 June: The Township of Armand became the Municipality of Saint-Honoré.
- 8 June: Creation of the Village of Saint-Sylvère from territories taken from the Parish of Saint-Sylvère.
- 27 July: Creation of the Village of Norbertville from territories taken from the Parish of Saint-Norbert-d’Arthabaska.
- 26 October: Creation of the Municipality of **Chute-Saint-Philippe** from territories taken from the Parish of Ferme-Neuve and other unorganized territories.
- 21 December: Creation of the Village of Cadillac and the Village of Pascalis.

=== 1941 ===
- 4 January: Creation of the Village of La Patrie from territories taken from the Township of Ditton.
- 20 March: Creation of the Town of Ville-des-Iles-Laval from territories taken from the Parish of Sainte-Dorothée.
- 10 May: Creation of the Parish of **Sainte-Hélène-de-Mancebourg**.
- 20 September: Creation of the Village of Saint-Félix from territories taken from the Municipality of Grantham-Ouest.
- 15 November: The Village of Saint-Félix is annexed by the Municipality of Grantham-Ouest.

=== 1942 ===
- 1 January:
  - Re-Creation of the Village of Saint-Félix from territories taken from the Municipality of Grantham-Ouest.
  - Creation of the Parish of **Sainte-Rose-du-Nord** from territories taken from the Parish of Saint-Fulgence.
- 13 May: Creation of the Town of **Belleterre**.
- 29 May:
  - The Town of Berthier changed its name to **Berthierville**.
  - Creation of the Town of Oka-sur-le-Lac from territories taken from the Municipality of L’Annonciation.
- 27 June: The Township of Grantham became the Municipality of Saint-Jean-Baptiste.
- 29 August: The Municipality of Nord-Est-des-Cantons-de-Wabassee-Dudley-et-Bouthiller changed its name to Nord-Est-des-Cantons-Dudley-et-Bouthiller.
- 26 December: The Village of Saint-Joseph became the Town of **Saint-Joseph-de-Sorel**.

=== 1943 ===
- 1 January:
  - Creation of the Village of Saint-Georges-Ouest from territories taken from the Parish of Saint-Georges.
  - Creation of the Parish of Saint-Mathieu from territoires taken from the United Townships of Figuery-et-Dalquier and other unorganized territories.
  - Creation of the Parish of Sainte-Odile-sur-Rimouski from territories taken from the Parish of Saint-Germain-de-Rimouski.
  - Creation of the Parish of **Saints-Martyrs-Canadiens** from territories taken from the Parish of Saint-Fortunat-de-Wolfestown, the Parish of **Saint-Jacques-le-Majeur-de-Wolfestown**, the Parish of Saint-Joseph-de-Ham-Sud, the Township of Garthby and the Township of Ham-Nord.
- 3 July: The Village of Saint-Félix changed its name to Drummondville-Ouest.

=== 1944 ===
- 1 January:
  - Creation of the Municipality of **Saint-Janvier-de-Joly** from territories taken from the Parish of **Saint-Édouard-de-Lotbinière**.
  - Creation of the Parish of **Sainte-Praxède** from territories taken from the Municipality of D’Israëli, the Municipality of Lambton and the Township of **Stratford**.
  - Creation of the Village of Naudville from territories taken from the Municipality of Saint-Joseph-d’Alma.
- 22 January: The Town of Racine is annexed by the City of Arvida.
- 26 February: The Township of Wolfe became the Municipality of Saint-Faustin.
- 4 May: Creation of the Town of **Forestville** from territories taken from the United Townships of Sainte-Anne-de-Portneuf.
- 30 June:
  - The Municipality of Durham changed its name to **Ulverton**.
  - The Village of Saint-Jean-Baptiste-de-Bélisle changed its name to **Val-David**.
- 14 October: The Municipality of Cap-des-Rosiers changed its name to Grande-Grève.
- 21 October: The Municipality of Nouveau-Salaberry is annexed by the City of **Salaberry-de-Valleyfield**.
- 10 November: The Township of Wickham became the Municipality of Saint-Nicéphore.

=== 1945 ===
- 1 January:
  - Creation of the Municipality of **Normétal** from territories taken from the Municipality of Saint-Jacques-de-Dupuy and the Parish of **Saint-Lambert**.
  - Creation of the Village of Crabtree from territories taken from the Parish of Sacré-Cœur-de-Jésus.
  - Creation of the Parish of **Saint-René**.
- 20 January: The Municipality of Beauport changed its name to Sainte-Thérèse-de-Lisieux.
- 7 April: The United Townships of Wabassee-Dudley-et-Bouthillier became the Municipality of **Notre-Dame-de-Pontmain**.
- 24 May:
  - Creation of the Village of Angliers from territories taken from the Municipality of **Saint-Eugène-de-Guigues** and the Township of **Guérin**.
  - The Village of Petit-Lac-Magog changed its name to Deauville.
- 2 June: The Village of Priceville changed its name to **Price**.
- 16 June: The Village of Saint-Moïse changed its name to **Saint-Noël**.
- 30 June: The Parish of Saint-Méthode-d'Adstock became the Municipality of Saint-Méthode-de-Frontenac.
- 1 July: The Village of **Mont-Joli** became a Town.

=== 1946 ===
- 1 January:
  - Creation of the Municipality of **Barnston-Ouest** from territories taken from the Township of Barnston.
  - Creation of the Municipality of **Colombier** from territories taken from the United Townships of Sainte-Anne-de-Portneuf.
  - Creation of the Municipality of **Saint-Jean-de-Brébeuf** from territories taken from the Municipality of Inverness, the Township of Halifax-Sud, the Township of Ireland-Nord and the Township of Leeds.
  - Creation of the Municipality of **Sainte-Thérèse-de-la-Gatineau** from territories taken from the Township of Cameron.
  - Creation of the Municipality of Sainte-Thérèse-Ouest from territories taken from the Parish of Sainte-Thérèse-de-Blainville.
  - Creation of the Village of Saint-Germain-de-Grantham from territories taken from the Parish of Saint-Germain.
- 2 February: The United Townships of Bigelow-Wells-Blake-et-McGill became the Municipality of **Notre-Dame-du-Laus**.
- 9 February: The Township of Somerset-Sud became the Parish of Plessisville.
- 28 March: The Parish of Sainte-Jeanne-de-l’Isle-Perrot became the Municipality of Île-Perrot.
- 27 April: The Township of Clyde became the Municipality of **La Conception**.
- 22 June: The Village of Montmorency became a Town.
- 1 July: Creation of the Parish of **Sainte-Anne-des-Lacs** from territories taken from the Parish of Saint-Sauveur.
- 24 August: The Municipality of Saint-Joseph-de-Beauce changed its name to **Saint-Joseph-des-Érables**.
- 31 August: The Township of Clifton became the Municipality of **Martinville**.
- 5 October: The Parish of Sainte-Théodosie changed its name to Sainte-Théodosie-Calixa-Lavallée.
- 26 October: The Village of **Saint-Félicien** became a Town.
- 16 November: The Village of **Gatineau** became a Town.

=== 1947 ===
- 1 January:
  - Creation of the Municipality of **Biencourt**.
  - Creation of the Municipality of Douville from territories taken from the Parish of Saint-Hyacinthe.
  - Creation of the Municipality of Lac-Saint-Charles from territories taken from the Parish of Notre-Dame-des-Laurentides.
  - Creation of the Municipality of **Sainte-Françoise** from territories taken from the Municipality of **Villeroy** and the Parish of Sainte-Philomène-de-Fortierville.
  - Creation of the Municipality of Shannon from territories taken from the Parish of Sainte-Catherine.
  - Creation of the Village of **Mont-Saint-Pierre** from territories taken from the Municipality of **Saint-Maxime-du-Mont-Louis**.
  - Creation of the Village of Saint-Fulgence from territories taken from the Parish of Saint-Fulgence.
  - Creation of the Village of Saint-Grégoire-de-Greenlay from territories taken from the Parish of Saint-François-Xavier-de-Brompton.
  - Creation of the Village of Sainte-Dorothée from territories taken from the Parish of Sainte-Dorothée.
  - Creation of the Village of Sault-au-Mouton from territories taken from the Municipality of Saint-Paul-du-Nord.
  - Creation of the Parish of Rosemère from territories taken from the Parish of Sainte-Thérèse-de-Blainville.
  - Creation of the Parish of Saint-Georges-Est from territories taken from the Parish of Saint-Georges.
- 1 February: The Village of Saint-Faustin-Station changed its name to Lac-Carré.
- 20 March: Creation of the Village of Parent.
- 26 April: The Village of Loretteville became a Town.
- 10 May:
  - The Municipality of Pont-Viau became a Town.
  - The Village of L'Abord-à-Plouffe became a Town.
  - The Parish of Longueuil is split into the Town of Jacques-Cartier and the Town of Mackayville.
  - The Parish of Saint-Colomb-de-Sillery became the City of Sillery.
- 7 June: The Township of Bégon became the Municipality of **Saint-Jean-de-Dieu**.
- 18 October: The Municipality of Sainte-Florence-de-Beaurivage changed its name to **Sainte-Florence**.
- 29 November: The Village of Mistassini became a Town.
- 13 December: The Municipality of Ouest-du-Canton-de-la-Motte changed its name to **La Motte**.

=== 1948 ===
- 1 January:
  - Creation of the Municipality of Évain.
  - Creation of the Municipality of Lac-des-Aigles.
  - Creation of the Municipality of **Lantier** from territories taken from the Township of Doncaster.
  - Creation of the Municipality of Lesage from territories taken from the Municipality of Saint-Jérôme, the Village of Shawbridge and the Township of Abercrombie.
  - Creation of the Municipality of Raudot.
  - Creation of the Municipality of **Saint-David-de-Falardeau** from territories taken from the Parish of Saint-Honoré.
  - Creation of the Municipality of Saint-Jacques-de-Horton from territories taken from the Parish of Sainte-Clothilde-de-Horton.
  - Creation of the Municipality of **Saint-Ludger-de-Milot**.
  - Creation of the Village of Barraute from territories taken from the United Townships of Fiedmont-et-Barraute.
  - Creation of the Village of Notre-Dame-de-Lorette from territories taken from the Parish of Ancienne-Lorette.
  - Creation of the Village of Saint-Basile-Sud from territories taken from the Parish of Saint-Basile.
  - Creation of the Parish of Notre-Dame-de-l’Île-Perrot from territories taken from the Municipality of Île-Perrot.
  - The Township of Senneterre became a Village.
- 7 February: The Township of De Sales became the Municipality of **Notre-Dame-des-Monts**.
- 11 March:
  - Creation of the City of Rouyn by the merger of the Town of Mercier and the Town of Rouyn.
  - Creation of the Town of Préville from territories taken from the Town of Jacques-Cartier.
  - The Village of Cadillac became a Town.
  - The Village of **Saint-Eustache** became a Town.
- 22 March:
  - The Town of **Beauharnois** became a City.
  - The Town of Noranda became a City.
- 17 April: The Village of Est-de-Saint-Georges-de-Beauce became the Town of **Saint-Georges**.
- 29 May: The Village of Saint-Benoît-Joseph-Labre changed its name to Amqui.
- 1 June:
  - Creation of the Town of Châteauguay Heights from territories taken from the Town of **Châteauguay**.
  - Creation of the Municipality of **Milan** from territories taken from the Municipality of Winslow-Sud, the Township of **Hampden**, the Township of **Lingwick**, the Township of **Marston** and the Township of Whitton.
- 1 July: Creation of the Municipality of Lanoraie-d'Autray from territories taken from the Parish of Saint-Joseph-de-Lanoraie.
- 18 September:
  - The Village of Almaville changed its name to Shawinigan-Sud.
  - The Village of Saint-Georges-Ouest became a Town.
  - The Parish of Saint-Malachie-de-Frampton changed its name to **Saint-Malachie**.
- 13 November: The Township of Bois became the Municipality of **Rivière-à-Pierre**.

=== 1949 ===
- 1 January:
  - The Municipality of Clermont became a Village.
  - Creation of the Municipality of Saint-Jules from territories taken from the Township of Maria and other unorganized territories.
  - Creation of the Municipality of **Saint-Médard**.
  - Creation of the Municipality of **Saint-Robert-Bellarmin** from territories taken from the Parish of Saint-Gédéon and the United Townships of Risborough-et-Marlow.
  - Creation of the Village of Notre-Dame-du-Lac from territories taken from the Parish of Notre-Dame-du-Lac.
  - Creation of the Village of Saint-Maurice-de-Bois-Filion from territories taken from the Municipality of Terrebonne and the Parish of Sainte-Thérèse-de-Blainville.
  - Creation of the Village of **Sainte-Jeanne-d’Arc** from territories taken from the Parish of Sainte-Jeanne-d’Arc.
  - Creation of the Village of Sainte-Rosalie from territories taken from the Parish of Sainte-Rosalie.
  - Creation of the Parish of Saint-Antoine-des-Laurentides from territories taken from the Municipality of Saint-Jérôme.
- 26 February: The United Townships of La Reine-et-Desmeloizes became the Municipality of **La Reine**.
- 10 March:
  - Creation of the Town of LeMoyne from territories taken from the Town of Jacques-Cartier.
  - Creation of the Village of Fossambault-sur-le-Lac from territories taken from the Parish of Sainte-Catherine.
  - The Parish of Saint-Foye became the Town of Sainte-Foy.
- 9 April: The Parish of Tadoussac is closed and dissolved.
- 23 April: The Parish of Saint-Jean-Baptiste-des-Écureuils became the Municipality of Les Écureuils.
- 30 April: The Village of Saint-Maurice-de-Bois-Filion changed its name to Bois-des-Filions.
- 18 June: The United Townships of Figuery-et-Dalquier became the Municipality of Amos-Ouest.
- 1 July:
  - Creation of the Village of Sainte-Anne-du-Lac from territories taken from the Parish of Sacré-Cœur-de-Marie.
  - Creation of the Parish of Lac-Paré from territories taken from the Township of Chertsey.
- 9 July: The Village of Saint-Évariste-Station changed its name to Guadeloupe.
- 10 September: The Village of Enfant-Jésus became the Municipality of Vallée-Jonction.
- 17 September: The Village of **La Sarre** became a Town.
- 5 November: The Village of Charlesbourg became a City.
- 12 November: The Village of **Saint-Rémi** became a Town.
- 24 December: The Township of **Senneterre** became a Parish.

=== 1950 ===
- 1 January:
  - Creation of the Municipality of Compton-Station from territories taken from the Township of Compton.
  - Creation of the Municipality of **Lac-des-Plages** from territories taken from the Township of **Amherst** and the United Townships of Suffolk-et-Addington.
  - Creation of the Municipality of Mont-Saint-Hilaire from territories taken from the Parish of Saint-Hilaire.
  - Creation of the Municipality of **Notre-Dame-de-la-Merci**.
  - Creation of the Municipality of **Saint-Aimé-des-Lacs** from territories taken from the Municipality of **Notre-Dame-des-Monts** and the Parish of Saint-Agnès.
  - Creation of the Municipality of **Saint-Alfred** from territories taken from the Municipality of Saint-François-Ouest, the Municipality of Saint-Victor-de-Tring and the Parish of Saint-Benoît-Labre.
  - Creation of the Municipality of Saint-Édouard from territories taken from the Parish of **Saint-Didace**, the Parish of Saint-Justin and the Parish of Sainte-Ursule.
  - Creation of the Municipality of **Saint-François-Xavier-de-Viger** from territories taken from the Parish of Saint-Épiphane and the Parish of Saint-Hubert.
  - Creation of the Municipality of Saint-Luc-de-Laval from territories taken from the United Townships of Sainte-Anne-de-Portneuf.
  - Creation of the Municipality of **Saint-Simon-les-Mines** from territories taken from the Municipality of **Saint-Benjamin**, the Parish of Notre-Dame-de-la-Providence, the Parish of Saint-François and the Parish of Saint-Georges-Est.
  - Creation of the Municipality of **Sainte-Félicité** from territories taken from the Municipality of Saint-Pamphile, the Municipality of **Sainte-Perpétue** and the United Townships of Casgrain-et-Leverrier.
  - Creation of the Municipality of **Val-Alain** from territories taken from the Parish of Sainte-Emmélie-de-Lotbinière.
  - Creation of the Municipality of **Venise-en-Québec** from territories taken from the Parish of Saint-Georges-de-Clarenceville.
  - Creation of the Village of Armagh from territories taken from the Parish of Saint-Cajetan-d’Armagh.
  - Creation of the Village of Cap-aux-Meules from territories taken from the Municipality of Étang-du-Nord.
  - Creation of the Village of L’Islet-Station from territories taken from the Municipality of Islet.
  - Creation of the Village of **Marsoui** from territories taken from the Municipality of Christie and the Municipality of Duchesnay.
  - The Village of **Mont-Laurier** became a Town.
  - Creation of the Village of Paincourt from territories taken from the Municipality of Île-Perrot.
  - Creation of the Village of Saint-Gédéon from territories taken from the Parish of Saint-Gédéon.
  - Creation of the Village of Saint-Placide from territories taken from the Parish of Saint-Placide.
  - Creation of the Village of Sainte-Anne-du-Lac from territories taken from the Township of Décarie.
- 29 March:
  - Creation of the Town of Hauterive.
  - Creation of the Municipality of La Rochelle from territories taken from the Municipality of Tingwick.
  - The Parish of Saint-Léonard-de-Port-Maurice became the Municipality of **Saint-Léonard-de-Portneuf**.
- 1 April: The Township of Morin became the Municipality of **Morin-Heights**.
- 5 April:
  - The Town of **Magog** became a City.
  - The Town of **Saint-Jérôme** became a City.
- 6 May: The Parish of Sainte-Rose-de-Lima changed its name to Sainte-Rose-Est.
- 8 July: The Municipality of Figuery-et-Dalquier changed its name to Amos-Est.
- 7 October: The Village of Paincourt changed its name to Pincourt.
- 25 November: The Township of Somerset-Nord became the Municipality of Sainte-Julie.

=== 1951 ===
- 1 January:
  - The Town of Plage-Laval changed its name to Laval-Ouest.
  - Creation of the Municipality of Havre-Aubert-Est from territories taken from the Municipality of Havre-Aubert.
  - Creation of the Municipality of La Baleine from territories taken from the Parish of Saint-Louis-de-l’Isle-aux-Coudres.
  - Creation of the Municipality of La Nativité-de-Laprairie from territories taken from the Municipality of Laprairie.
  - Creation of the Municipality of **Lac-Édouard**.
  - Creation of the Village of Aston-Jonction from territories taken from the Parish of Saint-Raphaël.
  - Creation of the Village of Deschambault from territories taken from the Municipality of Deschambault.
  - Creation of the Village of **Laurier-Station** from territories taken from the Parish of Saint-Flavien.
- 17 February: The United Townships of Fiedmont-et-Barraute became a Municipality.
- 7 March: Creation of the Village of **Chute-aux-Outardes** and the Parish of **Ragueneau** from territories taken from the Municipality of Sept-Cantons-Unis-de-Saguenay.
- 14 March: Creation of the Town of **Sept-Îles** from territories taken from the Township of Letellier.
- 17 March: The Parish of Notre-Dame-de-Bonsecours became the Municipality of **Fassett**.
- 28 April: The Municipality of Sainte-Jeanne-de-Clerval changed its name to **Clerval**.
- 12 May: The Municipality of Saindon became the Village of Sayabec.
- 16 June: The Village of Beauport-Est changed its name to Villeneuve.
- 27 October: The Township of Abercrombie became the Parish of Saint-Hippolyte.
- 19 December:
  - The Town of Jacques-Cartier became a City.
  - The Town of Lauzon became a City.
  - The Village of **Côte-Saint-Luc** became a Town.

=== 1952 ===
- 1 January:
  - Creation of the Municipality of Fleuriault from territories taken from the Parish of Saint-Gabriel.
  - Creation of the Municipality of Les Boules from territories taken from the Municipality of **Baie-des-Sables** and the Parish of **Saint-Octave-de-Métis**.
  - The Municipality of Notre-Dame-des-Quinze-du-Canton-Guigues is annexed by the Municipality of **Notre-Dame-du-Nord**.
  - Creation of the Municipality of Pabos Mills from territories taken from the Municipality of Newport and the Municipality of Pabos.
  - Creation of the Municipality of **Roquemaure**.
  - Creation of the Municipality of Saint-Jean-Baptiste-de-l’Isle-Verte from territories taken from the Municipality of Isle-Verte.
  - Creation of the Municipality of **Terrasse-Vaudreuil** from territories taken from the Municipality of Île-Perrot.
  - Creation of the Village of Ayersville from territories taken from the Township of Chatham.
  - Creation of the Village of Saint-Damase from territories taken from the Parish of Saint-Damase.
  - Creation of the Village of Saint-Jean-Vianney from territories taken from the Municipality of Shipshaw.
- 23 January:
  - Creation of the Town of Saint-Vincent-de-Paul from territories taken from the Municipality of Saint-Vincent-de-Paul.
  - The Village of Chambly became the Town of Fort-Chambly.
- 9 March: The Town of Ville-Saint-Michel became the City of Saint-Michel.
- 10 May: The United Townships of Royal-Roussillon-et-Poularies became the Municipality of Royal-Roussillon-de-Macamic.
- 27 September: The United Townships of Dalibaire-et-Romieu became the Municipality of **Les Méchins**.
- 25 October: The Village of Bassin-de-Chambly became the Town of Chambly.
- 31 October: The Municipality of Laprairie changed its name to Notre-Dame.
- 8 November: Creation of the Village of Chibougamau.
- 6 December: The Municipality of La-Nativité-de-Laprairie became the Parish of Laprairie.

=== 1953 ===
- 1 January:
  - Creation of the Municipality of Charlesbourg-Ouest from territories taken from the Parish of Charlesbourg.
  - Creation of the Municipality of **Moffet** from territories taken from the United Townships of **Latulipe-et-Gaboury** and other unorganized territories.
  - Creation of the Municipality of Sainte-Monique-des-Saules from territories taken from the Parish of Ancienne-Lorette.
  - Creation of the Village of Lac-à-la-Croix from territories taken from the Parish of Sainte-Croix.
  - Creation of the Village of Omerville from territories taken from the Township of Magog.
  - Creation of the Village of Saint-Honoré from territories taken from the Parish of Saint-Honoré.
  - Creation of the Village of Shawinigan-Est from territories taken from the Parish of Sainte-Flore.
  - Creation of the Parish of **Sainte-Irène** from territories taken from the Parish of Saint-Benoît-Joseph-Labre and other unorganized territories.
- 31 January: The Parish of Saint-Hilaire became the Municipality of Otterburn Park.
- 12 February: Creation of the Village of Pointe-Calumet from territories taken from the Parish of Saint-Joseph.
- 21 March:
  - The Municipality of Nord-Est-des-Cantons-Dudley-et-Bouthiller changed its name to Saint-Aimé-du-Lac-des-Îles.
  - The Parish of Annonciation became the Municipality of **Oka**.
- 28 March: The Township of Campbell became the Municipality of Brunet.
- 2 May:
  - The Village of Lac-Saint-Louis changed its name to Melocheville.
  - The Parish of Sainte-Anne-de-Stukely became the Municipality of **Sainte-Anne-de-la-Rochelle**.
- 23 May: The Township of Est-du-Canton-de-Campbell became the Municipality of Lac-des-Écorces.
- 20 June: The Village of Saint-Alexis-de-la-Grande-Baie is annexed by the Town of Port-Alfred.
- 4 July: The Parish of Charlesbourg changed its name to Orsainville.
- 18 July: Creation of the Town of **Murdochville**.
- 25 July: The Parish of Saint-Pierre-de-la-Malbaie-Numéro-Un became the Municipality of Barachois.
- 15 August: The Township of Romieux became the Municipality of Capucins.
- 12 September: The Municipality of D'Israëli became the Parish of Disreali.
- 19 September: Creation of the Town of Barville from territories taken from the Municipality of Fiedmont-et-Barraute.
- 3 October: The Township of Lussier became the Municipality of **Saint-Donat**.
- 24 October:
  - The Municipality of Musselyville changed its name to **Saint-Alphonse**.
  - The Municipality of Portland changed its name to Portland-Ouest.
- 28 November:
  - The Municipality of Hope-Est changed its name to **Hope Town**.
  - The Village of D'Israëli changed its name to Disraeli.
- 5 December:
  - The Municipality of Partie-Ouest-du-Canton-de-Douglas changed its name to Haldimand.
  - The Municipality of Saint-Jean-l’Evangéliste changed its name to **Nouvelle**.
- 17 December: Creation of the Town of Saint-Martin from territories taken from the Parish of Saint-Martin.

=== 1954 ===
- 1 January:
  - Creation of the Municipality of **Auclair**.
  - Creation of the Municipality of Saint-Michel-des-Forges from territories taken from the Parish of Saint-Étienne and the Parish of Trois-Rivières.
  - Creation of the Municipality of **Saint-Omer** from territories taken from the Municipality of Saint-Pamphile and the Municipality of **Sainte-Perpétue**.
  - Creation of the Parish of Sainte-Germaine-de-Palmarolle from territories taken from the Municipality of **Palmarolle** and the Municipality of **Poularies**.
- 28 January: The Municipality of Rivière-des-Prairies became a Town.
- 10 February:
  - The Village of Giffard became a City.
  - The Parish of La Présentation-de-la-Sainte-Vierge changed its name to Côte-de-Liesse.
  - The Parish of Saint-Joseph became the Town of Tracy.
- 1 April: The Parish of Saint-Laurent is dissolved and its territory is split between the City of **Montréal** and the Town of Saint-Laurent.
- 10 April: The Town of Saint-Joseph-d’Alma changed its name to **Alma**.
- 1 May: Creation of the Parish of **Saint-Jean-de-Cherbourg**, the Parish of Saint-Paulin-Dalibaire and the Parish of Saint-Thomas-de-Cherbourg from territories taken from an unorganized territory formed from territories taken from the Parish of Sainte-Félicité, the former Township of Romieux and the former United Township of Dalibaire-et-Romieu.
- 15 May:
  - The Village of Naudville became a Town.
  - The Parish of Conversion-de-Saint-Paul became the Municipality of **Saint-Paul**.
  - The United Townships of Roux-Bellechasse-et-Daaquam became the Municipality of Saint-Magloire-de-Bellechasse.
- 22 May:
  - The Village of L’Islet-Station changed its name to Isletville.
  - The Village of Sainte-Anne-de-Chicoutimi became the Town of Chicoutimi-Nord.
  - The Parish of Sainte-Germaine-de-Palmarolle became the Municipality of **Sainte-Germaine-Boulé**.
- 19 June: The Township of **Bowman** became a Municipality.
- 7 August: The Municipality of Bagotville-Partie-Nord-Ouest-du-Township-de-Bagot became the Parish of Bagotville.
- 1 September: The Village of **Chibougamau** became a Town.
- 18 September: The Parish of Saint-Malachy became the Municipality of **Mayo**.
- 31 December: The Township of Kilkenny became the Municipality of **Saint-Calixte**.

=== 1955 ===
- 1 January:
  - The Municipality of Isle-Verte became the Village of L’Isle-Verte.
  - Creation of the Municipality of **Lac-du-Cerf** from territories taken from the Municipality of **Notre-Dame-de-Pontmain** and the Municipality of Saint-Aimé-du-Lac-des-Îles.
  - Creation of the Municipality of Moisie from territories taken from the Township of Letellier.
  - Creation of the Municipality of Petit-Pabos from territories taken from the Municipality of Pabos and the Municipality of Saint-François-de-Pabos.
  - Creation of the Municipality of **Rapides-des-Joachims** from territories taken from the Township of Sheen.
  - Creation of the Municipality of **Saint-Athanase**.
  - Creation of the Village of **Baie-Trinité** and the Village of **Godbout** from territories taken from the Municipality of Sept-Cantons-Unis-de-Saguenay.
  - Creation of the Village of East Broughton Station from territories taken from the Municipality of **East Broughton**.
  - Creation of the Village of Lac-des-Écorces from territories taken from the Municipality of Lac-des-Écorces.
  - Creation of the Village of Saint-André from territories taken from the Municipality of Saint-André.
  - Creation of the Village of Saint-Elzéar from territories taken from the Parish of Saint-Elzéar-de-Linière.
  - Creation of the Village of Saint-Grégoire from territories taken from the Parish of Saint-Grégoire-le-Grand.
  - Creation of the Village of Saint-Jean-Eudes from territories taken from the Municipality of Chicoutimi.
  - Creation of the Village of Sainte-Félicité from territories taken from the Parish of Sainte-Félicité.
  - Creation of the Village of Yamaska-Est from territories taken from the Village of Saint-Michel.
  - Creation of the Parish of Saint-Honoré from territories taken from the Township of Shenley.
- 10 February:
  - The Town of Saint-Laurent became a City.
  - The Town of Sainte-Foy became a City.
  - The Municipality of Petite-Rivière became the Town of La Petite-Rivière.
  - The Village of **Macamic** became a Town.
  - The Village of **Plessisville** became a Town.
- 12 February: The Town of Saint-Joseph-de-Grantham is annexed by the City of **Drummondville**.
- 19 February: The Village of Saint-Victor-de-Tring changed its name to Saint-Victor.
- 22 February: The Municipality of Île-Perrot became a Town.
- 25 June: The Municipality of Saint-Jean-Baptiste is annexed by the City of **Drummondville**.
- 16 July: The United Townships of Sainte-Anne-de-Portneuf became a Municipality.
- 1 August: Creation of the Town of **Schefferville**.
- 16 November: Creation of the Town of **Chapais**.
- 31 December:
  - The Parish of Saint-Bonaventure-de-Hamilton became the Municipality of Bonaventure.
  - The Township of Ashford became the Municipality of **Saint-Damase-de-l'Islet**.

=== 1956 ===
- 1 January:
  - Creation of the Municipality of Petite-Matane from territories taken from the Municipality of Matane and the Parish of Sainte-Félicité.
  - The Municipality of Saint-Émile became a Village.
  - Creation of the Municipality of **Sainte-Marcelline-de-Kildare** from territories taken from the Parish of Saint-Ambroise-de-Kildare.
  - Creation of the Village of Saint-Antoine-des-Laurentides from territories taken from the Parish of Saint-Antoine-des-Laurentides.
  - Creation of the Parish of **La Rédemption**.
- 21 January:
  - The Village of **Senneterre** became a Town.
  - The Village of **Warwick** became a Town.
- 2 February:
  - The Town of Jonquière became a City.
  - The Village of Villeneuve became a Town.
  - The Parish of Saint-Elzéar-de-Laval became the Town of Saint-Elzéar.
- 4 February: The Parish of Saint-Placide became the Municipality of Saint-Placide-de-Béarn.
- 18 February: The Parish of Sainte-Brigide-de-Monnoir became the Municipality of **Sainte-Brigide-d’Iberville**.
- 23 February:
  - The Town of **Dorval** became a City.
  - Creation of the Town of Mont-Gabriel from territories taken from the Parish of Saint-Sauveur and the Parish of Sainte-Adèle.
  - The Parish of Saint-Léonard-de-Port-Maurice became the Town of Anjou.
- 25 February: The Township of Settrington became the Parish of **Saint-Hilarion**.
- 11 August: The United Townships of Casgrain-et-Leverrier became the Municipality of **Saint-Adalbert**.
- 18 August: The Township of Arago became the Municipality of **Saint-Marcel**.
- 15 September: The Township of Shawenegan became the Parish of Saint-Boniface-de-Shawinigan.
- 10 November: The Parish of Saint-Ours-du-Saint-Esprit changed its name to Saint-Esprit.
- 15 December:
  - The Municipality of Saint-Éphrem-de-Tring became the Parish of Saint-Éphrem-de-Beauce.
  - The Parish of L’Assomption-de-la-Sainte-Vierge became the Municipality of **Les Éboulements**.
- 19 December: The Town of **Farnham** became a City.
- 29 December: The Town of **Roberval** became a City.

=== 1957 ===
- 1 January:
  - Creation of the Municipality of **Aguanish**.
  - Creation of the Municipality of **Petite-Vallée** from territories taken from the Township of **Cloridorme**.
  - Creation of the Municipality of Saint-Faustin-Sud from territories taken from the Municipality of Saint-Faustin.
  - Creation of the Municipality of Sainte-Marguerite.
  - Creation of the Village of **Notre-Dame-du-Bon-Conseil** from territories taken from the Parish of **Notre-Dame-du-Bon-Conseil**.
  - Creation of the Village of Saint-Théophile from territories taken from the Parish of Saint-Théophile-de-la-Beauce.
  - Creation of the Village of Sainte-Marie from territories taken from the Parish of Sainte-Marie-de-Blandford.
  - Creation of the Parish of Notre-Dame-des-Prairies and the Parish of Saint-Charles-Borromée-Sud from territories taken from the Parish of Saint-Charles-Borrommée-du-Village-d’Industrie.
- 5 January: The Municipality of Saint-Ours became a Parish.
- 21 January: The Village of Rock Island became a Town.
- 31 January:
  - Creation of the Town of **Candiac** from territories taken from the Village of Delson and the Parish of Saint-Constant.
  - The Parish of **Repentigny** became a Town.
- 9 February:
  - The Parish of Saint-Étienne-de-Murray-Bay became the Municipality of Saint-Étienne-de-la-Malbaie.
  - The Parish of Saint-Joseph-de-la-Beauce changed its name to Saint-Joseph-de-Beauce.
- 16 February: The Municipality of Wickham-Ouest changed its name to **Wickham**.
- 21 February:
  - The Municipality of Sainte-Rose became the Town of Fabreville.
  - The Village of **Delson** became a Town.
  - The Parish of Saint-Clément is annexed by the City of **Beauharnois**.
- 9 March: The Township of Whitton became the Municipality of **Nantes**.
- 16 March: The Parish of Saint-Paschal-de-Kamouraska became the Municipality of Saint-Pascal.
- 23 March: The Parish of Saint-François became the Municipality of Saint-François-de-Beauce.
- 30 March: The Parish of Saint-Charles-Borromée-Sud became the Municipality of Joliette-Sud.
- 13 April: The Village of **Saint-Raymond** became a Town.
- 18 May: The Parish of Saint-Étienne-de-Lauzon became the Municipality of Saint-Étienne.
- 25 May: The Municipality of Saint-Norbert-du-Cap-Chatte became the Parish of Saint-Norbert-du-Cap-Chat.
- 22 June: The Parish of Saint-Georges became the Municipality of **Henryville**.
- 14 July: The Village of Canrobert changed its name to L'Ange-Gardien.
- 27 July: The Parish of Sainte-Jeanne-de-Neuville became the Municipality of Sainte-Jeanne-de-Pont-Rouge.
- 31 August: The Village of Shawinigan-Est is annexed by the City of Shawinigan-Falls.
- 14 September: The Municipality of Lacorne changed its name to **Sainte-Sophie**.
- 21 September:
  - The Municipality of Escoumains changed its name to Escoumins.
  - The Parish of Saint-Raymond-de-Pennafort-de-Weedon became the Municipality of Fontainebleau.
- 16 October: The Village of **Boucherville** became a Town.
- 26 October: The Parish of Saint-Léon-de-Marston changed its name to Val-Racine.
- 16 November: The Municipality of Saint-Vincent-de-Paul changed its name to Duvernay.
- 30 November: The Village of **Maniwaki** became a Town.
- 28 December: The Municipality of Saint-Faustin changed its name to **Lac-Supérieur**.

=== 1958 ===
- 1 January:
  - Creation of the Town of Pointe-du-Moulin from territories taken from the Parish of Notre-Dame-de-l'Île-Perrot.
  - Creation of the Municipality of Lac-Lemoine.
  - Creation of the Municipality of Saint-Guy.
  - Creation of the Municipality of Saint-Laurent from territories taken from the Municipality of **Palmarolle** and other unorganized territories.
  - Creation of the Municipality of **Wentworth-Nord** from territories taken from the Township of **Wentworth**.
  - Creation of the Village of Lafontaine from territories taken from the Municipality of Saint-Jérôme.
  - Creation of the Village of Saint-André-Est from territories taken from the Municipality of Argenteuil.
  - Creation of the Village of Saint-Vallier from territories taken from the Parish of Saint-Vallier.
- 6 February:
  - The City of Shawinigan Falls changed its name to **Shawinigan**.
  - The Town of **Côte-Saint-Luc** became a City.
  - The Town of Kénogami became a City.
  - The Town of Pointe-aux-Trembles became a City.
  - The Town of **Pointe-Claire** became a City.
  - The Town of Pont-Viau became a City.
  - The Town of Saint-Martin became a City.
  - The Town of Ville-Lasalle became the City of Lasalle.
  - The Municipality of Duvernay became a Town.
  - The Municipality of Saint-François-de-Sales-Isle-Jésus became the Town of Saint-François.
  - The Village of Chandler became a Town.
  - The Village of Saint-Eustache-sur-le-Lac became a Town.
  - The Parish of **Rosemère** became a Town.
  - The Parish of Saint-Hubert became a Town.
- 8 February: The Village of Malbaie became the Town of La Malbaie.
- 14 February:
  - The Town of Mégantic changed its name to **Lac-Mégantic**.
  - The Parish of Laprairie became the Town of **Brossard**.
- 21 February: The Town of **Alma** became a City.
- 1 April: The Parish of Côte-de-Liesse is dissolved and its territory is split between the City of **Dorval**, the City of Lachine and the City of Saint-Laurent.
- 5 April: The Village of **Sainte-Marie** became a Town.
- 12 April: The Parish of Saint-Raymond-Nonnat changed its name to Saint-Raymond.
- 14 June:
  - The Village of **Danville** became a Town.
  - The United Townships of Carpentier-et-de-Courville became the Municipality of **Belcourt**.
- 28 June: The Village of Bois-des-Filions changed its name to Bois-des-Filion.
- 23 August: The Township of Villeneuve became the Municipality of **Val-des-Bois**.
- 6 September: The United Townships of Hartwell-et-Preston became the Parish of Chénéville.
- 13 September: The Parish of **Saint-Bruno-de-Montarville** became a Town.
- 20 September: The Township of Chesham became the Municipality of **Notre-Dame-des-Bois**.
- 18 October: The Township of Marston-Sud became the Municipality of **Piopolis**.
- 22 November: The Township of Aylmer became the Parish of Saint-Sébastien.
- 29 November: The Parish of Notre-Dame-de-Lourdes-de-Ham became the Municipality of Massabielle.
- 18 December: The Parish of Sainte-Geneviève became the Town of Pierrefonds.

=== 1959 ===
- 1 January:
  - Creation of the Town of **Port-Cartier**.
  - Creation of the Municipality of Fatima from territories taken from the Municipality of Étang-du-Nord.
  - Creation of the Municipality of Saint-Janvier-de-la-Croix from territories taken from the Parish of Saint-Janvier-de-Blainville.
  - Creation of the Village of Saint-Bernard from territories taken from the Parish of Saint-Bernard.
  - Creation of the Village of Sainte-Germaine-du-Lac-Etchemin from territories taken from the Parish of Sainte-Germaine-du-Lac-Etchemin.
- 10 January: The Township of Hocquart became the Municipality of **Saint-Cyprien**.
- 31 January: The Parish of Sainte-Marie-de-la-Nouvelle-Beauce changed its name to Sainte-Marie.
- 11 February:
  - Creation of the Town of **Lac-Delage** from territories taken from the Municipality of Lac-Saint-Charles and the Municipality of Stoneham.
  - The Town of **Sainte-Thérèse** became a City.
  - The Town of **Sept-Îles** became a City.
  - The Village of **Gaspé** became a Town.
- 5 March:
  - Creation of the Town of **Estérel** from territories taken from the Parish of Sainte-Marguerite-du-Lac-Masson.
  - The Town of Mackayville became the City of Laflèche.
  - The Town of Montréal-Nord became a City.
  - Creation of the Town of Sainte-Dorothée by the merger of the Village of Sainte-Dorothée and the Parish of Sainte-Dorothée.
  - Creation of the Village of **Lac-Poulin** from territories taken from the Town of **Saint-Georges**, the Village of Saint-Joseph, the Parish of Notre-Dame-de-la-Providence and the Parish of Saint-Benoit-Labre.
  - The Village of Sainte-Geneviève-de-Pierrefonds became the Town of Sainte-Geneviève.
- 18 April: The United Townships of Spaulding and Ditchfield became the Municipality of **Frontenac**.
- 9 May: The Municipality of Saint-Simon-de-Drummond changed its name to Drummondville-Sud.
- 27 June: The Village of La Pointe-à-Gatineau became the Town of Pointe-Gatineau.
- 5 December: The Municipality of Saint-Hubert-de-Spaulding changed its name to **Audet**.
- 12 December:
  - The Municipality of Havre-Aubert changed its name to Bassin.
  - The Parish of Saint-Valère-de-Bulstrode became the Municipality of **Saint-Valère**.
- 18 December: The Village of **Pincourt** became a Town.

=== 1960 ===
- 1 January:
  - Creation of the Municipality of Sainte-Marthe-sur-le-Lac from territories taken from the Municipality of Saint-Eustache.
  - Creation of the Village of Sainte-Anne-de-la-Pocatière from territories taken from the Municipality of Sainte-Anne-de-la-Pocatière.
  - Creation of the Village of Sainte-Clothilde-de-Horton from territories taken from the Parish of Sainte-Clothilde-de-Horton.
- 23 January: The Municipality of Templeton-Nord changed its name to Perkins.
- 30 January: The Town of Baie-d'Urfée changed its name to **Baie-D'Urfé**.
- 4 February:
  - Creation of the Town of Gagnon.
  - Creation of the Town of **Lorraine** from territories taken from the Village of Bois-des-Filion and the Parish of Sainte-Thérèse-de-Blainville.
  - The Municipality of **Dollard-des-Ormeaux** became a Town.
  - The Parish of Saint-Joachim-de-Châteauguay became the Town of Châteauguay-Centre.
- 6 February: The Parish of Saint-Fortunat-de-Wolfestown became the Municipality of **Saint-Fortunat**.
- 10 March: The Municipality of Sainte-Monique-des-Saules became the Town of Ville-Les Saules.
- 12 March:
  - The Village of Belle-Plage changed its name to **Vaudreuil-sur-le-Lac**.
  - The Village of Saint-Emilien became the Town of **Desbiens**.
- 2 April: The Township of Wolfestown became the Parish of Saint-Julien.
- 9 April:
  - The Municipality of Saint-Eugène-de-Grantham changed its name to **Saint-Eugène**.
  - The Municipality of Sud-Ouest-du-Canton-de-Ham changed its name to **Saint-Adrien**.
- 7 June: The Indian reserve of Lac-John is created from parts of the Indian reserve of Matimekosh.
- 18 June: The Village of Sainte-Germaine-du-Lac-Etchemin changed its name to Lac-Etchemin.
- 23 July: The United Townships of DeSalaberry-et-Grandison became the Parish of Saint-Jovite.
- 30 July: The Municipality of Saint-Faustin-Sud changed its name to Saint-Faustin.
- 1 October: The Parish of Orsainville became a Town.

=== 1961 ===
- 1 January:
  - Creation of the Village of Saint-Georges-de-Windsor from territories taken from the Township of Saint-Georges-de-Windsor.
  - Creation of the Village of Saint-Zacharie from territories taken from the Municipality of **Saint-Zacharie**.
- 28 January: The Town of Montréal-Sud is annexed by the City of **Longueuil**.
- 11 February: The Parish of Saint-Martin became the Town of Renaud.
- 18 February:
  - The Municipality of La Rochelle changed its name to Trois-Lacs.
  - The Municipality of Partie-Est-du-Canton-d’Ely changed its name to **Racine**.
  - The Parish of Sainte-Rose-Est became the Town of Auteuil.
- 22 February: The Town of Chicoutimi-Nord became a City.
- 24 March:
  - Creation of the Town of De Grasse from territories taken from the Township of Letellier
  - The Municipality of Pointe-Claire became the Town of **Kirkland**.
- 1 April: Creation of the City of Chomedey by the merger of the City of Saint-Martin, the Town of L'Abord-à-Plouffe and the Town of Renaud.
- 1 May: Creation of the Village of **Pointe-des-Cascades** from territories taken from the Municipality of Vaudreuil and the Parish of Saint-Joseph-de-Soulanges.
- 10 June:
  - The Village of **Baie-Saint-Paul** became a Town.
  - The Parish of Saint-Alphonse-de-Liguori changed its name to Saint-Liguori.
- 30 June: The Municipality of Massabielle changed its name to Notre-Dame-de-Lourdes-de-Ham.
- 12 July: The Village of Shawinigan-Sud became a Town.
- 15 July: The Village of Notre-Dame-de-Portneuf became the Town of **Portneuf**.
- 29 July: The Municipality of Royal-Roussillon-de-Macamic became the Parish of Macamic.
- 18 November: The Municipality of Partie-Est-du-Canton-de-Stukely-Nord changed its name to **Bonsecours**.
- 25 November: The Township of Ely-Nord became the Municipality of **Maricourt**.
- 9 December: The Village of **Amqui** became a Town.
- 30 December:
  - The Municipality of Saint-Michel-des-Forges is annexed by the City of **Trois-Rivières**.
  - The Village of Sainte-Anne-de-la-Pocatière became the Town of **La Pocatière**.
  - The Township of Doncaster became the Municipality of Sainte-Lucie.

=== 1962 ===
- 1 January:
  - The Parish of Saint-Boniface-de-Shawinigan is annexed by the Village of Saint-Boniface-de-Shawinigan.
  - Creation of the Parish of **Saint-Eugène-de-Ladrière** from territories taken from the Parish of **Saint-Fabien**.
- 5 January: The Village of **Sutton** became a Town.
- 3 February: The Parish of Saint-Nicolas became a Town.
- 10 February: The Parish of Saint-Isidore-de-Lauzon changed its name to Saint-Isidore.
- 21 April: The Village of Deux-Rivières changed its name to Saint-Stanislas.
- 26 May:
  - The Municipality of Bellerive changes its name to Bellerive-sur-le-Lac.
  - The Municipality of Saint-Dominique-du-Lac changed its name to **Saint-Juste-du-Lac**.
  - The Municipality of Winslow-Nord changed its name to **Saint-Romain**.
- 27 June: The Town of Duvernay became a City.
- 30 June: The Parish of Saint-David-de-l'Aube-Rivière became the Town of Saint-David-de-l'Auberivière.
- 6 July:
  - The Town of Isle-Maligne, the Town of Naudville and the Town of Riverbend are annexed by the City of **Alma**.
  - The Town of Laval-des-Rapides became a City.
- 21 July: The Township of Ely-Partie-Ouest became the Municipality of **Béthanie**.
- 28 July: The Village of Cabano became a Town.
- 1 September: The Township of Farnham-Ouest became the Municipality of Rainville.
- 8 September: The Municipality of **Beaupré** became a Town.
- 10 November: The Town of Saint-Léonard-de-Port-Maurice changed its name to Saint-Léonard.
- 24 November:
  - The Town of Saint-Elzéar changed its name to Vimont.
  - The Village of **Saint-Césaire** became a Town.
- 22 December: The Village of **Ville-Marie** became a Town.

=== 1963 ===
- 2 February: The Town of Beauport became a City.
- 16 February: The Village of **Thurso** became a Town.
- 30 March: The Village of Saint-Hilaire became the Town of Saint-Hilaire-sur-Richelieu.
- 1 April: Creation of the Town of **Matagami**.
- 20 April: The Municipality of **Saint-Pamphile** became a Town.
- 27 April: The Town of Saint-Eustache-sur-le-Lac became the City of **Deux-Montagnes**.
- 4 May: The Township of Boyer became the Municipality of Saguay.
- 22 May: The Town of Saint-Léonard became a City.
- 1 June: The Municipality of Raudot changed its name to **Sainte-Rita**.
- 22 June: Creation of the Municipality of Côte-Nord-du-Golfe-Saint-Laurent.
- 26 June: The Town of Pierrefonds became a City.
- 10 July: Creation of the Town of Vaudreuil by the merger of the Municipality of Vaudreuil and the Village of Saint-Michel-de-Vaudreuil.
- 13 July: The Town of **Rimouski** became a City.
- 20 July: The Town of Rivière-des-Prairies is annexed by the City of **Montréal**.
- 10 August: The Parish of Trois-Rivières became the Town of Trois-Rivières-Ouest.
- 21 September:
  - The Parish of Saint-Ambroise changed its name to Neufchâtel.
  - The Parish of Saint-Philibert-de-Beauce became the Municipality of **Saint-Philibert**.
- 19 October: The Parish of Saint-Luc became a Town.
- 9 November: The Township of Farnham-Est became the Municipality of Adamsville.
- 23 November: The Parish of Boucherville is annexed by the Town of **Boucherville**.
- 21 December:
  - The Town of La Petite-Rivière changed its name to Duberger.
  - The Municipality of Drummondville-Sud became a Town.
- 28 December:
  - The Village of Rivière-du-Moulin became a Town.
  - The Parish of Saint-Romuald-d'Etchemin became a Town.

=== 1964 ===
- 1 January:
  - Creation of the Municipality of **Champneuf**.
  - Creation of the Municipality of **Namur** from territories taken from the United Townships of Suffolk-et-Addington.
  - Creation of the Municipality of Saint-Godard-de-Lejeune.
  - Creation of the Village of Nazareth from territories taken from the Parish of Notre-Dame-du-Sacré-Cœur.
  - Creation of the Village of **Pointe-aux-Outardes** and the Village of **Pointe-Lebel**.
  - Creation of the Village of Sainte-Agathe-Sud from territories taken from the Parish of Sainte-Agathe.
- 1 February: The Village of Sweetsburgh is annexed by the Town of **Cowansville**.
- 21 March: The Parish of Saint-Charles-de-Caplan became the Municipality of **Caplan**.
- 28 March:
  - The Municipality of Bout-de-l’Isle is annexed by the Town of **Sainte-Anne-de-Bellevue**.
  - The Parish of Notre-Dame-de-Liesse is annexed by the City of Saint-Laurent.
- 25 April: The Village of Saraguay is annexed by the City of **Montréal**.
- 9 May: The Parish of Sainte-Victoire changed its name to Sainte-Victoire-de-Sorel.
- 18 June:
  - Creation of the Town of **Bromont** from territories taken from the Village of Shefford-Ouest, the Township of Brome and the Township of **Shefford**.
  - The Town of Laval-Ouest became a City.
- 27 June: The Parish of Sainte-Philomène became a Town.
- 11 July: The Parish of Neufchâtel became a Town.
- 18 July: The Town of Sainte-Rose became a City.
- 8 August: The Township of Auckland became the Municipality of **Saint-Malo**.
- 29 August: The Village of **Princeville** became a Town.
- 14 November: The Municipality of Hull changed its name to Lucerne.
- 5 December: The Municipality of Havre-Aubert-Est changed its name to Havre-Aubert.

=== 1965 ===
- 1 January:
  - Creation of the Municipality of **Saint-Elzéar** from territories taken from the Municipality of Bonaventure, the Municipality of **New Carlisle**, the Municipality of Paspébiac-Ouest and other unorganized territories.
  - Creation of the Municipality of **Saint-Jean-de-la-Lande**.
  - Creation of the Village of Île-d’Entrée from territories taken from the Municipality of Havre-Aubert.
  - The Village of Sainte-Adèle is annexed by the Parish of Sainte-Adèle.
  - Creation of the Parish of **Saint-Alexandre-des-Lacs** from territories taken from the Parish of Saint-Benoît-Joseph-Labre, the Parish of Saint-Tharcisius and other unorganized territories.
  - Creation of the Parish of Saint-Nil and the Parish of Saint-René-de-Matane from territories taken from the dissolution of an unorganized territory formed from territories taken from the Parish of Sainte-Félicité, the former Township of Romieux and the former United Township of Dalibaire-et-Romieu.
  - Creation of the Parish of Trinité-des-Monts.
- 20 February: The Town of Château d’Eau is annexed by the Town of Loretteville.
- 13 March: The Parish of Chénéville became the Municipality of **Lac-Simon**.
- 10 April: The Parish of Sainte-Adèle became a Municipality.
- 22 May: The Parish of Saint-Gérard-Magella became the Town of Bélair.
- 19 June: The Township of Ely changed its name to **Valcourt**.
- 17 July: The Parish of Notre-Dame-des-Laurentides became a Town.
- 6 August:
  - Creation of the Town of **Laval** by the merger of the City of Chomedey, the City of Duvernay, the City of Laval-des-Rapides, the City of Laval-Ouest, the City of Pont-Viau, the City of Sainte-Rose, the Town of Auteuil, the Town of Fabreville, the Town of Laval-sur-le-Lac, the Town of Saint-François, the Town of Saint-Vincent-de-Paul, the Town of Sainte-Dorothée, the Town of Ville-des-Iles-Laval and the Town of Vimont.
  - Creation of the Town of **Lebel-sur-Quévillon**.
- 14 August: The Municipality of Saint-Étienne-de-la-Malbaie is annexed by the Town of La Malbaie.
- 18 September: Creation of the City of **Chambly** by the merger of the Town of Chambly and the Town of Fort-Chambly.
- 17 October: Creation of the Town of **Bécancour** by the merger of the Village of Bécancourt, the Village of Gentilly, the Village of La Rochelle, the Village of Laval, the Village of Villers, the Parish of Bécancour, the Parish of Saint-Edouard-de-Gentilly, the Parish of Saint-Grégoire-le-Grand, the Parish of Sainte-Angèle-de-Laval, the Parish of Sainte-Gertrude and the Parish of Très-Précieux-Sang-de-Notre-Seigneur.
- 23 October: The Town of Loretteville became a City.
- 30 October: The Village of Saint-Joseph became the Town of **Saint-Joseph-de-Beauce**.
- 13 November:
  - The Village of **Waterville** became a Town.
  - The Parish of Saint-Jean-Chrysostome became a Town.
- 4 December: The Village of Charny became a Town.
- 18 December: Creation of the City of Saint-Romuald-d’Etchemin by the merger of the Town of Saint-Romuald-d’Etchemin and the Parish of Saint-Telesphore.
- 24 December: The Village of **Causapscal** became a Town.
- 31 December: The Parish of Saint-Joseph-de-Chambly became the Town of **Carignan**.

=== 1966 ===
- 1 January:
  - Creation of the Municipality of **Baie-Johan-Beetz**, The Municipality of Longue-Pointe and the Municipality of **Rivière-Saint-Jean**.
  - Creation of the Municipality of **Notre-Dame-de-Lorette** from territories taken from the Municipality of Saint-Michel-de-Mistassini and other unorganized territories.
  - Creation of the Parish of **Saint-Charles-Garnier**.
- 29 January: The Municipality of Hull changed its name to Touraine.
- 12 March: Creation of the Town of **Mont-Saint-Hilaire** by the merger of the Town of Saint-Hilaire-sur-Richelieu and the Municipality of Mont-Saint-Hilaire.
- 19 March: The Town of **Beaconsfield** became a City.
- 2 April: Creation of the City of **Montmagny** by the merger of the Town of Montmagny and the Parish of Saint-Thomas.
- 23 April: The Municipality of Saint-David-d’Escourt changed its name to Sully.
- 30 April: Creation of the City of **Lachute** by the merger of the Town of Lachute and the Village of Ayersville.
- 7 May: The Parish of Saint-Jacques-des-Piles changed its name to Grandes-Piles.
- 21 May: The Town of Québec-Ouest changed its name to Ville-Vanier.
- 11 June: The Town of Ville-Vanier changed its name to Vanier.
- 9 July: The Village of Isletville became the Town of L’Islet.
- 20 August: The Village of Shefford-Ouest is annexed by the Town of **Bromont**.
- 24 September: The Village of Masson became a Town.
- 12 November:
  - The Municipality of Joliette-Sud is annexed by the City of **Joliette**.
  - The Village of Drummondville-Ouest is annexed by the City of **Drummondville**.
- 19 November:
  - The Village of Lac-Etchemin became a Town.
  - The Village of **Saint-Pascal** became a Town.
- 10 December: The Municipality of Saint-Jérôme became the Parish of Bellefeuille.
- 17 December: The Township of Portland changed its name to Notre-Dame-de-la-Salette.
- 24 December: The Municipality of Sydenham-Sud changed its name to Saint-Majorique.

=== 1967 ===
- 1 January: Creation of the Municipality of **Lamarche** from territories taken from the Municipality of **Labrecque** and other unorganized territories.
- 7 January: The Municipality of Beauport-Ouest is annexed by the City of Beauport.
- 21 January: The Municipality of Les Écureuils is annexed by the Town of **Donnacona**.
- 1 February: The Village of Grande-Rivière is annexed by the Municipality of Grande-Rivière.
- 22 April: The Parish of Saint-Armand-Est changed its name to Frelighsburg.
- 27 May: The Parish of Saint-Zotique is annexed by the Village of Saint-Zotique.
- 17 June: The Municipality of Saint-Agricole changed its name to **Val-des-Lacs**.
- 30 June:
  - The Village of **Clermont** became a Town.
  - The Village of Épiphanie became the Town of **L’Épiphanie**.
  - The Village of Saint-Antoine-des-Laurentides became the Town of Saint-Antoine.
- 22 July: The Parish of Sainte-Cécile is annexed by the City of **Salaberry-de-Valleyfield**.
- 29 July: The Village of Notre-Dame-de-Lorette became the Town of Ancienne-Lorette.
- 16 September: The Village of Nazareth and the Parish of Notre-Dame-du-Sacré-Cœur are annexed by the City of **Rimouski**.
- 14 October:
  - The Municipality of Douville became a Town.
  - The Village of Saint-Gabriel-de-Brandon became the Town of **Saint-Gabriel**.
  - The Parish of Saint-Joseph-de-Mont-Rolland became the Municipality of Mont-Rolland.
  - The Township of Wexford became the Municipality of **Entrelacs**.
- 21 October: The Village of Soulanges became the Town of Les Cèdres.
- 16 December:
  - The Parish of Saint-Germain-de-Rimouski is annexed by the City of **Rimouski**.
  - The Parish of Sainte-Julienne-de-Rawdon changed its name to Sainte-Julienne.
- 23 December: The Parish of Sainte-Rose-du-Dégelé changed its name to Sainte-Rose-du-Dégelis.

=== 1968 ===
- 1 January:
  - Creation of the Municipality of **L’Ascension-de-Patapédia**.
  - Creation of the Municipality of **Sainte-Paule**.
- 3 February: The Town of Sainte-Philomène changed its name to **Mercier**.
- 7 February: The Village of Saint-Joseph became a Town.
- 16 March: The Village of **Richelieu** became a Town.
- 20 April: The Municipality of Sainte-Anne-des-Monts became a Town.
- 4 May: The Parish of **Château-Richer** became a Town.
- 15 June: The Village of Saint-Michel changed its name to Yamaska.
- 22 June: The Parish of Saint-Nicolas-Sud became the Municipality of Bernières.
- 29 June:
  - Creation of the Municipality of **Saint-Prime** by the merger of the Village of Saint-Prime and the Parish of Saint-Prime.
  - The Parish of Sainte-Thérèse-de-Blainville became the Town of **Blainville**.
- 27 July: The Municipality of Duchesnay changed its name to **Rivière-à-Claude**.
- 31 August: The Township of Gayhurst became the Municipality of Lac-Drolet.
- 7 September: The Town of Châteauguay Heights is annexed by the Town of **Châteauguay**.
- 12 October: The Town of Bourlamaque and the Municipality of Lac-Lemoine are annexed by the Town of **Val-d'Or**.
- 19 October: Creation of the Town of **Cap-Chat** by the merger of the Village of Cap-Chat and the Parish of Saint-Norbert-du-Cap-Chat.
- 24 October: The City of Saint-Michel is annexed by the City of **Montréal**.
- 2 November: The Village of Bonsecours changed its name to L’Islet-sur-Mer.
- 14 December: Creation of the Town of Notre-Dame-du-Lac by the merger of the Village of Notre-Dame-du-Lac and the Parish of Notre-Dame-du-Lac.

=== 1969 ===
- 15 March:
  - The Town of Ville-Les Saules changed its name to Les Saules.
  - The Town of Ville-Saint-Pierre changed its name to Saint-Pierre.
  - The Municipality of Anse-aux-Griffons changed its name to L’Anse-aux-Griffons.
  - The Municipality of Anticosti changed its name to Île-d'Anticosti.
  - The Municipality of Argenteuil became the Parish of Saint-André-d’Argenteuil.
  - The Municipality of Baie-de-Gaspé-Nord became a Township.
  - The Municipality of Berthier-en-Haut became the Parish of Sainte-Geneviève-de-Berthier.
  - The Municipality of Bishopton became a Village.
  - The Municipality of Chicoutimi became a Township.
  - The Municipality of Chutes-de-Kingsey changed its name to Kingsey Falls.
  - The Municipality of Clifton became the Township of Clifton-Partie-Est.
  - The Municipality of Contrecoeur became a Parish.
  - The Municipality of Deschambault became the Parish of Saint-Joseph-de-Deschambault.
  - The Municipality of Dudswell became a Township.
  - The Municipality of **Dundee** became a Township.
  - The Municipality of Eaton became a Township.
  - The Municipality of Étang-du-Nord changed its name to L’Étang-du-Nord.
  - The Municipality of Fiedmont-et-Barraute changed its name to Fiedmont.
  - The Municipality of Fugerville changed its name to **Fugèreville**.
  - The Municipality of Gayhurst became the Township of Gayhurst-Partie-Sud-Est.
  - The Municipality of **Godmanchester** became a Township.
  - The Municipality of Grondines became the Parish of Saint-Charles-des-Grondines.
  - The Municipality of Hatley became the Township of Hatley-Partie-Ouest.
  - The Municipality of Hull became the Township of Hull-Partie-Ouest.
  - The Municipality of Inverness became a Township.
  - The Municipality of Islet became the Parish of Notre-Dame-de-Bon-Secours-de-l’Islet
  - The Municipality of Kakonna became the Parish of Saint-Georges-de-Cacouna.
  - The Municipality of L’Annonciation became the Parish of L’Annonciation-Partie-Nord.
  - The Municipality of La Manaza changed its name to **La Macaza**.
  - The Municipality of Lac-Drolet became the Township of Gayhurst.
  - The Municipality of Lambton became a Township.
  - The Municipality of Lotbinière became the Parish of Saint-Louis-de-Lotbinière.
  - The Municipality of Maskinongé became the Parish of Saint-Joseph-de-Maskinongé.
  - The Municipality of Matane became the Parish of Saint-Jérôme-de-Matane.
  - The Municipality of Newton became the Parish of Sainte-Justine-de-Newton.
  - The Municipality of Nouvelle-Longueuil became the Parish of Saint-Polycarpe.
  - The Municipality of Onslow became the Township of Onslow-Partie-Sud.
  - The Municipality of Partie-Est-du-Township-de-Port-Daniel became the Township of Port-Daniel-Partie-Est.
  - The Municipality of Partie-Ouest-du-Township-de-Port-Daniel became the Township of Port-Daniel-Partie-Ouest.
  - The Municipality of Partie-Sud-Est-du-Canton-de-Restigouche became the Township of Ristigouche-Partie-Sud-Est.
  - The Municipality of Pointe-aux-Trembles became a Parish.
  - The Municipality of Pointe-du-Lac changed its name to La-Visitation-de-la-Pointe-du-Lac.
  - The Municipality of Port-Joli changed its name to **Saint-Jean-Port-Joli**.
  - The Municipality of Rigaud became the Parish of Sainte-Madeleine-de-Rigaud.
  - The Municipality of Rivière-du-Loup became the Parish of Saint-Patrice-de-la-Rivière-du-Loup.
  - The Municipality of Rivière-du-Loup-en-Haut became the Parish of Saint-Antoine-de-la-Rivière-du-Loup.
  - The Municipality of Saint-Aimé-du-Lac-des-Îles became a Parish.
  - The Municipality of Saint-Anicet became a Parish.
  - The Municipality of Saint-Benoît became a Parish.
  - The Municipality of Saint-Colomban became a Parish.
  - The Municipality of Saint-Édouard became a Parish.
  - The Municipality of Saint-Eustache became a Parish.
  - The Municipality of Saint-Félix-de-Valois became a Parish.
  - The Municipality of Saint-Féréol became a Parish.
  - The Municipality of Saint-Hermas became a Parish.
  - The Municipality of Saint-Janvier-de-la-Croix changed its name to Saint-Janvier-de-Lacroix.
  - The Municipality of **Saint-Pierre-de-la-Rivière-du-Sud** became a Parish.
  - The Municipality of Saint-Simon-de-la-Baie-Ha! Ha! became the Parish of Saint-Simon.
  - The Municipality of Sainte-Anastasie-de-Nelson became a Parish.
  - The Municipality of Sainte-Anne-de-la-Pocatière became a Parish.
  - The Municipality of Sainte-Clothilde-de-Beauce became the Parish of Sainte-Clothilde.
  - The Municipality of Sainte-Elizabeth became a Parish.
  - The Municipality of Sainte-Mélanie became a Parish.
  - The Municipality of Sainte-Scholastique became a Parish.
  - The Municipality of Sept-Cantons-Unis-de-Saguenay became the United Townships of Les Sept-Cantons-Unis-du-Saguenay.
  - The Municipality of South-Stukely changed its name to Stukely-Sud.
  - The Municipality of Stoneham became the United Townships of **Stoneham-et-Tewkesbury**.
  - The Municipality of Sud-du-Canton-de-Thetford became the Township of Thetford-Partie-Sud.
  - The Municipality of Templeton-Est changed its name to Templeton-Est-Partie-Est.
  - The Municipality of Terrebonne became the Parish of Saint-Louis-de-Terrebonne.
  - The Municipality of Trois-Pistoles became the Parish of Notre-Dame-des-Neiges-des-Trois-Pistoles.
  - The Municipality of Varennes became the Parish of Sainte-Anne-de-Varennes.
  - The Municipality of Verchères became the Parish of Saint-François-Xavier-de-Verchères.
  - The Municipality of Wakefield became the Township of Wakefield-Partie-Est.
  - The Municipality of Yamachiche became the Parish of Sainte-Anne-d’Yamachiche.
  - The Village of Annonciation changed its name to L’Annonciation.
  - The Village of Avenir changed its name to L'Avenir.
  - The Village of Baie-de-Shawenegan changed its name to Baie-de-Shawinigan.
  - The Village of Farnham changed its name to East Farnham.
  - The Village of Guadeloupe changed its name to **La Guadeloupe**.
  - The Village of L'Ange-Gardien changed its name to Ange-Gardien.
  - The Village of L'Islet-sur-Mer changed its name to Bonsecours.
  - The Village of Pérade changed its name to La Pérade.
  - The Village of Saint-Georges-de-Kakouna changed its name to Saint-Georges-de-Cacouna.
  - The Village of Saint-Ubalde changed its name to Saint-Ubald.
  - The Village of Station-du-Coteau changed its name to La Station-du-Coteau.
  - The Village of Wickham-Ouest changed its name to Wickham.
  - The Parish of Ancienne-Lorette changed its name to L'Ancienne-Lorette.
  - The Parish of Ange-Gardien changed its name to L'Ange-Gardien.
  - The Parish of Ange-Gardien changed its name to L'Ange-Gardien.
  - The Parish of Ascension-de-Notre-Seigneur changed its name to **L’Ascension-de-Notre-Seigneur**.
  - The Parish of Batiscan changed its name to Saint-François-Xavier-de-Batiscan.
  - The Parish of Beaumont changed its name to Saint-Étienne-de-Beaumont.
  - The Parish of Berthier-en-Bas changed its name to Berthier.
  - The Parish of Bienheureux-Alphonse-Rodriguez changed its name to Saint-Alphonse-de-Rodriguez.
  - The Parish of Champlain changed its name to La Visitation-de-Champlain.
  - The Parish of Des Saints-Anges changed its name to Saints-Anges.
  - The Parish of Disreali changed its name to **Disraeli**.
  - The Parish of Kamouraska changed its name to Saint-Louis-de-Kamouraska.
  - The Parish of L’Isle-du-Pads changed its name to La Visitation-de-la-Sainte-Vierge-de-l’Isle-du-Pads.
  - The Parish of Notre-Dame-de-Bonsecours changed its name to Notre-Dame-de-Bon-Secours.
  - The Parish of Notre-Dame-de-Mont-Carmel changed its name to Notre-Dame-du-Mont-Carmel.
  - The Parish of Notre-Dame-du-Mont-Carmel became the Municipality of **Mont-Carmel**.
  - The Parish of Petite-Rivière changed its name to Saint-François-Xavier-de-la-Petite-Rivière.
  - The Parish of Pointe-Lévi changed its name to Saint-Joseph-de-la-Pointe-de-Lévy.
  - The Parish of Sacré-Cœur-de-Marie changed its name to Sacré-Cœur-de-Marie-Partie-Sud.
  - The Parish of Saint-Alban-d'Alton changed its name to Saint-Alban.
  - The Parish of Saint-Antoine-Abbé changed its name to Saint-Antoine-Abbé-Partie-Nord-Est.
  - The Parish of Saint-Antoine-de-la-Valtrie changed its name to Saint-Antoine-de-Lavaltrie.
  - The Parish of Saint-Antoine-de-Padoue changed its name to Saint-Antoine-de-Padoue-de-Kempt.
  - The Parish of Saint-Augustin changed its name to Saint-Augustin-de-Desmaures.
  - The Parish of Saint-Bernard changed its name to Saint-Bernard-Partie-Sud.
  - The Parish of Saint-Charles-Boromée changed its name to Saint-Charles-Boromé.
  - The Parish of Saint-Charles-Borrommée-du-Village-d’Industrie changed its name to Saint-Charles-Borromée.
  - The Parish of Saint-Denis-de-Kamouraska changed its name to Saint-Denis.
  - The Parish of Saint-Dominique-de-Jonquières changed its name to Saint-Dominique-de-Jonquière.
  - The Parish of Saint-Éleuthère became a Municipality.
  - The Parish of Saint-Elzéar-de-Linière became the Municipality of Saint-Elzéar-de-Beauce.
  - The Parish of Saint-Étienne became the Municipality of **Saint-Étienne-de-Beauharnois**.
  - The Parish of Saint-Étienne changed its name to **Saint-Étienne-des-Grès**.
  - The Parish of Saint-Eugène-de-l'Islet changed its name to Saint-Eugène.
  - The Parish of Saint-Frédéric-de-Beauce changed its name to **Saint-Frédéric**.
  - The Parish of Saint-Georges became the Municipality of Aubert-Gallion.
  - The Parish of Saint-Georges-de-Clarenceville became a Municipality.
  - The Parish of Saint-Gérard-Magella changed its name to Saint-Gérard-Majella.
  - The Parish of Saint-Germain changed its name to Saint-Germain-de-Grantham.
  - The Parish of Saint-Gervais-et-Saint-Protais changed its name to Saints-Gervais-et-Protais.
  - The Parish of Saint-Hémédine changed its name to **Sainte-Hénédine**.
  - The Parish of Saint-Henri changed its name to Saint-Henri-de-Lauzon.
  - The Parish of Saint-Hyacinthe changed its name to Notre-Dame-de-Saint-Hyacinthe.
  - The Parish of Saint-Isidore-de-Lauzon changed its name to Saint-Isidore.
  - The Parish of Saint-Jean-Baptiste-de-Rouville changed its name to Saint-Jean-Baptiste.
  - The Parish of Saint-Joseph changed its name to Saint-Joseph-du-Lac.
  - The Parish of Saint-Lin-de-Lachenaye changed its name to Saint-Lin.
  - The Parish of Saint-Louis changed its name to Saint-Louis-de-France.
  - The Parish of **Saint-Mathieu** became a Municipality.
  - The Parish of Saint-Mathieu-de-Dixville became a Municipality.
  - The Parish of Saint-Michel-Archange became a Municipality.
  - The Parish of Saint-Nazaire changed its name to **Saint-Nazaire-de-Dorchester**.
  - The Parish of Saint-Patrice changed its name to Saint-Patrice-de-Sherrington.
  - The Parish of Saint-Paul changed its name to Saint-Paul d’Abbotsford.
  - The Parish of Saint-Raphaël changed its name to Saint-Raphaël-Partie-Sud.
  - The Parish of Saint-Raphaël-de-l’Isle-Bizard changed its name to Saint-Raphaël-de-l’Île-Bizard.
  - The Parish of Saint-Roch changed its name to Saint-Roch-de-l’Achigan.
  - The Parish of Saint-Stanislas-de-la-Rivière-des-Envies changed its name to Saint-Stanislas.
  - The Parish of Saint-Stanislas-Kostka changed its name to Saint-Stanislas-de-Kostka.
  - The Parish of Saint-Sylvestre-de-Beaurivage changed its name to Saint-Sylvestre.
  - The Parish of Saint-Tharcisius changed its name to Saint-Tharsicius.
  - The Parish of Saint-Théophile-de-la-Beauce changed its name to Saint-Théophile-de-Beauce.
  - The Parish of Saint-Thimothée changed its name to Saint-Timothée.
  - The Parish of Saint-Thomas-de-Foucault changed its name to Saint-Thomas.
  - The Parish of Saint-Ubalde changed its name to Saint-Ubald.
  - The Parish of Saint-Ulric changed its name to Saint-Ulric-de-Matane.
  - The Parish of Sainte-Angèle changed its name to Sainte-Angèle-de-Monnoir.
  - The Parish of Sainte-Anne changed its name to Sainte-Anne-de-Sorel.
  - The Parish of Sainte-Cécile changed its name to **Sainte-Cécile-de-Lévrard**.
  - The Parish of Sainte-Émélie-de-l’Énergie changed its name to Sainte-Émilie-de-l’Énergie.
  - The Parish of Sainte-Emmélie-de-Lotbinière changed its name to Sainte-Emmélie.
  - The Parish of Sainte-Geneviève changed its name to **Sainte-Geneviève-de-Batiscan**.
  - The Parish of Sainte-Hedwige changed its name to Sainte-Hedwidge.
  - The Parish of Sainte-Marie-Salomée changed its name to Sainte-Marie-Salomé.
  - The Parish of Sainte-Marthe-du-Cap-de-la-Magdeleine became the Municipality of Sainte-Marthe-du-Cap-de-la-Madeleine.
  - The Township of Caxton became the Parish of Saint-Élie.
  - The Township of **Ham-Nord** became a Municipality.
  - The Township of Hinchinbrooke changed its name to Hinchinbrook.
  - The Township of Île-Allumettes changed its name to Isle-des-Allumettes.
  - The Township of Ireland-Nord changed its name to Ireland-Partie-Nord.
  - The Township of Ireland-Sud became the Municipality of Ireland.
  - The Township of Leslie became the United Townships of Leslie-Clapham-et-Huddersfield.
  - The Township of Lochaber changed its name to Lochaber-Partie-Nord.
  - The Township of Lochaber changed its name to **Lochaber-Partie-Ouest**.
  - The Township of Mansfield became the United Townships of Mansfield-et-Pontefract.
  - The Township of Masham changed its name to Masham-Nord.
  - The Township of Matapédia became the Parish of Saint-Alexis-de-Matapédia.
  - The Township of Partie-Est-du-Township-de-Leeds changed its name to Leeds-Partie-Est.
  - The Township of Sheen became the United Townships of Sheen-Esther-Aberdeen-et-Malakoff.
  - The Township of Stanfold became the Parish of Saint-Eusèbe-de-Stanfold.
  - The Township of Waltham became the United Townships of Waltham-et-Bryson.
  - The United Townships of Risborough-et-Marlow changed its name to Risborough-et-Partie-de-Marlow.
- 29 March: The Village of **Disraeli** became a Town.
- 26 April: The Municipality of **Otterburn Park** became a Town.
- 3 May: The Town of Préville is annexed by the City of **Saint-Lambert**.
- 7 June:
  - Creation of the Town of **Hudson** by the merger of the Village of Como-Est, the Village of Hudson and the Village of Hudson Heights.
  - The Parish of Notre-Dame-des-Anges-de-Montauban is annexed by the Village of Notre-Dame-des-Anges.
  - The Parish of **Saint-Basile-le-Grand** became a Town.
- 5 July: The Village of La Providence became a Town.
- 19 July:
  - Creation of the Municipality of **Saint-Dominique** by the merger of the Village of Saint-Dominique and the Parish of Saint-Dominique.
  - The Parish of Saint-Mathias-de-Cabano is annexed by the Town of Cabano.
- 16 August:
  - The City of Jacques-Cartier is annexed by the City of **Longueuil**.
  - The Parish of Saint-Eusèbe-de-Stanfold changed its name to Princeville.
- 11 October: The Village of **Charlemagne** became a Town.
- 22 November: The Parish of Saint-Féréol became the Municipality of Saint-Féréol-des-Neiges.
- 29 November: Creation of the Village of **Saint-André-du-Lac-Saint-Jean** by the merger of the Municipality of Saint-André and the Village of Saint-André.
- 13 December:
  - The Parish of Sainte-Rose-du-Dégelis became the Town of **Dégelis**.
  - The Township of **New Richmond** became a Town.

=== 1970 ===
- 1 January:
  - The Town of Les Saules is annexed by **Quebec City**.
  - Creation of the Communauté urbaine de Québec
- 24 January: The Parish of Sainte-Jeanne-d’Arc is annexed by the Village of **Sainte-Jeanne-d’Arc**.
- 14 March: The Township of Mann became the Municipality of **Pointe-à-la-Croix**.
- 28 March: The Parish of Sainte-Flore is annexed by the City of Grand-Mère.
- 25 April: The Parish of Saint-Jean-l’Évangéliste is annexed by the City of Saint-Jean.
- 25 July: The Municipality of Saint-Thérèse-Ouest became a Town.
- 1 August: The Town of Duberger is annexed by **Quebec City**.
- 15 August: The Village of Saint-Jean-Eudes is annexed by the City of Arvida.
- 26 December: The Parish of L’Ancienne-Lorette is annexed by the City of Sainte-Foy.

=== 1971 ===
- 1 January:
  - Creation of the City of **Percé** by the merger of the Municipality of Barachois, the Municipality of Bridgeville, the Municipality of Cap-d’Espoir, the Municipality of Percé and the Parish of Saint-Pierre-de-la-Malbaie-Numéro-Deux.
  - Creation of the City of Sainte-Scholastique by the merger of the Municipality of Saint-Janvier-de-Lacroix, the Village of Saint-Augustin, the Village of Saint-Benoît, the Village of Sainte-Scholastique, the Parish of Saint-Antoine-des-Laurentides, the Parish of Saint-Augustin, the Parish of Saint-Canut, the Parish of Saint-Hermas, the Parish of Saint-Janvier-de-Blainville, the Parish of Sainte-Monique, the Parish of Sainte-Scholastique and territories taken from the Town of Sainte-Thérèse-Ouest.
  - The Town of Neufchâtel is annexed by **Quebec City**.
  - The Municipality of Baie-de-Gaspé-Sud, the Municipality of Grande-Grève, the Municipality of Haldimand, the Municipality of L’Anse-aux-Griffons, the Municipality of Rivière-au-Renard, the Municipality of Saint-Alban-du-Cap-des-Rosiers, the Municipality of Saint-Majorique, the Municipality of York, the Parish of Saint-Maurice, the Township of Baie-de-Gaspé-Nord and the Township of Douglas are annexed by the Town of **Gaspé**.
  - The Village of Val-Jalbert is annexed by the Parish of Saint-Louis-de-Chambord.
  - The Parish of Saint-Jérusalem-d’Argenteuil is dissolved and its territory is split between the City of **Lachute** and the newly formed City of Sainte-Scholastique.
- 2 January: Creation of the City of **Lac-Brome** by the merger of the Village of Foster, the Village of Knowlton and the Township of Brome.
- 9 January: The Parish of Saint-Henri-de-Mascouche became the City of **Mascouche**.
- 13 February: The Municipality of Saint-Jean-de-Dieu became a Parish.
- 6 March: The Municipality of Christie changed its name to **La Martre**.
- 29 May: The Municipality of Brunet is annexed by the Town of **Mont-Laurier**.
- 14 July: Creation of the Municipality of Baie-James.
- 28 August:
  - The Municipality of Ascot-Nord changed its name to Fleurimont.
  - The Parish of Berthier changed its name to Berthier-sur-Mer.
- 18 September: Creation of the Municipality of **Verchères** by the merger of the Village of Verchères and the Parish of Saint-François-Xavier-de-Verchères.
- 25 September:
  - Creation of the City of **Dunham** by the merger of the Village of Dunham and the Township of Dunham.
  - Creation of the Municipality of **Lac-Bouchette** by the merger of the Village of Lac-Bouchette and the Municipality of Saint-Thomas-d’Aquin.
  - The Municipality of Saint-Ambroise is annexed by the Village of Saint-Ambroise.
- 23 October: The Municipality of Touraine became a City.
- 30 October:
  - The City of Laflèche is annexed by the Town of Saint-Hubert.
  - Creation of the Municipality of Lac-Nominingue by the merger of the Municipality of Bellerive-sur-le-Lac, the Village of Nominingue and the Township of Loranger.
  - The Parish of Sainte-Julie became the City of Saint-Julie.

=== 1972 ===
- 1 January: Creation of the Municipality of Île-du-Havre-Aubert by the merger of the Municipality of Bassin and the Municipality of Havre-Aubert.
- 15 January: The Parish of Saint-Eustache is annexed by the Town of **Saint-Eustache**.
- 29 January: The Parish of Sainte-Cécile-du-Bic is annexed by the Village of Bic.
- 13 May:
  - Creation of the Municipality of **Esprit-Saint**.
  - Creation of the Municipality of Sullivan.
- 24 August:
  - The City of Saint-Julie changed its name to **Sainte-Julie**.
  - The Municipality of Saint-Féréol-des-Neiges changed its name to Saint-Féréol-les-Neiges.
  - The Village of Bonsecours changed its name to L'Islet-sur-Mer.
  - The Township of Gayhurst became the Municipality of **Lac-Drolet**.
- 26 August:
  - Creation of the City of Carleton by the merger of the Municipality of Carleton-sur-Mer and the Township of Carleton.
  - Creation of the City of **Varennes** by the merger of the Village of Varennes and the Parish of Sainte-Anne-de-Varennes.
- 2 September:
  - Creation of the Municipality of Boucher.
  - Creation of the Municipality of Gallix.
  - Creation of the Municipality of Haute-Mauricie.
- 30 September: Creation of the Municipality of Rivière-Pentecôte.
- 25 November: The Parish of Saint-Benoît-Abbé changed its name to **Packington**.
- 16 December: The Village of Notre-Dame-d’Hébertville is annexed by the Municipality of **Hébertville**.
- 23 December:
  - The Village of Wickham is annexed by the Municipality of **Wickham**.
  - The Parish of Saint-Charles-de-Lachenaie became the City of Lachenaie.

=== 1973 ===
- 1 January: Creation of the Municipality of Saint-Honoré by the merger of the Village of Saint-Honoré and the Parish of Saint-Honoré.
- 20 January: Creation of the Municipality of Shawbridge by the merger of the Municipality of Lesage, Village of Prévost and the Village of Shawbridge.
- 27 January:
  - Creation of the City of **Sainte-Anne-de-Beaupré** by the merger of the Village of Sainte-Anne-de-Beaupré and the Parish of Sainte-Anne-de-Beaupré.
  - The City of Sainte-Scholastique changed its name to **Mirabel**.
  - Creation of the Municipality of **Labelle** by the merger of the Village of Labelle and the Township of Joly.
- 3 March:
  - Creation of the Municipality of **Franklin** by the merger of the Parish of Saint-Antoine-Abbé-Partie-Nord-Est and the Township of Franklin.
  - Creation of the Municipality of **Saint-Ubalde** by the merger of the Village of Saint-Ubald and the Parish of Saint-Ubald.
- 14 March: The Town of Beauceville-Est is annexed by the Town of **Beauceville**.
- 31 March: The Township of Sicotte changed its name to Grand-Remous.
- 1 May: The Municipality of Charlesbourg-Ouest is annexed by **Quebec City**.
- 5 May: The Municipality of **Sainte-Adèle** became a City.
- 12 May:
  - Creation of the Municipality of **Saint-Fulgence** by the merger of the Village of Saint-Fulgence and the Parish of Saint-Fulgence.
  - The Parish of **Saint-Constant** became a City.
- 30 June: Creation of the Municipality of **Sacré-Coeur** by the merger of the Municipality of Sacré-Coeur-de-Jésus-Village and the Parish of Sacré-Coeur-de-Jésus.
- 21 July: The Municipality of Winslow-Sud changed its name to **Stornoway**.
- 4 August: The Parish of Sainte-Catherine-d’Alexandrie-de-Laprairie became the City of **Sainte-Catherine**.
- 15 September: The Municipality of **Sainte-Marthe-sur-le-Lac** became a City.
- 3 November: Creation of the City of **Pohénégamook** by the merger of the Municipality of Saint-Éleuthère, the Municipality of Sully and the Parish of Saint-Pierre-d’Estcourt.
- 13 November: Creation of the Municipality of Belleau.
- 17 November: The Parish of Saint-Laurent-de-Matapédia changed its name to Matapédia.
- 24 November: Creation of the Municipality of Rivière-Pigou.
- 1 December: The Parish of Saint-Paul-l’Ermite became a City.
- 8 December: Creation of the Municipality of **Chambord** by the merger of the Village of Chambord and the Parish of Saint-Louis-de-Chambord.
- 29 December: Creation of the City of Val-Bélair by the merger of the Town of Bélair and the Town of Val-Saint-Michel.

=== 1974 ===
- 9 February: The Municipality of Amos-Ouest is annexed by the Town of **Amos**.
- 5 March:
  - The Town of Sainte-Thérèse-Ouest changed its name to **Boisbriand**.
  - The Parish of Saint-Tharsicius changed its name to **Saint-Tharcisius**.
- 6 April: Creation of the Municipality of **Saint-Apollinaire** by the merger of the Village of Francoeur and the Parish of Saint-Apollinaire.
- 13 April: The Village of **Valcourt** became a City.
- 22 June: The Parish of Saint-Nil became a Municipality.
- 20 July: Creation of the Municipality of **Rivière-Éternité**.
- 31 August: Creation of the Municipality of **Saint-Clet** by the merger of the Village of Saint-Clet and the Parish of Saint-Clet.
- 7 September: The Parish of Sainte-Théodosie-Calixa-Lavallée changed its name to Calixa-Lavallée.
- 21 September: Creation of the City of **Grande-Rivière** by the merger of the Municipality of Grande-Rivière, the Municipality of Grande-Rivière-Ouest and the Municipality of Petit-Pabos.
- 28 September: The Village of **Fossambault-sur-le-Lac** became a City.
- 12 October: The Township of Leeds-Partie-Est is annexed by the Municipality of **Saint-Pierre-de-Broughton**.
- 15 October: Creation of the City of **Fermont**.

=== 1975 ===
- 1 January:
  - The City of Arvida, the City of Kénogami and the Parish of Saint-Dominique-de-Jonquière are annexed by the City of Jonquière.
  - Creation of the City of Lucerne by the merger of the Town of Aylmer, the Municipality of Lucerne and the Village of Deschênes.
  - The Town of Masson, the Village of Angers, the Parish of L'Ange-Gardien, the Township of Buckingham and the Township of Notre-Dame-de-la-Salette are annexed by the Town of Buckingham.
  - The City of Touraine, The Town of Pointe-Gatineau, The Municipality of Templeton-Est, The Municipality of Templeton-Est-Partie-Est, The Municipality of Templeton-Ouest and the Village of Templeton are annexed by the Town of **Gatineau**.
  - Creation of the Municipality of **La Pêche** by the merger of the Municipality of Sainte-Cécile-de-Masham, the Village of Wakefield, the Township of Aldfield, the Township of Masham-Nord and the Township of Wakefield.
  - Creation of the Municipality of **Pontiac** by the merger of the Village of Quyon, the Township of Eardley, the Township of Onslow and the Township of Onslow-Partie-Sud.
  - Creation of the Municipality of **Val-des-Monts** by the merger of the Municipality of Perkins, the Municipality of Portland-Ouest and the Township of Wakefield-Partie-Est.
- 15 March: Creation of the Municipality of **Saint-Sébastien** by the merger of the Village of Saint-Sébastien and the Parish of Saint-Sébastien.
- 29 March: The Township of Hincks became the Municipality of **Lac-Sainte-Marie**.
- 5 April: The United Townships of Robertson-et-Pope became the Municipality of Des Ruisseaux.
- 14 June: Creation of the Municipality of **Rivière-Bleue** by the merger of the Village of Saint-Joseph-de-la-Rivière-Bleue and the Parish of Saint-Joseph-de-la-Rivière-Bleue.
- 21 June: Creation of the City of Métabetchouan by the merger of the Village of Saint-Jérôme and the Parish of Saint-Jérôme.
- 28 June: Creation of the Municipality of **Saint-Théophile** by the merger of the Village of Saint-Théophile and the Parish of Saint-Théophile-de-Beauce.
- 12 July: The Village of Saint-Bruno is annexed by the Municipality of Saint-Bruno.
- 2 August: Creation of the Municipality of Lacorne.
- 13 September: The Municipality of Sainte-Lucie changed its name to **Sainte-Lucie-des-Laurentides**.
- 20 September: The Parish of Saint-Rémi is annexed by the Town of **Saint-Rémi**.
- 1 November:
  - Creation of the Municipality of **Saint-Henri** by the merger of the Village of Saint-Henri and the Parish of Saint-Henri-de-Lauzon.
  - The Village of Durham-Sud is annexed by the Municipality of **Durham-Sud**.
- 3 November: The Town of Châteauguay-Centre is annexed by the Town of **Châteauguay**.
- 6 December: Creation of the Municipality of **Saint-Gédéon** by the merger of the Village of Saint-Gédéon and the Parish of Saint-Gédéon.
- 19 December: The Town of Saguenay is annexed by the Township of Chicoutimi.

=== 1976 ===
- 1 January:
  - The City of Chicoutimi-Nord, the Town of Rivière-du-Moulin and the Township of Chicoutimi are annexed by the City of Chicoutimi.
  - The City of Giffard, the Town of Courville, the Town of Montmorency, the Town of Villeneuve, the Municipality of Saint-Michel-Archange and the Municipality of Sainte-Thérèse-de-Lisieux are annexed by the City of Beauport.
  - Creation of the City of La Baie by the merger of the Town of Bagotville, the Town of Port-Alfred, the Municipality of Grande-Baie and the Parish of Bagotville.
  - The Town of Douville, the Town of La Providence and the Town of Saint-Joseph are annexed by the City of **Saint-Hyacinthe**.
  - The Town of Notre-Dame-des-Laurentides, the Town of Orsainville and the Municipality of Charlesbourg-Est are annexed by the City of Charlesbourg.
  - Creation of the Municipality of Contrecoeur by the merger of the Village of Contrecoeur and the Parish of Contrecoeur.
  - Creation of the Municipality of Lac-à-la-Croix by the merger of the Village of Lac-à-la-Croix and the Parish of Sainte-Croix.
  - The Municipality of Saint-Joseph-d’Alma is annexed by the City of **Alma**.
- 3 January:
  - Creation of the Municipality of **Notre-Dame-de-Montauban** by the merger of the Village of Montauban and the Village of Notre-Dame-des-Anges.
  - The Municipality of Saint-Michel-de-Mistassini is annexed by the Town of Mistassini.
- 17 April:
  - The City of Lucerne changed its name to Aylmer.
  - Creation of the Municipality of **Saint-Stanislas** by the merger of the Village of Saint-Stanislas and the Parish of Saint-Stanislas.
- 8 May: The Parish of Saint-Thomas became the Municipality of **Noyan**.
- 5 June: The Township of Aylwin became the Municipality of **Kazabazua**.
- 18 September:
  - Creation of the Municipality of **Lyster** by the merger of the Village of Lyster and the Parish of Sainte-Anastasie-de-Nelson.
  - Creation of the Municipality of **Saint-Sylvère** by the merger of the Village of Saint-Sylvère and the Parish of Saint-Sylvère.
- 9 October: The Municipality of Rivière-Boyer is annexed by the Municipality of **Saint-Henri**.
- 4 December: The Municipality of Lacadie changed its name to L'Acadie.
- 23 December:
  - Creation of the Municipality of **Lambton** by the merger of the Village of Lambton and the Township of Lambton.
  - The Municipality of Roberval is annexed by the City of **Roberval**.
  - The Municipality of Saint-Félicien is annexed by the Town of **Saint-Félicien**.
  - Creation of the Municipality of **Sainte-Marie-de-Blandford** by the merger of the Village of Sainte-Marie and the Parish of Sainte-Marie-de-Blandford.
  - The Village of L'Avenir is annexed by the Municipality of **L'Avenir**.
- 30 December: Creation of the Municipality of **Sainte-Anne-du-Lac** by the merger of the Village of Sainte-Anne-du-Lac and the Township of Décarie.

=== 1977 ===
- 15 January: The Township of **Maria** became a Municipality.
- 4 June:
  - Creation of the Municipality of **Saint-Pierre-de-Lamy**.
  - The Parish of Saint-Isidore changed its name to Laverlochère.
- 9 July:
  - Creation of the Municipality of **Sainte-Hélène-de-Bagot** by the merger of the Village of Sainte-Hélène-de-Bagot and the Parish of Sainte-Hélène.
  - The Village of Saint-Jean-Vianney is annexed by the Municipality of Shipshaw.
  - The Parish of L’Annonciation-Partie-Nord changed its name to Oka.
- 8 August: The United Townships of Masson-et-Laviolette became a Municipality.
- 20 August: The Township of **Bégin** became a Municipality.
- 1 October: Creation of the Municipality of **Sainte-Claire** by the merger of the Municipality of Louis-Joliette and the Parish of Sainte-Claire.
- 15 October: The Municipality of Shawbridge changed its name to Prévost.

=== 1978 ===
- 1 January:
  - Creation of the Municipality of **Ferland-et-Boilleau**.
  - Creation of the Municipality of **Franquelin** from territories taken from the United Townships of Les Sept-Cantons-Unis-du-Saguenay.
  - The Municipality of Lacorne changed its name to **La Corne**.
  - Creation of the Municipality of **Rémigny**.
  - Creation of the Municipality of **Saint-Dominique-du-Rosaire**.
  - Creation of the Municipality of Saint-Guillaume-de-Granada, the Municipality of Saint-Joseph-de-Cléricy and the Municipality of Saint-Norbert-de-Mont-Brun.
- 7 January: The Village of Saint-Grégoire changed its name to Mont-Saint-Grégoire.
- 11 February:
  - Creation of the Municipality of Fiedmont-et-Barraute by the merger of the Town of Barville and the Municipality of Fiedmont.
  - The Municipality of La-Visitation-de-la-Pointe-du-Lac is annexed by the Municipality of Pointe-du-Lac.
- 13 May: The Municipality of Saint-Féréol-les-Neiges changed its name to **Saint-Ferréol-les-Neiges**.
- 25 March: The Municipality of Notre-Dame is annexed by the Town of **Brossard**.
- 1 April: The Parish of Sainte-Claire-d’Assise changed its name to Rivière-Beaudette.
- 15 April: The Parish of Sainte-Marie is annexed by the Town of **Sainte-Marie**.
- 27 May: The City of Saint-Paul-l’Ermite changed its name to Le Gardeur.
- 28 June:
  - Creation of the Cree Village of **Eastmain**, the Cree Village of Fort-George, the Cree Village of Fort-Rupert, the Cree Village of Mistassini, the Cree Village of Nemiscau, the Cree Village of Nouveau-Comptoir and the Cree Village of **Waswanipi** from territories taken from the Municipality of Baie-James.
  - Creation of the Cree Village of Poste-de-la-Baleine.
- 15 July: The Township of Emberton became the Municipality of **Chartierville**.
- 9 September: The Parish of Saint-Maxime became the Municipality of Scott.
- 11 November:
  - The City of Saint-Jean changed its name to Saint-Jean-sur-Richelieu.
  - The Parish of Notre-Dame-de-la-Providence changed its name to **Notre-Dame-des-Pins**.

=== 1979 ===
- 1 January:
  - Creation of the Municipality of Beaudry, the Municipality of Bellecombe, the Municipality of Cloutier, the Municipality of Kinojévis, the Municipality of Rollet and the Municipality of Vassan.
  - Creation of the Municipality of **Laforce**.
  - Creation of the Municipality of **Lotbinière** by the merger of the Village of Lotbinière and the Parish of Saint-Louis-de-Lotbinière.
  - Creation of the Municipality of **Preissac**.
- 3 March: Creation of the Municipality of **Saint-Michel-des-Saints** by the merger of the Municipality of Masson-et-Laviolette and the Parish of Saint-Michel-des-Saints.
- 10 March: Creation of the City of **Normandin** by the merger of the Village of Normandin and the Township of Normandin.
- 14 April: Creation of the Municipality of **Saint-Agapit** by the merger of the Village of Saint-Agapitville and the Parish of Saint-Agapit-de-Beaurivage
- 23 June: The Township of Dumas became the Municipality of **Petit-Saguenay**.
- 30 June: The Township of Lochaber-Partie-Nord became the Municipality of **Saint-Sixte**.
- 25 August: Creation of the Municipality of Delisle by the merger of the Village of Saint-Cœur-de-Marie and the Township of Delisle.
- 29 December:
  - Creation of the Northern Village of **Akulivik**.
  - Creation of the Northern Village of **Kuujjuaq**.
  - Creation of the Northern Village of **Salluit**.

=== 1980 ===
- 1 January:
  - Creation of the City of Masson, the Municipality of Ange-Gardien and the Municipality of **Notre-Dame-de-la-Salette** from territories taken from the Town of Buckingham.
  - Creation of the Municipality of Arntfield, the Municipality of D'Alembert and the Municipality of Montbeillard.
  - Creation of the Municipality of Letang.
  - Creation of the Municipality of **Sainte-Gertrude-Manneville**.
  - The Village of Pascalis became the Municipality of Val-Senneville.
- 5 January:
  - The Municipality of Saint-Luc-de-Laval is annexed by the Town of **Forestville**.
  - Creation of the Municipality of **Saint-Pacôme** by the merger of the Village of Saint-Pacôme and the Parish of Saint-Pacôme.
- 2 February:
  - Creation of the Northern Village of **Aupaluk**.
  - Creation of the Northern Village of **Kangiqsualujjuaq**.
  - Creation of the Northern Village of **Tasiujaq**.
- 16 February: The Parish of Saint-Marc changed its name to Saint-Marc-sur-Richelieu.
- 22 March: Creation of the Municipality of **Bouchette** by the merger of the Township of Bouchette and the Township of Cameron.
- 12 April: The Township of Privat became the Village of Taschereau.
- 19 April: The Township of La Sarre is annexed by the Town of **La Sarre**.
- 7 June:
  - Creation of the Northern Village of **Inukjuak**.
  - Creation of the Northern Village of **Kuujjuarapik**.
- 13 September: The Village of Beaulieu changed its name to **Sainte-Pétronille**.
- 20 September: Creation of the Northern Village of **Kangiqsujuaq**.
- 27 September: The Village of **Bois-des-Filion** became a City.
- 1 November: Creation of the Northern Village of **Quaqtaq**.
- 27 December: Creation of the Municipality of **Sainte-Marthe** by the merger of the Village of Sainte-Marthe and the Parish of Sainte-Marthe.

=== 1981 ===
- 1 January:
  - Creation of the Municipality of Destor and the Municipality of Lac-Dufault.
  - Creation of the Municipality of **Rapide-Danseur**.
  - The Parish of Saint-Jean-de-Dieu is annexed by the City of **Montréal**.
- 3 January: The Municipality of Adamsville changed its name to **Brigham**.
- 17 January: Creation of the Northern Village of **Kangirsuk**.
- 28 February:
  - The Municipality of Kinojévis changed its name to McWatters.
  - The Parish of Saint-Théophile became the Municipality of Lac-à-la-Tortue.
- 4 April: The Township of Bourget changed its name to Saint-Charles-de-Bourget.
- 27 June:
  - The Municipality of Sud-Ouest-du-Canton-d’Halifax-Sud changed its name to Vianney.
  - Creation of the Northern Village of **Ivujivik**.
- 15 July: The Village of Saint-Rédempteur became a City.
- 25 July: Creation of the Municipality of **Saint-Casimir** by the merger of the Village of Saint-Casimir and the Village of Saint-Casimir-Est.
- 8 August: The Parish of Saint-Barthélemi changed its name to **Saint-Barthélemy**.
- 5 September: The Township of Saint-Jean became the Municipality of **L'Anse-Saint-Jean**.
- 10 September: Creation of the Naskapi Village of Schefferville.
- 19 September: The Village of La Reine is annexed by the Municipality of **La Reine**.
- 10 October: The Parish of La Visitation-de-la-Sainte-Vierge-de-l’Isle-du-Pads became the Municipality of **La Visitation-de-l'Île-Dupas**.
- 17 October: The Township of **Saint-Charles-de-Bourget** became a Municipality.
- 21 November: Creation of the Village of Mont-Rolland by the merger of the City of Mont-Gabriel and the Municipality of Mont-Rolland.
- 12 December:
  - The Parish of Saint-Antoine-de-Padoue-de-Kempt became the Municipality of **Padoue**.
  - Creation of the Parish of Tingwick by the merger of the Municipality of Chénier and the Municipality of Tingwick.
- 26 December: The City of Drummondville-Sud is annexed by the City of **Drummondville**.

=== 1982 ===
- 1 January:
  - Creation of the Municipality of **Berry**.
  - Creation of the Municipality of Dubuisson.
  - Creation of the Municipality of **Rivière-Héva**.
- 6 February: Creation of the Municipality of Coteau-du-Lac by the merger of the Village of Coteau-du-Lac and the Parish of Saint-Ignace-du-Coteau-du-Lac.
- 24 April: The Municipality of Petite-Matane changed its name to Petit-Matane.
- 17 July: The City of Pointe-aux-Trembles is annexed by the City of **Montréal**.
- 12 August: The City of Oka-sur-le-Lac is annexed by the Parish of Oka.
- 11 September: The Township of Ireland-Partie-Nord became the Municipality of **Saint-Adrien-d’Irlande**.
- 18 September: The City of Saint-Romuald-d’Etchemin changed its name to Saint-Romuald.
- 16 October: The Village of Saint-Cyrille became the Municipality of **Saint-Cyrille-de-Wendover**.
- 30 October: The Township of Leeds became the Municipality of **Kinnear's Mills**.
- 6 November:
  - Creation of the Municipality of **Saint-Hugues** by the merger of the Village of Saint-Hugues and the Parish of Saint-Hugues.
  - The Parish of Saint-Antoine-de-Padoue is annexed by the Municipality of **Saint-Antoine-sur-Richelieu**.
- 27 November: The Parish of Saint-Paulin-Dalibaire and the Parish of Saint-Thomas-de-Cherbourg are annexed by the Municipality of **Les Méchins**.
- 11 December: Creation of the Municipality of **Champlain** by the merger of the Village of Champlain and the Parish of La Visitation-de-Champlain.
- 18 December:
  - Creation of the Municipality of **Chesterville** by the merger of the Village of Chesterville and the Township of Chester-Ouest.
  - Creation of the Municipality of **Saint-René-de-Matane** by the merger of the Municipality of Saint-Nil and the Parish of Saint-René-de-Matane.
- 24 December: Creation of the Municipality of **Sayabec** by the merger of the Village of Sayabec and the Parish of Sainte-Marie-de-Sayabec.

=== 1983 ===
- 1 January:
  - The City of Hauterive is annexed by the City of **Baie-Comeau**.
  - Creation of the Municipality of **Authier-Nord** from territories taken from the Parish of Macamic and other unorganized territories.
  - Creation of the Municipality of La Morandière and the Municipality of Rochebaucourt.
- 26 March: Creation of the Municipality of **Baie-du-Febvre** by the merger of the Village of Baieville, the Parish of Saint-Antoine-de-la-Baie-du-Febvre and the Parish of Saint-Joseph-de-la-Baie-du-Febvre.
- 16 April: The Parish of La Visitation-de-la-Bienheureuse-Vierge-Marie became the Municipality of **La Visitation-de-Yamaska**.
- 28 May: The Parish of Saint-Félix-du-Cap-Rouge became the City of Cap-Rouge.
- 4 June: The Municipality of Rock-Forest became a City.
- 20 August: The Township of Otis became the Municipality of **Saint-Félix-d’Otis**.
- 3 September: The Parish of Notre-Dame-de-la-Doré changed its name to **La Doré**.
- 10 September: The Parish of Saint-Timothée changed its name to **Hérouxville**.
- 17 September: The Parish of Saint-Rémi changed its name to **Lac-aux-Sables**.
- 15 October: The Municipality of Saint-Placide-de-Béarn changed its name to **Béarn**.
- 29 October: Creation of the City of Moisie by the merger of the Municipality of Moisie and the Municipality of Rivière-Pigou.
- 31 December: Creation of the Municipality of Laterrière by the merger of the Village of Laterrière and the Parish of Notre-Dame-de-Laterrière.

=== 1984 ===
- 18 February: The Parish of Sainte-Clothilde changed its name to Sainte-Clothilde-de-Châteauguay.
- 10 March: The Parish of Sainte-Clothilde-de-Châteauguay changed its name to Sainte-Clotilde-de-Châteauguay.
- 17 March: The Municipality of Lac-des-Écorces changed its name to Beaux-Rivages.
- 14 April:
  - The Town of Pointe-du-Moulin is annexed by the Parish of Notre-Dame-de-l'Île-Perrot.
  - The Municipality of Saint-Édouard changed its name to **Saint-Édouard-de-Maskinongé**.
  - The Parish of Saint-Amable became a Municipality.
- 21 April:
  - Creation of the Municipality of Grondines by the merger of the Village of Saint-Charles-des-Grondines and the Parish of Saint-Charles-des-Grondines.
  - Creation of the Parish of **Saint-Alexis-des-Monts** by the merger of the Municipality of Belleau and the Parish of Saint-Alexis.
- 21 July:
  - The Municipality of Saint-Étienne changed its name to Saint-Étienne-de-Lauzon.
  - The Municipality of Saint-Firmin changed its name to **Baie-Sainte-Catherine**.
  - The Village of La Station-du-Coteau changed its name to Coteau-Station.
- 8 September: The City of De Grasse is annexed by the City of Moisie.
- 29 September:
  - Creation of the Municipality of **Saint-Patrice-de-Beaurivage** by the merger of the Village of Saint-Patrice-de-Beaurivage and the Parish of Saint-Patrice-de-Beaurivage.
  - The Parish of Sainte-Catherine became the Municipality of Sainte-Catherine-de-la-Jacques-Cartier.
  - The Township of Turgeon became the Village of Sainte-Véronique.
- 20 October: The Parish of Sainte-Clothilde became the Municipality of **Sainte-Clotilde-de-Beauce**.
- 15 December: The Parish of Saint-Joachim-de-Tourelle became the Municipality of Tourelle.

=== 1985 ===
- 1 January: Creation of the Municipality of **Kipawa**.
- 19 January: The Township of Nelson is annexed by the Parish of Sainte-Agathe.
- 9 February: The Village of **Saint-Ambroise** became a Municipality.
- 16 February:
  - The Village of Sainte-Pudentienne changed its name to Roxton-Pond.
  - The Parish of Saint-François-de-Sales-de-la-Rivière-du-Sud became the Municipality of **Saint-François-de-la-Rivière-du-Sud**.
- 23 February: The Parish of Sainte-Pudentienne changed its name to Roxton-Pond.
- 9 March: Creation of the Municipality of **Les Cèdres** by the merger of the City of Les Cèdres and the Parish of Saint-Joseph-de-Soulanges.
- 8 June: The Parish of Saint-Louis-de-Terrebonne is annexed by the City of **Terrebonne**.
- 3 July: The Parish of Saint-Gabriel became a Municipality.
- 28 September: Creation of the Municipality of **Frelighsburg** by the merger of the Village of Frelighsburg and the Parish of Frelighsburg.
- 5 October: The Municipality of Saint-Gabriel-Ouest is annexed by the Municipality of **Saint-Gabriel-de-Valcartier**.
- 12 October: The Village of Saint-Herménégilde is annexed by the Municipality of **Saint-Herménégilde**.

=== 1986 ===
- 15 February:
  - The Municipality of Saint-Laurent changed its name to **Gallichan**.
  - The Township of Kénogami became the Municipality of Lac-Kénogami.
- 22 February: Creation of the Municipality of **Saint-Pierre-les-Becquets** by the merger of the Village of Les Becquets and the Parish of Saint-Pierre-les-Becquets,
- 29 March: The Parish of Saint-François-Xavier-de-Batiscan became the Municipality of **Batiscan**.
- 12 April: The Parish of Saint-François-Xavier-de-la-Petite-Rivière became the Municipality of **Petite-Rivière-Saint-François**.
- 10 May: The Municipality of Messine changed its name to **Messines**.
- 17 May: The Township of Montminy became the Municipality of **Saint-Paul-de-Montminy**.
- 21 June:
  - The Parish of Saint-Charles-Borromée became a Municipality.
  - The Township of Hereford became the Municipality of **East Hereford**.
- 5 July: Creation of the City of **Rouyn-Noranda** by the merger of the City of Noranda and the City of Rouyn.
- 19 July:
  - The Parish of Saint-Jacques-de-Parisville changed its name to **Parisville**.
  - The Parish of **Sainte-Hedwidge** became a Municipality.
  - The Township of Woodbridge became the Municipality of **Saint-Bruno-de-Kamouraska**.
- 30 August:
  - The Municipality of Lac-à-la-Tortue became a Parish.
  - The Municipality of Saguay became the Village of **Lac-Saguay**.
- 18 October: The Parish of Saint-Louis-de-Pintendre became the Municipality of Pintendre.
- 20 December:
  - Creation of the Municipality of **Val-Brillant** by the merger of the Village of Val-Brillant and the Parish of Saint-Pierre-du-Lac.
  - The Village of Saint-Jovite became a City.
  - Creation of the Northern Village of **Umiujaq**.

=== 1987 ===
- 1 January: Creation of the Municipality of **La Bostonnais**.
- 17 January:
  - The Municipality of Amos-Est is annexed by the City of **Amos**.
  - The Parish of Sainte-Elizabeth changed its name to Sainte-Élisabeth.
- 7 February:
  - The Parish of Saint-Antoine-de-la-Rivière-du-Loup became a Municipality.
  - The Parish of Saint-Antoine-de-Pontbriand became the Municipality of Pontbriand.
- 11 February: Creation of the Municipality of Saint-André by the merger of the Village of Andréville and the Parish of Saint-André.
- 1 April: Creation of the Municipality of **Kamouraska** by the merger of the Village of Kamouraska and the Parish of Saint-Louis-de-Kamouraska.
- 11 April: The Municipality of Ireland changed its name to **Irlande**.
- 9 May: Creation of the Municipality of **Saint-Bernard** by the merger of the Village of Saint-Bernard and the Parish of Saint-Bernard.
- 18 July:
  - The City of Ancienne-Lorette changed its name to **L'Ancienne-Lorette**.
  - The City of Île-Cadieux changed its name to **L'Île-Cadieux**.
  - The City of Île-Dorval changed its name to **L'Île-Dorval**.
  - The City of Île-Perrot changed its name to **L'Île-Perrot**.
  - The Municipality of Ange-Gardien changed its name to **L'Ange-Gardien**.
  - The Municipality of Escoumins changed its name to **Les Escoumins**.
  - The Municipality of Île-d'Anticosti changed its name to **L'Île-d'Anticosti**.
  - The Municipality of Île-du-Havre-Aubert changed its name to L’Île-du-Havre-Aubert.
  - The Village of Ange-Gardien changed its name to L'Ange-Gardien.
  - The Village of Bic became the Municipality of Le Bic.
  - The Village of Île-d’Entrée changed its name to L’Île-d’Entrée.
  - The Parish of Saint-Charles-Boromé changed its name to Saint-Charles-Borromée.
  - The Parish of **Sainte-Anne-des-Plaines** became a City.
  - The Parish of Trinité-des-Monts changed its name to **La Trinité-des-Monts**.
  - The Township of Isle-aux-Allumettes-Partie-Est changed its name to L'Isle-aux-Allumettes-Partie-Est.
  - The Township of Isle-des-Allumettes changed its name to L’Isle-aux-Allumettes.
  - The Cree Village of Fort-George changed its name to **Chisasibi**.
  - The Cree Village of Nouveau-Comptoir changed its name to **Wemindji**.
- 31 October: The Parish of Saint-Cyprien changed its name to Saint-Cyprien-de-Napierville.
- 26 December: Creation of the Municipality of **Yamachiche** by the merger of the Village of Yamachiche and the Parish of Sainte-Anne-d’Yamachiche.

=== 1988 ===
- 20 February:
  - The Township of Taché became the Municipality of **Saint-Nazaire**.
  - The United Townships of Wendover-et-Simpson became the Municipality of Saint-Charles-de-Drummond.
- 27 February: Creation of the Municipality of **Saint-Paulin** by the merger of the Village of Saint-Paulin, the Parish of Saint-Paulin and the Township of Hunterstown.
- 26 March: The Municipality of Letang is annexed by the City of **Témiscaming**.
- 30 April: The Parish of Sainte-Angèle became the Municipality of **Sainte-Angèle-de-Prémont**.
- 21 May: The Parish of **Grandes-Piles** became a Village.
- 10 September: The Parish of Sainte-Brigitte-de-Laval became a Municipality.
- 17 September: Creation of the Municipality of **Saint-Alexandre** by the merger of the Village of Saint-Alexandre and the Parish of Saint-Alexandre.
- 29 October:
  - The Parish of Saint-Jean-Baptiste-Vianney became the Municipality of **Saint-Vianney**.
  - The Parish of Saint-Mathias changed its name to Saint-Mathias-sur-Richelieu.
- 2 November: The Parish of Sainte-Anne-de-la-Pointe-au-Père became the Municipality of Pointe-au-Père.
- 3 December: The Township of Dorion became the Municipality of **Cayamant**.
- 31 December:
  - The Municipality of Saint-Antoine-de-la-Rivière-du-Loup is annexed by the City of **Louiseville**.
  - Creation of the Municipality of **Saint-Polycarpe** by the merger of the Village of Saint-Polycarpe and the Parish of Saint-Polycarpe.
  - The Parish of Saint-Marcel became the Municipality of **Saint-Marcel-de-Richelieu**.

=== 1989 ===
- 1 January:
  - Creation of the Municipality of **Cantley** from territories taken from the City of **Gatineau**.
  - The Township of Letellier and the United Townships of Les Sept-Cantons-Unis-du-Saguenay are closed and dissolved.
- 7 January: The Municipality of Fleuriault is annexed by the Municipality of Saint-Gabriel.
- 22 March: Creation of the Municipality of **Vallée-Jonction** by the merger of the Village of Vallée-Jonction and the Parish of L’Enfant-Jésus.
- 1 April:
  - The Parish of Notre-Dame-de-Bon-Secours became a Municipality.
  - The Parish of Saint-Dunstan-du-Lac-Beauport became the Municipality of **Lac-Beauport**.
  - The Township of Ascot became a Municipality.
- 8 April: The Township of Ristigouche became the Municipality of **Saint-André-de-Restigouche**.
- 26 April: Creation of the Municipality of **Sainte-Angèle-de-Mérici** by the merger of the Village of Sainte-Angèle-de-Mérici and the Parish of Sainte-Angèle-de-Mérici.
- 10 May: Creation of the Municipality of **Sainte-Anne-de-la-Pérade** by the merger of the Village of La Pérade and the Parish of Sainte-Anne-de-la-Pérade.
- 7 June: Creation of the Municipality of **Sainte-Thècle** by the merger of the Village of Sainte-Thècle and the Parish of Sainte-Thècle.
- 2 August: The Municipality of Pointe-au-Père became a City.
- 30 August: The Municipality of Laterrière became a City.
- 1 September: Creation of the City of Lévis-Lauzon by the merger of the City of Lauzon and the City of Lévis.
- 2 September: Creation of the Northern Village of Povungnituk.
- 18 November: The City of Pointe-au-Père became a Municipality.
- 29 November: Creation of the Municipality of L’Islet-sur-Mer by the merger of the Village of L’Islet-sur-Mer and the Parish of Notre-Dame-de-Bon-Secours-de-l’Islet.
- 27 December:
  - Creation of the Municipality of Deschambault by the merger of the Village of Deschambault and the Parish of Saint-Joseph-de-Deschambault.
  - The Village of Clarenceville is annexed by the Municipality of Saint-Georges-de-Clarenceville.

=== 1990 ===
- 1 January: Creation of the Municipality of **Blanc-Sablon** and the Municipality of **Bonne-Espérance** from territories taken from the Municipality of Côte-Nord-du-Golfe-Saint-Laurent.
- 17 January: Creation of the Municipality of **Rivière-Beaudette** by the merger of the Village of Rivière-Beaudette and the Parish of Rivière-Beaudette.
- 11 April: Creation of the Municipality of **Albanel** by the merger of the Village of Albanel and the Township of Albanel.
- 18 April:
  - Creation of the Municipality of Port-Daniel by the merger of the Township of Port-Daniel-Partie-Est and the Township of Port-Daniel-Partie-Ouest.
  - The Village of Saint-Zacharie is annexed by the Municipality of **Saint-Zacharie**.
- 25 April: Creation of the Municipality of Saint-Timothée by the merger of the Village of Saint-Timothée and the Parish of Saint-Timothée.
- 28 April: The Township of Hull-Partie-Ouest became the Municipality of **Chelsea**.
- 23 May:
  - The City of Saint-Georges-Ouest is annexed by the City of **Saint-Georges**.
  - Creation of the Municipality of **Deschaillons-sur-Saint-Laurent** by the merger of the Village of Deschaillons and the Village of Deschaillons-sur-Saint-Laurent.
- 1 August: The City of Saint-David-de-l’Auberivière is annexed by the City of Lévis-Lauzon.
- 20 October: The Municipality of Pointe-au-Père became a City.

=== 1991 ===
Twenty-seven municipality modifications were approved in 1991.

- 1 January:
  - Creation of the Communauté urbaine de l'Outaouais, comprising the cities of Aylmer, Buckingham, Gatineau, Hull, and Masson.
  - Creation of Les Collines-de-l'Outaouais Regional County Municipality.
  - The Communauté régionale de l'Outaouais became defunct in conjunction with the above.
- 16 January: The Parish of Saint-Benoît-Joseph-Labre is annexed by the City of **Amqui**.
- 2 February:
  - The Municipality of Grantham-Ouest changed its name to Grantham.
  - The Municipality of Saint-Godard-de-Lejeune changed its name to **Lejeune**.
  - The Municipality of Saint-Juste-de-Bretenières changed its name to **Saint-Just-de-Bretenières**.
  - The Village of Annaville changed its name to **Saint-Célestin**.
  - The Village of Saint-Émile became a Municipality.
  - The Parish of Sacré-Coeur-de-Jésus became the Municipality of Sacré-Coeur-de-Crabtree.
  - The Parish of **Sainte-Martine** became a Municipality.
  - The Township of Windsor became the Municipality of **Val-Joli**.
- 9 February:
  - The Village of Sainte-Clothilde-de-Horton changed its name to Sainte-Clotilde-de-Horton.
  - The Parish of Saint-Janvier became the Municipality of **Chazel**.
- 13 February: The Municipality of Entrelacs moved from Les Pays-d'en-Haut Regional County Municipality to Matawinie Regional County Municipality, and therefore from Laurentides region to Lanaudière region.
- 9 March: The City of Lévis-Lauzon changed its name to **Lévis**.
- 23 March: The Township of Marchand became a Municipality.
- 17 April: The Parish of Saint-Ours is annexed by the City of **Saint-Ours**.
- 20 April: The Parish of Saint-Alphonse-de-Rodriguez became the Municipality of **Saint-Alphonse-Rodriguez**.
- 4 May:
  - The Parish of **Saint-Mathias-sur-Richelieu** became a Municipality.
  - The Parish of Sainte-Agathe became the Municipality of Sainte-Agathe-Nord.
- 31 May: The City of Gagnon is closed and dissolved.
- 14 September:
  - The Parish of **Saint-Épiphane** became a Municipality.
  - The Parish of Sainte-Christine became the Municipality of **Sainte-Christine-d'Auvergne**.
- 21 September: The Parish of **Saint-Bonaventure** became a Municipality.
- 5 October: The Parish of Saint-Luc became the Municipality of **Saint-Luc-de-Vincennes**.
- 13 November: Creation of the Municipality of **Chertsey** by the merger of the Parish of Lac-Paré and the Township of Chertsey.
- 23 November:
  - The Village of Saint-Jean-de-Boischatel became the Municipality of **Boischatel**.
  - The Parish of Saints-Gervais-et-Protais became the Municipality of **Saint-Gervais**.
- 31 December: Creation of the Municipality of **Saint-Alban** by the merger of the Village of Saint-Alban and the Parish of Saint-Alban.

=== 1992 ===
Fifteen municipality modifications were approved in 1992.

- 22 January: The Parish of Saint-Thomas moved from D'Autray Regional County Municipality to Joliette Regional County Municipality.
- 29 January: The Parish of Saint-Pierre-de-Sorel is annexed by the City of Sorel.
- 22 April: The Parish of L'Assomption is annexed by the City of **L'Assomption**.
- 16 May: The Parish of Saint-Élie-d'Orford became a Municipality.
- 6 June: The Parish of Notre-Dame-des-Prairies became a Municipality.
- 13 June:
  - The Parish of Saint-Michel became the Municipality of **Saint-Michel-de-Bellechasse**.
  - The Township of **Stoke** became a Municipality.
- 18 July: The City of Masson changed its name to Masson-Angers.
- 8 August:
  - The Parish of Saint-Lin became a Municipality.
  - The Parish of **Sainte-Mélanie** became a Municipality.
- 15 August:
  - The Township of Hinchinbrook changed its name to Hinchinbrooke.
  - The Unorganized Territory of Lac-Fériol changed its name to Lac-aux-Castors.
  - The Unorganized Territory of Lac-Marie-Lefranc changed its name to Lac-Marie-Le Franc.
  - The Cree Reserved Land of Mistassini was renamed to Mistissini.
- 3 October: The United Townships of Risborough-et-Partie-de-Marlow became the Municipality of Risborough.
- 24 October: The Parish of Saint-Barnabé became the Municipality of **Saint-Barnabé-Sud**.
- 5 December:
  - The Parish of **Saint-Mathieu-de-Beloeil** became a Municipality.
  - The Township of **Montcalm** became a Municipality.

=== 1993 ===
Thirty-one municipality modifications were approved in 1993.

- 1 January: Creation of the Municipality of **Saint-Augustin** from territories taken from the Municipality of Côte-Nord-du-Golfe-Saint-Laurent.
- 6 March: The Parish of **Sainte-Béatrix** became a Municipality.
- 10 March:
  - Creation of the Municipality of **Saint-Vallier** by the merger of the Village of Saint-Vallier and the Parish of Saint-Vallier.
  - Creation of the Municipality of **Wotton** by the merger of the Village of Wottonville and the Township of Wotton.
- 1 May: The Parish of Saint-Mathieu became the Municipality of **Saint-Mathieu-d'Harricana**.
- 15 May:
  - The Parish of Saint-Armand-Ouest became the Municipality of **Saint-Armand**.
  - The Parish of **Saint-Benoît-Labre** became a Municipality.
  - The Parish of Saint-Blaise became the Municipality of **Saint-Blaise-sur-Richelieu**.
  - The Parish of **Saint-Jean-de-Matha** became a Municipality.
  - The Township of Ponsonby became the Municipality of **Boileau**.
- 31 May: Creation of the Indian settlement of Oujé-Bougoumou from territories taken from the Municipality of Baie-James.
- 12 June:
  - The Village of Crabtree became a Municipality.
  - The Parish of **Saint-Thomas** became a Municipality.
  - The Parish of **Sainte-Justine** became a Municipality.
- 23 June: Creation of the City of Victoriaville-Arthabaska by the merger of the City of Arthabaska, the City of Victoriaville, and the Parish of Sainte-Victoire-d'Arthabaska.
- 21 July:
  - The Municipality of Fleurimont became a City.
  - The Municipality of Saint-Émile became a City.
  - the Parish of Saint-Louis-de-France became a City.
- 25 August: The Municipality of Haute-Mauricie is annexed by the City of **La Tuque**.
- 22 September: Creation of the Municipality of **Saint-Isidore** by the merger of the Village of Saint-Isidore and the Parish of Saint-Isidore.
- 30 October: The Parish of Saint-François-Xavier-des-Hauteurs became the Municipality of Hauteurs.
- 7 November: Elections were held in nearly all municipalities of Quebec.
- 8 December: Creation of the Municipality of **Saint-Raphaël** by the merger of the Village of Saint-Raphaël and the Parish of Saint-Raphaël.
- 18 December:
  - The Municipality of Sainte-Marthe-du-Cap-de-la-Madeleine changed its name to Sainte-Marthe-du-Cap.
  - The Municipality of Stukely-Sud changed its name to Stukely.
  - The Parish of Saint-Venant-de-Hereford became the Municipality of **Saint-Venant-de-Paquette**.
  - The Township of Shipton became a Municipality.
- 22 December:
  - The Municipality of Grantham is annexed by the City of **Drummondville**.
  - Creation of the Municipality of **Saint-Charles-de-Bellechasse** by the merger of the Village of Saint-Charles and the Parish of Saint-Charles-Borromée.
- 24 December: The Indian reserve of Sept-Îles changed its name to Uashat.
- 29 December: Creation of the Municipality of **Armagh** by the merger of the Village of Armagh and the Parish of Saint-Cajetan-d'Armagh.

=== 1994 ===
Twenty-seven municipality modifications were approved in 1994.

- 1 January: Creation of the Municipality of **Gros-Mécatina** from territories taken from the Municipality of Côte-Nord-du-Golfe-Saint-Laurent.
- 5 January:
  - Creation of the Municipality of **Barraute** by the merger of the Municipality of Fiedmont-et-Barraute and the Village of Barraute.
  - Creation of the Municipality of L'Île-aux-Coudres by the merger of the Municipality of Saint-Bernard-de-l'Île-aux-Coudres and the Parish of Saint-Louis-de-l'Isle-aux-Coudres.
  - The Village of East Broughton Station is annexed by the Municipality of **East Broughton**.
- 16 February: Creation of the Municipality of **Lorrainville** by the merger of the Village of Lorrainville and the Parish of Notre-Dame-de-Lourdes-de-Lorrainville.
- 19 February:
  - The Parish of Sainte-Émilie-de-l’Énergie became the Municipality of **Sainte-Émélie-de-l'Énergie**.
  - The United Townships of Suffolk-et-Addington became the Municipality of **Saint-Émile-de-Suffolk**.
- 16 March: Creation of the City of **Vaudreuil-Dorion** by the merger of the City of Dorion and the City of Vaudreuil.
- 13 April:
  - Creation of the Municipality of Saint-Côme-de-Linière by the merger of the Village of Linière and the Parish of Saint-Côme-de-Kennebec.
  - Creation of the Municipality of **Saint-Léonard-d'Aston** by the merger of the Municipality of Saint-Léonard and the Village of Saint-Léonard-d'Aston.
- 18 May: Creation of the Municipality of Coteaux by the merger of the Village of Coteau-Landing and the Village Coteau-Station.
- 8 June: The Municipality of Saint-Timothée became a City.
- 22 June: Creation of the Municipality of **Compton** by the merger of the Village of Compton and the Township of Compton.
- 23 July:
  - The City of Victoriaville-Arthabaska changed its name to **Victoriaville**.
  - The Parish of **Saint-Marc-sur-Richelieu** became a Municipality.
  - The Township of **Kiamika** became a Municipality.
- 3 August: Creation of the Municipality of **Saint-Placide** by the merger of the Village of Saint-Placide and the Parish of Saint-Placide..
- 17 August:
  - The Municipality of Saint-Côme-de-Linière changed its name to **Saint-Côme-Linière**.
  - Creation of the Municipality of **Saint-Liboire** by the merger of the Village of Saint-Liboire and the Parish of Saint-Liboire.
- 10 September: The Parish of Saint-Lazare became the Municipality of **Saint-Lazare-de-Bellechasse**.
- 21 September: Creation of the City of Bernières-Saint-Nicolas by the merger of the City of Saint-Nicolas and the Municipality of Bernières.
- 24 September:
  - The Municipality of Hauteurs changed its name to **Les Hauteurs**.
  - The Indian reserves of Maniwaki and Restigouche changed their names to Kitigan Zibi and Listiguj.
- 30 November:
  - Creation of the Municipality of **Saint-Elzéar** by the merger of the Village of Saint-Elzéar and the Municipality of Saint-Elzéar-de-Beauce.
  - Creation of the Municipality of **Saint-Georges-de-Windsor** by the merger of the Village of Saint-Georges-de-Windsor and the Township of Saint-Georges-de-Windsor.
  - Creation of the Municipality of **Saint-Norbert-d'Arthabaska** by the merger of the Municipality of Chester-Nord and the Parish of Saint-Norbert-d'Arthabaska.
- 14 December: The Municipality of Rivière-Blanche is annexed by the City of **Thetford Mines**.
- 21 December: Creation of the Municipality of **Mont-Saint-Grégoire** by the merger of the Village of Mont-Saint-Grégoire and the Parish of Saint-Grégoire-le-Grand.

=== 1995 ===
Twenty-seven municipality modifications were approved in 1995.

- 1 January: Annexation of the Unorganized Territories of Lac-aux-Castors and Lac-Marie-Le Franc to the Township of La Minerve.
- 11 February: The Village of McMasterville became a Municipality.
- 15 February:
  - Creation of the City of La Malbaie-Pointe-au-Pic by the merger of the City of La Malbaie and the Village of Pointe-au-Pic.
  - Creation of the City of **Stanstead** by the merger of the City of Rock Island, the Village of Beebe Plain and the Village of Stanstead Plain.
  - The Municipality of Brompton Gore is annexed by the Municipality of **Racine**.
- 22 February: Creation of the Municipality of **Saint-Germain-de-Grantham** by the merger of the Village of Saint-Germain-de-Grantham and the Parish of Saint-Germain-de-Grantham.
- 4 March:
  - The Municipality of Saint-Jacques-de-Dupuy changed its name to **Dupuy**.
  - The Parish of **Saint-Antoine-de-Tilly** became a Municipality.
- 8 March: The Northern village of Povungnituk changed its name to **Puvirnituq**.
- 22 March:
  - Creation of the Municipality of **Saint-Charles-sur-Richelieu** by the merger of the Village of Saint-Charles-sur-Richelieu and the Parish of Saint-Charles.
  - The Parish of Saint-Raphaël-de-l’Île-Bizard became the City of L’Île-Bizard.
- 29 March:
  - Creation of the Municipality of **Scott** by the merger of the Village of Scott and the Municipality of Taschereau-Fortier.
  - The Parish of Saint-Raymond is annexed by the City of **Saint-Raymond**.
- 22 April: The Village of Daveluyville became a Municipality.
- 6 May: The Parish of **Saint-Bruno-de-Guigues** became a Municipality.
- 27 May: The Parish of Saint-Augustin-de-Desmaures became a Municipality.
- 26 June: The Municipality of Coteaux changed its name to **Les Coteaux**.
- 28 June: The Parish of La Plaine became a City.
- 2 September: The Township of Halifax-Sud became the Municipality of **Saint-Ferdinand**.
- 27 September:
  - Creation of the Municipality of **Dixville** by the merger of the Municipality of Saint-Mathieu-de-Dixville and the Village of Dixville.
  - Creation of the Municipality of **Hatley** by the merger of the Village of Hatley and the Township of Hatley-Partie-Ouest.
- 7 October: Annexation of the Unorganized Territory of Roulier to the Township of Nédélec.
- 11 October:
  - Creation of the Municipality of **Dudswell** by the merger of the Village of Bishopton, the Village of Marbleton and the Township of Dudswell.
  - The Village of Saint-Wenceslas is annexed by the Municipality of **Saint-Wenceslas**.
- 8 November: Creation of the Municipality of **Saint-Guillaume** by the merger of the Village of Saint-Guillaume and the Parish of Saint-Guillaume.
- 29 November: Creation of the Municipality of Rigaud by the merger of the City of Rigaud and the Parish of Sainte-Madeleine-de-Rigaud.
- 9 December: Annexation of the Unorganized Territories of Lac-Marcotte and Lac-au-Sorcier to the Parish of Saint-Alexis-des-Monts.
- 13 December: The Municipality of Saint-Guillaume-de Granada is annexed by the City of **Rouyn-Noranda**.

=== 1996 ===
Twenty-one municipality modifications were approved in 1996.

- 3 January:
  - Creation of the City of **Pont-Rouge** by the merger of the Municipality of Sainte-Jeanne-de-Pont-Rouge and the Village of Pont-Rouge.
  - The Municipality of Rivière-du-Gouffre and the Parish of Baie-Saint-Paul are annexed by the City of **Baie-Saint-Paul**.
  - Creation of the Municipality of Saint-Faustin-Lac-Carré by the merger of the Municipality of Saint-Faustin and the Village of Lac-Carré.
  - Creation of the Municipality of **Sainte-Monique** by the merger of the Village of Sainte-Monique and the Parish of Sainte-Monique.
- 10 January: Creation of the Municipality of **Sainte-Félicité** by the merger of the Village of Sainte-Félicité and the Parish of Sainte-Félicité.
- 16 March: The Parish of **Saint-Jude** became a Municipality.
- 8 May:
  - The Municipality of Côte-Nord-du-Golfe-Saint-Laurent changed its name to **Côte-Nord-du-Golfe-du-Saint-Laurent**.
  - The Cree Village of Fort-Rupert changed its name to **Waskaganish**.
  - The Cree Village of Mistassini changed its name to **Mistissini**.
  - The Cree Village of Poste-de-la-Baleine changed its name to **Whapmagoostui**.
  - The Naskapi Village of Schefferville changed its name to **Kawawachikamach**.
- 25 May: The Municipality of Notre-Dame-de-Lourdes-de-Ham changed its name to **Notre-Dame-de-Ham**.
- 8 June: The Parish of Saint-Octave-de-Dosquet became the Municipality of **Dosquet**.
- 12 June:
  - The Municipality of Saint-Méthode is annexed by the City of **Saint-Félicien**.
  - The City of Bromptonville moved from Le Val-Saint-François Regional County Municipality to Sherbrooke Regional County Municipality.
  - The Township of Brompton moved from Le Val-Saint-François Regional County Municipality to Sherbrooke Regional County Municipality.
- 6 July: Annexation of the Unorganized Territories of Lac-Mingo and Lac-Quentin to the City of Senneterre.
- 27 July: The Municipality of Grande-Vallée became a Parish.
- 3 August: The Parish of Saint-Philippe became a Municipality.
- 21 August: Creation of the Municipality of **Chénéville** by the merger of the Municipality of Vinoy and the Village of Chénéville.
- 24 August: The City of Bernières-Saint-Nicolas changed its name to Saint-Nicolas.
- 23 October: The Municipality of Sacré-Coeur-de-Crabtree is annexed by the Municipality of Crabtree.
- 4 December: Creation of the Municipality of **Saint-Sylvestre** by the merger of the Village of Saint-Sylvestre and the Parish of Saint-Sylvestre.
- 11 December: Creation of the Municipality of Weedon by the merger of the Village of Weedon-Centre and the Township of Weedon.
- 14 December:
  - The Village of **Pointe-Calumet** became a Municipality.
  - The Parish of **L'Ascension** became a Municipality.
- 31 December: Creation of the Municipality of **Saint-Victor** by the merger of the Village of Saint-Victor and the Municipality of Saint-Victor-de-Tring.

=== 1997 ===
Fifty-seven municipality modifications were approved in 1997.

- 2 January: Creation of the City of **Neuville** by the merger of the Village of Neuville and the Parish of Pointe-aux-Trembles.
- 29 January: The Municipality of Lac-Dufault is annexed by the City of **Rouyn-Noranda**.
- 26 March:
  - Creation of the Municipality of **Aston-Jonction** by the merger of the Village of Aston-Jonction and the Parish of Saint-Raphaël-Partie-Sud.
  - Creation of the Municipality of **Sainte-Clotilde-de-Horton** by the merger of the Municipality of Saint-Jacques-de-Horton, the Village of Sainte-Clotilde-de-Horton, the Parish of Sainte-Clothilde-de-Horton.
- 5 April:
  - The Municipality of Longue-Pointe changed its name to **Longue-Pointe-de-Mingan**.
  - The Village of Deauville became a Municipality.
  - The Parish of Bellefeuille became a City.
- 12 April: The Parish of **Saint-Urbain-Premier** became a Municipality.
- 30 April: The Municipality of Saint-Malo moved from Le Haut-Saint-François Regional County Municipality to Coaticook Regional County Municipality.
- 3 May:
  - The Municipality of **Bonaventure** became a City.
  - The Municipality of **Contrecoeur** became a City.
  - The Municipality of Lac-Saint-Charles became a City.
- 28 May: Creation of the Municipality of Saint-Paul-du-Nord-Sault-au-Mouton by the merger of the Municipality of Saint-Paul-du-Nord and the Village of Sault-au-Mouton.
- 14 June: The Village of Lafontaine became a City.
- 28 June: The Parish of Saint-Fidèle-de-Mont-Murray became the Municipality of Saint-Fidèle.
- 5 July:
  - The Parish of Saint-Alexandre became the Municipality of **Saint-Alexandre-de-Kamouraska**.
  - The Parish of Saint-Luc became the Municipality of Saint-Luc-de-Matane.
  - The United Townships of Waltham-et-Bryson became the Municipality of **Waltham**.
- 19 July:
  - The Municipality of Saint-Norbert-de-Mont-Brun changed its name to Mont-Brun.
  - The Village of Saint-Gédéon became the Municipality of **Saint-Gédéon-de-Beauce**.
  - The Parish of Saint-Bernard-Partie-Sud became the Municipality of **Saint-Bernard-de-Michaudville**.
  - The Parish of Saint-Hubert became the Municipality of **Saint-Hubert-de-Rivière-du-Loup**.
  - The Township of Stanbridge became the Municipality of **Stanbridge East**.
- 26 July: The Parish of Saint-Albert-de-Warwick became the Municipality of **Saint-Albert**.
- 16 August:
  - The Municipality of Saint-Magloire-de-Bellechasse changed its name to **Saint-Magloire**.
  - The Parish of Saint-Raphaël-d'Albertville became the Municipality of **Albertville**.
- 20 August:
  - The Municipality of Paspébiac-Ouest is annexed by the Municipality of Paspébiac.
  - The administrative region of Mauricie–Bois-Francs was split into the administrative regions of Mauricie and Centre-du-Québec.
- 23 August:
  - The Indian reserve of Les Escoumins changed its name to Essipit.
  - The Unorganized Territory of Lac-Bricault changed its name to Lac-Metei.
  - The Indian reserve of Manouane changed its name to Manawan.
  - The Indian reserve of Weymontachie changed its name to Wemotaci.
- 27 August: The Village of Mont-Rolland is annexed by the City of **Sainte-Adèle**.
- 13 September:
  - The Municipality of Saint-Honoré changed its name to **Saint-Honoré-de-Témiscouata**.
  - The Parish of **Saint-Joseph-du-Lac** became a Municipality.
  - The Parish of Saint-Pierre became the Municipality of **Saint-Pierre-de-l’Île-d’Orléans**.
- 27 September:
  - The Municipality of Saint-Eugène changed its name to **Saint-Eugène-d'Argentenay**.
  - The Parish of Notre-Dame-des-Neiges-des-Trois-Pistoles became the Municipality of **Notre-Dame-des-Neiges**.
- 11 October: The Parish of Saint-Luc became the Municipality of **Saint-Luc-de-Bellechasse**.
- 18 October: The Parish of Saint-Cléophas became the Municipality of **Saint-Cléophas-de-Brandon**.
- 2 November: Elections were held in nearly all municipalities of Quebec.
- 26 November: Creation of the Municipality of **Laurierville** by the merger of the Municipality of Sainte-Julie and the Village of Laurierville.
- 6 December: The Parish of Saint-Édouard-de-Frampton became the Municipality of **Frampton**.
- 17 December:
  - Creation of the City of **Dolbeau-Mistassini** by the merger of the City of Dolbeau and the City of Mistassini.
  - Creation of the Municipality of **Lac-au-Saumon** by the merger of the Municipality of Saint-Edmond and the Village of Lac-au-Saumon.
  - Creation of the Municipality of **Roxton Pond** by the merger of the Village of Roxton Pond and the Parish of Roxton Pond.
  - Creation of the Municipality of **Saint-André-Avellin** by the merger of the Village of Saint-André-Avellin and the Parish of Saint-André-Avellin.
  - Creation of the Municipality of **Sainte-Sophie-d'Halifax** by the merger of the Municipality of Sainte-Sophie and the Township of Halifax-Nord.
- 24 December:
  - Creation of the Municipality of **Ferme-Neuve** by the merger of the Village of Ferme-Neuve and the Parish of Ferme-Neuve.
  - The Municipality of Fontainebleau is annexed by the Municipality of **Weedon**.
  - Creation of the Municipality of **La Patrie** by the merger of the Village of La Patrie and the Township of Ditton.
  - Creation of the Municipality of **Saint-Denis-sur-Richelieu** by the merger of the Village of Saint-Denis and the Parish of Saint-Denis.
  - Creation of the Municipality of **Saint-Éphrem-de-Beauce** by the merger of the Village of Saint-Éphrem-de-Tring and the Parish of Saint-Éphrem-de-Beauce.
  - Creation of the Municipality of **Saint-Félix-de-Valois** by the merger of the Village of Saint-Félix-de-Valois and the Parish of Saint-Félix-de-Valois.
  - Creation of the Municipality of **Saint-Isidore-de-Clifton** by the merger of the Municipality of Saint-Isidore-d'Auckland and the Township of Clifton-Partie-Est.
- 31 December:
  - Creation of the Municipality of **Ange-Gardien** by the merger of the Village of L'Ange-Gardien and the Parish of Saint-Ange-Gardien.
  - Creation of the Municipality of **Manseau** by the merger of the Village of Manseau and the Parish of Saint-Joseph-de-Blandford.
  - Creation of the Municipality of **Saint-François-du-Lac** by the merger of the Village of Saint-François-du-Lac and the Parish of Saint-François-du-Lac.
  - The Village of Kingsey Falls is annexed by the Municipality of Kingsey Falls.
  - The Parish of Saint-Jacques-le-Majeur-de-Causapscal is annexed by the City of **Causapscal**.

=== 1998 ===
Thirty-one municipality modifications were approved in 1998.

- 7 January:
  - Creation of the Municipality of **Saint-Anselme** by the merger of the Village of Saint-Anselme and the Parish of Saint-Anselme.
  - Creation of the Municipality of **Saint-Cuthbert** by the merger of the Parish of Saint-Cuthbert and the Parish of Saint-Viateur.
- 31 January:
  - The Municipality of Saint-Gabriel changed its name to **Saint-Gabriel-de-Rimouski**.
  - The Parish of Saint-Étienne-de-Beaumont became the Municipality of **Beaumont**.
- 4 February: Creation of the Municipality of **Saint-Jacques** by the merger of the Village of Saint-Jacques and the Parish of Saint-Jacques.
- 25 February:
  - The Municipality of Saint-François-de-Beauce and the Municipality of Saint-François-Ouest are annexed by the City of **Beauceville**.
  - Creation of the Municipality of **Saint-Ludger** by the merger of the Municipality of Risborough, the Village of Saint-Ludger and the Township of Gayhurst-Partie-Sud-Est.
  - Creation of the Municipality of **Upton** by the merger of the Village of Upton and the Parish of Saint-Éphrem-d'Upton.
- 14 March: The Municipality of Sainte-Marthe-du-Cap became a City.
- 28 March: The Parish of Saint-Mathieu became the Municipality of **Saint-Mathieu-du-Parc**.
- 4 April: The Parish of **Sainte-Julienne** became a Municipality.
- 28 May: Creation of the Municipality of **Rawdon** by the merger of the Village of Rawdon and the Township of Rawdon.
- 3 June: Creation of the Municipality of **Fortierville** by the merger of the Village of Fortierville and the Parish of Sainte-Philomène-de-Fortierville.
- 6 June: The Parish of Saint-Laurent became the Municipality of **Saint-Laurent-de-l'Île-d'Orléans**.
- 11 July: The Municipality of Saint-Joseph-de-Cléricy changed its name to Cléricy.
- 2 September: The Village of Baie-de-Shawinigan is annexed by the City of **Shawinigan**.
- 5 September: The Parish of Notre-Dame-de-l'Île-Perrot became a Municipality.
- 9 September: Creation of the Municipality of **Inverness** by the merger of the Village of Inverness and the Township of Inverness.
- 12 September: Sherbrooke Regional County Municipality changed its name to La Région-Sherbrookoise Regional County Municipality.
- 26 September: The Township of **La Minerve** became a Municipality.
- 10 October:
  - The Municipality of Saint-Paul-du-Nord-Sault-au-Mouton changed its name to **Longue-Rive**.
  - Division of the Unorganized Territory of Lac-des-Écorces: Annexation in part to Duhamel and of the remainder to the Municipality of Montpellier.
- 17 October: The Parish of **Saint-Roch-de-Richelieu** became a Municipality.
- 4 November: The Parish of Saint-Jean-Baptiste (Montérégie) moved from Rouville Regional County Municipality to La Vallée-du-Richelieu Regional County Municipality.
- 23 December: The Parish of Saint-Tite is annexed by the City of **Saint-Tite**.
- 26 December: The Municipality of Boucher changed its name to **Trois-Rives**.
- 30 December:
  - Creation of the Municipality of **L'Isle-aux-Allumettes** by the merger of the Village of Chapeau, the Township of L'Isle-aux-Allumettes and the Township of L'Isle-aux-Allumettes-Partie-Est.
  - The Parish of Saint-Patrice-de-la-Rivière-du-Loup is annexed by the City of **Rivière-du-Loup**.
  - The Township of Barford and the Township of Barnston are annexed by the City of **Coaticook**.
  - The Township of Brompton is annexed by the City of Bromptonville.

=== 1999 ===
Twenty-nine municipality modifications were approved in 1999.

- 1 January: The Village of Sainte-Agathe-Sud is annexed by the City of **Sainte-Agathe-des-Monts**.
- 6 January: Creation of the City of **Métabetchouan-Lac-à-la-Croix** by the merger of the City of Métabetchouan and the Municipality of Lac-à-la-Croix.
- 27 January: The Parish of Saint-Joseph-de-Beauce is annexed by the City of **Saint-Joseph-de-Beauce**.
- 3 February:.
  - Creation of the Municipality of **Sainte-Agathe-de-Lotbinière** by the merger of the Village of Sainte-Agathe and the Parish of Sainte-Agathe.
  - The Village of Philipsburg is annexed by the Municipality of **Saint-Armand**.
- 6 March: The Parish of **Saint-Zénon** became a Municipality.
- 17 March: The Municipality of Shipton is annexed by the City of **Danville**.
- 20 March: The Municipality of Saint-Nicéphore became a City.
- 3 April: The Village of Sainte-Rosalie became a City.
- 1 May: The Municipality of **Paspébiac** became a City.
- 8 May: The Municipality of **Prévost** became a City.
- 2 June: Creation of the Municipality of Cascapédia by the merger of the Municipality of Grande-Cascapédia and the Municipality of Saint-Jules.
- 17 July: Pabok Regional County Municipality changed its name to Le Rocher-Percé Regional County Municipality.
- 8 September:
  - The Municipality of Saint-Paul-de-Châteauguay is annexed by the Municipality of **Sainte-Martine**.
  - The Parish of Oka is annexed by the Municipality of **Oka**.
- 29 September: Creation of the Municipality of **Saint-Chrysostome** by the merger of the Village of Saint-Chrysostome and the Parish of Saint-Jean-Chrysostome.
- 6 October: Creation of the Municipality of Brownsburg-Chatham by the merger of the Village of Brownsburg and the Township of Chatham.
- 23 October:
  - The Indian settlement of Grand-Lac-Victoria changed its name to Kitcisakik.
  - The Indian reserve of Timiscaming changed its name to Timiskaming.
- 13 November:
  - The Municipality of Kingsey changed its name to **Saint-Félix-de-Kingsey**.
  - The Township of Langelier became the Municipality of La Croche.
- 1 December: Creation of the City of **La Malbaie** by the merger of the City of La Malbaie-Pointe-au-Pic, the Municipality of Rivière-Malbaie, the Municipality of Saint-Fidèle, the Village of Cap-à-l'Aigle and the Parish of Sainte-Agnès.
- 8 December:
  - The Municipality of Compton-Station is annexed by the Municipality of **Compton**.
  - The Municipality of Trois-Lacs is annexed by the City of Asbestos.
- 15 December:
  - The Village of Henryville is annexed by the Municipality of **Henryville**.
  - The Municipality of Ulverton moved from Drummond Regional County Municipality to Le Val-Saint-François Regional County Municipality, and therefore from the Centre-du-Québec region to the Estrie region.
- 29 December:
  - Creation of the Municipality of **Les Bergeronnes** by the merger of the Village of Grandes-Bergeronnes and the Township of Bergeronnes.
  - Creation of the Municipality of Saint-André-Carillon by the merger of the Village of Carillon, the Village of Saint-André-Est and the Parish of Saint-André-d'Argenteuil.
  - Creation of the Municipality of **Saint-Flavien** by the merger of the Village of Saint-Flavien and the Parish of Saint-Flavien.
  - The Village of Melbourne is annexed by the City of **Richmond**.
  - The Village of Saint-Grégoire-de-Greenlay is annexed by the City of **Windsor**.
- The Unorganized Territory of Lac-Cabasta is created from part of the territory of the Unorganized Territory of Lac-Bazinet, as a result of a reinterpretation of the boundary between Antoine-Labelle Regional County Municipality and Matawinie Regional County Municipality. The date of creation is deemed to be retroactive to January 1, 1986.

== See also ==
- List of municipalities in Quebec
- List of former municipalities in Quebec
