= Sébastien D'Astous =

Canadian politician

Sébastien D'Astous MNA

Member of the National Assembly for Abitibi-Ouest
- Incumbent
- Assumed office October 5, 2026
- Preceded by: Suzanne Blais

Mayor of Amos
- In office February 15, 2015 – 2026
- Preceded by: Ulrick Chérubin

Prefect of the Abitibi Regional County Municipality
- In office 2017–2026

Amos City Councillor
- In office November 1, 2009 – December 16, 2014

Personal details
- Party: Parti Québécois
- Other political affiliations: CAQ (2012); ADQ (2008)
- Education: Université Laval
- Known for: Survivor Québec 2024

Sébastien D'Astous is a Canadian politician who is the mayor of Amos, Quebec. He is a candidate for the National Assembly of Quebec for Abitibi-Ouest in the 2026 Quebec general election as a member of the Parti Québécois.

== Electoral record ==
2026 Quebec general election: Abitibi-Ouest
** Preliminary results — Not yet official **
| Party | Candidate | Votes | % | ±% |
|---|---|---|---|---|
| Parti Québécois | Sébastien D'Astous | 11,080 | 49.59 | +28.83 |
| Conservative | Daniel Guillemette | 4,045 | 18.10 | +7.79 |
| Coalition Avenir Québec | Suzanne Blais | 3,433 | 15.36 | –31.39 |
| Québec solidaire | Joanie Bolduc | 1,959 | 8.77 | –7.52 |
| Liberal | Marc-André Fortin | 1,827 | 8.18 | +3.00 |
| Total valid votes | | 22,344 | 98.40 | –0.19 |
| Total rejected ballots | | 364 | 1.60 | +0.19 |
| Turnout | | 22,708 | 64.30 | +0.60 |
| Electors on the lists | | 35,317 | | |
| Parti Québécois gain from Coalition Avenir Québec | | Swing | | +10.52 |
Source: Élections Québec

2012 Quebec general election: Abitibi-Ouest
| Party | Candidate | Votes | % |
|---|---|---|---|
| Parti Québécois | François Gendron | 12,066 | 51.36 |
| Coalition Avenir Québec | Sébastien D'Astous | 4,579 | 20.26 |
| Liberal | Claude Nelson Morin | 4,399 | 18.73 |
| Québec solidaire | Ghislaine Camirand | 1,260 | 5.36 |
| Option nationale | Grégory Vézeau | 1,007 | 4.29 |

2008 Quebec general election: Abitibi-Ouest
| Party | Candidate | Votes | % |
|---|---|---|---|
| Parti Québécois | François Gendron | 10,597 | 57.32 |
| Liberal | Claude Nelson Morin | 5,317 | 28.76 |
| Action démocratique | Sébastien D'Astous | 2,198 | 11.89 |
| Parti indépendantiste | Grégory Vézeau | 375 | 2.03 |
