= Des Aulnes River =

Des Aulnes
- Nottaway River basin in yellow

Location
- Country: Canada
- Province: Quebec
- Region: Abitibi-Témiscamingue

Physical characteristics
- Source: Creeks of marsh
  - location: Barraute, Abitibi-Témiscamingue, Quebec
  - coordinates: 48°26′42″N 77°42′48″W
  - elevation: 337 m (1,106 ft)
- Mouth: Laflamme River
  - location: Barraute, Abitibi-Témiscamingue, Quebec
  - coordinates: 48°25′28″N 77°38′12″W
  - elevation: 303 m (994 ft)
- Length: 7.9 km (4.9 mi)

Basin features
- Tributaries
  - left: (from the mouth) Marcotte creek, Rioux creek.
  - right: Picard creek.

The Des Aulnes River (English: Alders River) is a tributary of the west bank of the Laflamme river, flowing in the municipality of Barraute, in the regional county municipality (MRC) of Abitibi, in the administrative region of Abitibi-Témiscamingue, Quebec, Canada. His course is entirely in Barraute Township.

The "Des Aulnes River" flows in forest and agricultural areas. Forestry is the main economic activity of this hydrographic slope; agriculture, second.

Although safe ice circulation is typically from mid-December to late March, the river's surface is typically frozen from mid-November to mid-April.

== Geography ==
The hydrographic slopes adjacent to the "Des Aulnes River" are:

- North side: Laflamme River, Fisher Creek;
- East side: Laflamme River, Frenette Creek, Castor Creek;
- South side: Barraute Creek, Lafrance Stream, Laflamme River, Fiedmont Lake, Fiedmont River;
- West side: Landrienne River, Angers Brook, La Motte Lake, Harricana River.

The "Des Aulnes River" has its source of streams draining a marsh area (altitude: 337 metres (1,106 ft)), located in Barraute Township. This wetland constitutes the plateau of several hydrographic slopes, including that of Fischer Creek (tributary of the Laflamme River on the north side) and of Barraute Creek (tributary of the Laflamme River on the south side).

This source of the "Des Aulnes River" is located at:

- 5.7 kilometres (3.5 mi) west of the railway bridge over the Laflamme River to the village of Barraute, Quebec;
- 5.7 kilometres (3.5 mi) Northwest of the mouth of the "Des Aulnes River";
- 22.7 kilometres (14.1 mi) Northeast of Lake La Motte;
- 7.3 kilometres (4.5 mi) Northwest of Fiedmont Lake.

From its source, the course of the "Des Aulnes River" flows over 7.9 kilometres (4.9 mi) according to the following segments:

- 3.6 kilometres (2.2 mi) Southeast, crossing a marsh zone at the beginning of the segment, up to the Picard stream (coming from the South);
- 0.8 kilometres (0.50 mi) Northeast, in agricultural zone, to Marcotte Creek (coming from the North);
- 3.5 kilometres (2.2 mi) to the Southeast in a mainly forest and agricultural zone, passing south of the village of Barraute, Quebec, to its confluence.

The "Des Aulnes River" empties on the west bank of the Laflamme River at:

- 3.6 kilometres (2.2 mi) North of the mouth of Fiedmont Lake;
- 30.9 kilometres (19.2 mi) Northeast of Malartic Lake;
- 1.6 kilometres (0.99 mi) South of the village center of Barraute;
- 29.9 kilometres (18.6 mi) West of the railway bridge over the Bell River to Senneterre, Quebec;
- 103.5 kilometres (64.3 mi) South of the mouth of the Laflamme River (confluence with the Bell River).

== Toponymy ==
The toponym "Des Aulnes River" was formalized on November 5, 1981 at the Commission de toponymie du Québec.

== See also ==
- James Bay
- Rupert Bay
- Nottaway River
- Lake Matagami
- Bell River
- Laflamme River
- Abitibi, a regional county municipality (MRC)
- Barraute, Quebec, a municipality
- List of rivers of Quebec
