= Saint-Félix-de-Dalquier =

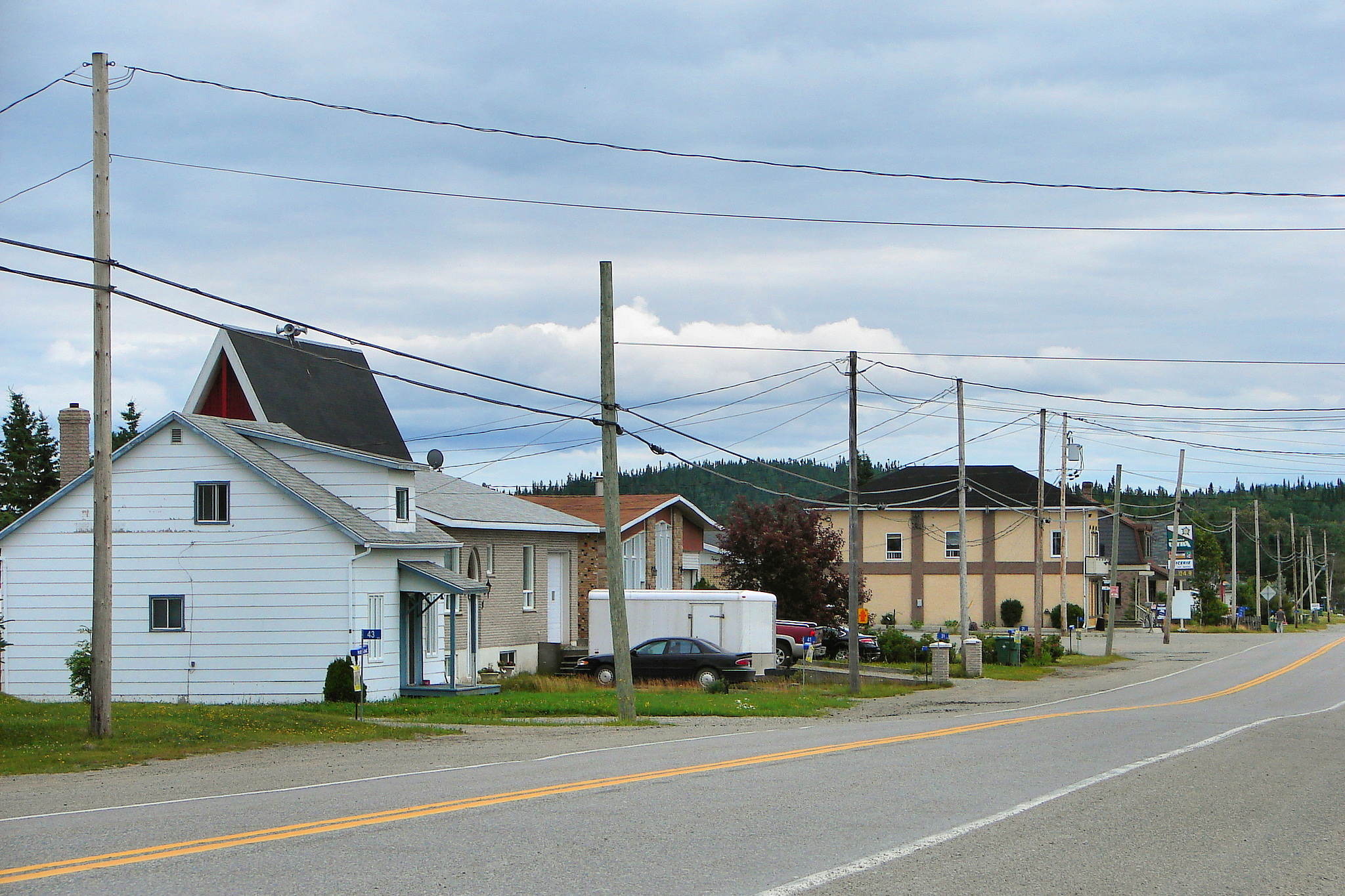

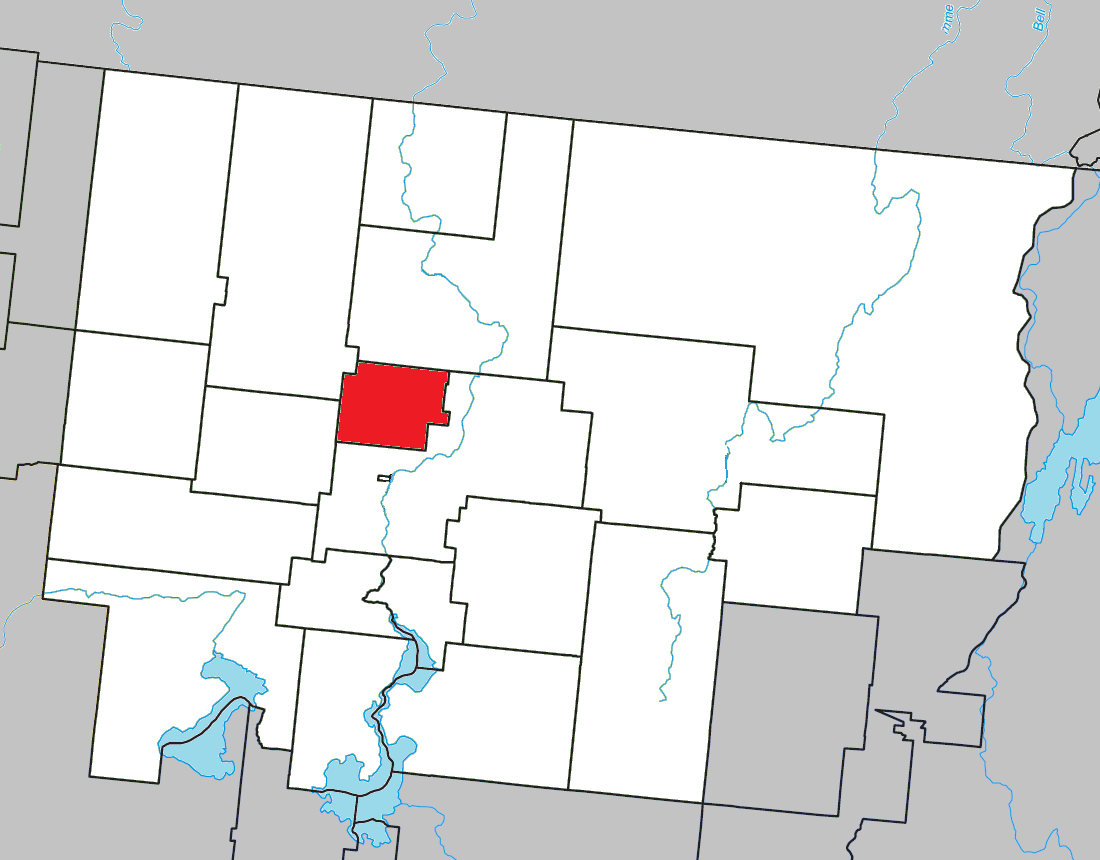
- Location within Abitibi RCM

- Location in western Quebec
- Coordinates: 48°41′N 78°07′W
- Country: Canada
- Province: Quebec
- Region: Abitibi-Témiscamingue
- RCM: Abitibi
- Settled: 1921
- Constituted: October 29, 1932

Government
  - Mayor: Félix Labrecque
  - Federal riding: Abitibi—Témiscamingue
  - Prov. riding: Abitibi-Ouest

Area
  - Total: 113.83 km^{2} (43.95 sq mi)
  - Land: 113.15 km^{2} (43.69 sq mi)

Population (2021)
  - Total: 1,026
  - Density: 9.1/km^{2} (24/sq mi)
  - Pop (2016-21): ▲9.1%
  - Dwellings: 414
- Time zone: UTC−05:00 (EST)
  - Summer (DST): UTC−04:00 (EDT)
- Postal code(s): J0Y 1G0
- Area code: 819
- Highways: R-109
- Website: www.stfelixdedalquier.ca

Saint-Félix-de-Dalquier (French pronunciation: [sɛ̃ feliks də dalkje]) is a former municipality in the Canadian province of Quebec, located in the Abitibi Regional County Municipality. Since 2025, it was merged with the city of Amos.

== Demographics ==
Historical census populations – Saint-Félix-de-Dalquier

Year	Pop.	±%
1941	836	—
1951	776	−7.2%
1956	814	+4.9%
1961	803	−1.4%
1966	835	+4.0%
1971	783	−6.2%
1976	809	+3.3%
1981	927	+14.6%

Year	Pop.	±%
1986	949	+2.4%
1991	959	+1.1%
1996	978	+2.0%
2001	938	−4.1%
2006	936	−0.2%
2011	856	−8.5%
2016	940	+9.8%
2021	1,026	+9.1%

Source: Statistics Canada

Private dwellings occupied by usual residents (2021): 405 (total dwellings: 414)

Mother tongue (2021):

- English as first language: 1.0%
- French as first language: 97.6%
- English and French as first language: 1.0%
- Other as first language: 0.5%

== Government ==
Municipal council (as of 2024):

- Mayor: Félix Labrecque
- Councillors: Katy Grenier, Anthony Macmillan-Labrecque, Martin Gauthier, Jonathan Gauthier-Cossette, Lise Nadeau, Julie Lamerise
