= La Motte, Quebec =

La Motte
- Municipality
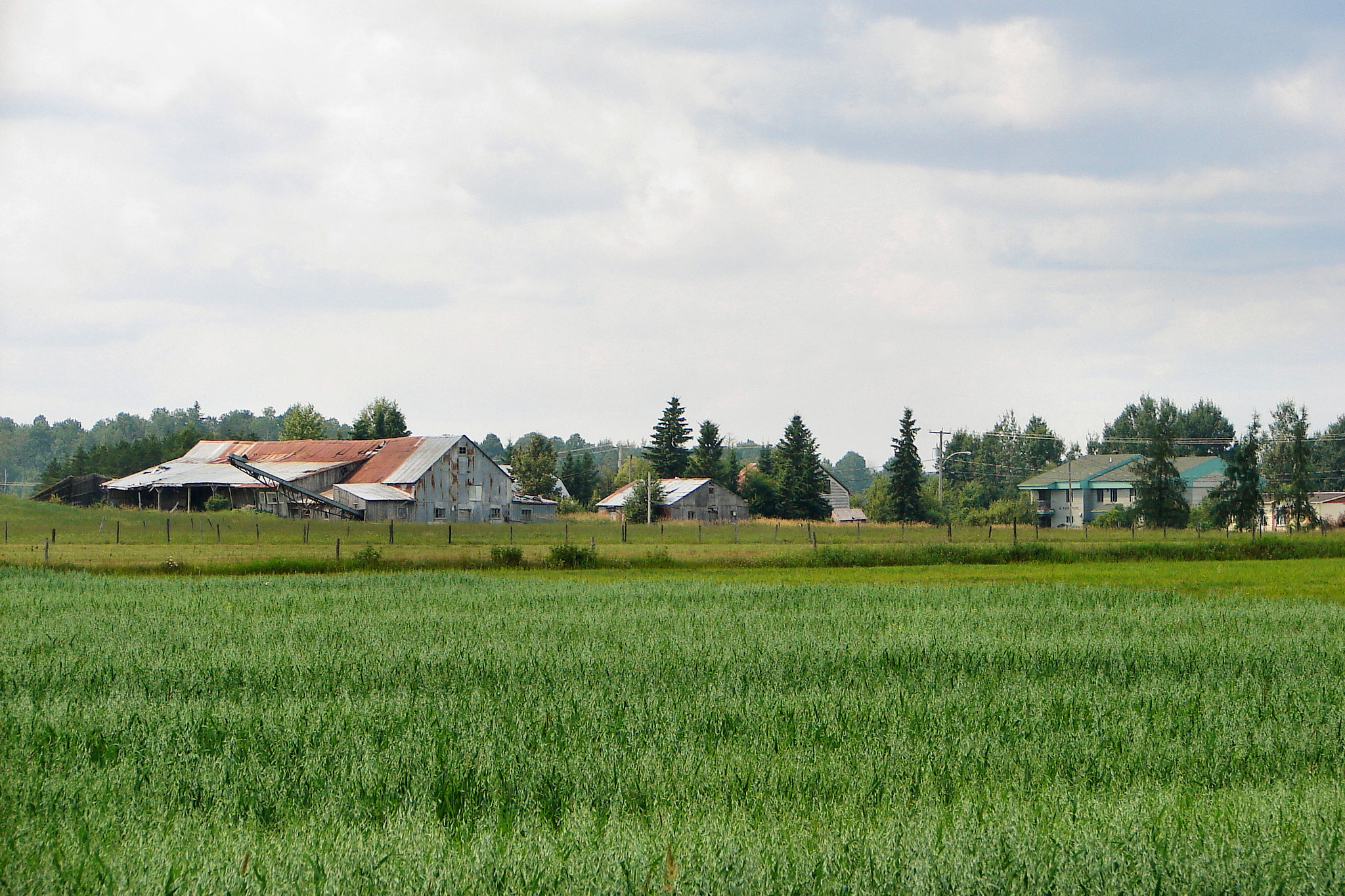

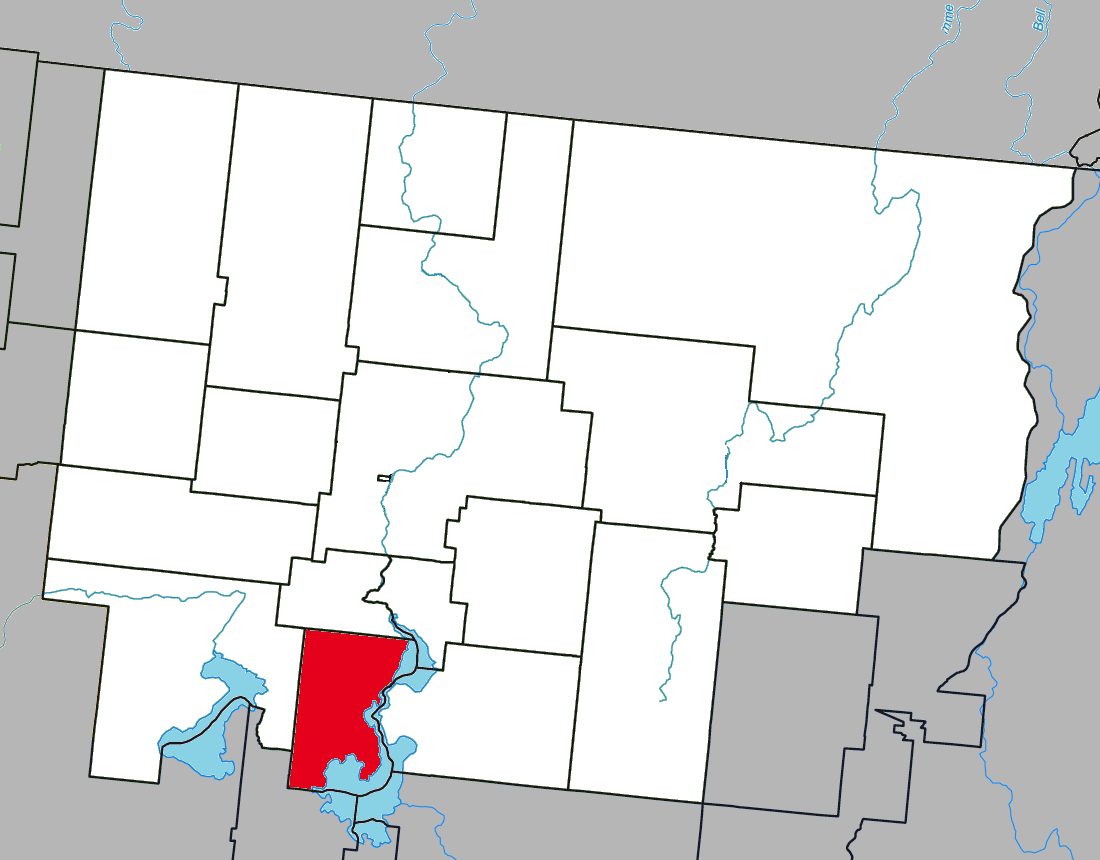
- Location within Abitibi RCM

- Location in western Quebec
- Coordinates: 48°20′N 78°07′W
- Country: Canada
- Province: Quebec
- Region: Abitibi-Témiscamingue
- RCM: Abitibi
- Settled: 1910s
- Constituted: May 30, 1921

Government
  - Mayor: Réjean Richard
  - Federal riding: Abitibi—Témiscamingue
  - Prov. riding: Abitibi-Ouest

Area
  - Total: 216.05 km^{2} (83.42 sq mi)
  - Land: 175.48 km^{2} (67.75 sq mi)

Population (2021)
  - Total: 478
  - Density: 2.7/km^{2} (7.0/sq mi)
  - Pop (2016-21): ▲5.5%
  - Dwellings: 264
- Time zone: UTC−5 (EST)
  - Summer (DST): UTC−4 (EDT)
- Postal code(s): J0Y 1T0
- Area code: 819
- Highways: R-109
- Website: www.municipalitedelamotte.ca

La Motte (French pronunciation: [la mɔt]) is a municipality in the Canadian province of Quebec, located in the Abitibi Regional County Municipality and the administrative region of Abitibi-Témiscamingue.

In the Abitibi area the village of "La Motte" has four namesakes: La Motte Township, the municipality of La Motte, La Motte lake (formed by a widening of the Harricana River) and the Bay of La Motte (located on the lake in the town of Malartic La Motte). The name of the municipality was chosen in honor of Guillaume-Jérôme Vacquier de Lamothe, a French army officer who served under Louis-Joseph de Montcalm; he had been a captain in the regiment of Béarn in Montcalm's army.

As of 2013, the town did not have a restaurant or inn. In preparation for the potential media influx due to the papability of Cardinal Ouellet after the resignation of pope Benedict XVI, an old church basement had been converted into a media centre.

== Geography ==
The village of La Motte is located midway between the city of Amos (distance of 27.5 km) and city of Malartic (distance of 30.5 km). The Provincial road 109 crosses the municipal territory north to south. The village of La Motte is located 80.7 km from the city of Rouyn-Noranda and 57.2 km from Val d'Or. The Harricana River which is the eastern boundary of the municipal territory includes at the height of La Motte two bulges forming large lakes in the area: the Lake Malartic southeast and the lake La Motte at northeast. Access to the village of La Motte is by Highway 117 connecting Val d'Or and Rouyn-Noranda, or by the road 111 linking Val d'Or to Amos.

The municipal area of La Motte straddles the watershed between the basin of the James Bay (Eastern part of the territory of La Motte) and watershed Saint Lawrence River (western). In the early 19th century, colonization of the territory gained strength thanks to the arrival of the Transcontinental railway in Amos in 1913, linking Abitibi to Quebec city. The railway, which passes through Hervey-Jonction (Middle Mauricie), La Tuque (Haute-Mauricie) and Senneterre (Abitibi) generated a considerable influx of settlers across the North West Quebec.

== Demographics ==
Historical census populations – La Motte, Quebec

Year	Pop.	±%
1931	336	—
1941	690	+105.4%
1951	626	−9.3%
1956	680	+8.6%
1961	664	−2.4%
1966	663	−0.2%

Year	Pop.	±%
1971	501	−24.4%
1976	433	−13.6%
1981	430	−0.7%
1986	429	−0.2%
1991	415	−3.3%
1996	409	−1.4%

Year	Pop.	±%
2001	406	−0.7%
2006	395	−2.7%
2011	457	+15.7%
2016	453	−0.9%
2021	478	+5.5%

Source: Statistics Canada

Private dwellings occupied by usual residents (2021): 222 (total dwellings: 264)

Mother tongue (2021):

- English as first language: 0%
- French as first language: 96.9%
- English and French as first language: 1%
- Other as first language: 0%

== Attractions ==
Inaugurated on June 2, 2011, the community center of La Motte was built within the walls of the old church of Saint-Luc (built in 1937). Purchased for $1 by the municipality in 2005, the building which was renovated at the level of $260,000 includes a multipurpose room (Heritage room with a stage for public shows) formed in the nave (ground floor) for public events with 300-seat and Pioneers room in the basement with 150 seats, with a well equipped kitchen. These rooms are used for publics meetings, presentations, exhibitions, weddings, entertainment ... The choir retains its authenticity especially the religious celebration of baptisms, funerals, masses, weddings and other important religious events. A grid and a retractable curtain separates the nave of this section for worship. Calendar of events in community center is available on the official website of the municipality.

Windows and woodwork of the old church have been carefully restored. The former sacristy was subdivided with a section dedicated to the needs of the factory of the Saint-Luc parish. A nonprofit committee manages this Community Centre. Over 3,000 volunteer hours were devoted to the restoration of the building for its new multi-functional vocation. This restoration is a model of integration of religious heritage in order to respond to community needs.

== Government ==
La Motte forms part of the federal electoral district of Abitibi—Témiscamingue and has been represented by Sébastien Lemire of the Bloc Québécois since 2019. Provincially, La Motte is part of the Abitibi-Ouest electoral district and is represented by Suzanne Blais of the Coalition Avenir Québec since 2018.

La Motte federal election results
Year	Liberal		Conservative		Bloc Québécois		New Democratic		Green	
2021	21%	49	16%	37	50%	120	5%	13	1%	3
2019	20%	47	16%	37	52%	120	7%	17	5%	11

La Motte provincial election results
Year	CAQ		Liberal		QC solidaire		Parti Québécois	
2018	32%	78	10%	24	16%	38	35%	86
2014	11%	26	28%	68	7%	17	50%	120

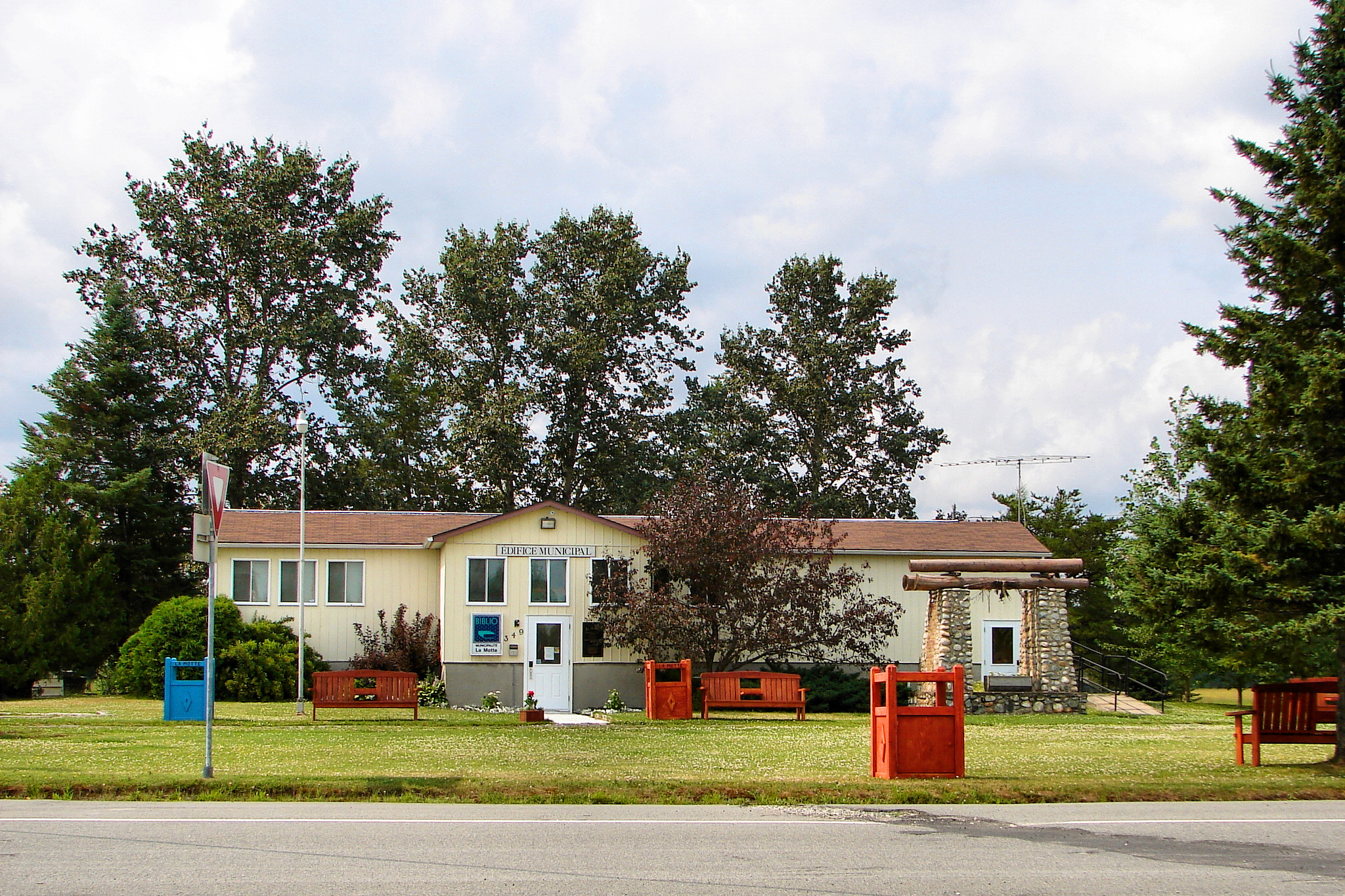
La Motte municipal office

Municipal council (as of 2023):

- Mayor: Réjean Richard
- Councillors: Luc St-Pierre, Louis Baribeau, Ghislaine Baribeau, Patrick Cyr, Pierre Bouchard, Pascal Bellefeuille

List of former mayors:

- F.X. Dorval (1921–1922)
- Jean Simard (1922–1923)
- Ernest Tremblay (1923)
- Raoul Bourgeois (1923–1925)
- J.A. Tremblay (1925–1926)
- Alfred Dorval (1926–1929)
- Gaudiase Bélanger (1929–1933)
- Philias Noël (1933–1937)
- Émile Ross (1937–1945)
- Joseph Larouche Fils (1945–1946)
- Georges Michaud (1946–1947)
- J.O.R. Rochon (1947–1951, 1955–1957, 1961–1985)
- Edgar Perron (1951–1955)
- Georges Sévigny (1957–1961)
- Pierre Ouellet (1985–1988)
- Michel Larouche (1988–1989)
- Michel Savard (1989–1997)
- René Martineau (1997–2017)
- Louis-Joseph Fecteau-Lefebvre (2017–2018)
- Réjean Richard (2018–present)

== Notable people ==
- Cardinal Marc Ouellet of the Roman Catholic Church was born in La Motte on June 8, 1944.
