= Launay, Quebec =

Launay
- Township municipality
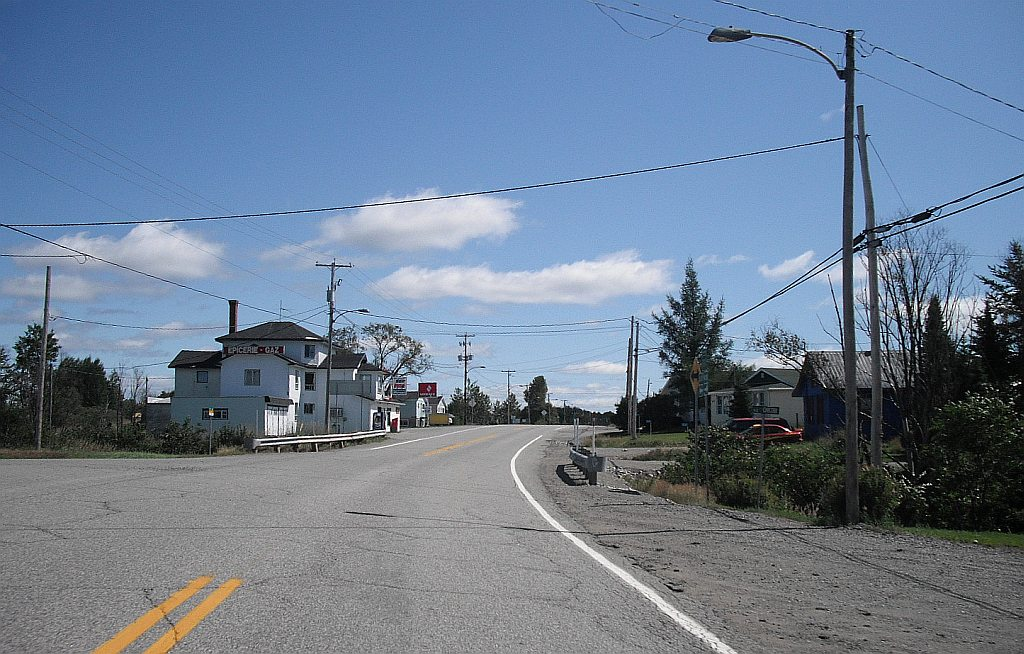

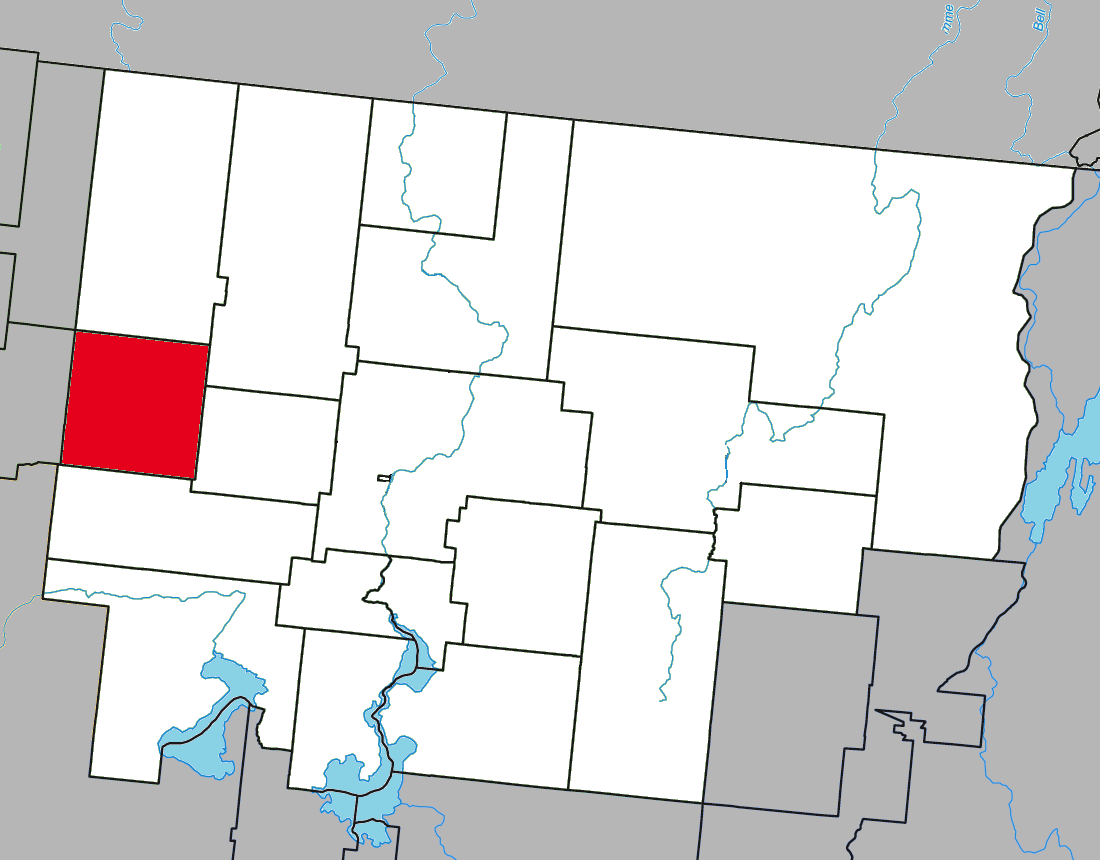
- Location within Abitibi RCM

- Location in western Quebec
- Coordinates: 48°39′N 78°32′W
- Country: Canada
- Province: Quebec
- Region: Abitibi-Témiscamingue
- RCM: Abitibi
- Settled: c. 1917
- Constituted: May 18, 1921
- Named for: Jean-Baptiste Leporquier de Launay

Government
  - Mayor: Claudette Laroche
  - Federal riding: Abitibi—Témiscamingue
  - Prov. riding: Abitibi-Ouest

Area
  - Total: 259.22 km^{2} (100.09 sq mi)
  - Land: 257.80 km^{2} (99.54 sq mi)

Population (2021)
  - Total: 211
  - Density: 0.8/km^{2} (2.1/sq mi)
  - Pop (2016-21): ▼3.2%
  - Dwellings: 99
- Time zone: UTC−5 (EST)
  - Summer (DST): UTC−4 (EDT)
- Postal code(s): J0Y 1W0
- Area code: 819
- Highways: R-111
- Website: www.launay.ca

Launay (French pronunciation: [lonɛ]) is a township municipality in the Canadian province of Quebec, located in the Abitibi Regional County Municipality.

The municipality is named after Jean-Baptiste Leporquier de Launay, a military commander and captain of the Guyenne Regiment from the mid-18th century.

Its economy is dependent on agriculture and forestry.

== History ==
The town's origin began with the construction of the railway station along the National Transcontinental Railway in 1913. In 1916, the geographic township was established, and settlement began the following year. On May 18, 1921, the Township Municipality of Launay was created out of unincorporated territory. Its first school was built in 1922, and its post office opened the following year (which closed in 1956).

In 1947, Launay was connected to the electrical grid, and in 1961, to the telephone system. In 1971, the Canadian National railway company closed Launay Station, which was demolished in 1988. That same year, the municipal sewer network was installed.

== Demographics ==
In the 2021 Census of Population conducted by Statistics Canada, Launay had a population of 211 living in 97 of its 99 total private dwellings, a change of −3.2% from its 2016 population of 218. With a land area of 257.8 km^{2} (99.5 sq mi), it had a population density of 0.8/km^{2} (2.1/sq mi) in 2021.

Canada census – Launay, Quebec community profile

	2021	2016	2011
Population	211 (-3.2% from 2016)	218 (-4.8% from 2011)	229 (+1.3% from 2006)
Land area	257.8 km^{2} (99.5 sq mi)	258.51 km^{2} (99.81 sq mi)	258.24 km^{2} (99.71 sq mi)
Population density	0.8/km^{2} (2.1/sq mi)	0.8/km^{2} (2.1/sq mi)	0.9/km^{2} (2.3/sq mi)
Median age	49.2 (M: 54, F: 44.4)	50 (M: 53, F: 47)	47.1 (M: 47.2, F: 46.8)
Private dwellings	99 (total) 97 (occupied)	118 (total) 100 (occupied)	97 (total) 96 (occupied)
Median household income	$.n/a	$.n/a	$.n/a

References: 2021 2016 2011

Mother tongue (2021):

- English as first language: 0%
- French as first language: 100%
- English and French as first language: 0%
- Other as first language: 0%

Historical census populations – Launay, Quebec

Year	Pop.	±%
1921	121	—
1931	409	+238.0%
1941	423	+3.4%
1951	413	−2.4%
1956	508	+23.0%
1961	470	−7.5%

Year	Pop.	±%
1966	466	−0.9%
1971	475	+1.9%
1976	395	−16.8%
1981	369	−6.6%
1986	335	−9.2%
1991	272	−18.8%

Year	Pop.	±%
1996	260	−4.4%
2001	259	−0.4%
2006	226	−12.7%
2011	229	+1.3%
2016	218	−4.8%
2021	211	−3.2%

Source: Statistics Canada

== Government ==
=== Local government ===
Municipal council (as of 2023):

- Mayor: Claudette Laroche
- Councillors: Clermont Bossé, Jimmy Samson, Rémi Gilbert, Laurier Fortin, Denyse Lacombe-Audy, Marie-Anne Fortin

List of former mayors:

- Moïse Viens (1921–1924)
- Évariste Lefebvre (1924–1926, 1935–1937)
- Cyrille Larochelle (1926–1931)
- Ben Campbell (1931–1935)
- Adélard Thibeault (1937–1940)
- Joseph Gagnon (1940–1943)
- Cajetan Bourassa (1943, 1947–1949)
- Joseph Rochefort (1943–1947)
- Émile Thibeault (1949–1953)
- Rolland Ménard (1953–1957)
- Aimé Bilodeau (1957–1961)
- Arthur Laroche (1961–1969)
- Joseph Brochu (1969–1971)
- Vallier Thibeault (1971–1972)
- Euclide Ménard (1972–1976)
- Marcel Ébacher (1976–1983)
- Ozanam Paré (1983–1987, 1991–2005)
- Camil Trépanier (1987–1991)
- Rosaire Thibeault (2005–2006)
- Gilles Labbé (2006–2009)
- Rémi Gilbert (2009–2017)
- Claude Lamoureux (2017–2021)
- Claudette Laroche (2021–present)

=== Political representation ===
Launay federal election results
Year	Liberal		Conservative		Bloc Québécois		New Democratic		Green	
2021	17%	19	7%	8	58%	64	5%	6	5%	5
2019	22%	25	16%	18	51%	59	8%	9	3%	4
2015	30%	28	5%	5	18%	17	43%	40	1%	1
2011	2%	2	13%	14	36%	40	50%	56	0%	0
2008	18%	16	19%	17	46%	41	13%	12	4%	4
2006	12%	13	31%	35	52%	59	4%	4	2%	2
2004	24%	26	10%	11	59%	64	4%	4	3%	3

Launay provincial election results
Year	CAQ		Liberal		QC solidaire		Parti Québécois	
2022	51%	53	6	6	13%	13	25%	26
2018	20%	29	14%	20	23%	34	39%	56
2014	9%	12	30%	37	13%	16	45%	55
2012	16%	18	16%	18	5%	6	61%	69

Federally, Launay is part of the federal riding of Abitibi—Témiscamingue. In the 2025 Canadian federal election, the incumbent Sébastien Lemire of the Bloc Québécois was re-elected to represent the population Launay in the House of Commons of Canada.

Provincially it is part of the riding of Abitibi-Ouest. In the 2022 Quebec general election the incumbent MNA Suzanne Blais, of the Coalition Avenir Québec, was re-elected to represent the population of Launay in the National Assembly of Quebec.
