= Normétal =

- Municipality
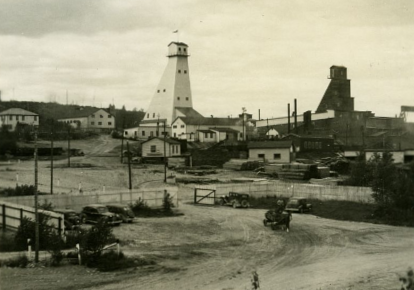

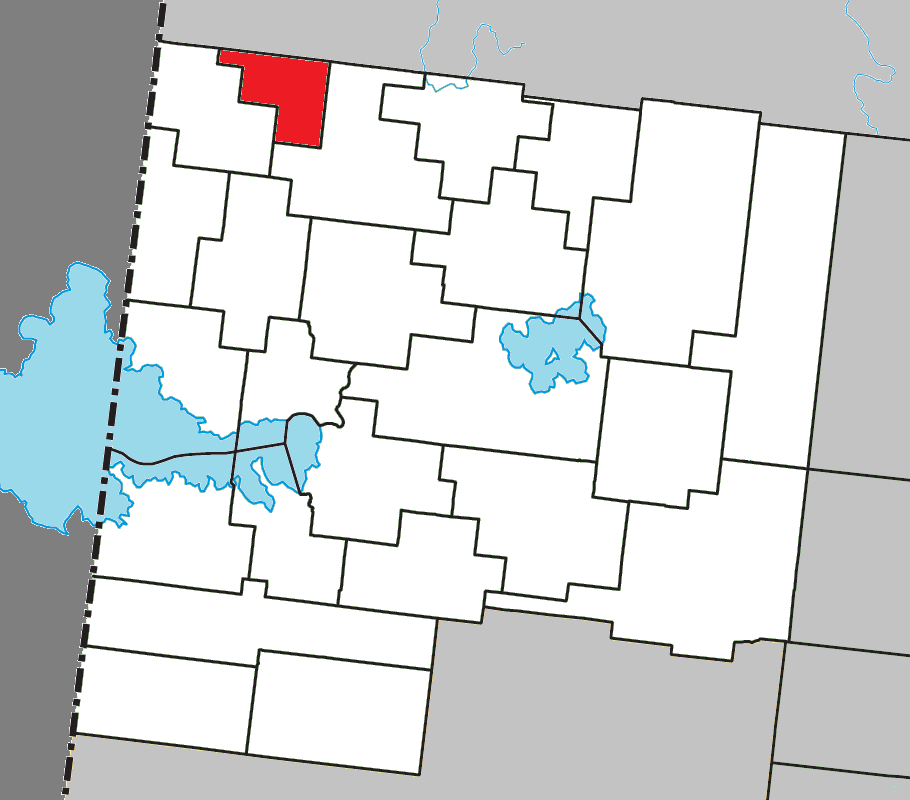
- Location within Abitibi-Ouest RCM

- Location in western Quebec
- Coordinates: 49°00′N 79°22′W
- Country: Canada
- Province: Quebec
- Region: Abitibi-Témiscamingue
- RCM: Abitibi-Ouest
- Settled: 1925
- Constituted: January 1, 1945

Government
  - Mayor: Ghislain Desbiens
  - Fed. riding: Abitibi—Témiscamingue
  - Prov. riding: Abitibi-Ouest

Area
  - Total: 55.41 km^{2} (21.39 sq mi)
  - Land: 55.25 km^{2} (21.33 sq mi)

Population (2021)
  - Total: 778
  - Density: 14.1/km^{2} (37/sq mi)
  - Pop (2016-21): ▼3.7%
  - Dwellings: 378
- Time zone: UTC−5 (EST)
  - Summer (DST): UTC−4 (EDT)
- Postal code(s): J0Z 3A0
- Area code: 819
- Highways: R-111
- Website: normetal.ao.ca

Normétal (French pronunciation: [nɔʁmetal]) is a municipality in northwestern Quebec, Canada, in the Abitibi-Ouest Regional County Municipality. It had a population of 778 in the 2021 Canadian census.

== History ==
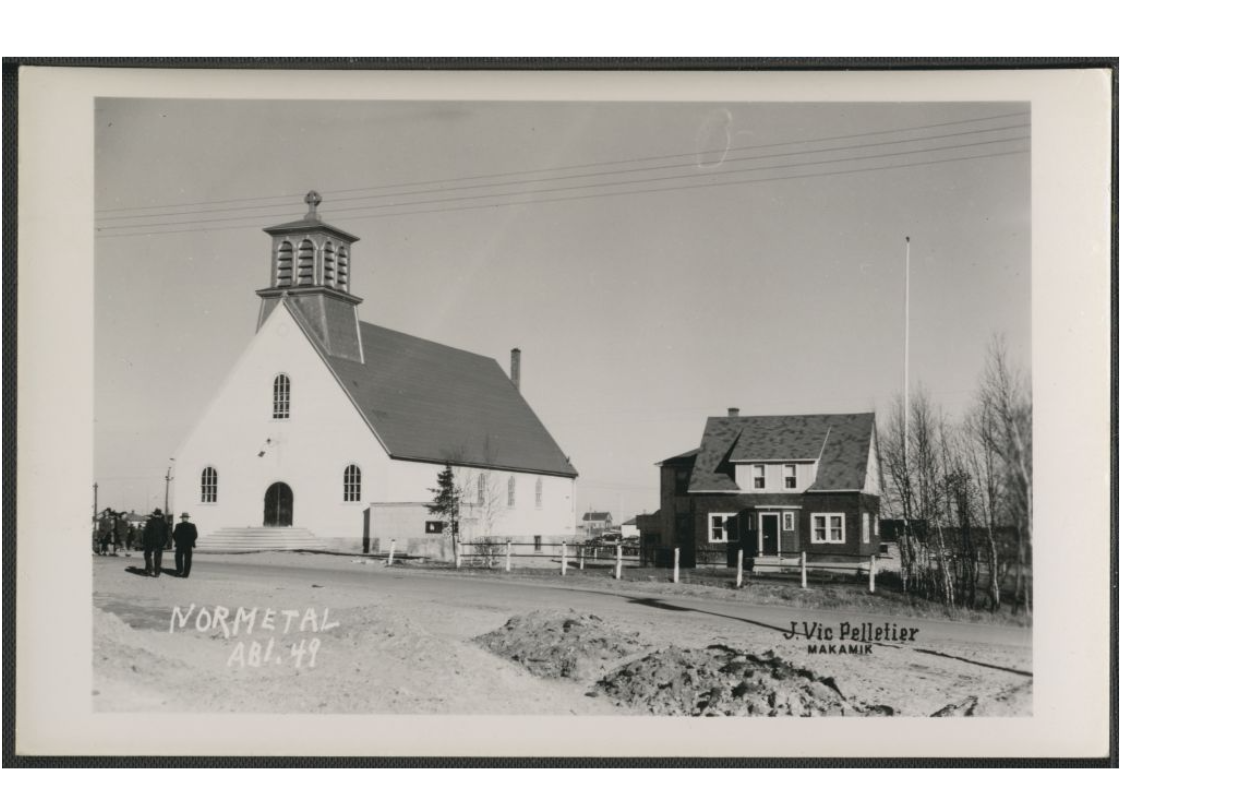
Normétal, 1949

In 1923, zinc and copper was discovered near the Calamité River and two years later, the Abana Mine Company obtained the mining rights. The new settlement, formed by families from Saint-Eustache, Portneuf, Bellechasse and the Mauricie, was therefore first called Abana. In 1931, the Normetal Mining Corporation acquired the mine and brought it to full operation six years later. In 1939, the railway and road to Dupuy was completed. In 1945, the place was incorporated, taking the name of the mining corporation whose name in turn is a portmanteau for "northern" and "metal".

In 1949, street lighting was installed in Normétal. In 1950, the mining corporation came under control of Noranda (which became Falconbridge Ltd. and bought by Xstrata in 2006). In 1956, the mine had a peak production of 900 tons of ore per day and employed over 600 persons. In 1961, the town reached a population of 2519, its largest number of residents. But in 1975, after reaching a depth of 8,000 feet (2,400 m), the copper mine closed, resulting in a large exodus of people from the community with many going to the mines of Matagami and Joutel that had just opened. By the following year, the population had dropped to 1455.

The Normetmar Mine closed in 1990. In 2005, work began on rehabilitation of the mine site by removing the tailings and planting vegetation.

== Demographics ==
=== Population ===
Canada census – Normétal, Quebec community profile

	2021	2016	2011
Population	778 (-3.7% from 2016)	808 (-5.6% from 2011)	856 (-3.4% from 2006)
Land area	55.25 km^{2} (21.33 sq mi)	55.68 km^{2} (21.50 sq mi)	57.30 km^{2} (22.12 sq mi)
Population density	14.1/km^{2} (37/sq mi)	14.5/km^{2} (38/sq mi)	14.9/km^{2} (39/sq mi)
Median age	46.4 (M: 45.2, F: 46.8)	47.0 (M: 46.0, F: 48.4)	45.6 (M: 45.5, F: 45.8)
Private dwellings	378 (total)	415 (total)	397 (total)
Median household income	$56,000	$39,424	$29,265

References: 2021 2016 2011

Historical Census Data - Normétal, Quebec

Year	Pop.	±%
1951	1,700	—
1956	2,044	+20.2%
1961	2,519	+23.2%
1966	2,312	−8.2%
1971	2,105	−9.0%
1976	1,524	−27.6%
1981	1,393	−8.6%
1986	1,239	−11.1%

Year	Pop.	±%
1991	1,193	−3.7%
1996	1,129	−5.4%
2001	1,019	−9.7%
2006	886	−13.1%
2011	856	−3.4%
2016	808	−5.6%
2021	778	−3.7%

Source: Statistics Canada

=== Language ===
Canada Census Mother Tongue - Normétal, Quebec
Census	Total	French			English			French & English			Other		
Year	Responses	Count	Trend	Pop %	Count	Trend	Pop %	Count	Trend	Pop %	Count	Trend	Pop %
2021	780	745	▼5.7%	95.5%	5	0.0%	0.6%	15	▲200.0%%	1.9%	5	▲ n/a%	0.6%
2016	810	790	▼7.1%	97.5%	5	0.0%	0.6%	5	▲ n/a%	0.6%	0	0.0%	0.0%
2011	855	850	▼1.2%	99.4%	5	▼50.0%	0.6%	0	0.0%	0.0%	0	▼100.0%	0.0%
2006	885	860	▼13.1%	97.2%	10	▲ n/a%	1.1%	0	0.0%	0.0%	15	▼40.0%	1.7%
2001	1,015	990	▼12.4%	97.5%	0	▼100.0%	0.0%	0	0.0%	0.0%	25	▲ n/a%	2.5%
1996	1,140	1,130	n/a	97.1%	10	n/a	0.9%	0	n/a	0.0%	0	n/a	0.0%

== Arts and culture ==
The town of Normétal is the setting of an award-winning movie, The Legacy from filmmaker Bernard Émond (2009), in which a family medicine physician from Montreal takes over the practice of an aging physician in need of respite.

== Government ==
Municipal council (2023):

- Interim Mayor: Ghislain Desbiens
- Councillors: Nestor Dubé, Patrice Morin, Monique Bouchard, Steve Lamoureux, Lise Bégin

=== List of mayors ===
The former mayors of Normétal were:

- Albert Lafond 1945–47
- Georges Barré 1947–55
- Roméo Morin 1955–56
- Lucien Trottier 1956–61
- Lionel Mayer 1961–63
- Samuel Petitclerc 1963–65, 1975–76
- Régis Comeau 1965–68
- Philippe Doire 1968–75
- Réal Gamache 1976–81
- Maurice Moisan 1981
- André Rivest 1981
- Normand Beaupré 1981–2005
- Daniel Therrien 2005–2007
- Jean Bergeron 2007–2010
- Louise Quesnel 2010–2012
- Rachel Bureau 2012–2013
- Jacques Dickey 2013–2017
- Roger Lévesque 2017–2022
- Ghislain Desbiens (interim) 2022–present

== See also ==
- List of municipalities in Quebec
