= Chazel =

- Municipality
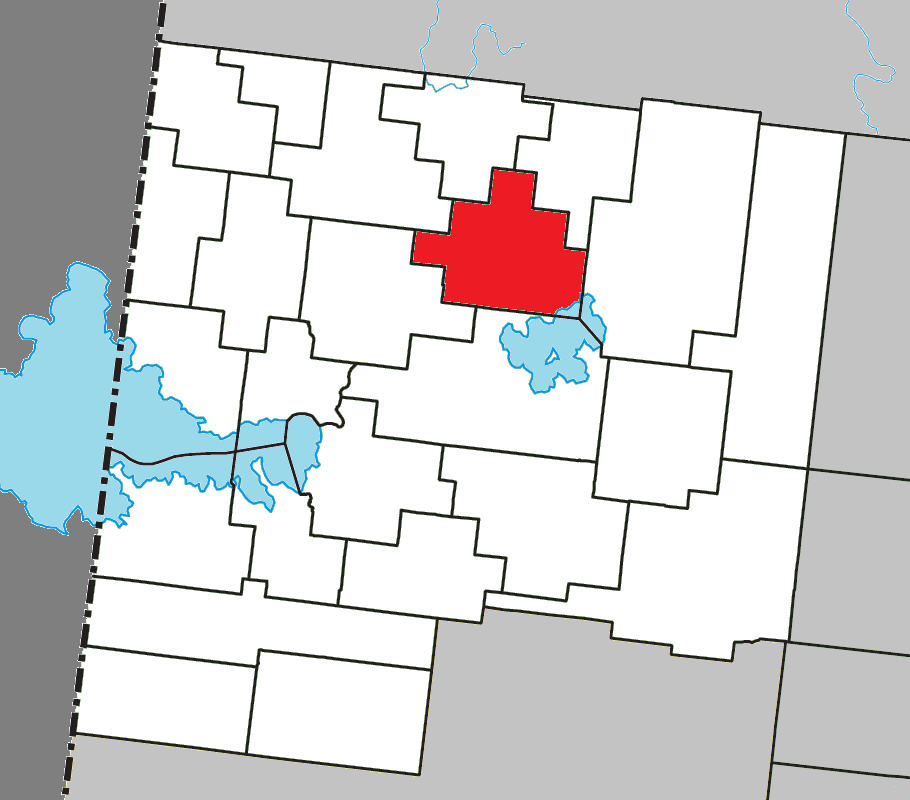
- Location within Abitibi-Ouest RCM

- Location in western Quebec
- Coordinates: 48°52′N 79°03′W
- Country: Canada
- Province: Quebec
- Region: Abitibi-Témiscamingue
- RCM: Abitibi-Ouest
- Settled: 1917
- Constituted: February 19, 1938

Government
  - Mayor: Daniel Favreau
  - Federal riding: Abitibi—Témiscamingue
  - Prov. riding: Abitibi-Ouest

Area
  - Total: 140.14 km^{2} (54.11 sq mi)
  - Land: 133.55 km^{2} (51.56 sq mi)

Population (2021)
  - Total: 254
  - Density: 1.9/km^{2} (4.9/sq mi)
  - Pop 2016-2021: ▼12.1%
  - Dwellings: 131
- Time zone: UTC−05:00 (EST)
  - Summer (DST): UTC−04:00 (EDT)
- Postal code(s): J0Z 1N0
- Area code: 819
- Highways: No major routes
- Website: chazel.ao.ca

Chazel (French pronunciation: [ʃazɛl]) is a municipality in northwestern Quebec, Canada, in the Abitibi-Ouest Regional County Municipality. It had a population of 254 in the 2021 Canadian census.

The municipality was incorporated on February 19, 1938, as the Municipality of Saint-Janvier, and commonly known as Saint-Janvier-de-Chazel. In 1991, it was renamed to Chazel, named after Guillaume Chazel, a French soldier who died in 1725 near Cape Breton.

== History ==
The municipality was founded in 1938 under the name of Saint-Janvier. In 1991, Saint-Janvier changed its name to the current Chazel.

== Geography ==
The municipality is located to the north-east of La Sarre, between Val-Saint-Gilles to the north and Macamic to the south.

== Demographics ==
=== Population ===
Canada census – Chazel community profile

	2021	2016	2011
Population	254 (-12.1% from 2016)	289 (-0.0% from 2011)	289 (-10.0% from 2006)
Land area	133.55 km^{2} (51.56 sq mi)	133.96 km^{2} (51.72 sq mi)	134.30 km^{2} (51.85 sq mi)
Population density	1.9/km^{2} (4.9/sq mi)	2.2/km^{2} (5.7/sq mi)	2.2/km^{2} (5.7/sq mi)
Median age	45.6 (M: 49.6, F: 43.6)	45.3 (M: 45.2, F: 45.5)	44.4 (M: 45.0, F: 44.2)
Private dwellings	131 (total) 118 (occupied)	132 (total)	125 (total)
Median household income	$73,500	$65,280	$56,800

References: 2021 2016 2011

Historical Census Data - Chazel, Quebec

Year	Pop.	±%
1941	538	—
1951	574	+6.7%
1956	593	+3.3%
1961	571	−3.7%
1966	531	−7.0%
1971	487	−8.3%
1976	374	−23.2%
1981	371	−0.8%

Year	Pop.	±%
1986	407	+9.7%
1991	373	−8.4%
1996	388	+4.0%
2001	330	−14.9%
2006	321	−2.7%
2011	289	−10.0%
2016	289	+0.0%
2021	254	−12.1%

Source: Statistics Canada

=== Language ===
Canada Census Mother Tongue - Chazel, Quebec
Census	Total	French			English			French & English			Other		
Year	Responses	Count	Trend	Pop %	Count	Trend	Pop %	Count	Trend	Pop %	Count	Trend	Pop %
2021	250	240	▼15.8%	96.0%	5	0.0%	2.0%	5	▲ n/a%	2.0%	0	0.0%	0.0%
2016	290	285	▼1.7%	98.3%	5	▲ n/a%	1.7%	0	0.0%	0.0%	0	0.0%	0.0%
2011	290	290	▼9.4%	100.0%	0	0.0%	0.0%	0	0.0%	0.0%	0	0.0%	0.0%
2006	320	320	0.0%	100.0%	0	▼100.0%	0.0%	0	0.0%	0.0%	0	0.0%	0.0%
2001	330	320	▼17.9%	97.0%	10	▲ n/a%	3.0%	0	0.0%	0.0%	0	0.0%	0.0%
1996	390	390	n/a	100.0%	0	n/a	0.0%	0	n/a	0.0%	0	n/a	0.0%

== Government ==
Municipal council (as of 2024):

- Mayor: Daniel Favreau
- Councillors: Charles Fortin, Serge Morin, Audrey Veillette, Armande Bouchard, Réjean Veillette, Yves Frappier

List of former mayors:

- Émilien Savard (...–2005)
- Denis Hince (2005–2009)
- Daniel Favreau (2009–present)

=== Political representation ===
Chazel federal election results
Year	Liberal		Conservative		Bloc Québécois		New Democratic		Green	
2021	12%	7	16%	10	57%	37	3%	2	5%	3
2019	7%	6	36%	29	54%	44	0%	0	3%	2
2015	23%	25	9%	10	16%	17	50%	54	2%	2
2011	5%	5	13%	13	21%	21	61%	61	0%	0
2008	19%	15	16%	13	35%	28	24%	19	6%	5
2006	17%	20	16%	19	50%	61	13%	16	4%	5
2004	28%	32	5%	6	64%	74	3%	3	1%	1

Chazel provincial election results
Year	CAQ		Liberal		QC solidaire		Parti Québécois	
2022	45%	57	4%	5	10%	13	17%	22
2018	47%	34	0%	0	10%	7	40%	29
2014	13%	11	12%	10	8%	6	67%	54
2012	25%	28	26%	29	7%	8	40%	45

Provincially it is part of the riding of Abitibi-Ouest. In the 2022 Quebec general election the incumbent MNA Suzanne Blais, of the Coalition Avenir Québec, was re-elected to represent the population of Chazel in the National Assembly of Quebec.

Federally, Chazel is part of the federal riding of Abitibi—Témiscamingue. In the 2021 Canadian federal election, the incumbent Sébastien Lemire of the Bloc Québécois was re-elected to represent the population Chazel in the House of Commons of Canada.

== See also ==
- List of municipalities in Quebec
