= Amos, Quebec =

Amos
- Town
- Amos in 2026

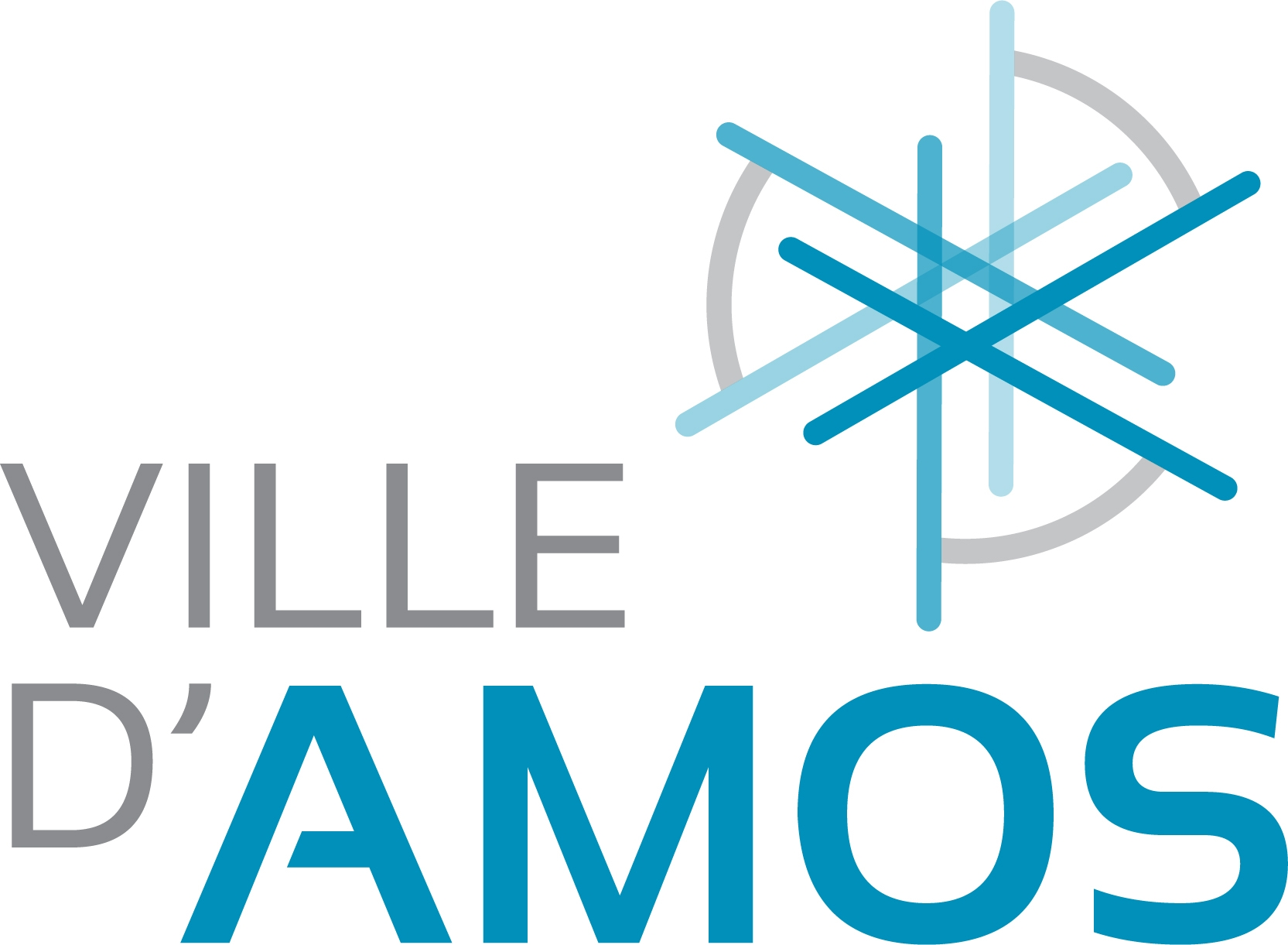
- Seal Coat of arms

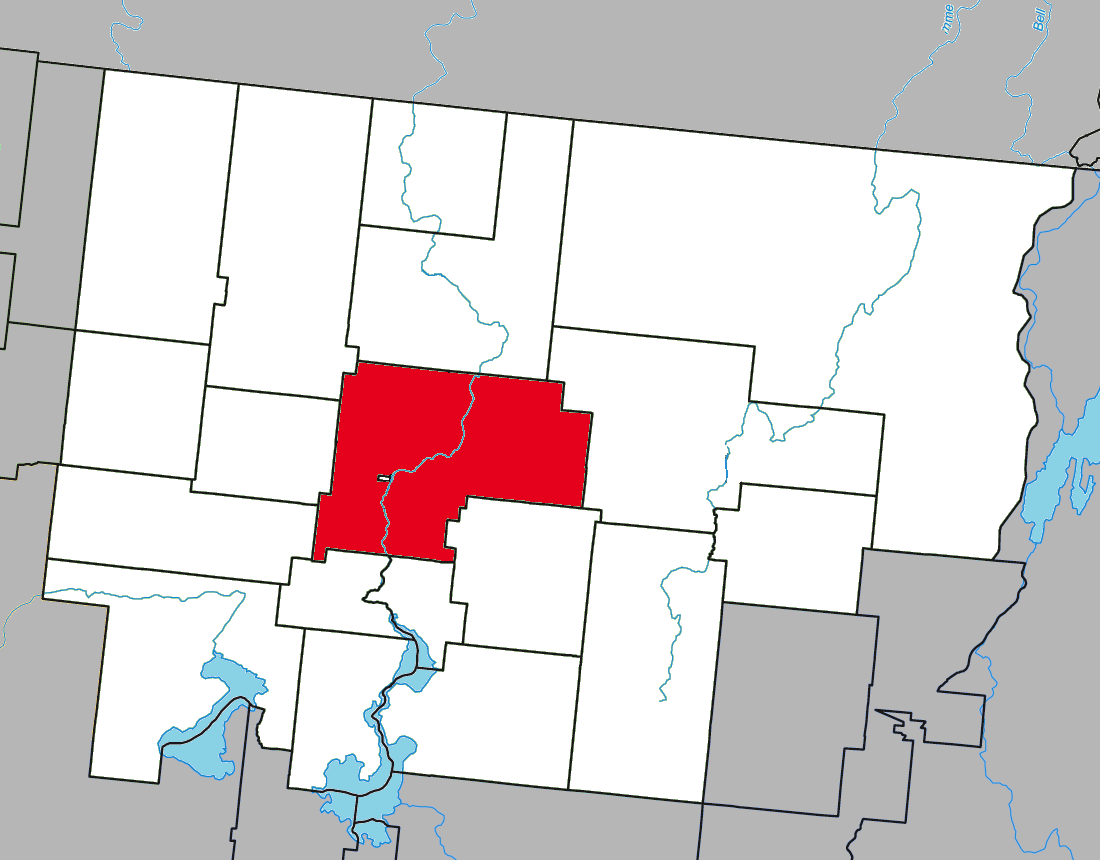
- Location within Abitibi RCM

- Location in western Quebec
- Coordinates: 48°34′N 78°07′W
- Country: Canada
- Province: Quebec
- Region: Abitibi-Témiscamingue
- RCM: Abitibi
- Settled: 1910
- Constituted: January 1, 2025

Government
  - Mayor: Sébastien D'Astous
  - Federal riding: Abitibi—Témiscamingue
  - Prov. riding: Abitibi-Ouest

Area
  - Total: 551.21 km^{2} (212.82 sq mi)
  - Land: 542.19 km^{2} (209.34 sq mi)
  - Urban: 8.43 km^{2} (3.25 sq mi)
  - Metro: 2,298.16 km^{2} (887.32 sq mi)
- Elevation: 310.00 m (1,017.06 ft)

Population (2021)
  - Total: 13,701
  - Density: 25.3/km^{2} (66/sq mi)
  - Urban: 9,281
  - Urban density: 1,101.2/km^{2} (2,852/sq mi)
  - Metro: 18,873
  - Metro density: 8.2/km^{2} (21/sq mi)
  - Pop (2016-21): ▼0.5%
  - Dwellings: 6,465
- Demonym(s): Amossois, Amossoise
- Time zone: UTC−5 (EST)
  - Summer (DST): UTC−4 (EDT)
- Postal code(s): J9T, J0Y 1G0
- Area code: 819
- Highways: R-109 R-111 R-395
- Website: www.amos.quebec

Amos (French pronunciation: [amɔs]) is a town in northwestern Quebec, Canada, on the Harricana River. It is the seat of Abitibi Regional County Municipality.

Amos is the main town on the Harricana River, and the smallest of the three primary towns – after Rouyn-Noranda and Val-d'Or – in the Abitibi-Témiscamingue region of Quebec. The smaller communities of Lac-Gauvin and Saint-Maurice-de-Dalquier are also within the municipal boundaries of Amos.

== History ==
The Amos Roman Catholic Cathedral

Rupert's Land, in which Abitibi was located, was owned by the Hudson's Bay Company and was bought by Canada in 1869. Abitibi itself was then annexed to the province in Quebec on June 13, 1898, by an act of the federal Parliament.

Amos was the starting point for the colonization of the region of Abitibi that began in 1910. The municipality was established in 1914 while the city itself was chartered in 1925. The name of the city came from the maiden name of the wife of Sir Lomer Gouin, then premier of Quebec.

A related municipality was created in 1917 under the name 'Municipalité de la partie ouest des cantons unis de Figuery et Dalquier' (Municipality of the western part of the united townships of Figuery and Dalquier) which changed its name to Amos-Ouest in 1949. In 1974 the municipality fused with the city of Amos proper. Another related municipality was created in 1918 under the name 'Municipalité de la partie est des cantons Figuery et Dalquier' (Municipality of the eastern part of the united townships of Figuery and Dalquier), which also changed its name later 1950 to Amos-Est. The municipality was finally integrated into the city of Amos itself in 1987. In 2025, the municipality of Saint-Félix-de-Dalquier was annexed into Amos.

== Geography ==
=== Climate ===
Amos has a humid continental climate (Köppen Dfb), just above a subarctic climate (Dfc), with warm summers, frigid winters and heavy precipitation for most of the year.

Climate data for Amos
Month	Jan	Feb	Mar	Apr	May	Jun	Jul	Aug	Sep	Oct	Nov	Dec	Year
Record high °C (°F)	8.3 (46.9)	11.0 (51.8)	21.7 (71.1)	29.0 (84.2)	32.2 (90.0)	37.2 (99.0)	37.2 (99.0)	35.6 (96.1)	32.8 (91.0)	26.7 (80.1)	20.0 (68.0)	14.5 (58.1)	37.2 (99.0)
Mean daily maximum °C (°F)	−11.7 (10.9)	−9.0 (15.8)	−2.2 (28.0)	6.4 (43.5)	15.6 (60.1)	21.0 (69.8)	23.1 (73.6)	21.3 (70.3)	15.4 (59.7)	8.0 (46.4)	−0.6 (30.9)	−8.5 (16.7)	6.6 (43.9)
Daily mean °C (°F)	−17.3 (0.9)	−15.2 (4.6)	−8.2 (17.2)	0.9 (33.6)	9.3 (48.7)	14.7 (58.5)	17.2 (63.0)	15.6 (60.1)	10.5 (50.9)	4.1 (39.4)	−4.0 (24.8)	−13.2 (8.2)	1.2 (34.2)
Mean daily minimum °C (°F)	−22.8 (−9.0)	−21.3 (−6.3)	−14.1 (6.6)	−4.6 (23.7)	3.0 (37.4)	8.3 (46.9)	11.2 (52.2)	9.9 (49.8)	5.5 (41.9)	0.2 (32.4)	−7.4 (18.7)	−18 (0)	−4.2 (24.4)
Record low °C (°F)	−48.9 (−56.0)	−52.8 (−63.0)	−42.2 (−44.0)	−29.4 (−20.9)	−16.7 (1.9)	−5.6 (21.9)	−3.9 (25.0)	−1.7 (28.9)	−7.2 (19.0)	−14.4 (6.1)	−33.3 (−27.9)	−47.8 (−54.0)	−52.8 (−63.0)
Average precipitation mm (inches)	55.1 (2.17)	35.1 (1.38)	52.7 (2.07)	62.6 (2.46)	79.0 (3.11)	96.9 (3.81)	112.8 (4.44)	99.8 (3.93)	110.7 (4.36)	84.4 (3.32)	71.5 (2.81)	57.9 (2.28)	918.4 (36.16)
Average rainfall mm (inches)	4.8 (0.19)	2.2 (0.09)	14.3 (0.56)	39.9 (1.57)	77.7 (3.06)	96.9 (3.81)	112.8 (4.44)	99.8 (3.93)	110.2 (4.34)	75.3 (2.96)	29.6 (1.17)	7.3 (0.29)	670.7 (26.41)
Average snowfall cm (inches)	50.6 (19.9)	33.0 (13.0)	38.2 (15.0)	22.8 (9.0)	1.3 (0.5)	0.1 (0.0)	0 (0)	0 (0)	0.4 (0.2)	9.1 (3.6)	41.8 (16.5)	51.0 (20.1)	248.4 (97.8)
Average precipitation days (≥ 0.2 mm)	11.6	8.1	9.4	10.2	12.2	14.1	14.9	14.0	16.7	15.3	13.3	12.5	152.3
Average rainy days (≥ 0.2 mm)	0.82	0.75	3.2	6.9	12.0	14.1	14.9	14.0	16.6	13.9	5.3	1.4	103.7
Average snowy days (≥ 0.2 cm)	11.0	7.8	6.9	4.2	0.45	0.03	0	0	0.14	2.6	9.4	11.5	54.0
Mean monthly sunshine hours	81.3	121.4	152.1	173.3	212.8	235.3	249.4	215.6	131.5	83.7	52.9	59.8	1,769
Source: Environment Canada

== Demographics ==
Historical census populations – Amos, Quebec

Year	Pop.	±%
1921	1,488	—
1931	2,153	+44.7%
1941	2,862	+32.9%
1951	4,265	+49.0%
1956	5,145	+20.6%
1961	6,080	+18.2%

Year	Pop.	±%
1966	6,838	+12.5%
1971	6,984	+2.1%
1976	9,213	+31.9%
1981	9,421	+2.3%
1986	9,261	−1.7%
1991	13,783	+48.8%

Year	Pop.	±%
1996	13,632	−1.1%
2001	13,044	−4.3%
2006	12,584	−3.5%
2011	12,671	+0.7%
2016	12,823	+1.2%
2021	12,675	−1.2%

Source: Statistics Canada

In the 2021 Census of Population conducted by Statistics Canada, Amos had a population of 12,675 living in 5,760 of its 6,051 total private dwellings, a change of −1.2% from its 2016 population of 12,823. With a land area of 429.04 km^{2} (165.65 sq mi), it had a population density of 29.5/km^{2} (76.5/sq mi) in 2021.

Mother tongue:

- English as first language: 0.7%
- French as first language: 97.3%
- English and French as first language: 0.5%
- Other as first language: 1.2%

== Economy ==
Its main resources are spring water, gold, and wood products, including paper.

In 2012, Quebec Lithium Corp. re-opened Canada's first lithium mine, which had operated as an underground mine from 1955–65. They are planning to carve an open pit mine over pegmatite dikes. (The pegmatite is about 1% lithium carbonate.) The mine is about 60 kilometres (37 mi) north of Val-d'Or, 38 kilometres (24 mi) southeast of Amos, and 15 kilometres (9.3 mi) km west of Barraute. It is in the northeast corner of La Corne Township. Access to the mine is via paved road from Val d'Or.

== Government ==
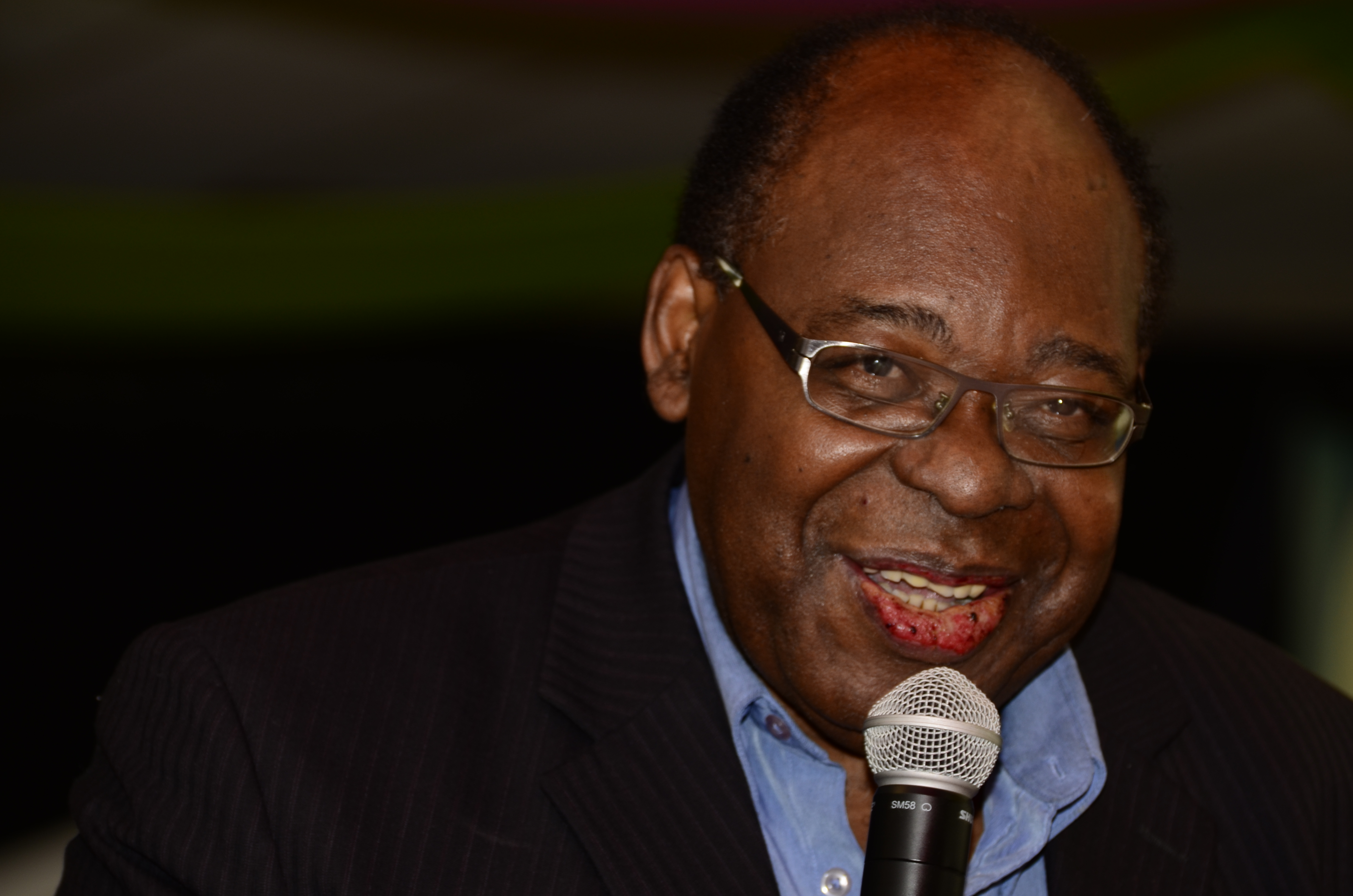
Former Mayor Ulrick Chérubin during an event associated with Amos's centennial celebration.

The current mayor of the city is Sébastien D'Astous, who took office on February 20, 2015, after winning a by-election following the death in office of former Mayor Ulrick Chérubin in September 2014. In the by-election D'Astous, formerly a city councillor, defeated Donald Blanchet, who had served as interim mayor between Chérubin's death and the by-election.

In the National Assembly of Quebec, Amos is within the electoral district of Abitibi-Ouest, represented by Coalition Avenir Québec MNA Suzanne Blais. In the House of Commons of Canada, the city is in the Abitibi—Témiscamingue district, represented by Bloc Québécois MP Sébastien Lemire.

Amos is the seat of the judicial district of Abitibi.

=== Mayors ===
List of former mayors:

- Hector Authier, 1914-1918
- David Gourd, 1918-1921
- Joseph Grenier, 1921-1923
- J.O. Germain, 1923-1928
- T.A. Lalonde, 1928-1929
- J.É. Montambault, 1929-1931
- Julien Beaudry, 1931-1934
- G.A. Brunet, 1934-1939
- Fridolin Simard, 1939-1943
- G.A. Brunet, 1943-1947
- Fridolin Simard, 1947-1957
- G.A. Brunet, 1957-1965
- Gérard Magny, 1965-1971
- Jean-Hugues Boutin, 1971-1974
- Laurier St-Laurent, 1974-1982
- Marcel Lesyk, 1982-1987
- Jean-Paul Veilleux, 1987-1990
- André Brunet, 1990-1998
- Murielle Angers-Turpin, 1998-2002
- Ulrick Chérubin, 2002-2014
- Donald Blanchet, 2014-2015
- Sébastien D'Astous, 2015–present

== Infrastructure ==
Passenger trains no longer serve Amos, but the town once had a Canadian National Railway station. Amos is served by Quebec highways 109, 111 and 395 and Amos/Magny Airport.

== Notable people ==
- Fany Britt, playwriter
- Maxime Brinck-Croteau, olympian
- Karol-Ann Canuel, cyclist
- Ulrick Chérubin, first black mayor of the Province of Québec
- Roy Dupuis, actor
- Keven Lacombe, cyclist
- Guillaume Lefebvre, hockey player
- Marc Lemay, politician and lawyer
- Martin Lemay, politician
- Pierrick Naud, cyclist
- Marc Ouellet, cardinal
- Mathieu Roy, hockey player
- Nicolas Roy, hockey player
- Samian, rapper and actor
