= Jean-Hugues Boutin =

Canadian politician

Mayor of Amos, Quebec
- In office 1971–1974
- Preceded by: Gérard Magny
- Succeeded by: Laurier Saint-Laurent

MNA for Abitibi-Ouest
- In office 1973–1976
- Preceded by: Aurèle Audet
- Succeeded by: François Gendron

Personal details
- Born: January 9, 1936 (age 90) Amos, Quebec, Canada
- Party: Liberal

Jean-Hugues Boutin (French pronunciation: [ʒɑ̃ yɡ butɛ̃]; born January 9, 1936) is a former Canadian politician, who served as mayor of Amos, Quebec from 1971 to 1974, and in the National Assembly of Quebec from 1973 to 1976.

Born and raised in Amos, he was educated at the Université de Montréal and Université Laval before joining his father's company, Jean B. Boutin Inc., in 1961. He was first elected to the city's municipal council in 1967, serving until his election as mayor in 1971. Elected to the National Assembly in the 1973 election as a Liberal, he served as a provincial legislator until his defeat by François Gendron of the Parti Québécois in the 1976 election.

Following his defeat, he worked in an administrative capacity for the municipality of Baie-James, and later became a certified financial planner. He served on the board of directors of AXA Canada in 2005 and 2006.
