= Barraute =

- Municipality
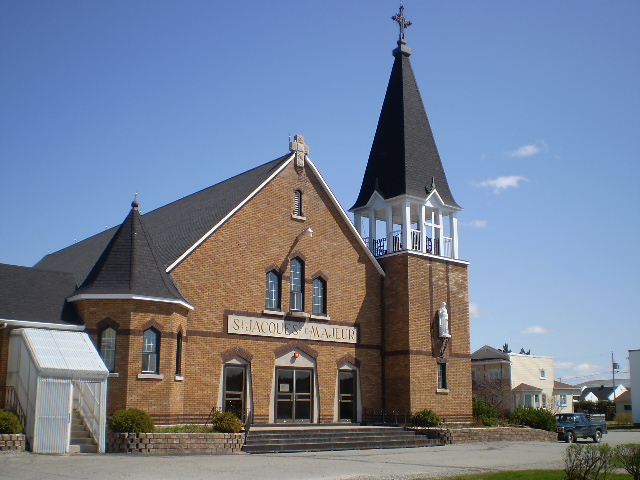

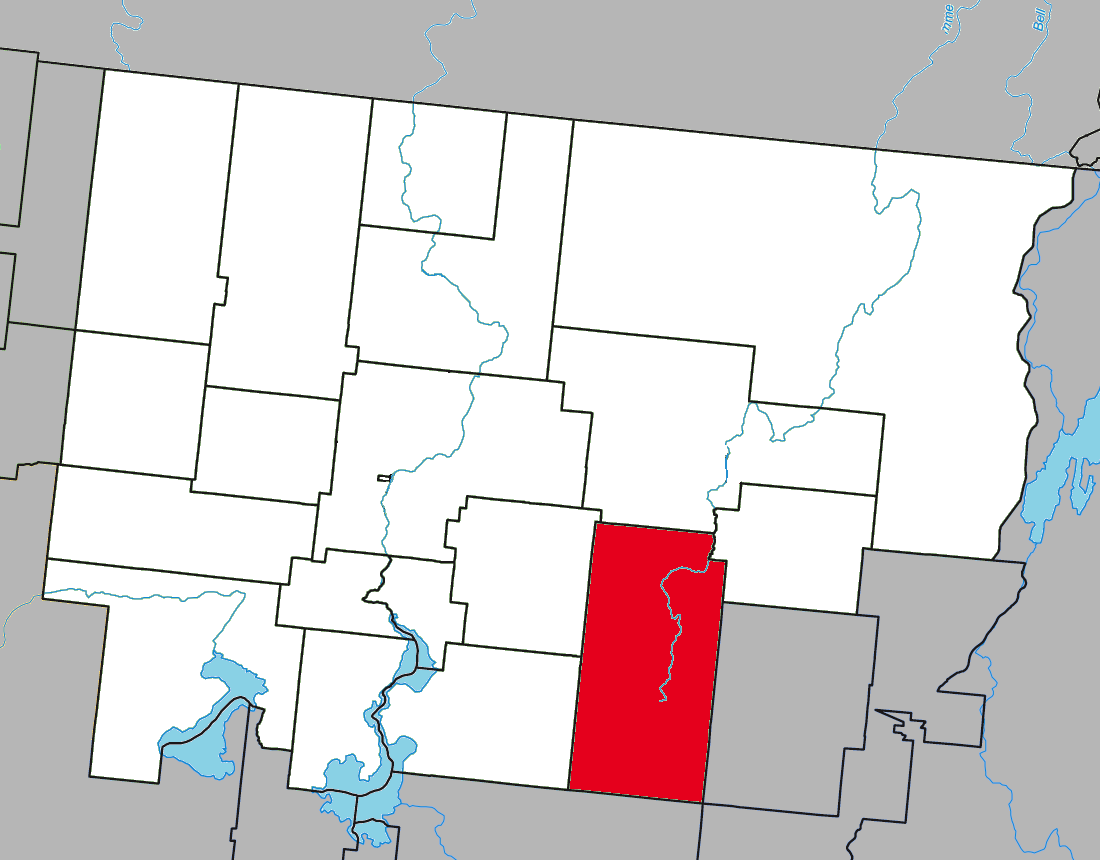
- Location within Abitibi RCM

- Location in western Quebec
- Coordinates: 48°26′N 77°38′W
- Country: Canada
- Province: Quebec
- Region: Abitibi-Témiscamingue
- RCM: Abitibi
- Settled: 1910s
- Constituted: January 5, 1994

Government
  - Mayor: Josseline Lepage
  - Federal riding: Abitibi—Témiscamingue
  - Prov. riding: Abitibi-Ouest

Area
  - Total: 507.79 km^{2} (196.06 sq mi)
  - Land: 493.04 km^{2} (190.36 sq mi)

Population (2021)
  - Total: 1,986
  - Density: 4/km^{2} (10/sq mi)
  - Pop (2016-21): ▲0.9%
  - Dwellings: 1,012
- Time zone: UTC−05:00 (EST)
  - Summer (DST): UTC−04:00 (EDT)
- Postal code(s): J0Y 1A0
- Area code: 819
- Highways: R-386 R-397
- Website: Official website

Barraute (French pronunciation: [baʁot]) is a municipality in the Canadian province of Quebec, located in the Abitibi Regional County Municipality.

It is home to the Mont-Vidéo Ski Resort.

== History ==
Colonization began after the completion of the National Transcontinental Railway through the Abitibi region. In 1916, the family of Uldéric Hardy arrived, followed by a further 20 in 1917 and, by 1918, the place had a total of some 30 families. The new settlement was initially called Natagan, taken from the Natagan River, a First Nations name that means "winding waters." In 1917, the Natagan River Post Office opened, renamed to Barraute in 1919.

In 1918, the United Township Municipality of Fiedmont-et-Barraute was formed, incorporating the geographic townships of Fiedmont and Barraute (proclaimed in 1916). Pierre-Jean Bachoie, called Barraute (1723–1760), was an officer of the Régiment de Béarn in the army of General Montcalm and member of the Order of Saint Louis. Fiedmont likewise was an officer of the army of Montcalm.

In 1948, a portion of the municipal territory separated and was incorporated as the Village Municipality of Barraute. In 1950, zinc and silver mines began operating, that in addition to its favourable location along the railroad and Laflamme River (a tributary of the Bell River), contributed to the local prosperity. In 1951, the United Township Municipality of Fiedmont-et-Barraute changed status to just municipality. But the closure of the zinc and silver mines in 1957, as well as the closure in 1965 of Canada's only lithium mine in neighbouring La Corne, dealt a blow to the economy of Barraute.

In 1978, the Town of Barville (incorporated in 1953) was merged into the Municipality of Fiedmont-et-Barraute and, in 1994, the Municipalities of Fiedmont-et-Barraute and Barraute were regrouped into the new Municipality of Barraute.

== Demographics ==
Historical census populations – Barraute

Year	Pop.	±%
1991	2,200	—
1996	2,134	−3.0%
2001	2,010	−5.8%
2006	2,062	+2.6%

Year	Pop.	±%
2011	1,980	−4.0%
2016	1,968	−0.6%
2021	1,986	+0.9%

Source: Statistics Canada

Private dwellings occupied by usual residents (2021): 930 (total dwellings: 1,012)

Mother tongue (2021):

- English as first language: 0.5%
- French as first language: 98.7%
- English and French as first language: 0.3%
- Other as first language: 0.5%

== Economy ==
In 2012, Quebec Lithium Corp. reopened Quebec Lithium Mine, which had operated as an underground mine from 1955 to 1965. They are planning to carve an open pit mine over pegmatite dikes. (The pegmatite is about 1% lithium carbonate.) The mine is about 60 km (37 mi) north of Val-d'Or, 38 km (24 mi) southeast of Amos, and 15 km (9.3 mi) west of Barraute. Access to the mine is via paved road from Val-d'Or.

== Government ==
Municipal council (as of 2024):

- Mayor: Josseline Lepage
- Councillors: Michel Gagnon, Marie-Joëlle Desrosiers, Lucie Grenier, Joël Jobin, Manon Plante, Jérôme Petit

== See also ==
- List of mines in Quebec
