= Alcide Courcy =

Canadian politician (1914–2000)

Member of the Quebec National Assembly for Abitibi-Ouest
- In office 1956–1970
- Preceded by: Émile Lesage
- Succeeded by: Aurèle Audet

Personal details
- Born: November 3, 1914 Saint-Onésime-d'Ixworth, Quebec
- Died: May 22, 2000 (aged 85) Ste-Foy, Quebec
- Resting place: Danville, Quebec
- Party: Quebec Liberal Party
- Occupation: Agronomist, agricultural consultant

Alcide Courcy (November 3, 1914 – May 22, 2000) was a Canadian politician, cabinet minister and a four-term Member of the National Assembly of Quebec.

== Early life ==
Alcide Courcy was born in the town of Saint-Onésime-d'Ixworth, Quebec, in 1914. He was educated at l'École d'agriculture de Sainte-Anne-de-la-Pocatière, where he received his bachelor's degree in agricultural science.

After college, Courcy moved to the Abitibi region, where he began working as an agronomist and agricultural consultant. He was active in the local community in the town of Macamic, working with local agricultural cooperatives and unions. Courcy, along with Lucien Cliche and Jean-Pierre Bonneville, founded Le Progrès de Rouyn-Noranda, a local newspaper in 1954.

== Political career ==
Courcy first ran for the Liberals in the 1952 election, but was defeated by Émile Lesage of the Union Nationale. Four years later, Courcy defeated Lesage to become the MNA for Abitibi-Ouest. While the Liberals were in opposition, Courcy acted as the chief organizer for the party between 1958 and 1960. Upon the Liberal Party's victory in the 1960 election, Courcy served as Minister of Agriculture and Minister of Colonization from 1960 until 1962 when the two ministries were merged.

As Minister of Agriculture, Courcy streamlined services for farmers, decentralizing agricultural services for farmers in remote areas. Additionally, he helped the agricultural sector modernize in terms of production and marketing.

In the 1970 election, Courcy was defeated and replaced by Aurèle Audet of the Ralliement créditiste.

== Later life ==
In his post political life, Alcide Courcy received honours from the agricultural community, receiving the Order of Agricultural Merit of Quebec and becoming a member of the Temple de la renommée de l'agriculture du Québec (Hall of Fame of Agriculture of Quebec) in 1992.

Courcy died in Sainte-Foy, Quebec, on May 22, 2000, at the age of 85.
