= Ulrick Chérubin =

Canadian politician

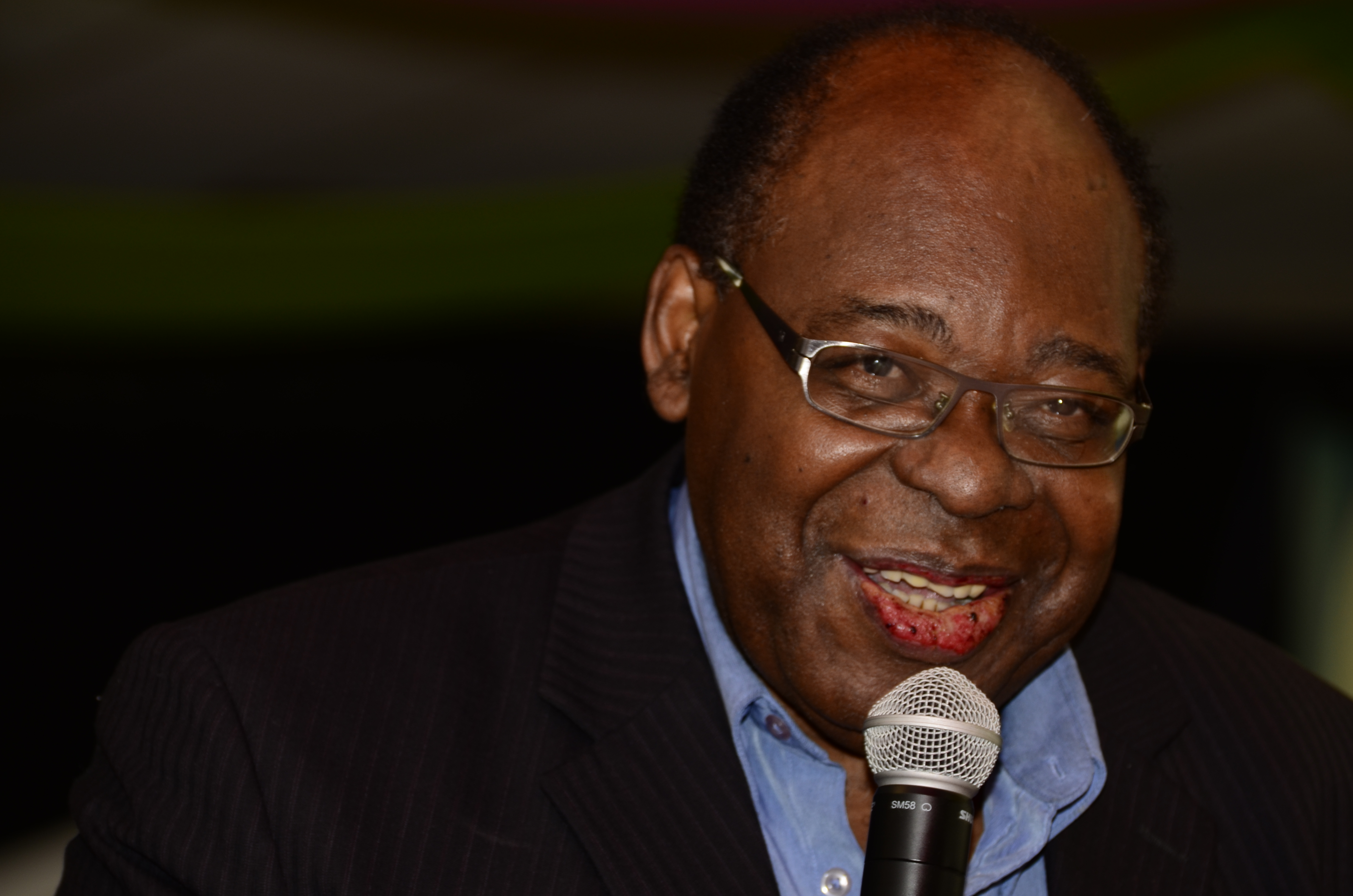
- Chérubin during an event associated to Amos' centennial celebration

Mayor of Amos
- In office November 3, 2002 – September 25, 2014
- Preceded by: Murielle Angers-Turpin
- Succeeded by: Sébastien D'Astous

Personal details
- Born: December 24, 1943 Jacmel, Haiti
- Died: September 25, 2014 (aged 70) Amos, Quebec, Canada
- Spouse: Immacula Morriset
- Profession: Teacher

Ulrick Chérubin (December 24, 1943 – September 25, 2014) was a Canadian politician, who served as mayor of Amos, Quebec, from 2002 until his death in 2014. He was one of the first Black Canadians to be elected a mayor in Quebec.

== Early life ==
The youngest of five children, Chérubin was born in Jacmel, Haiti, in 1943. He was educated in Haiti, where he was a childhood friend and classmate of Michel Adrien, who would later become mayor of Mont-Laurier, Quebec.

Fleeing the dictatorship regime of François Duvalier, Chérubin left Haiti while he was still studying mathematics in a Port-au-Prince university. He moved to Canada in 1970 to study education at the Université du Québec à Trois-Rivières, and subsequently taught religion in Cap-de-la-Madeleine. In 1971, he married Immacula Morriset, a nurse also originally from Haiti.

Chérubin continued to teach in 1973, and also studied administration and English as a Second Language teaching at the Université du Québec en Abitibi-Témiscamingue. He moved to Amos in 1974.

== Political career ==
Chérubin was first elected as a municipal councillor in Amos in 1994, winning his seat with a five-hundred vote majority. After being re-elected unopposed as a councillor in 1998, Chérubin was elected to the position of mayor of Amos. In 2004, he was awarded the Jackie Robinson Award, in honour of his status as a pioneering Black Canadian, by the Montreal Association of Black Business Persons and Professionals.

In 2009, city councillors Charles Yancey and Chuck Turner of Boston, Massachusetts, sponsored a motion declaring January 2, 2010, to be Ulrick Chérubin Day in the City of Boston, when he visited the city.

Chérubin was most recently re-elected in 2013, winning his fourth consecutive term, winning 73% of the vote in a victory over Amos municipal councillor Éric Mathieu.

On November 10, 2013, Chérubin appeared on Le Banquier, the Quebec version of Deal or No Deal, where he won a total of $222,500. Chérubin, who was selected to take part in the program out of a pool of eight thousand initial applicants, appeared in order to promote and raise funds for the centennial celebration of the town of Amos.

== Death ==
On September 25, 2014, Chérubin died in Amos, aged 70 from cardiac failure.
