= Abitibi-Ouest (electoral district) =

Provincial electoral district in Quebec, Canada

Coordinates: 48.75°N 79.00°W

Quebec electoral district
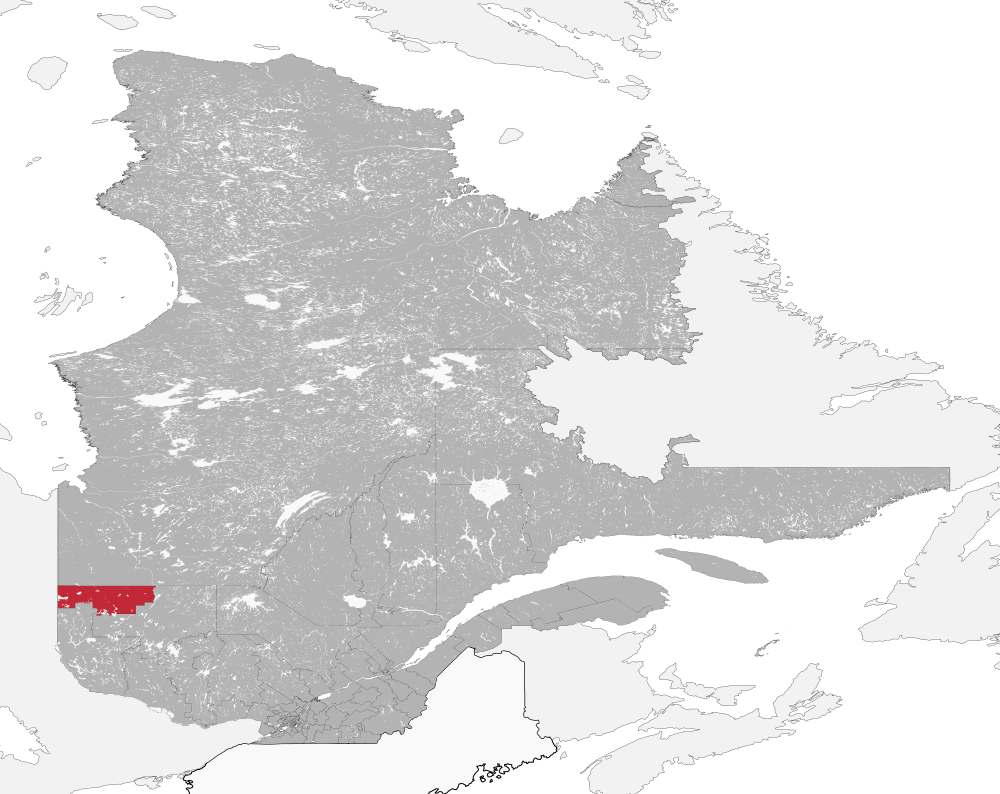

Provincial electoral district
- Legislature: National Assembly of Quebec
MNA
Sébastien D'Astous
Parti Québécois
- District created: 1944
- First contested: 1944
- Last contested: 2026

Demographics
- Electors (2012): 35,082
- Area (km²): 11,528.1
- Census division(s): Abitibi (all), Abitibi-Ouest (all)
- Census subdivision(s): Amos, Authier, Authier-Nord, Barraute, Berry, Champneuf, Chazel, Clermont, Clerval, Duparquet, Dupuy, Gallichan, La Corne, La Morandière-Rochebaucourt, La Motte, La Reine, La Sarre, Landrienne, Launay, Macamic, Normétal, Palmarolle, Poularies, Preissac, Rapide-Danseur, Roquemaure, Saint-Dominique-du-Rosaire, Sainte-Germaine-Boulé, Sainte-Gertrude-Manneville, Sainte-Hélène-de-Mancebourg, Saint-Lambert, Saint-Marc-de-Figuery, Saint-Mathieu-d'Harricana, Taschereau, Trécesson, Val-Saint-Gilles; Pikogan; Lac-Chicobi, Lac-Despinassy, Lac-Duparquet, Rivière-Ojima

Abitibi-Ouest (French pronunciation: [abitibi wɛst]) is a provincial electoral district in the Abitibi-Témiscamingue region of Quebec, Canada, that elects members to the National Assembly of Quebec. It notably includes the municipalities of Amos, La Sarre, Macamic, Barraute, Palmarolle, Trécesson, Sainte-Germaine-Boulé, and Dupuy.

The riding was created for the 1944 election from a part of Abitibi.

In the change from the 2001 to the 2011 electoral map, Abitibi-Ouest gained the municipality of Barraute, as well as the part of the unorganized territory of Lac-Despinassy that it did not already have, from Abitibi-Est.

== Members of the Legislative Assembly / National Assembly ==
Legislature	Years	Member	Party
Riding created from Abitibi
22nd	1944–1948	Émile Lesage	Union Nationale
23rd	1948–1952	Émile Lesage	Union Nationale
24th	1952–1956	Émile Lesage	Union Nationale
25th	1956–1960	Alcide Courcy	Liberal
26th	1960–1962	Alcide Courcy	Liberal
27th	1962–1966	Alcide Courcy	Liberal
28th	1966–1970	Alcide Courcy	Liberal
29th	1970–1973	Aurèle Audet	Ralliement créditiste
30th	1973–1976	Jean-Hugues Boutin	Liberal
31st	1976–1981	François Gendron	Parti Québécois
32nd	1981–1985	François Gendron	Parti Québécois
33rd	1985–1989	François Gendron	Parti Québécois
34th	1989–1994	François Gendron	Parti Québécois
35th	1994–1998	François Gendron	Parti Québécois
36th	1998–2003	François Gendron	Parti Québécois
37th	2003–2007	François Gendron	Parti Québécois
38th	2007–2008	François Gendron	Parti Québécois
39th	2008–2012	François Gendron	Parti Québécois
40th	2012–2014	François Gendron	Parti Québécois
41st	2014–2018	François Gendron	Parti Québécois
42nd	2018–2022	Suzanne Blais	Coalition Avenir Québec
43rd	2022–2026	Suzanne Blais	Coalition Avenir Québec
44th	2026–Present	Sébastien D'Astous	Parti Québécois

== Election results ==
2026 Quebec general election
** Preliminary results — Not yet official **
Party	Candidate	Votes	%	±%
Parti Québécois	Sébastien D'Astous	11,080	49.59	+28.83
Conservative	Daniel Guillemette	4,045	18.10	+7.79
Coalition Avenir Québec	Suzanne Blais	3,433	15.36	–31.39
Québec solidaire	Joanie Bolduc	1,959	8.77	–7.52
Liberal	Marc-André Fortin	1,827	8.18	+3.00
Total valid votes		22,344	98.40	–0.19
Total rejected ballots		364	1.60	+0.19
Turnout		22,708	64.30	+0.60
Electors on the lists		35,317		
Parti Québécois gain from Coalition Avenir Québec		Swing		+10.52
Source: Élections Québec

2022 Quebec general election
Party	Candidate	Votes	%	±%
Coalition Avenir Québec	Suzanne Blais	10,399	46.75	+12.63
Parti Québécois	Samuel Doré	4,619	20.76	-12.50
Québec solidaire	Alexis Lapierre	3,623	16.29	-0.30
Conservative	François Vigneault	2,293	10.31	+9.21
Liberal	Guy Bourgeois	1,153	5.18	-6.13
Union Nationale	Jonathan Blanchette	159	0.71	–
Total valid votes		22,246	98.59	–
Total rejected ballots		319	1.41	–
Turnout		22,565	63.70	
Electors on the lists		35,424		

2018 Quebec general election
Party	Candidate	Votes	%	±%
Coalition Avenir Québec	Suzanne Blais	7,680	34.12	+20.02
Parti Québécois	Sylvain Vachon	7,486	33.26	-8.94
Québec solidaire	Rose Marquis	3,735	16.59	+10.4
Liberal	Martin Veilleux	2,546	11.31	-8.94
Citoyens au pouvoir	Stéphane Lévesque	388	1.72	
Green	Yan-Dominic Couture	254	1.13	
Conservative	Eric Lacroix	248	1.1	
Independent	Maxim Sylvestre	172	0.76	
Total valid votes		22,509	98.37	
Total rejected ballots		372	1.63	
Turnout		22,881	64.75	
Eligible voters		35,339		
Coalition Avenir Québec gain from Parti Québécois		Swing		+14.48
Source(s) "Rapport des résultats officiels du scrutin". Élections Québec.

2014 Quebec general election
Party	Candidate	Votes	%
Parti Québécois	François Gendron	9,267	42.2
Liberal	Serge Bastien	7,615	34.7
Coalition Avenir Québec	Nadia Racine	3,084	14.1
Québec solidaire	Ghislaine Camirand	1,354	6.2
Option nationale	Grégory Vézeau	627	2.9

2012 Quebec general election
Party	Candidate	Votes	%
Parti Québécois	François Gendron	12,066	51.36
Coalition Avenir Québec	Sébastien D'Astous	4,579	20.26
Liberal	Claude Nelson Morin	4,399	18.73
Québec solidaire	Ghislaine Camirand	1,260	5.36
Option nationale	Grégory Vézeau	1,007	4.29

2008 Quebec general election
Party	Candidate	Votes	%
Parti Québécois	François Gendron	10,597	57.32
Liberal	Claude Nelson Morin	5,317	28.76
Action démocratique	Sébastien D'Astous	2,198	11.89
Parti indépendantiste	Grégory Vézeau	375	2.03

2007 Quebec general election
Party	Candidate	Votes	%
Parti Québécois	François Gendron	10,983	48.38
Action démocratique	Eric Mathieu	5,529	24.36
Liberal	Jean-Louis Carignan	5,376	23.68
Québec solidaire	Caroline Sigouin	814	3.59

2003 Quebec general election
Party	Candidate	Votes	%
Parti Québécois	François Gendron	9,677	45.44
Liberal	Jean-Louis Carignan	7,960	37.37
Action démocratique	Claude Morin	3,661	17.19

1998 Quebec general election
Party	Candidate	Votes	%
Parti Québécois	François Gendron	14,733	59.48
Liberal	Martin Veilleux	7,333	29.60
Action démocratique	Michelle Melançon	2,430	9.81
Independent	René Lacroix	274	1.11

1994 Quebec general election
Party	Candidate	Votes	%
Parti Québécois	François Gendron	17,391	74.37
Liberal	Rudolphe Corriveau	5,993	25.63

1989 Quebec general election
Party	Candidate	Votes	%
Parti Québécois	François Gendron	15,588	67.40
Liberal	Marcel Lesyk	7,541	32.60

== See also ==
- List of Quebec provincial electoral districts
- Canadian provincial electoral districts
