= Aurèle Audet =

Canadian politician (1920–2015)

Aurèle Audet (October 12, 1920 – November 28, 2015) was a politician in Quebec, Canada and a Member of the National Assembly of Quebec (MNA).

== Background ==
He was born in La Sarre, Quebec, on October 12, 1920, and made a career in the dairy industry. He died at the age of 95 in 2015.

== Political career ==
Audet ran as a candidate of the newly formed provincial wing of the Ralliement créditiste in the 1970 election and won, becoming the Member of the National Assembly for the district of Abitibi-Ouest.

During his term of office, the party was plagued by internal divisions. While three MNAs, including Audet, remained loyal to Leader Camil Samson, the rest of the caucus withdrew its support and appointed Armand Bois as temporary leader, until a leadership convention could determine a new leader.

Eventually, the Samson faction re-joined the party and Audet served as House Whip. Nonetheless, Audet and most of his colleagues lost their bid for re-election in the 1973 election.

== See also ==
- History of Quebec

National Assembly of Quebec
Preceded by Alcide Courcy (Liberal)	MNA for Abitibi-Ouest; 1970–1973	Succeeded by Jean-Hugues Boutin (Liberal)
