= Lac-Chicobi =

- Unorganized territory
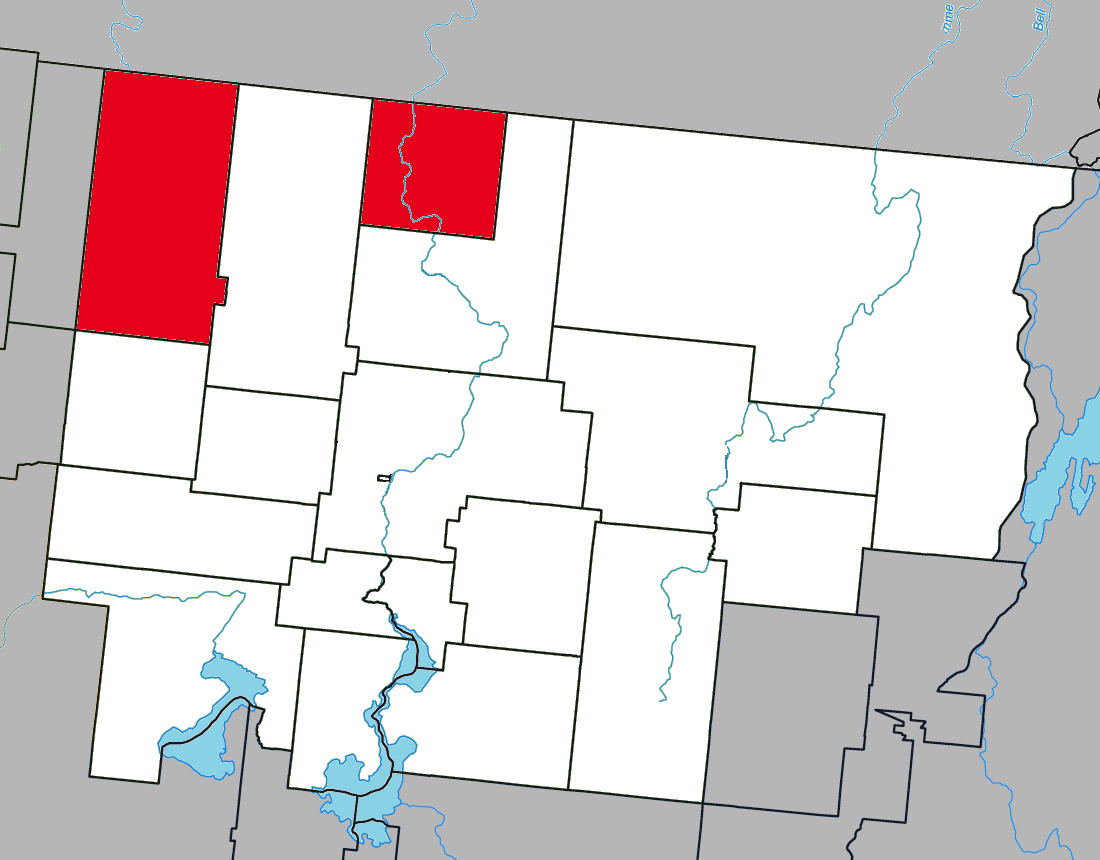
- Location within Abitibi RCM.

- Location in western Quebec.
- Coordinates: 48°53′N 78°30′W
- Country: Canada
- Province: Quebec
- Region: Abitibi-Témiscamingue
- RCM: Abitibi
- Constituted: January 1, 1986

Government
  - Federal riding: Abitibi—Témiscamingue
  - Prov. riding: Abitibi-Ouest

Area
  - Total: 740.20 km^{2} (285.79 sq mi)
  - Land: 716.01 km^{2} (276.45 sq mi)

Population (2021)
  - Total: 161
  - Density: 0.2/km^{2} (0.52/sq mi)
  - Pop 2006-2011: ▲18.4%
  - Dwellings: 81
- Time zone: UTC−05:00 (EST)
  - Summer (DST): UTC−04:00 (EDT)
- Postal Code: J0Y 1L0
- Area code: 819
- Highways: No major routes

Lac-Chicobi (French pronunciation: [lak ʃikɔbi]) is an unorganized territory in the Canadian province of Quebec, located within the Abitibi Regional County Municipality. The area consists of two non-contiguous portions on either side of the incorporated municipality of Berry.

The area had a population of 161 in the 2021 Canadian Census, and a land area of 716.01 km^{2} (276.45 sq mi).

The eponymous Lake Chicobi is roughly in the centre of the territory's western portion. It is fed by the Authier and Chicobi Rivers and drained by the Octave River, a tributary of the Harricana River. The lake's name, in the past also spelled as Chikobi, Chikobee, and Cikobi, comes from a First Nations word meaning "where there are no islands". The Tanginan and Chicobi Hills are two prominent hills south-west of the lake, reaching an altitude of 441 m (1,447 ft).

South of Lake Chicobi is the community of Guyenne (48°46′41″N 78°28′13″W), the territory's only population centre. It is named after the geographic township of Guyenne (proclaimed in 1916), in turn named for the Régiment de Guyenne that fought under General Montcalm's command.

== Demographics ==
Population:

- Population in 2021: 161 (2016 to 2021 population change: 18.4%)
- Population in 2016: 136
- Population in 2011: 203
- Population in 2006: 176
- Population in 2001: 191
- Population in 1996: 227
- Population in 1991: 235

Private dwellings occupied by usual residents: 71 (total dwellings: 81)
