= François Gendron =

Canadian politician

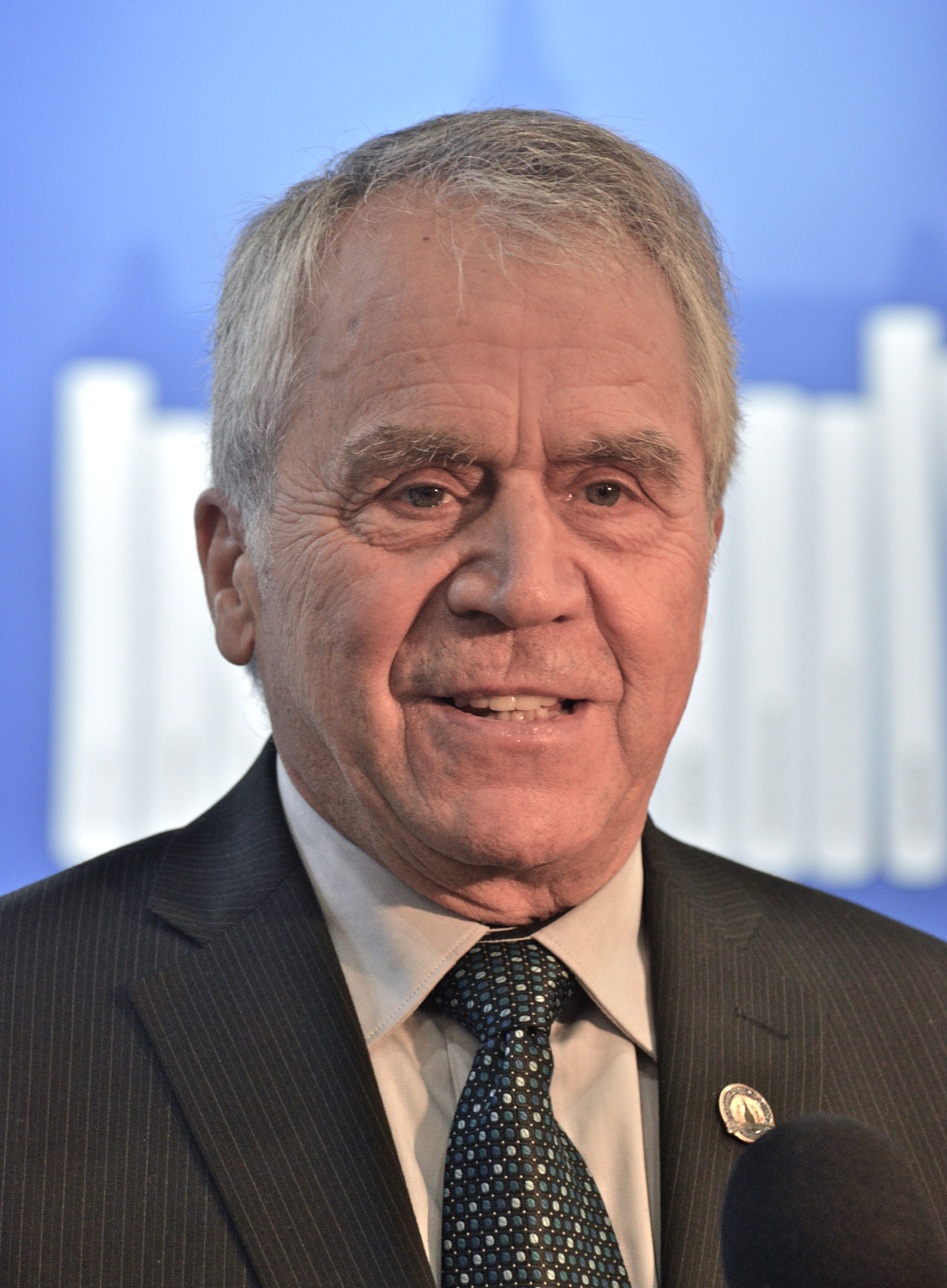

Deputy Premier of Quebec
- In office 2012–2014
- Premier: Pauline Marois
- Preceded by: Michelle Courchesne
- Succeeded by: Lise Thériault

Member of the National Assembly of Quebec for Abitibi-Ouest
- In office November 15, 1976 – October 1, 2018
- Preceded by: Jean-Hugues Boutin
- Succeeded by: Suzanne Blais

43rd President of the National Assembly of Quebec
- In office October 21, 2008 – January 12, 2009
- Preceded by: Michel Bissonnet
- Succeeded by: Yvon Vallières

Interim Leader of the Parti Québécois
- In office May 9, 2007 – June 27, 2007
- Preceded by: André Boisclair
- Succeeded by: Pauline Marois

Personal details
- Born: November 3, 1944 (age 81) Val-Paradis, Quebec, Canada
- Party: Parti Québécois
- Profession: Teacher, Politician
- Portfolio: Municipal Affairs

François Gendron (French pronunciation: [fʁɑ̃swa ʒɑ̃dʁɔ̃]; born November 3, 1944, in Val-Paradis, Quebec) is a politician and teacher in Quebec, Canada. He was a Member of National Assembly of Quebec for the riding of Abitibi-Ouest. He represented the Parti Québécois from 1976 to 2018.

Gendron went to the Université Laval and obtained diplomas in pedagogy and administration. He was then a teacher at Cité Étudiante Polyno in La Sarre, a coordinator at the Commission scolaire Lalonde, and a school counsellor. He was a municipal councillor from 1973 to 1976 in La Sarre and was the founder of the Education Workers Union of Northwestern Quebec in 1967.

Gendron was the longest serving active MNA at the time of his retirement, having been first elected in 1976 when the Parti Québécois led by René Lévesque won its first provincial election. He was named the Assistant Whip and then the Minister of Public Services. After the party’s 1981 re-election, he was named the Minister of Planning and Development and Minister of Education (1984–1985).

When the Parti Québécois returned to the opposition benches after the 1985 election, he was the Deputy Opposition House Leader from 1985 to 1987 and 1989 to 1994 and the Opposition House Leader from 1987 to 1989. He was also named opposition critic after the 1989 election for education, municipal and regional affairs.

After the Parti Québécois returned to power in 1994 with Jacques Parizeau as their leader, he was named Minister of Natural resources and the Deputy Government House Leader. In 1996, he was named the Government Chair Caucus. He remained in that position after the 1998 election until 2002 where he was briefly the Minister of Forest Management and rurality and then the Minister of Natural Resources.

Gendron was re-elected in the 2003 and 2007 general election and was the National Assembly's Third Vice-president (Third Deputy Speaker of the House) from 2003 to 2007.

On May 9, 2007, Gendron was elected acting leader of the Parti Québécois over Marie Malavoy, following the resignation of André Boisclair.

During his tenure as acting leader, he played a major role in the adoption of the 2007 budget tabled by Liberal Finance Minister Monique Jérôme-Forget, as it was during a Liberal minority government. The Parti Québécois had requested additional funding for health, education and the regions as well as a reduction of the income tax cuts that were planned by the Liberals to be $950 million. The Liberals accepted an increase total funding of $111 million without reducing the tax cut and have increased taxes for oil and bank companies. Gendron and the PQ mentioned that the funding was not sufficient to vote for the budget, but only Gendron, House Leader Diane Lemieux and Finance critic François Legault took part of the vote in which the budget passed 46–44 on June 1, 2007.

On August 20, 2007, an article from La Presse reported that Gendron would replace Diane Lemieux as the House Leader of the second opposition group when the National Assembly of Quebec resumed in October 2007.

On October 21, 2008, Gendron was named the President of the National Assembly of Quebec, a position equivalent to Speaker in other legislatures. Initially, Maxime Arseneau was the PQ candidate for the position as well as Marc Picard for the Action démocratique du Québec and Yvon Vallières for the Liberals. After Picard and Arseneau dropped their candidacy, both opposition parties supported the nomination of Gendron. He is the first MNA from an opposition party to be named as President of the National Assembly since 1887. He would serve in that capacity until after the 2008 provincial election.

He currently holds the record as the longest-serving member of the National Assembly, having served for 42 years.

== See also ==
- Presidents of the National Assembly of Quebec

== Footnotes ==
National Assembly of Quebec
Preceded by Michel Bissonnet	President of the National Assembly of Quebec; 2008–2009	Succeeded by Yvon Vallières
Preceded by Michelle Courchesne	Deputy Premier of Quebec; 2012–2014	Succeeded by Lise Thériault
Preceded by Guy Chevrette (PQ)	Official Opposition House Leader; 1987–1989	Succeeded by Guy Chevrette (PQ)
Preceded by Diane Lemieux (PQ)	Second Opposition Group House Leader; 2007–2008	Succeeded by Stéphane Bédard (PQ)
Preceded by Marc Picard (ADQ)	Third Deputy Speaker of the House (Second Time); 2009–2018	Succeeded by
Preceded by Michel Bissonnet (Liberal)	Third Deputy Speaker of the House; 2003–2007	Succeeded by Marc Picard (ADQ)
Political offices
Preceded by Gilles Baril	Minister of Natural Resources; 2002–2003	Succeeded by Sam Hamad
Preceded by André Boisclair	Leader of the Parti Québécois; Interim; 2007	Succeeded by Pauline Marois
