= Dupuy, Quebec =

Dupuy
- Municipality
- Dupuy in 2026

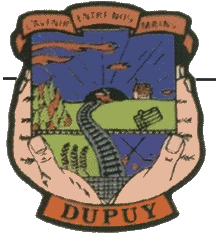
- Coat of arms

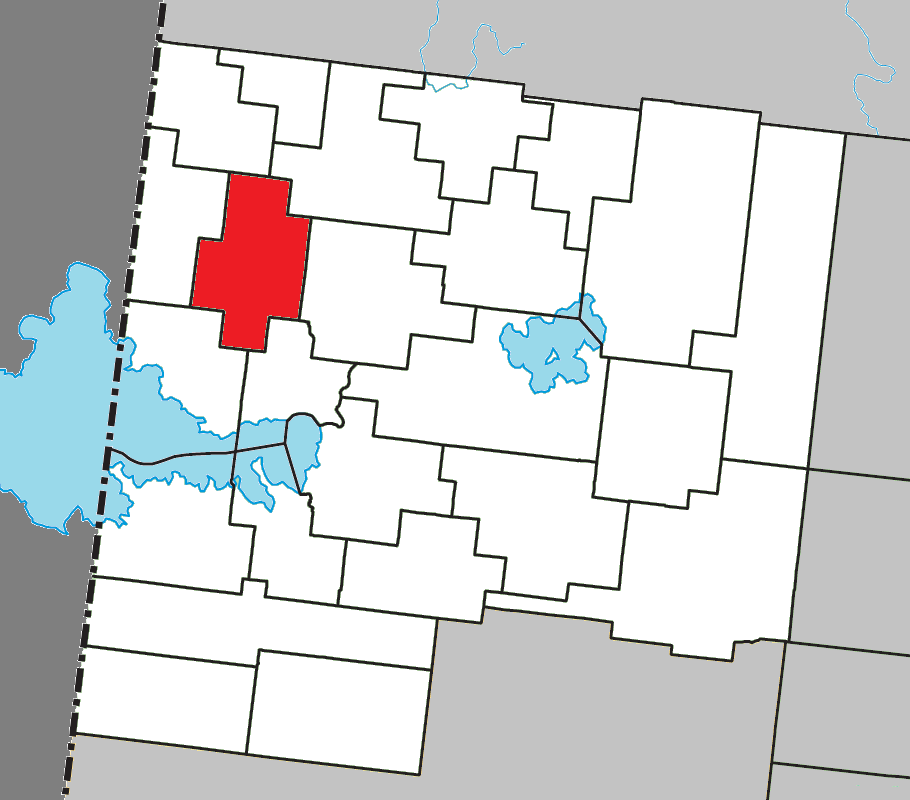
- Location within Abitibi-Ouest RCM

- Location in western Quebec
- Coordinates: 48°50′N 79°21′W
- Country: Canada
- Province: Quebec
- Region: Abitibi-Témiscamingue
- RCM: Abitibi-Ouest
- Settled: 1912
- Constituted: September 20, 1918

Government
  - Mayor: Alain Grégoire
  - Federal riding: Abitibi—Témiscamingue
  - Prov. riding: Abitibi-Ouest

Area
  - Total: 122.70 km^{2} (47.37 sq mi)
  - Land: 122.43 km^{2} (47.27 sq mi)

Population (2021)
  - Total: 940
  - Density: 7.7/km^{2} (20/sq mi)
  - Pop (2016-21): ▲1.0%
  - Dwellings: 414
- Time zone: UTC−5 (EST)
  - Summer (DST): UTC−4 (EDT)
- Postal code(s): J0Z 1X0
- Area code: 819
- Highways: R-111
- Website: www.dupuy.ao.ca

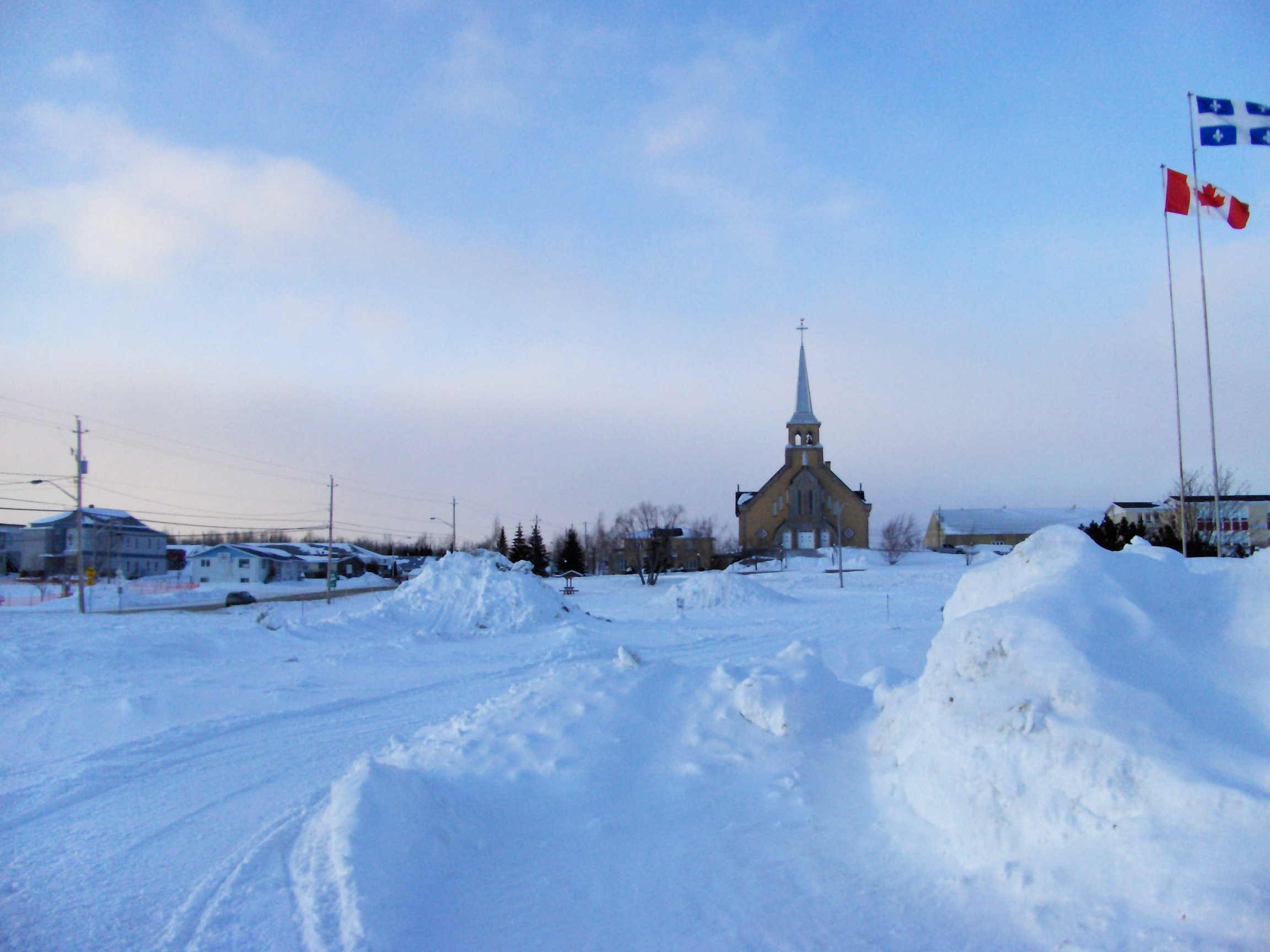
Church of Dupuy

Dupuy (French pronunciation: [dypɥi]) is a municipality in northwestern Quebec, Canada, in the Abitibi-Ouest Regional County Municipality. It covers 123.48 km^{2} and had a population of 940 as of the 2021 Canadian census.

The municipality was incorporated on September 20, 1918, and known as Saint-Jacques-de-Dupuy until March 4, 1995. The name pays tribute to Abbé Jean-Baptiste Dupuy (1804-1879) in 1836, as a missionary at the Lake Abitibi post.

== Demographics ==
=== Population ===
Canada census – Dupuy community profile

| | 2021 | 2016 | 2011 |
| Population | 940 (+1.0% from 2016) | 931 (+0.1% from 2011) | 930 (-2.6% from 2006) |
| Land area | 122.43 km^{2} (47.27 sq mi) | 122.68 km^{2} (47.37 sq mi) | 123.78 km^{2} (47.79 sq mi) |
| Population density | 7.7/km^{2} (20/sq mi) | 7.6/km^{2} (20/sq mi) | 7.5/km^{2} (19/sq mi) |
| Median age | 39.2 (M: 38.4, F: 41.6) | 40.9 (M: 41.0, F: 40.8) | 40.8 (M: 41.4, F: 40.0) |
| Private dwellings | 414 (total) 395 (occupied) | 403 (total) | 399 (total) |
| Median household income | $80,000 | $67,277 | $55,651 |

References: 2021 2016 2011

Historical Census Data - Dupuy, Quebec

| Year | Pop. | ±% |
|---|---|---|
| 1921 | 1,244 | — |
| 1931 | 1,104 | −11.3% |
| 1941 | 2,383 | +115.9% |
| 1951 | 1,342 | −43.7% |
| 1956 | 1,306 | −2.7% |
| 1961 | 1,270 | −2.8% |

| Year | Pop. | ±% |
|---|---|---|
| 1966 | 1,281 | +0.9% |
| 1971 | 1,122 | −12.4% |
| 1976 | 1,041 | −7.2% |
| 1981 | 1,114 | +7.0% |
| 1986 | 1,137 | +2.1% |
| 1991 | 1,161 | +2.1% |

| Year | Pop. | ±% |
|---|---|---|
| 1996 | 1,100 | −5.3% |
| 2001 | 1,010 | −8.2% |
| 2006 | 955 | −5.4% |
| 2011 | 930 | −2.6% |
| 2016 | 931 | +0.1% |
| 2021 | 940 | +1.0% |

Source: Statistics Canada

=== Language ===
Canada Census Mother Tongue - Dupuy, Quebec
| Census | Total | French | | | English | | | French & English | | | Other | | |
| Year | Responses | Count | Trend | Pop % | Count | Trend | Pop % | Count | Trend | Pop % | Count | Trend | Pop % |
| 2021 | 940 | 930 | ▲0.5% | 98.9% | 0 | 0.0% | 0.0% | 5 | ▲ n/a% | 0.5% | 5 | ▲ n/a% | 0.5% |
| 2016 | 930 | 925 | 0.0% | 99.5% | 0 | 0.0% | 0.0% | 0 | 0.0% | 0.0% | 0 | 0.0% | 0.0% |
| 2011 | 925 | 925 | ▼2.6% | 100.0% | 0 | 0.0% | 0.0% | 0 | 0.0% | 0.0% | 0 | 0.0% | 0.0% |
| 2006 | 950 | 950 | ▼3.1% | 100.0% | 0 | ▼100.0% | 0.0% | 0 | 0.0% | 0.0% | 0 | 0.0% | 0.0% |
| 2001 | 990 | 980 | ▼8.8% | 99.0% | 10 | ▲ n/a% | 1.0% | 0 | 0.0% | 0.0% | 0 | 0.0% | 0.0% |
| 1996 | 1,075 | 1,075 | n/a | 100.0% | 0 | n/a | 0.0% | 0 | n/a | 0.0% | 0 | n/a | 0.0% |

== Government ==
Municipal council (as of 2024):

- Mayor: Alain Grégoire
- Councillors: Ronald Lévesque, Pascal Corriveau, Sylvie Germain, Annie St-Pierre, Denise Lessard Morin, Rémi Kelley

List of former mayors:

- Marc-André Côté (...–2013)
- Normand Lagrange (2013–2019)
- Rémi Jean (interim, 2019–2021)
- Alain Grégoire (2021–present)

== See also ==
- List of municipalities in Quebec
