= La Corne =

- Municipality
- La Corne in 2026

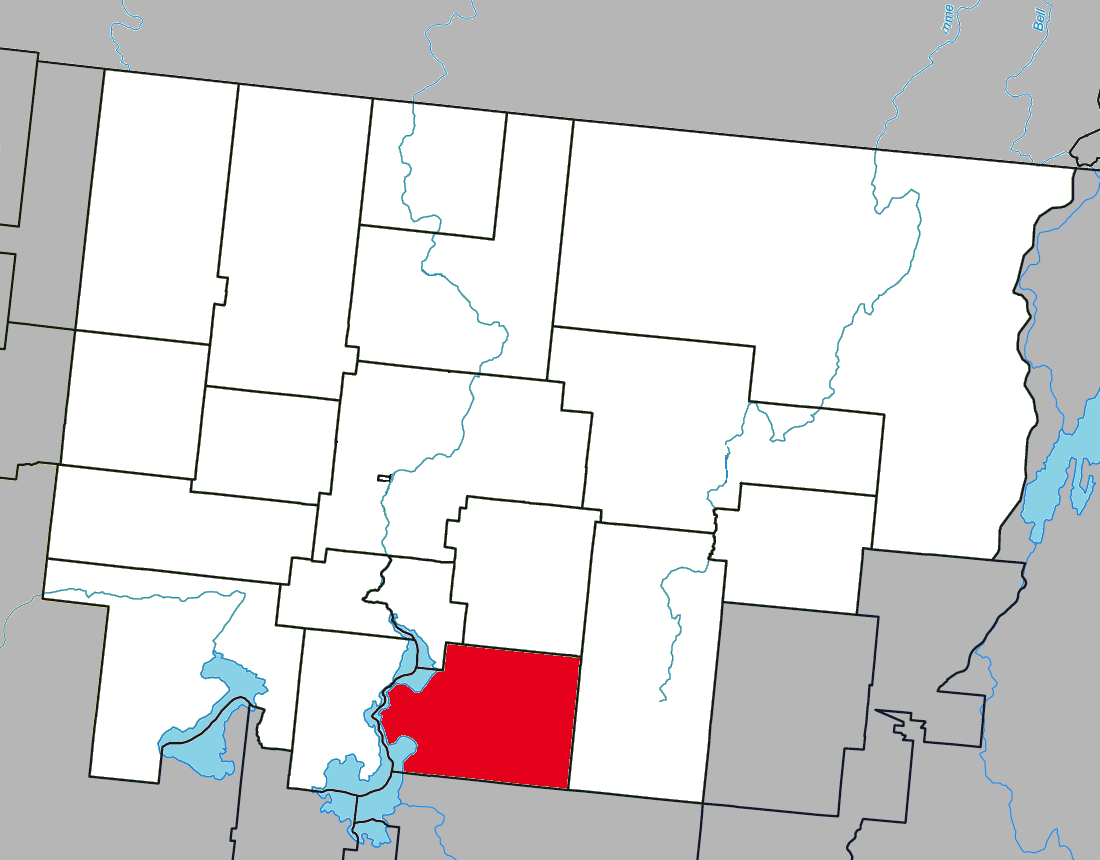
- Location within Abitibi RCM

- Location in western Quebec
- Coordinates: 48°21′N 78°00′W
- Country: Canada
- Province: Quebec
- Region: Abitibi-Témiscamingue
- RCM: Abitibi
- Settled: c. 1935
- Constituted: August 2, 1975

Government
  - Mayor: Éric Comeau
  - Federal riding: Abitibi—Témiscamingue
  - Prov. riding: Abitibi-Ouest

Area
  - Total: 332.26 km^{2} (128.29 sq mi)
  - Land: 308.13 km^{2} (118.97 sq mi)

Population (2021)
  - Total: 778
  - Density: 2.5/km^{2} (6.5/sq mi)
  - Pop (2016-21): ▲8.2%
  - Dwellings: 382
- Time zone: UTC−05:00 (EST)
  - Summer (DST): UTC−04:00 (EDT)
- Postal code(s): J0Y 1R0
- Area code: 819
- Highways: R-111
- Website: www.lacorne.ca

La Corne (French pronunciation: [la kɔʁn]) is a municipality in the Canadian province of Quebec in Abitibi Regional County Municipality.

The place is named in honour of Louis de La Corne (1703–1761), a French naval officer who was wounded in the Battle of Sainte-Foy in 1760. Until 1978, the place name was incorrectly spelled as Lacorne.

From 1955 to 1965, La Corne was home to Canada's only lithium mine. The underground mine had a 150 m (490 ft) deep shaft and lateral workings on three levels, and provided lithium to the glass and ceramics industries. With the advent of lithium batteries for electric cars and a myriad of consumer electronic products, the mine is currently being studied for reopening in late 2012 as an open-pit mine.

== History ==
The municipality of La Corne was founded in 1975 under the name Lacorne. The name was changed to the current La Corne in 1978.

== Demographics ==
Historical census populations – La Corne

| Year | Pop. | ±% |
|---|---|---|
| 1976 | 608 | — |
| 1981 | 631 | +3.8% |
| 1986 | 642 | +1.7% |
| 1991 | 616 | −4.0% |
| 1996 | 621 | +0.8% |

| Year | Pop. | ±% |
|---|---|---|
| 2001 | 629 | +1.3% |
| 2006 | 682 | +8.4% |
| 2011 | 700 | +2.6% |
| 2016 | 719 | +2.7% |
| 2021 | 778 | +8.2% |

Source: Statistics Canada

Private dwellings occupied by usual residents (2021): 322 (total dwellings: 382)

Mother tongue (2021):

- English as first language: 0.6%
- French as first language: 98.7%
- English and French as first language: 0%
- Other as first language: 0.6%

== Government ==
Municipal council (as of 2023):

- Mayor: Éric Comeau
- Councillors: Gaétan Goyette, André Gélinas, Samuel Vaillancourt, Yanick Hamel, André Beauchemin, Annie Grandmont

List of former mayors:

- Lionel Nadon (1975–1978)
- Adélard St-Pierre (1978–1979)
- Eloi Hamel (1979–1980)
- Jean Claude Trottier (1980–1983, 1985–1989)
- Yvon Vaillancourts (1983–1985, 1989–1996)
- Gérald St-Pierre (1996–1998)
- Yvon Vigneault (1998–2006)
- Michel Lévesque (2006–2013, 2021–2023)
- Éric Comeau (2013–2021, 2023–present)
