= Abitibi Regional County Municipality =

Abitibi
- Regional county municipality
- Coordinates: 48°34′N 78°00′W
- Country: Canada
- Province: Quebec
- Region: Abitibi-Témiscamingue
- Effective: January 1, 1983
- County seat: Amos

Government
  - Type: Prefecture
  - Prefect: Jacques Riopel

Area
  - Total: 7,862.70 km^{2} (3,035.81 sq mi)
  - Land: 7,677.01 km^{2} (2,964.11 sq mi)

Population (2016)
  - Total: 24,639
  - Density: 3.2/km^{2} (8.3/sq mi)
  - Change 2011-2016: ▲1.2%
  - Dwellings: 11,374
- Time zone: UTC−5 (EST)
  - Summer (DST): UTC−4 (EDT)
- Area code: 819
- Website: www.mrcabitibi.qc.ca

Abitibi Regional County Municipality (French pronunciation: [abitibi]) is a regional county municipality in the Abitibi-Témiscamingue region of Quebec. The seat is Amos.

== Subdivisions ==
There are 18 subdivisions within the RCM:

Cities & Towns (1)

- Amos

Municipalities (10)

- Barraute
- Berry
- Champneuf
- La Corne
- La Morandière-Rochebaucourt
- La Motte
- Preissac
- Saint-Dominique-du-Rosaire
- Saint-Mathieu-d'Harricana
- Sainte-Gertrude-Manneville

Townships (3)

- Landrienne
- Launay
- Trécesson

Parishes (1)

- Saint-Marc-de-Figuery

Unorganized Territory (2)

- Lac-Chicobi
- Lac-Despinassy

Indian Reserves (1)
(not associated with RCM)

- Pikogan

== Demographics ==
=== Population ===
Canada census – Abitibi community profile

	2021	2016	2011
Population	24,764 (+0.5% from 2016)	24,639 (+1.2% from 2011)	24,354 (+0.3% from 2006)
Land area	7,627.63 km^{2} (2,945.04 sq mi)	7,679.36 km^{2} (2,965.02 sq mi)	7,677.01 km^{2} (2,964.11 sq mi)
Population density	3.2/km^{2} (8.3/sq mi)	3.2/km^{2} (8.3/sq mi)	3.2/km^{2} (8.3/sq mi)
Median age	44 (M: 43.2, F: 44.4)	43.0 (M: 42.4, F: 43.7)	42.2 (M: 41.7, F: 42.7)
Private dwellings	11,784 (total) 10,941 (occupied)	11,374 (total)	11,109 (total)
Median household income	$76,000	$64,064	$54,465

References: 2021 2016 2011

Historical Census Data - Abitibi Regional County Municipality, Quebec

Year	Pop.	±%
1991	25,334	—
1996	25,280	−0.2%
2001	24,613	−2.6%

Year	Pop.	±%
2006	24,275	−1.4%
2011	24,354	+0.3%
2016	24,639	+1.2%

=== Language ===
Canada Census Mother Tongue - Abitibi Regional County Municipality, Quebec
Census	Total	French			English			French & English			Other		
Year	Responses	Count	Trend	Pop %	Count	Trend	Pop %	Count	Trend	Pop %	Count	Trend	Pop %
2016	24,400	23,690	▲1.4%	97.09%	235	▲9.3%	0.96%	70	0%	0.29%	405	▲8.0%	1.66%
2011	24,020	23,360	▲0.8%	97.25%	215	▼37.7%	0.90%	70	▲366.7%	0.29%	375	▼2.6%	1.56%
2006	23,915	23,170	▼1.9%	96.88%	345	▲53.3%	1.44%	15	▼75.0%	0.07%	385	▲4.1%	1.61%
2001	24,275	23,620	▼3.3%	97.30%	225	▼8.2%	0.93%	60	▲20.0%	0.25%	370	▲15.6%	1.52%
1996	25,050	24,435	n/a	97.54%	245	n/a	0.98%	50	n/a	0.20%	320	n/a	1.28%

== Transportation ==
=== Access Routes ===
Highways and numbered routes that run through the municipality, including external routes that start or finish at the county border:

- Autoroutes
  - None
- Principal Highways
  - R-109
  - R-111
- Secondary Highways
  - R-386
  - R-395
  - R-397
  - R-399
- External Routes
  - None

== Protected areas ==
- Aiguebelle National Park

== Attractions and other areas ==
- Alphonse-Normadin Covered Bridge [1950] (Saint-Dominique-du-Rosaire)
- Amos Airport (Trecesson)
- Exposition de la Maison de la culture Centre (Amos)
- Garde Dispensary (La Corne)
- Grazie Gadens (La Motte)
- l'Arche-de-Noe Covered Bridge [1937] (La Morandière-Rochebaucourt)
- l'Harricana Ferme d'autruches Slope (Saint-Mathieu-d'Harricana)
- l'Original Covered Bridge [1942] (La Morandière-Rochebaucourt)
- Mont-Video (Barraute)
- Pageau Refuge (Amos)
- Poste Museum (Saint-Marc-de-Figuery)

== See also ==
- List of regional county municipalities and equivalent territories in Quebec
