= Suzanne Blais =

Canadian politician

Member of the National Assembly of Quebec for Abitibi-Ouest
- In office October 1, 2018 – October 5, 2026
- Preceded by: François Gendron
- Succeeded by: Sébastien D'Astous

Personal details
- Born: Taschereau, Quebec
- Party: Coalition Avenir Québec

Suzanne Blais is a Canadian politician, an auxiliary nurse by training and a businesswoman, who was elected to the National Assembly of Quebec in the 2018 provincial election. She represented the electoral district of Abitibi-Ouest until 2026 as a member of the Coalition Avenir Québec.

== Electoral record ==
2022 Quebec general election: Abitibi-Ouest
Party	Candidate	Votes	%	±%
Coalition Avenir Québec	Suzanne Blais	10,399	46.75	+12.63
Parti Québécois	Samuel Doré	4,619	20.76	-12.50
Québec solidaire	Alexis Lapierre	3,623	16.29	-0.30
Conservative	François Vigneault	2,293	10.31	+9.21
Liberal	Guy Bourgeois	1,153	5.18	-6.13
Union Nationale	Jonathan Blanchette	159	0.71	–
Total valid votes		22,246	98.59	–
Total rejected ballots		319	1.41	–
Turnout		22,565	63.70	
Electors on the lists		35,424		

2018 Quebec general election: Abitibi-Ouest
Party	Candidate	Votes	%	±%
Coalition Avenir Québec	Suzanne Blais	7,680	34.12	+20.02
Parti Québécois	Sylvain Vachon	7,486	33.26	-8.94
Québec solidaire	Rose Marquis	3,735	16.59	+10.4
Liberal	Martin Veilleux	2,546	11.31	-8.94
Citoyens au pouvoir	Stéphane Lévesque	388	1.72	
Green	Yan-Dominic Couture	254	1.13	
Conservative	Eric Lacroix	248	1.1	
Independent	Maxim Sylvestre	172	0.76	
Total valid votes		22,509	98.37	
Total rejected ballots		372	1.63	
Turnout		22,881	64.75	
Eligible voters		35,339		
Coalition Avenir Québec gain from Parti Québécois		Swing		+14.48
Source(s) "Rapport des résultats officiels du scrutin". Élections Québec.
