= Shooting (disambiguation) =

Shooting is the act or process of firing of a projectile weapon.

Shooting may also refer to:

== Arts, entertainment, and media ==
- Shooting (bridge), an approach to bidding or play in the game of bridge
- Shooting (film), an aspect of filmmaking production
- Shooting game, a video game subgenre
- The Shooting (Digital Short), a 2007 video that appeared on Saturday Night Live
- "The Shooting", a nickname of "Episode 7" (Life on Mars, series 2)
- The Shooting, a 1966 American Western film

== Crime ==
- Mass shooting
- School shooting
- Shooting (crime)
- Shooting spree

== Sports ==
- Shooting (association football)
- Shooting sports
  - Hunting and shooting in the United Kingdom

== Other uses ==
- Shooting method, in mathematics, a means of solving differential equations
- Shooting up, a colloquialism for drug injection

== See also ==
- Chute (disambiguation)
- Shoot (disambiguation)
- Shooter (disambiguation)
- Shooting gallery (disambiguation)
- Shooting Star (disambiguation)
