= Shute =

Shute may refer to:

== Places ==
- Shute, Devon, village in East Devon, near Axminster
- Shute, Mid Devon, a location in Devon, England
- Shute Harbour, Australia
- Shute Park (Oregon), park in Hillsboro, Oregon

== People with the surname ==
- Attwood Shute, mayor of Philadelphia
- Sir Cameron Shute (1866–1936), British Army general
- Sir Charles Cameron Shute (1816–1904), British army general and Conservative Party politician
- David Shute, British journalist
- David Shute (born 1971), American Ice hockey player
- Denny Shute (1904–1974), American golfer
- Evan Shute (1905-1978), Canadian obstetrician, poet and writer
- Gareth Shute (born 1973), New Zealand author, musician and journalist
- Henry Shute (1856–1943), American lawyer
- Jackie Shute (1901–1988), Australian rugby union player
- Jenefer Shute, South African writer
- Jermaine Shute (born 1984), American rapper and businessman, better known as Starlito
- John Shute (architect) (died 1563), English artist and architect
- John Shute Barrington, 1st Viscount Barrington, born John Shute (1678–1734), English lawyer and theologian
- John W. Shute (1840–1922), American banker
- Sir John Shute (politician) (1873–1948), British army officer, businessman and conservative politician
- Josias Shute (1588–1643), English churchman
- Michael Shute (1951–2020), Canadian scholar
- Nerina Shute (1908–2004), British writer and journalist
- Nevil Shute, pen-name of Nevil Shute Norway (1899–1960), popular novelist and aeronautical engineer
- Percy George Shute (1894–1977), English malariologist and entomologist
- Phil Shute (born 1953), English footballer
- Richard Shute (1849–1886), British classicist and logician
- Robert Shute (died 1590), English judge and politician
- Robert Shute (died 1621), English lawyer and politician
- Samuel Shute (1662–1742), English military officer and royal governor of the provinces of Massachusetts and New Hampshire
- Samuel Addison Shute and Ruth Whittier Shute (1803–1836 and 1803–1882), American artists

== See also ==
- Shute Shield, rugby union competition in Sydney, New South Wales
- Chute (disambiguation)
- Shoot (disambiguation)
