= Bernetz =

Bernetz may refer to:

== Places ==
- Bernetz River, a river in Eeyou Istchee Baie-James, Quebec, Canada
- Lake Bernetz, a lake in the unorganized territory of Lac-Despinassy in Abitibi-Témiscamingue
- Lake Bernetz, a lake in the municipality of Lac-Bouchette in Saguenay-Lac-Saint-Jean

== People with the name ==
- Christian Berentz (1658–1722), also known as Cristiano Bernetz, German Baroque painter

== See also ==
- Battle of Bernetz Brook, a battle fought in 1758 between Britain and France
