= Memories Don't Die =

Studio album by Tory Lanez
- Released: March 2, 2018
- Studios: Camp David, Miami, FL; Tour Bus; Record Plant, Los Angeles, CA; Westlake, Los Angeles, CA; Matzah Ball Studios, New York, NY; 555, Los Angeles, CA; ShangriLoud, Vancouver, Canada
- Genres: Hip-hop; R&B; trap
- Length: 70:02
- Labels: Mad Love; Interscope
- Producers: Play Picasso; AraabMuzik; BobbyMadeTheBeat; C-Sick; Cashmere Cat; Christian Lou; TrvpVee; Dr. Zeuz; EC Fresco; Happy Perez; Lavish; Mansa; Nick Fouryn; OG Parker; Sean Myer; Sergio R.; Smash David; SkipOnDaBeat

Tory Lanez chronology
The New Toronto 2 (2017)	Memories Don't Die (2018)	Love Me Now? (2018)

Singles from Memories Don't Die
- 1. "Shooters" Released: September 22, 2017; 2. "Skrt Skrt" Released: September 28, 2017; 3. "Real Thing" Released: October 13, 2017

Memories Don't Die (stylized in all caps) is the second studio album by Canadian singer and rapper Tory Lanez. It was released on March 2, 2018, through Mad Love Records and Interscope Records. The production on the album was handled by multiple producers including OG Parker, Smash David, Play Picasso, AraabMuzik, Cashmere Cat, Happy Perez and C-Sick among others. The album also features guest appearances by Future, Nav, 50 Cent, Wiz Khalifa and Fabolous among others.

Memories Don't Die was supported by four singles: "Shooters", "Skrt Skrt" ,"Real Thing" and "Hypnotized". The album received generally mixed reviews from music critics but was a commercial success. The album debuted at number three on the US Billboard 200 chart, earning 54,000 album-equivalent units in its first week.

== Background and promotion ==
On June 14, 2017, Tory Lanez confirmed that his second album was "90% completed" via a tweet on Twitter.

The album's completion was announced by Lanez on August 2, 2017. On October 5, 2017, Lanez announced his second album's title.

On August 11, 2017, Lanez was featured in an interview with HotNewHipHop about his album's theme, by stating

"There's a lot of bars on this for sure, but it's not like full of rap. It's full of great music, like you know what I mean. But it's definitely not I Told You. This album will be something different for you to love in a different way and for you to cherish in a different way."

On February 9, 2018, Lanez unveiled the album's cover art and tracklist.

On January 1, 2017, Lanez released two mixtapes: Chixtape IV and The New Toronto 2 which were promoted as the prelude for his second album.

== Singles ==
Memories Don't Die was supported by four singles. The album's lead single, "Shooters" was released for streaming and digital download on September 22, 2017. A month later, the music video was released online. The single missed the Hot 100 but managed to peak at number 19 on the US Bubbling Under the Hot 100 chart. The song also peaked at number 68 on the Canadian Hot 100 chart. The album's second single, "Skrt Skrt" was released on September 28, 2017. The song also peaked at number 96 on the Canadian Hot 100 chart. The album's third single, "Real Thing" featuring Future was released on October 13, 2017. The song peaked at number 71 on the Canadian Hot 100 chart.

=== Promotional singles ===
The first promotional single, "I Sip" was released on November 16, 2017, shortly after premiering on Zane Lowe's Beats 1 radio. The song peaked at number 79 on the Canadian Hot 100 chart. The second promotional single, "B.I.D" was released on February 15, 2018, following the same roll-out as the former. The single missed the Hot 100 but managed to peak at number four on the US Bubbling Under the Hot 100 chart. The song also peaked at number 46 on the Canadian Hot 100 chart and number 85 on the UK Singles Chart respectively.

=== Other songs ===
On February 9, 2018, three tracks that were cut from the album – "March 2nd", "More Than Friends" and "Leaning", the latter two both featuring PartyNextDoor, was released by Lanez for his fans.

== Critical reception ==
Professional ratings
Aggregate scores
Source	Rating
Metacritic	46/100
Review scores
Source	Rating
AllMusic	2/5 stars
Exclaim!	6/10
The Guardian	1/5 stars
HotNewHipHop	87%
Pitchfork	5.5/10

Memories Don't Die received mixed reviews from critics. At Metacritic, which assigns a normalized rating out of 100 to reviews from mainstream critics, Memories Don't Die received an average score of 46 based on five reviews, indicating "mixed or average reviews". Kassandra Guagliardi of Exclaim! concluded that the album has "a few quality tracks, but overall it misses the mark on classic appeal." In a scathing negative review, Ben Beaumont-Thomas of The Guardian described the album as an "astonishingly hackneyed, aggressively chameleonic LP", while comparing the album to the work of Lanez's contemporaries: "As Migos or 2 Chainz ably demonstrate, rapping about racks and whips isn’t necessarily dull, but you need to have wit, nimble hooks and idiosyncratic flow, none of which Lanez possesses. He’s so profoundly unoriginal you start to wonder if he is actually a rudimentary Spotify AI project who has been fed the RapCaviar playlist and given an edgy beard. But Lanez ultimately doesn’t pass the Turing test, and his jack-of-all-trades versatility leaves him the master of none."

Sheldon Pearce of Pitchfork commented that Memories Don't Die is "a record full of crude imitations of every remotely bankable contemporary R&B or rap song", criticising the originality of the album: "Nearly everything he raps on Memories Don’t Die is something you’ve heard before, performed more ably elsewhere, and the few lines that aren’t are unbelievably simple-minded or straight-up witless."

== Commercial performance ==
In his home country of Canada, Memories Don't Die debuted at number one on the Canadian Albums Chart, earning 8,000 album-equivalent units in its first week. This became Tory Lanez's first number one debut in Canada. In the United States, Memories Don't Die debuted at number three on the US Billboard 200 chart, earning 54,000 album-equivalent units (including 15,000 copies as pure album sales) in its first week of release. This became Tory Lanez's second US top-ten debut on the chart. The album also accumulated a total of 54 million on-demand audio streams for the set's tracks that week. In its second week, the album dropped to number 16 on the chart, earning an additional 23,000 units.

== Track listing ==
Credits adapted from the album's liner notes and Tidal.

Memories Don't Die
No.	Title	Writer(s)	Producer(s)	Length
1.	"Memories"	Daystar Peterson; Daniel Gonzalez	Play Picasso	0:28
2.	"Old Friends x New Foes"	Peterson; Gonzalez; Carl Caruso	Play Picasso; Lavish Rj Beatz	3:27
3.	"Shooters"	Peterson; Charles Dumazer	C-Sick	3:28
4.	"4 Me"	Peterson; Nathan Perez; Gonzalez	Happy Perez; Play Picasso	3:48
5.	"Skrt Skrt"	Peterson; Gonzalez; Jesus Bobe; Wallace Jefferson; Ernesto Cornejo; Karen Chin; Anthony Kelly	Play Picasso; Dr. Zeuz	2:53
6.	"Benevolent"	Peterson; Gonzalez; Caruso; Cornejo; Douglas Gibbs; Ralph Johnson	Play Picasso; Lavish; EC Fresco	3:46
7.	"Real Thing" (featuring Future)	Peterson; Nayvadius Wilburn; Dumazer	C-Sick	4:03
8.	"Hate to Say"	Peterson; Gonzalez; Maurice Griffin; Robert Williams; Julian Bunetta; John Ryan; Jamie Scott	Play Picasso; Christian Lou; BobbyMadeTheBeat	4:09
9.	"B.I.D"	Peterson; Samuel Jimenez; Joshua Parker	Smash David; OG Parker	2:44
10.	"48 Floors" (featuring Mansa)	Peterson; Mansa Evans; Gonzalez	Mansa; Play Picasso	3:43
11.	"B.B.W.W x Fake Show"	Peterson; Edgar Ferrera; Gonzalez; Larry Cooper, Jr.	Play Picasso; EC Fresco; SkipOnDaBeat	4:11
12.	"Dance for Me" (featuring Nav)	Peterson; Navraj Goraya; Amir Esmailian; Sergio Romero; Gonzalez	Sergio R.; Play Picasso	5:25
13.	"Pieces" (featuring 50 Cent)	Peterson; Curtis Jackson; Gonzalez; Gordon Sumner; Dominic Miller	Play Picasso	5:48
14.	"Connection" (featuring Fabolous, Davo and Paloma Ford)	Peterson; John Jackson; Nicolas Baker; Paloma Ford; Jimenez; David Kerr	Smash David; Nick Fouryn	3:56
15.	"Hillside" (featuring Wiz Khalifa and Mansa)	Peterson; Cameron Thomaz; Evans; Gonzalez	Mansa; Play Picasso	3:29
16.	"Hypnotized"	Peterson; Benjamin Levin; Magnus Høiberg; Perez; Kennedi Lykken; Sean Myer	Benny Blanco; Cashmere Cat; Sean Myer; Happy Perez^{[a]}	3:11
17.	"Happiness x Tell Me"	Peterson; Romero; Gonzalez	Sergio R.; Play Picasso	7:59
18.	"Don't Die"	Peterson; Abraham Orellana	AraabMuzik	3:34
Total length:				70:02

Notes

- ^{^[a]} signifies a co-producer
- "Memories" and "Don't Die" are stylized in uppercase letters. For example, "Memories" is stylized as "MEMORIES".
- "Hypnotized" features background vocals by Kennedi Lykken

Sample credits

- "Skrt Skrt" contains interpolations from "Dat Sexy Body", written by Karen Chin and Anthony Kelly.
- "Benevolent" contains excerpts from "Sounds Like a Love Song", written by Douglas Gibbs and Ralph Johnson, as performed by Bobby Glenn.
- "Hate to Say" contains excerpts and a sample from "You & I", written by Julian Bunetta, John Ryan and Jamie Scott, as performed by One Direction.
- "Pieces" contains portions and a sample from "Shape of My Heart", written by Gordon Sumner and Dominic Miller, as performed by Sting.

== Personnel ==
Credits adapted from the album's liner notes and Tidal.

Musicians

- Daniel Gonzalez – instrumentation (tracks 1, 2, 4, 5, 6, 8, 11–13, 15, 17), programming (tracks 1, 2, 4, 6, 8, 11–13, 15, 17)
- Daystar Peterson – instrumentation (tracks 1, 2, 8, 10, 11, 13, 17), programming (tracks 1, 2, 8, 10, 11, 13, 17)
- Carl Caruso – instrumentation (tracks 2, 6), programming (tracks 2, 6)
- Charles Dumazer – instrumentation (tracks 3, 7), programming (tracks 3, 7)
- Happy Perez – instrumentation (tracks 4, 16), programming (tracks 4, 16), guitar (tracks 4, 16)
- Mansa Evans – instrumentation (tracks 4, 10, 15), programming (tracks 4, 10, 15)
- Dr. Zeuz – instrumentation (track 5)
- Wallace Jefferson – instrumentation (track 5)
- Christian Lou – instrumentation (track 8), programming (track 8)
- BobbyMadeTheBeat – instrumentation (track 8), programming (track 8)
- Sebastian Rompotis – instrumentation (tracks 8, 13), programming (tracks 8, 13)
- Smash David – instrumentation (tracks 9, 14), programming (tracks 9, 14)
- OG Parker – instrumentation (track 9), programming (track 9)
- Edgar Ferrera – instrumentation (track 11), programming (track 11)
- Larry Cooper Jr. – instrumentation (track 11), programming (track 11)
- Sergio Romero – instrumentation (tracks 11, 17), programming (tracks 11, 17)
- Nick Fouryn – instrumentation (track 14), programming (track 14)
- Benny Blanco – instrumentation (track 16), programming (track 16), keyboards (track 16)
- Cashmere Cat – instrumentation (track 16), programming (track 16), keyboards (track 16)
- Sean Myer – instrumentation (track 16), programming (track 16), keyboards (track 16)
- Danny Morris – instrumentation (track 17), programming (track 17)
- Abraham Orellana – instrumentation (track 18), programming (track 18)

Technical

- Johann Chavez – mixing (tracks 1–15, 17, 18), engineering (tracks 1–7, 9, 11–15, 17, 18)
- Daniel Gonzalez – mixing (tracks 1, 2, 4–15, 17, 18), engineering (tracks 1, 2, 4–6, 12, 13, 15, 17, 18)
- Raymond Martinez – engineering assistance (tracks 1–6, 8–11, 13–15, 17, 18)
- Lucas "Lowkis" Rompotis – mixing assistance (tracks 1–15, 17, 18), engineering assistant (tracks 5, 9, 11, 14, 17)
- Chris Gehringer – mastering (all tracks)
- Will Quinnell – mastering (tracks 1, 2, 4, 6, 8–18)
- Jordan "Trouble" Bacchus – engineering (track 12)
- David Schwerkolt – engineering assistance (tracks 12, 16)
- Mark "Spike" Stent – mixing (track 16)
- Michael Freeman – mixing assistance (track 16)
- Geoff Swan – mixing assistance (track 16)

Production

- Andrew Luftman – production coordination (tracks 1–15, 17, 18)
- Seif Hussain – production coordination (tracks 1–15, 17, 18)
- Astrid Taylor – production coordination (all tracks)
- Sarah Shelton – production coordination (all tracks)
- Sascha Stone Guttfreund – production coordination (tracks 1–15, 17, 18)
- Philip Payne – production coordination (tracks 1–15, 17, 18)
- Troy Dubrowsky – production coordination (tracks 1–15, 17, 18)
- Raymond Martinez – production coordination (tracks 1–15, 17, 18)
- Soffia Yen – production coordination (track 16)

Additional personnel

- Troy Dubrowsky – coordinator
- Joshua "Mid Jordan" Farias – creative director

== Charts ==
=== Weekly charts ===
Chart (2018)	Peak position
Australian Urban Albums (ARIA)	34
Belgian Albums (Ultratop Flanders)	30
Belgian Albums (Ultratop Wallonia)	93
Canadian Albums (Billboard)	1
Dutch Albums (Album Top 100)	7
German Albums (Offizielle Top 100)	53
Irish Albums (IRMA)	31
New Zealand Albums (RMNZ)	31
Norwegian Albums (VG-lista)	20
Swedish Albums (Sverigetopplistan)	28
Swiss Albums (Schweizer Hitparade)	28
UK Albums (Official Charts)	8
US Billboard 200	3
US Top R&B/Hip-Hop Albums (Billboard)	2

=== Year-end charts ===
Chart (2018)	Position
US Billboard 200	200
US Top R&B/Hip-Hop Albums (Billboard)	80
