= Alana Monteiro =

American model, actress, singer-songwriter, and dancer

- Born: 13 March 1997 (age 29); New Bedford, Massachusetts, US
- Occupations: Model, actress, singer, songwriter
- Years active: 2015–present
- Modelling information
- Height: 5 ft 9 in (176 cm)
- Hair colour: Brown
- Eye colour: Brown
- Agency: Wilhelmina Models, Next Model Management

Alana Pascale Monteiro (born March 13, 1997, in New Bedford, Massachusetts) is an American model, actress, singer-songwriter, and dancer based in New York City. She has appeared in fashion publications, acted in films including Someone Great and Hocus Pocus 2, and released singles such as “High,” “Ghosting,” and “Miss No More.”

== Modeling career ==
In 2015, during her senior year of high school, Monteiro began her modeling career. Upon graduation, she moved to New York City and signed with major modeling agencies, including Wilhelmina Models and Next Model Management, as well as agencies in Europe (London, Denmark, Germany). Over time, in the 2020s, she became ranked in the Top 50 Social on Models.com (peaking at #41). She is also included in Models.com’s rankings of the Top 100 Black female models, alongside models such as Naomi Campbell and Tyra Banks.

Monteiro has appeared on over thirty covers and editorials in fashion magazines such as Vogue, Harper’s Bazaar, Elle, Marie Claire, L’Officiel, Numéro, Glamour, and Grazia. She has worked with top beauty brands including CoverGirl, Clinique, L’Oréal Paris, MAC Cosmetics, Revlon, Bobbi Brown Cosmetics, bareMinerals, and NARS. Her print advertisement campaigns for global brands such as Nike, Reebok, Under Armour, Footlocker, Gap, TJ Maxx, Marshalls, Macy’s, Puma, Target, and Fila have been featured across thousands of stores worldwide and on billboards in Times Square, New York City. Monteiro has walked in fashion shows for designers like Rebecca Minkoff, Diane von Furstenberg, and Vivienne Hu at New York Fashion Week and Miami Swim Week.

== Acting career ==
After relocating to New York City, Monteiro studied acting at institutions such as the Stella Adler Studio and New York Film Academy. Her filmography includes appearances in Someone Great (Netflix), Second Act, and Disney’s Hocus Pocus 2, which won three Emmy Awards. In Hocus Pocus 2 (2022), she appeared as an extra in a Newport festival scene, wearing a costume inspired by her mother’s vintage Halloween outfit.

== Music career ==
Monteiro released her debut single "High" in June 2021. She wrote the song herself, and it was recorded in a New York studio.

On October 30, 2021, she released "Ghosting", a soulful R&B ballad she also wrote. The track appeared on global Spotify playlists in Europe, Germany, France, Singapore, Mexico, and the U.S., with some playlists exceeding 100 million streams. It charted on the Billboard charts, ranking among the top.

In March 2024, she released the R&B breakup-themed single "Miss No More", which she wrote herself.

== Community work ==
In May 2025, Monteiro launched the Alana Monteiro Modeling Camp in New Bedford. The five-day workshop offers modeling coaching, runway training, professional headshots, acting and dance classes, and Q&A sessions for aspiring models.

== Filmography ==
Year	Title	Role	Notes
2026	Remain	Driver	In production
2026	REAL	Mindy	Pre-production
2024	Salem’s Lot	Roxy Teen Drive-in Employee	Uncredited
2024	The Perfect Couple	Party Guest	TV series, 1 episode, uncredited
2024	Madame Web	Opera Guest	Uncredited
2024	High	Self	Music video
2023	Good Burger 2	Concert Fan	Uncredited
2022	Whitney Houston: I Wanna Dance with Somebody	Girl	Uncredited
2022	Hocus Pocus 2	Townsperson	Uncredited
2019	She’s Gotta Have It	Girl	TV series, 1 episode, uncredited
2019	Someone Great	Girl	Uncredited
2018	#Fashionvictim	Girl	TV movie, uncredited
2018	Second Act	Model	Uncredited
2018	Ray Donovan	Girl	TV series, 1 episode, uncredited
2018	Slender Man	Girl	Uncredited
2018	Orange Is the New Black	Model	TV series, 1 episode, uncredited
2018	Power	Model	TV series, 1 episode, uncredited
2018	Law & Order: Special Victims Unit	Model	TV series, 1 episode, uncredited
2018	I Feel Pretty	Model	Uncredited
2017	Daddy’s Home 2	Airport Attendee	Uncredited
2017	Younger	Girl	TV series, 1 episode, uncredited
