= Chute =

Chute or Chutes, may refer to:

- Chute (gravity), a channel down which falling materials are guided
- Chute (landform), a steep-sided passage through which water flows rapidly
- Escape chute, an emergency exit utilized where conventional fire escapes are impractical
- Mail chute, a letter collection device
- Parachute, a device used to slow the motion of an object through an atmosphere by creating drag

== People ==
- Chute (surname)

== Places ==
- Chute, Wiltshire, a parish in England, United Kingdom
- Chute River, a short river in Maine, United States
- Chute, Victoria, a locality in Australia
- Rivière des Chutes (Batiscan River tributary) (French: Chutes River; Falls River), a river in Mauricie, Quebec, Canada

== Facilities and structures ==
- Pont des Chutes (French: Chutes Bridge; Falls Bridge), a covered bridge in Abitibi-Témiscamingue, Quebec, Canada
- École secondaire des Chutes (disambiguation) (French: Chutes Secondary School; Falls Secondary); highschools

== Television ==
- Chute! (television programme), a children's programme
- "The Chute", a 1996 episode in the third season of Star Trek: Voyager

== Other uses ==
- Chutes and ladders
- Pilot chute, a small auxiliary parachute used to deploy a main parachute
- Chute (racecourse), a projection extending from either end of an oval-shaped racecourse
- Squeeze chute, a cage for restraining a farm animal
- Chute (in North America), a cattle race, a channel for handling and sorting farm animals

== See also ==
- Shoot (disambiguation)
- Shute (disambiguation)
- Deschutes (disambiguation)
