= Snipes =

Snipes may refer to:

- Snipe, a wading bird
- Snipes (surname)
- Snipes (film), a 2001 film
- Snipes (video game), a 1983 text-mode networked computer game
- Snipes Mountain AVA, a wine region in Washington State
- SNIPES, a German footwear and streetwear retailer owned by Deichmann SE

== See also ==
- Snipe (disambiguation)
- Sniper (disambiguation)
