= Rochebaucourt =

- Former municipality
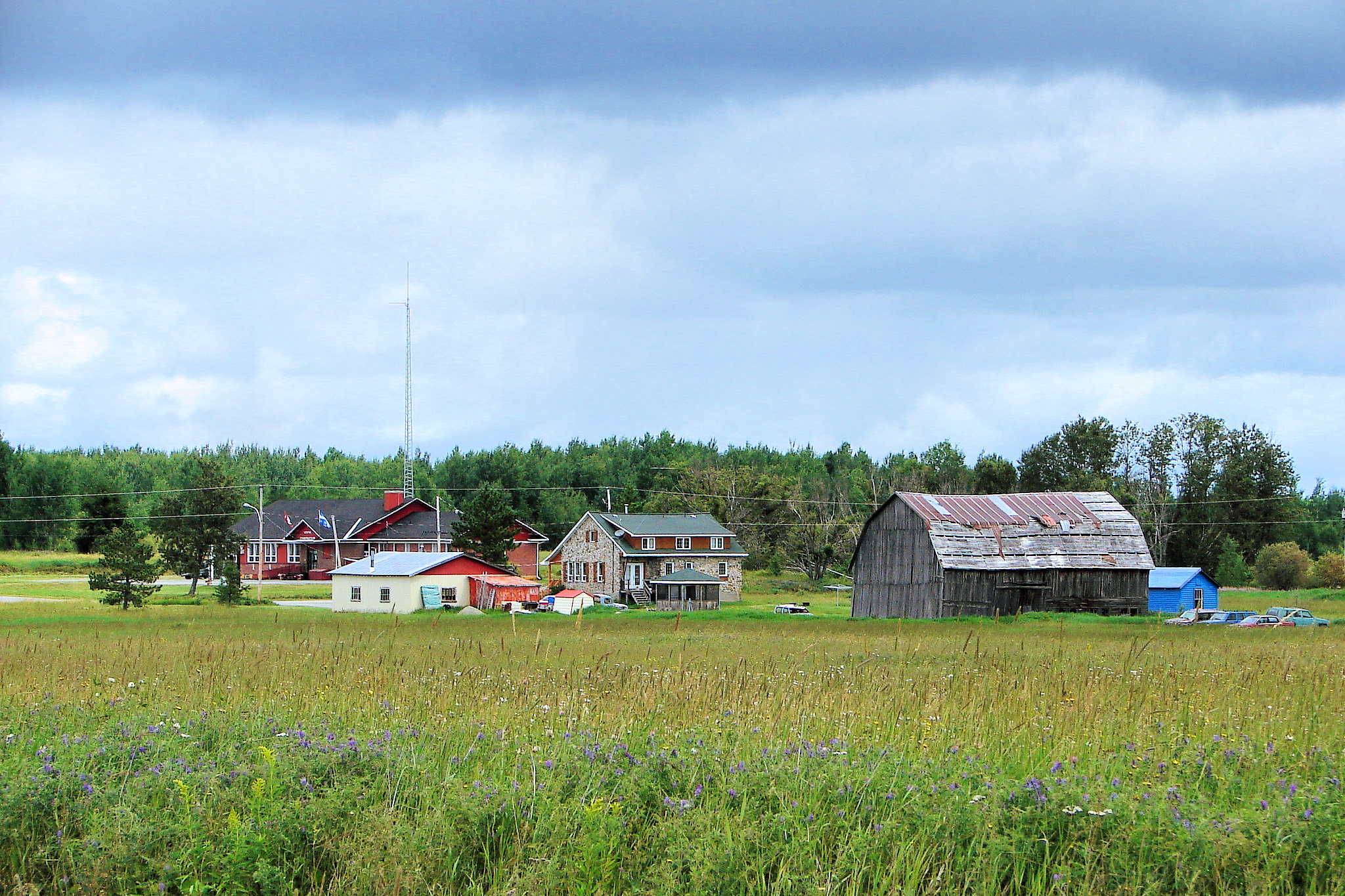

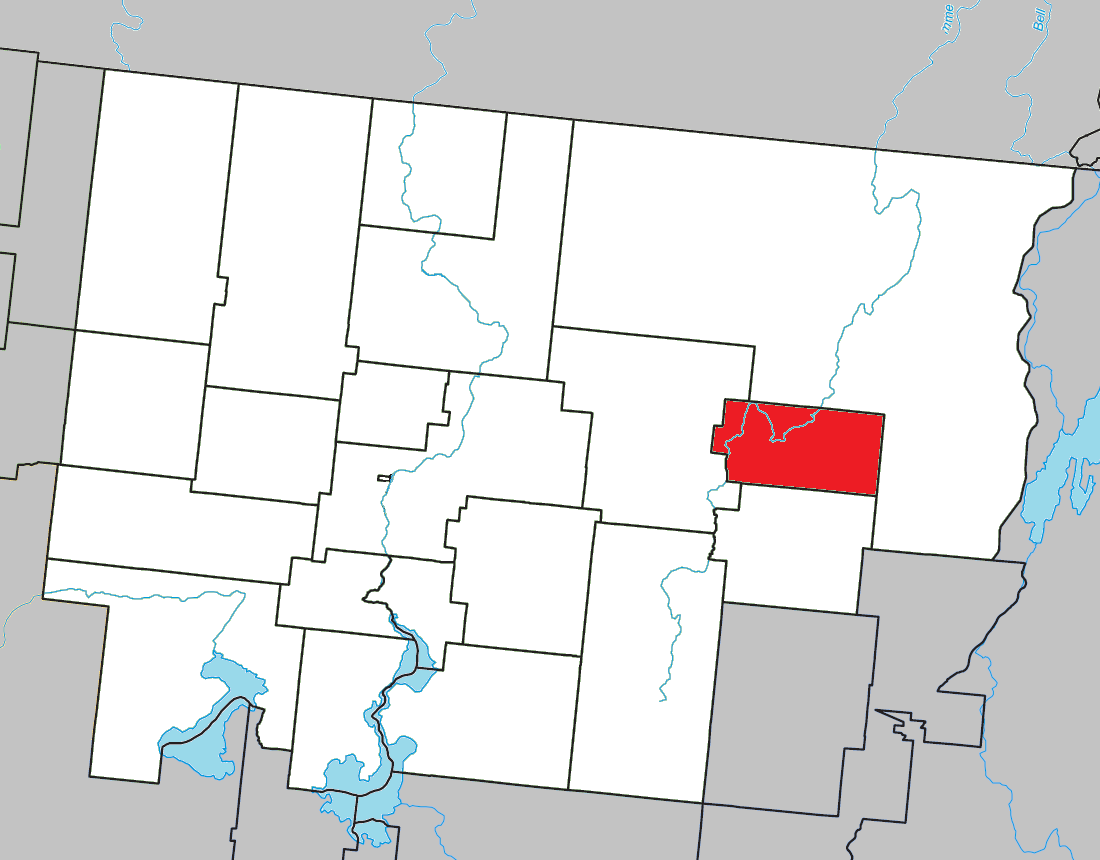
- Location within Abitibi RCM

- Location in western Quebec
- Coordinates: 48°41′N 77°30′W
- Country: Canada
- Province: Quebec
- Region: Abitibi-Témiscamingue
- RCM: Abitibi
- Municipality: La Morandière-Rochebaucourt
- Settled: 1935
- Constituted: January 1, 1983
- Dissolved: January 1, 2023

Government
  - Federal riding: Abitibi—Témiscamingue
  - Prov. riding: Abitibi-Ouest

Area
  - Total: 183.30 km^{2} (70.77 sq mi)
  - Land: 183.63 km^{2} (70.90 sq mi)
- There is an apparent contradiction between two authoritative sources

Population (2021)
  - Total: 146
  - Density: 0.8/km^{2} (2.1/sq mi)
  - Pop (2016-21): ▲11.5%
  - Dwellings: 70
- Time zone: UTC−05:00 (EST)
  - Summer (DST): UTC−04:00 (EDT)
- Postal code(s): J0Y 2J0
- Area code: 819
- Highways: R-395 R-397

Rochebaucourt (French pronunciation: [ʁɔʃbokuʁ]) is a former municipality in the Canadian province of Quebec, located in the Abitibi Regional County Municipality. In 2023, it was merged with La Morandière to form the new Municipality of La Morandière-Rochebaucourt.

== History ==
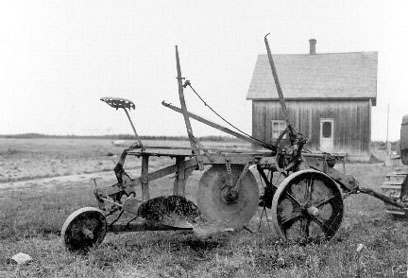
Rochebaucourt in September 1942

In 1935 as part of the Vautrin Settlement Plan, the place was colonized by pioneers from Saint-Antoine-sur-Richelieu, Saint-Hyacinthe, and Salaberry-de-Valleyfield. It was first known as Colonie-33 but this was quickly replaced by Rochebaucourt, the name of the geographic township in which it is located. La Rochebaucourt was a cavalry captain of the Régiment de Languedoc in General Montcalm's army. In 1940, the Parish of Saint-Antoine-de-Rochebaucourt was established.

Not until 1983 was the place incorporated as a municipality.

== Demographics ==
Historical Census Data - Rochebaucourt, Quebec

Year	Pop.	±%
1986	303	—
1991	243	−19.8%
1996	227	−6.6%
2001	215	−5.3%

Year	Pop.	±%
2006	177	−17.7%
2011	161	−9.0%
2016	131	−18.6%
2021	146	+11.5%

Source: Statistics Canada

Mother tongue (2021):

- English as first language: 0%
- French as first language: 100%
- English and French as first language: 0%
- Other as first language: 0%

== Local government ==
List of former mayors:

- Madeleine Richard (1983–1987)
- Édouard Anctil (1987–1991)
- Georges Lafrenière (1991–1993)
- Francine Vallières (1993–1997)
- Alain Trudel (1997–1999, 2021–2022)
- Daniel Lalancette (1999–2009)
- Gaby Chiasson-Yergeau (2009–2013)
- Marc-Antoine Pelletier (2013–2021)

=== Political representation ===
Rochebaucourt federal election results
Year	Liberal		Conservative		Bloc Québécois		New Democratic		Green	
2021	12%	7	16%	10	57%	37	3%	2	5%	3
2019	7%	6	36%	29	54%	44	0%	0	3%	2

Rochebaucourt provincial election results
Year	CAQ		Liberal		QC solidaire		Parti Québécois	
2018	47%	34	0%	0	10%	7	40%	29
2014	13%	11	12%	10	8%	6	67%	54

Provincially it is part of the riding of Abitibi-Ouest. In the 2022 Quebec general election the incumbent MNA Suzanne Blais, of the Coalition Avenir Québec, was re-elected to represent the population of Rochebaucourt in the National Assembly of Quebec.

Federally, Rochebaucourt is part of the federal riding of Abitibi—Témiscamingue. In the 2021 Canadian federal election, the incumbent Sébastien Lemire of the Bloc Québécois was re-elected to represent the population Rochebaucourt in the House of Commons of Canada.
