= River Falls =

River Falls may refer to:

== United States ==
- River Falls, Alabama
- River Falls Township, Minnesota
- River Falls, Wisconsin, the most populous place with the name
- River Falls (town), Wisconsin

== See also ==
- Thief River Falls, Minnesota
- Black River Falls, Wisconsin
- Deschutes River (disambiguation)
