= Shot =

Shot may refer to:

== Arts, entertainment, and media ==
- Shot (album), by The Jesus Lizard
- Shot, Illusion, New God, an EP by Gruntruck
- Shot Rev 2.0, a video album by The Sisters of Mercy
- "Shot" (song), by The Rasmus
- Shot (2017 film), an American film starring Noah Wyle
- Shot (filmmaking), a part of a film between two cuts

== Organizations ==
- Serious Hazards of Transfusion, or SHOT, an organisation monitoring blood transfusion errors in the UK
- Society for the History of Technology, or SHOT, a professional organization for historians of technology

== Sports ==
- Shot (ice hockey), an attempt to score a goal or points
- Home run, or shot in baseball slang
- Shot put, an event in track and field athletics
- SHOT Show (Shooting, Hunting, and Outdoor Trade Show), an annual trade show for the shooting, hunting, and firearms industry
- Cricket shots, ways of hitting the ball to score in cricket

== Weaponry and ballistics ==
- Shot (pellet), small balls of metal generally used as shotgun projectiles, or as weights
- Armor-piercing shot and shell, an artillery shell
- Buckshot, a type of shotgun projectiles
- Gunshot, discharge of a firearm
- Round shot, a spherical solid metal projectile
- Sho't, main battle tank

== Other uses ==
- Injection (medicine)
- Shot (drink), a mixed alcoholic drink
- Shot glass, a glass used typically for small portions alcohol.
- Shot silk, a type of silk
- Showt or Shoţ, a city in Iran
- Shot, a fifteen fathom line length of anchor chain
- Shot, a group of adjacent strips or furlongs in the medieval open field system

== See also ==
- Snapshot (photography)
- The Shot (disambiguation)
- Moonshot (disambiguation), a rocket launch to the moon
- Shots (disambiguation)
- Shoot (disambiguation)
- Shooter (disambiguation)
- Shooting (association football), a kicking technique in association football
- Shooting, the act of firing a projectile weapon or device
