= Chute (surname) =

Chute is a surname, and may refer to:

- Anthony Chute (fl. 1590s–1595), Elizabethan poet and pamphleteer
- B. J. Chute (1913–1987), American writer and academic
- Carolyn Chute (born 1947), American writer and activist
- Chaloner Chute (died 1659), English lawyer and Speaker of the House of Commons
- Chaloner Chute (died 1666) (1632–1666), English lawyer and politician
- Charles Chute (1879–1956), English barrister, landowner, and politician
- Christopher G. Chute (born 1955), American biomedical informatics researcher
- Desmond Chute (1895–1962), English poet, artist and Catholic priest
- Harris H. Chute (c. 1823 – 1892), merchant and political figure in Nova Scotia
- Hillary Chute (born 1976), American academic
- Marchette Chute (1909–1994), American biographer
- Philip Chute (1506–1567), English Member of Parliament
- Trevor Chute (1816–1886), Irish army officer
