= La Morandière =

- Former municipality
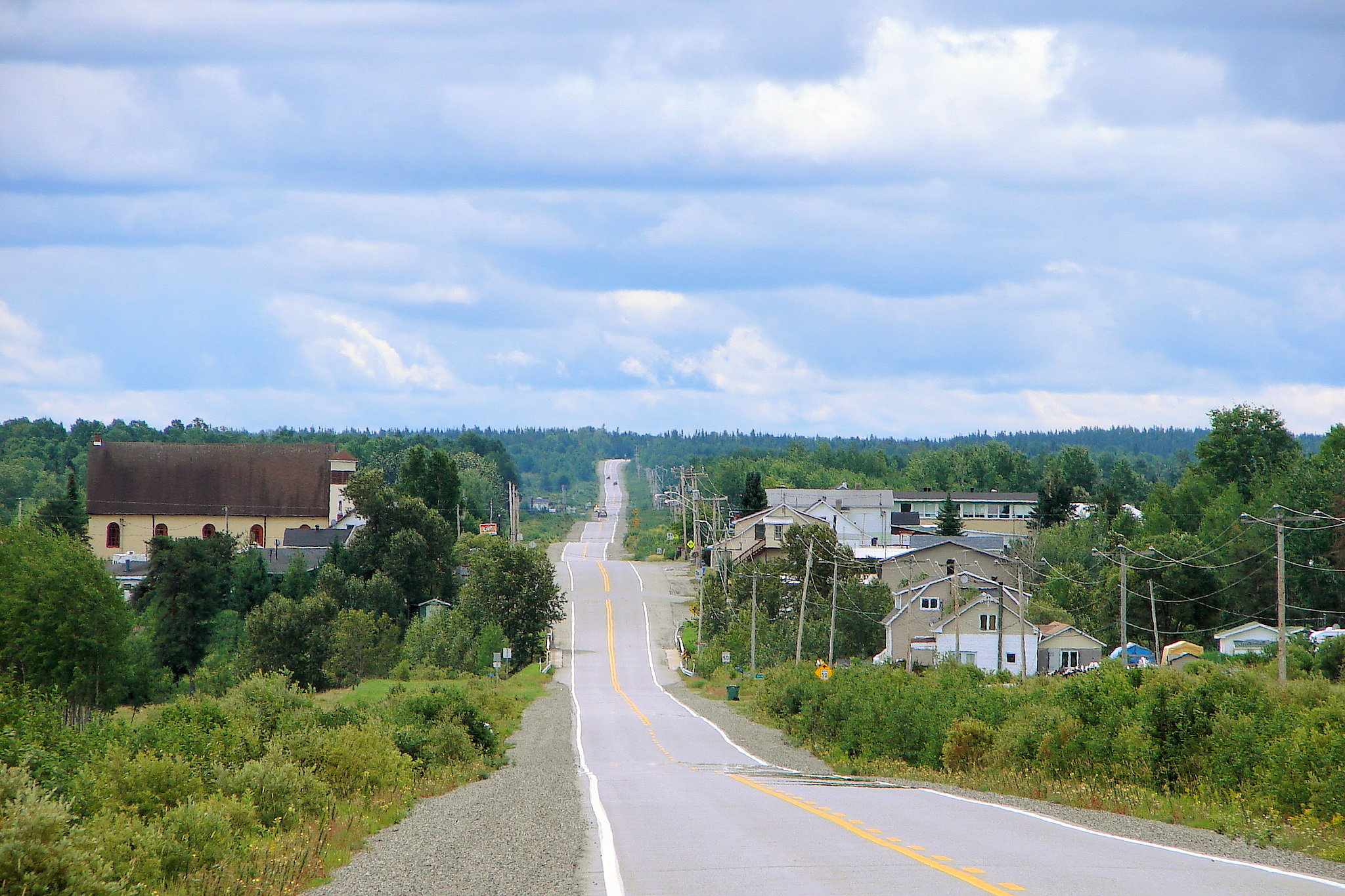

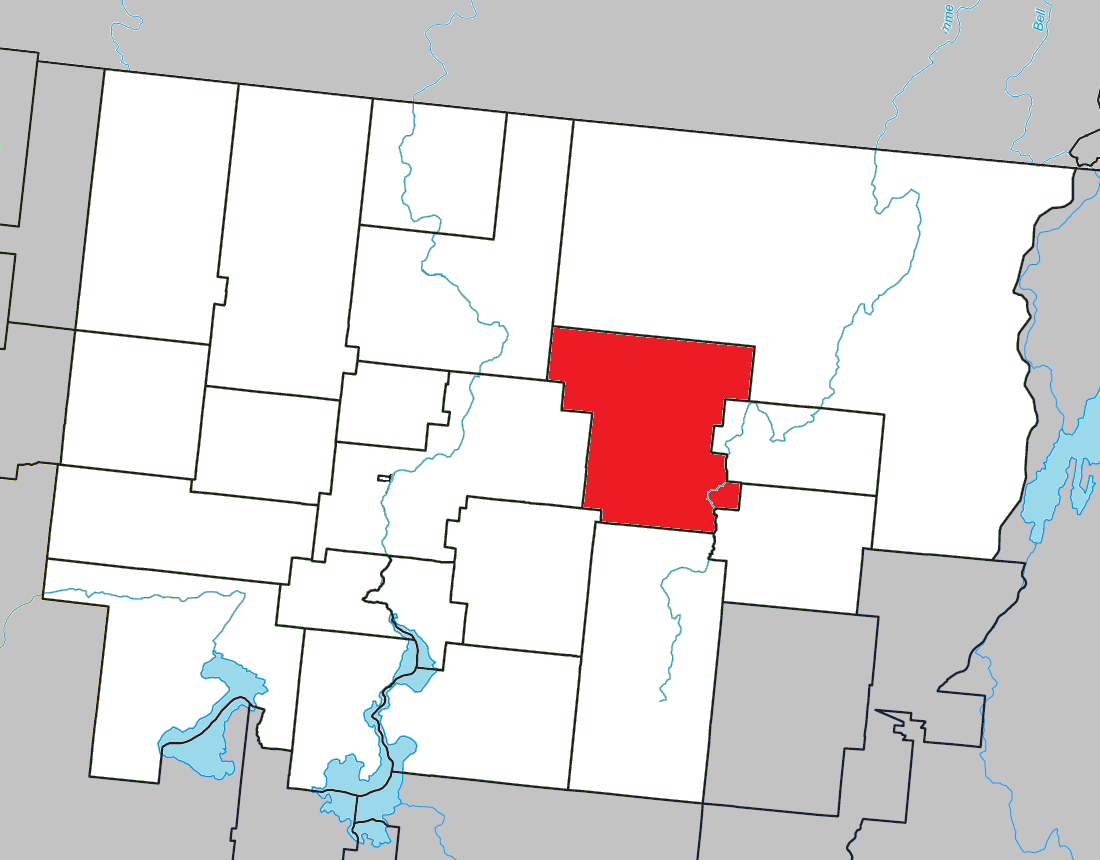
- Location within Abitibi RCM

- Location in western Quebec
- Coordinates: 48°37′N 77°38′W
- Country: Canada
- Province: Quebec
- Region: Abitibi-Témiscamingue
- RCM: Abitibi
- Municipality: La Morandière-Rochebaucourt
- Settled: ca. 1916
- Constituted: January 1, 1983
- Dissolved: January 1, 2023

Government
  - Federal riding: Abitibi—Témiscamingue
  - Prov. riding: Abitibi-Ouest

Area
  - Total: 421.70 km^{2} (162.82 sq mi)
  - Land: 407.35 km^{2} (157.28 sq mi)

Population (2021)
  - Total: 205
  - Density: 0.5/km^{2} (1.3/sq mi)
  - Pop (2016-21): ▼1.0%
  - Dwellings: 111
- Time zone: UTC−05:00 (EST)
  - Summer (DST): UTC−04:00 (EDT)
- Postal code(s): J0Y 1S0
- Area code: 819
- Highways: R-395; R-397
- Website: www.lamorandiere.ca

La Morandière (French pronunciation: [la mɔʁɑ̃djɛʁ]) is a former municipality in the Canadian province of Quebec, located in the Abitibi Regional County Municipality. In 2023, it merged with Rochebaucourt to form the new municipality of La Morandière-Rochebaucourt.

== History ==
The location where La Morandière currently sits was initially settled in around 1916 by Émilien Plante, Uldéric Hardy and Charles Rochette, but the territory didn't have any official status until January 1, 1983, the date when the municipality of La Morandière was founded.

== Demographics ==
Historical census populations – La Morandière
Year	Pop.	±%
1986	357	—
1991	327	−8.4%
1996	295	−9.8%
2001	291	−1.4%
2006	262	−10.0%
2011	233	−11.1%
2016	207	−11.2%
2021	205	−1.0%
Source: Statistics Canada

Mother tongue (2021):

- English as first language: 0%
- French as first language: 97.6%
- English and French as first language: 0%
- Other as first language: 2.4%

== Local government ==
List of former mayors:

- Marcel Lebrun (1983–1989)
- Thérèse Parent-Hébert (1989–1997)
- Marcel Lesyk (1997–2001)
- Micheline Bureau (2005–2009)
- Guy Lemire (2009–2017)
- Alain Lemay (2017–2022)
