= The Shot =

The Shot may refer to:

== Basketball ==
- The Shot (Bulls–Cavaliers), by Michael Jordan during Game 5 of the 1989 NBA Eastern Conference First Round
- The Shot (Duke–Kentucky), by Christian Laettner of Duke during the Elite Eight of the 1992 NCAA Tournament against Kentucky
- The Shot (Ole Miss–Valparaiso), by Bryce Drew of Valparaiso during the first round of the 1998 NCAA Tournament against Mississippi
- The Shot, Ray Allen's game-tying shot in Game 6 of the 2013 NBA Finals

== Television ==
- The Shot (TV series), an American reality competition show
- "The Shot" (BoJack Horseman), a television episode
- "The Shot" (Rugrats), a television episode

== Other uses ==
- "The Shot" (Pushkin), an 1831 short story by Aleksandr Pushkin
- The Shot (film), a 1969 Swedish film
- The Shot, a 2003 short film by Puven Pather
- The Shot, backing group for Graham Parker on his 1985 album Steady Nerves

== See also ==
- Shot (disambiguation)
- Shot heard round the world, a phrase referring to several historical incidents
- Shoot (disambiguation)
