= Snip =

Snip may refer to:

== Entertainment and games ==
- The Snip (album), a 2002 jazz album
- Snip-snap-snorum, a children's card game

== Horses ==
- Snip (horse), a racehorse
- Snip (Horse markings): a white marking on the muzzle, between the nostrils of a horse or pony.

== Science and technology ==
- Scotland-Northern Ireland pipeline, a natural gas interconnector
- Snip (aircraft), a Dutch aircraft made in the 1930s
- The snip, a minor surgical procedure
- Tin snip, a tool used to cut thin sheet metal
- Single-nucleotide polymorphism, SNP, pronounced snip
- Source normalized impact per paper (abbreviated SNIP), a metric of the quality and impact of an academic journal

== In fiction ==
- Snip (Modern Family), an episode of Modern Family
- SNIP, a fictional robot in the television series Snorks
- Snip (puppet), a fictional character in the television series Ace Lightning
- Snip (TV series), a 1976 comedy television series

== Other ==
- The Snip, a lake in the United States
- William Snip (1932–2009), Canadian professional wrestler
- A small eel, especially in the nursery rhyme "What Are Little Boys Made Of?" ("Snips, snails and puppy-dogs' tails")
- Single-nucleotide polymorphism, in genetics and bioinformatics: initialism 'SNP' is pronounced 'snip'

== See also ==
- Snipe (disambiguation)
- Snipper, another term for a strimmer for cutting grass etc.
- Snipping, for screenshots in Microsoft Windows
- SNP (disambiguation)
