= Uphues =

Uphues is a surname. Notable people with the surname include:

- Goswin Karl Uphues (1841–1916), German philosopher
- Joseph Uphues (1850–1911), German sculptor
