= Snipe (disambiguation) =

A snipe is a wading bird.

Snipe may also refer to:

- Woodcock

== People ==
- Snipe (rapper) (active 2007–2008), from New Orleans
- Snipe Conley (1894–1978), baseball pitcher
- Snipe Hansen (1907–1978), baseball pitcher for the Philadelphia Phillies and St. Louis Browns

== Places ==
- Snipe, Texas, a town in the US
- Outpost Snipe, a World War II location in the Second Battle of El Alamein
- Snipe islet, an islet in Chile near Argentina; see Snipe incident

== Technology and transportation ==
- Snipe (dinghy), a class of racing sailboat
- Snipe (wood machining), an unwanted deeper cut at the end of a board
- Snipe Diamond, a 1980s British ultralight aircraft
- Globe KDG Snipe, an American target drone
- Humber Snipe, a British automobile produced 1930–1940 and 1945–1948
- Humber Super Snipe, a British automobile produced 1938–1967
- Sopwith Snipe, a World War I biplane fighter

== Marketing ==
- Snipe (graphic), an overlay ad appearing during a TV program
- Snipe (theatrical), film (non-trailer) or other promotional material used in movie theaters

== Fictional characters ==
- Snipe (My Hero Academia), a manga series character
- The Snipe, one of the Titans in the video game Crash of the Titans

== Other uses ==
- "Snipe" (song), a 2009 J-pop song by Kotoko
- Snipe, the fictional target of a snipe hunt, a class of practical jokes
- Snipe incident, a 1958 military incident between Chile and Argentina in the Snipe Islet

== See also ==
- Snipe Fly, insects in the order Diptera, genus Rhagionidae
- Auction sniping, a strategy of placing a winning bid at the last possible moment
- Snipes (disambiguation)
- Sniper (disambiguation)
- Snape (disambiguation)
