= Sniper (disambiguation) =

A sniper is a military or police member or civilian who shoot targets, humans or animals at long ranges using rifles equipped with telescopic sights.

Sniper or the sniper may also refer to:

== People ==
- Adam Lindgren (born 1993), known as the Swedish Sniper, a Super Smash Bros. Melee player
- Luc Poirier (ring name "Sniper", born 1961), Canadian professional wrestler
- MC Sniper (born 1979), South Korean male rapper

== Arts, entertainment, and media ==
=== Fictional characters ===
- Sniper (comics), a fictional Marvel Comics character
- Sniper (Team Fortress 2), one of the nine playable classes in the video game

=== Films and television ===
==== Films ====
- Sniper (1931 film), a 1931 Soviet drama film
- The Deadly Tower, a 1975 film starring Kurt Russell, also known as Sniper
- Sniper (film series), a series of action and war films
  - Sniper (1993 film), the first film in the series, starring Tom Berenger and Billy Zane
- The Sniper (1952 film), by Edward Dmytryk
- The Sniper (2009 film), a Hong Kong action thriller film
- Sniper Special Ops, a 2016 American war film
- Sniper (2022 film), a Chinese war film
- Sniper: The White Raven, a 2022 Ukrainian film

==== Television ====
- "The Sniper" (M*A*S*H), a 1973 episode
- Snipers: Love under the Crosshairs, a 2012 Russian miniseries
- "Sniper" (Year of the Rabbit), a 2019 British comedy episode

=== Games ===
- Sniper Studios, an American game studio
- Sniper (1997), original title of SubSpace
- Sniper! (board game), a 1973 board game designed by James Dunnigan for TSR
  - Sniper! (video game), a computer game adaptation of the board game
- Sniper: Ghost Warrior, a first-person shooter series developed by City Interactive
- Sniper Fury (2015) is an online single player video game developed and published by Gameloft

=== Literature ===
- The Sniper (novel), 1974 thriller by Nelson DeMille, re-published in 1989 with the Joe Ryker series, with the author as Jack Cannon
- "The Sniper" (poem) (1917), by W.D. Cocker
- "The Sniper" (story) (January 12, 1923), by Liam O'Flaherty

=== Music ===
==== Groups and labels ====
- Sniper (American band), an American glam punk band
- Sniper (group), a French musical act made up of Tunisiano, Aketo and Blacko

==== Songs ====
- "Sniper" (song), a 1972 song by Harry Chapin

== Technology ==
- AT-11 Sniper or 9M119 Svir, a Soviet anti-tank missile
- Beretta Sniper, a bolt-action sporting rifle
- Lockheed Martin Sniper XR, targeting pod for fighter aircraft

== Other ==
- Auction sniping, the act of placing a winning bid at the last possible moment

== See also ==
- Shooter
- Snipes (disambiguation)
