= Deschutes River (disambiguation) =

Deschutes River is a major tributary of the Columbia River in central Oregon, U.S.

Deschutes River (French: Des Chutes River; Falls River) may also refer to:

- Little Deschutes River, a tributary of the Deschutes River in Oregon
- Deschutes River (Washington)
- River De Chute in Maine
- Rivière des Chutes (Batiscan River tributary), a river in Mauricie, Quebec, Canada

== See also ==
- Deschutes (disambiguation)
- Falls River (disambiguation)
