= Vivienne Hu =

American fashion designer

Vivienne Hu is an American fashion designer based in New York City.

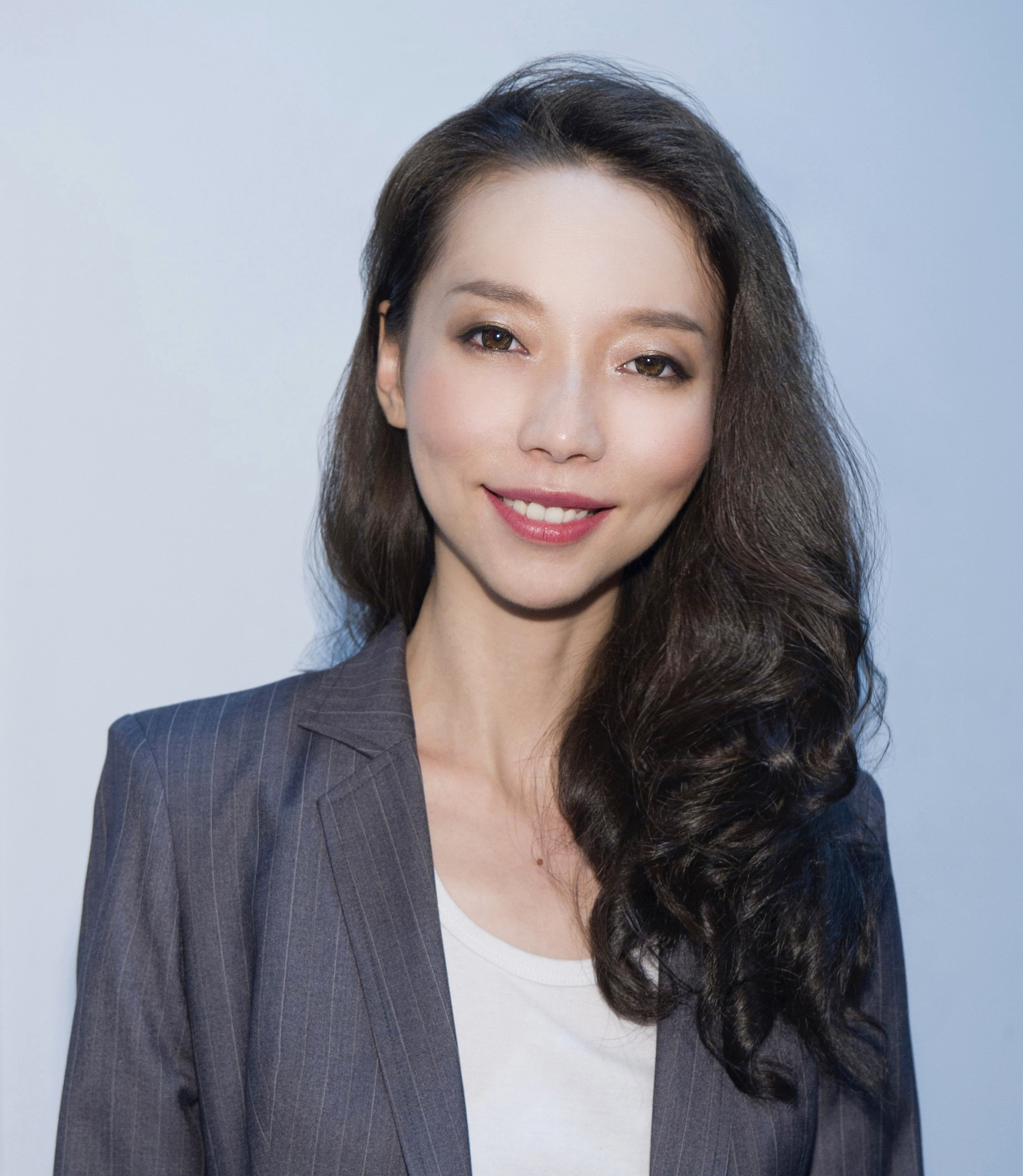
Vivienne Hu

== Early life ==
Hu was born in China. As a teenager, she moved to Germany to study at the University of Hohenheim and Goethe-Institut, earning a bachelor's degree in finance studies. After the degree, she joined Citibank on Wall Street to work in finance.

== Work ==
Hu later moved to the United States for her professional development. She worked at an investment bank for over three years, then attended Parsons School of Design and gained industry experience with Oscar de la Renta and Yigal Azrouel. Hu established her brand and debuted her spring/summer collection in 2012. The label has two stores in Soho, New York, that opened in 2013 and 2016 respectively, and its first China store opened in 2015.

Hu participated in Mercedes-Benz New York Fashion Week runways for the 2015 seasons, and subsequently in the re-branded NYFW-THE SHOWS runways for the 2016 and 2017 seasons. In 2015, Hu showcased her fall/winter 2015 collection at Shenzhen Fashion Week in China. Hu was named a Swarovski Collective 2016 designer. Vivienne has had seven consecutive runway shows at New York Fashion Week. Her shows have been attended by celebrities, such as Whoopi Goldberg, Anya Taylor-Joy, Clara Lee Paloma Ford and Eva Gutowski.

In 2017, Vivienne Hu branched out from Ready-to-Wear when she debuted her accessories line, Vivienne Hu Accessories, at her Spring/ Summer 2018 runway show. This line includes handbags, shoes and sunglasses. The Spring/Summer 2018 runway show was inspired by Amman, Jordan. Fashion Week Online stated "Vivienne Hu presented a slew of light and airy pieces that were given structure with strategically placed sashes, trims, and cutouts to highlight every girl’s best feature. The drama and excitement was all in the contrast of textures, layering of hard and soft, and the styling of each look." The F/W 2018 collection inspired by Dunhuang Mogao Caves was a huge success. Vivienne Hu released a line of new fashion sneakers in partnership with Tencent QQ, and this line soon attracted attention of fashion buyers such as Zappos. The bag collection also received positive feedbacks from mainstream fashion Media like Bazaar and Vogue Vogue Nederland. Bazaar featured the bags from Vivienne Hu's new collection in the slideshow "The Best Bags Spotted On The Fall 2018 Runways". F/W 2018 red carpet dress featured by Vogue Italy. In 2019, she receives the USC Pacific Asia Museum's 2019 Gala Visionary Artist Award and she is the only Chinese designer selected by Saga Furs for sponsorship this year. On February 15, 2019, her alma mater, Parsons School of Design, sent out a tweet applauding the NYFW looks of Vivienne Hu and Tomford via its official Twitter account(@parsonsdesign). Vivienne Hu is selected as a mentor at the Otis College of Art and Design in Los Angeles in 2019 and VHNY, the streetwear and athleisure focused line by Vivienne Hu, joined Macys’ ecommerce platform the same year.

== See also ==
- Chinese Americans in New York City
