= Berry, Quebec =

Berry
- Municipality
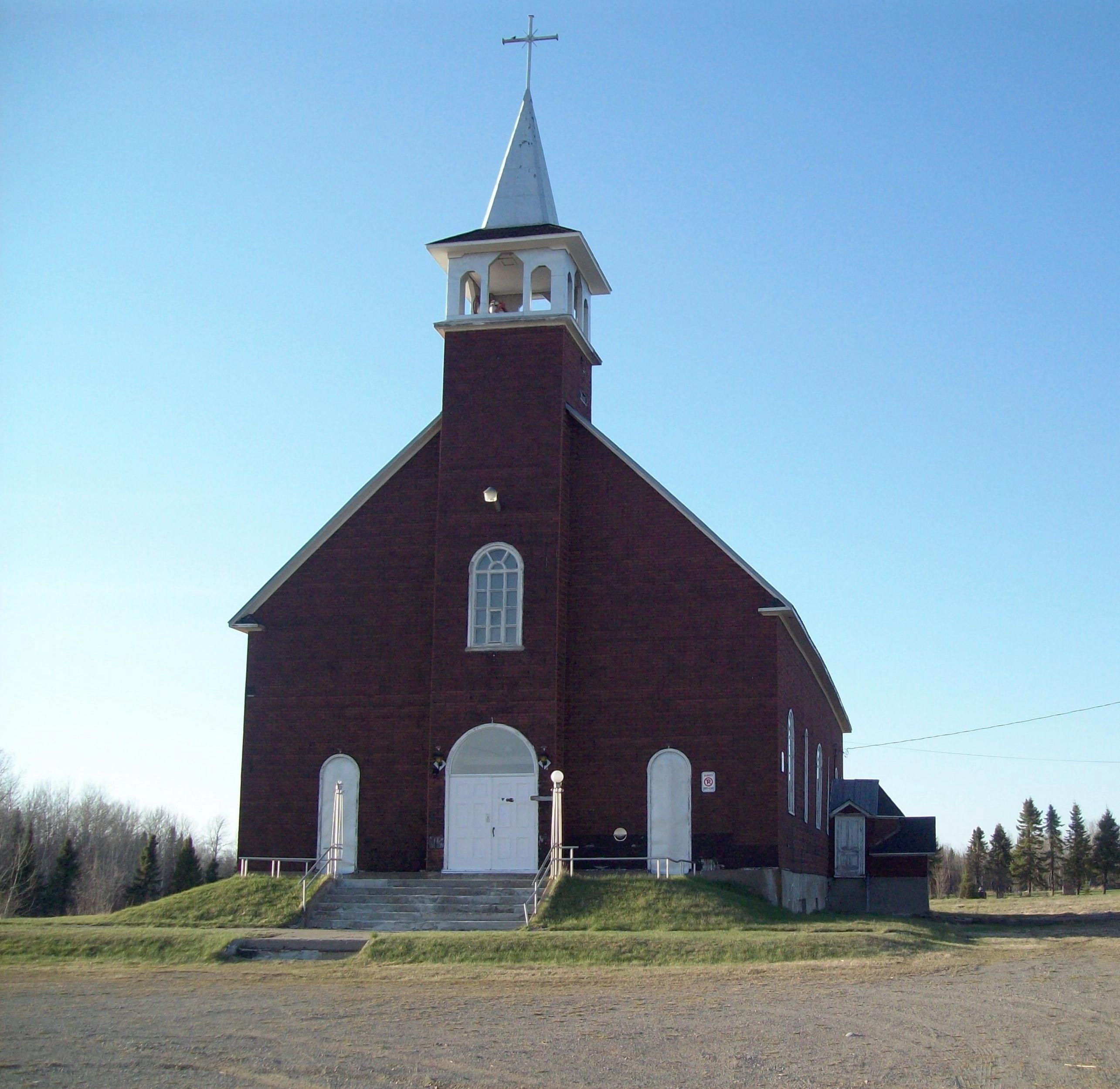
- St-Gérard-de-Berry

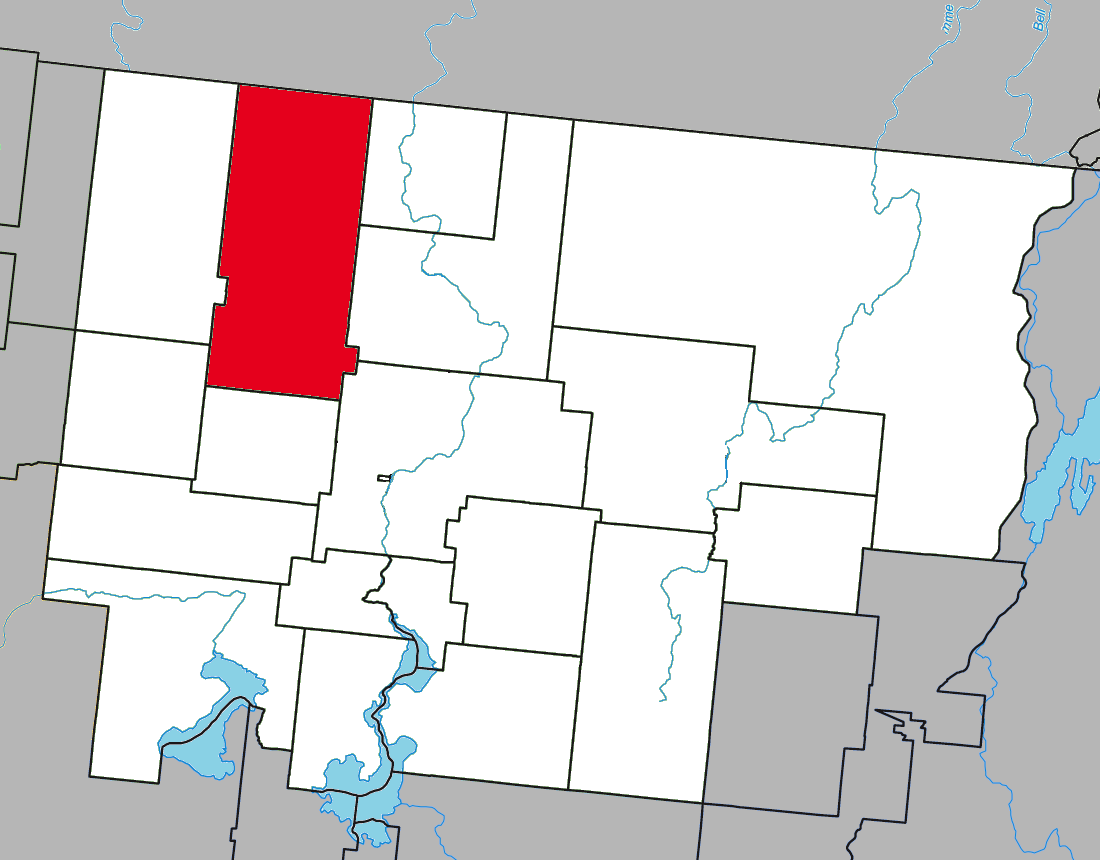
- Location within Abitibi RCM

- Location in western Quebec
- Coordinates: 48°49′N 78°16′W
- Country: Canada
- Province: Quebec
- Region: Abitibi-Témiscamingue
- RCM: Abitibi
- Settled: c. 1930
- Constituted: January 1, 1982

Government
  - Mayor: Jules Grondin
  - Federal riding: Abitibi—Témiscamingue
  - Prov. riding: Abitibi-Ouest

Area
  - Total: 579.96 km^{2} (223.92 sq mi)
  - Land: 575.07 km^{2} (222.04 sq mi)

Population (2021)
  - Total: 535
  - Density: 0.9/km^{2} (2.3/sq mi)
  - Pop (2016-21): ▼0.6%
  - Dwellings: 283
- Time zone: UTC−5 (EST)
  - Summer (DST): UTC−4 (EDT)
- Postal code(s): J0Y 2G0
- Area code: 819
- Highways: R-399
- Website: municipalites-du-quebec.com/berry/index.php

Berry (French pronunciation: [beʁi]) is a municipality in the Canadian province of Quebec, located in the Abitibi Regional County Municipality in the administrative region of Abitibi-Témiscamingue. The municipality had a population of 535 as of the 2021 Canadian census.

The municipality includes the population centres of Saint-Gérard-de-Berry and Saint-Nazaire-de-Berry (48°43′10″N 78°15′33″W).

== Geography ==
Berry is a municipality spread over a vast territory. It is distinguished by its many lakes and forests.

== Demographics ==
Historical census populations – Berry, Quebec

Year	Pop.	±%
1986	575	—
1991	518	−9.9%
1996	501	−3.3%
2001	489	−2.4%

Year	Pop.	±%
2006	560	+14.5%
2011	625	+11.6%
2016	538	−13.9%
2021	535	−0.6%

Source: Statistics Canada

Private dwellings occupied by usual residents (2021): 232 (total dwellings: 283)

Mother tongue (2021):

- English as first language: 0%
- French as first language: 99%
- English and French as first language: 0%
- Other as first language: 0%

== Government ==
Municipal council (as of 2023):

- Mayor: Jules Grondin
- Councillors: René Roy, Jacques Dussault, Sylvie Charette, Laurent Marcotte, Sylvie Gauthier, Martine Roy

List of former mayors:

- Jacques Hébert (...–2005)
- Jules Grondin (2005–2009, 2021–present)
- Jean-Pierre Naud (2009–2013)
- Raymond Doré (2013–2021)
