= École secondaire des Chutes =

École secondaire des Chutes (French: Chutes Secondary School; Falls Secondary) may refer to:

- École secondaire des Chutes (Rawdon) of the Commission scolaire des Samares
- École secondaire des Chutes (Shawinigan) of the Commission scolaire de l'Énergie

== See also ==
- Deschutes (disambiguation)
- Chute (disambiguation)
