= Quebec Route 399 =

Highway in Quebec, Canada

Route 399

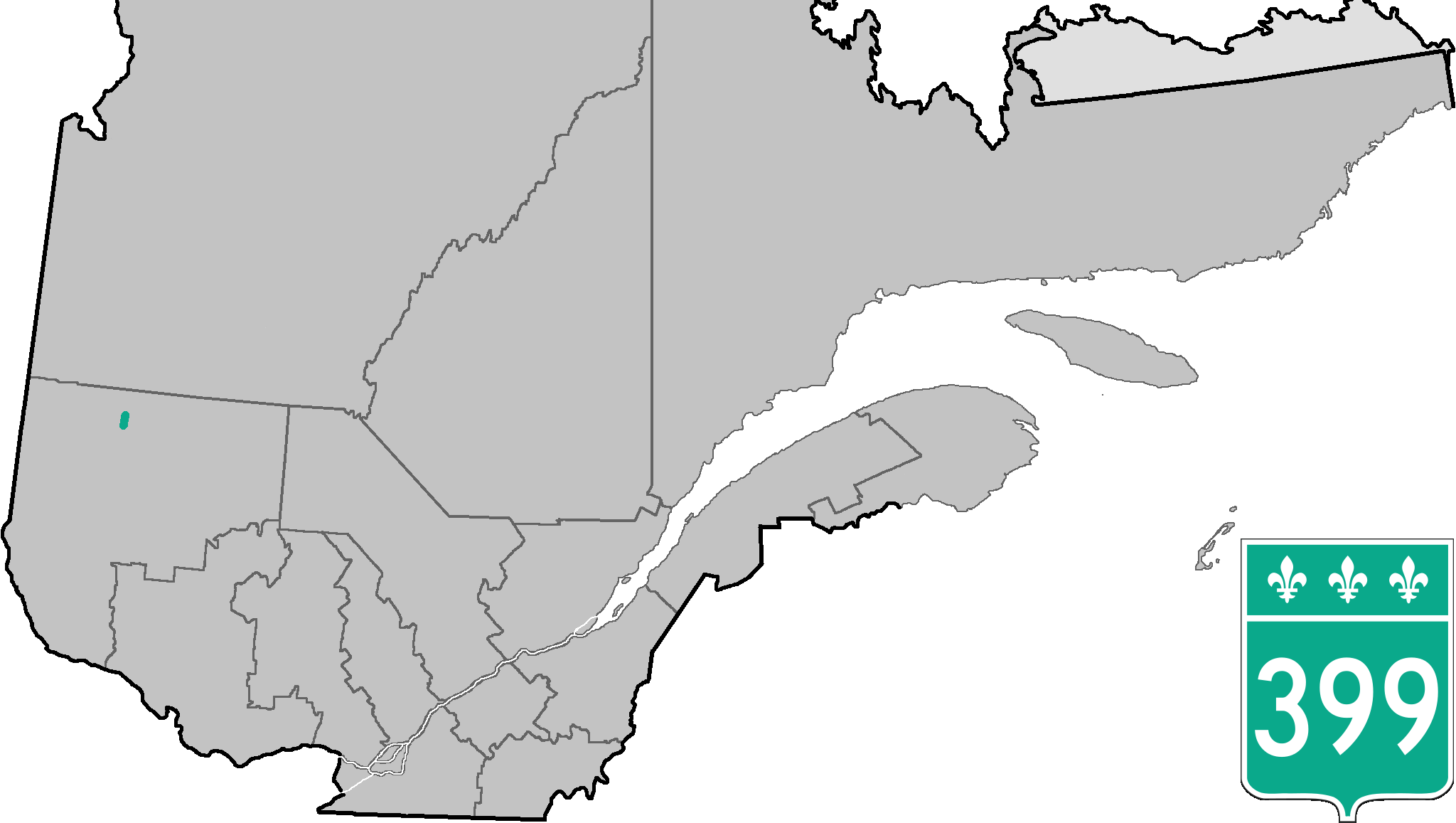

Route information
- Maintained by Transports Québec
- Length: 26 km (16 mi)

Major junctions
- South end: R-111 in Trécesson
- North end: Rang-de-Lac-À-Magny in Berry

Location
- Country: Canada
- Province: Quebec
- Major cities: Trécesson, Berry

Highway system
- Quebec provincial highways; Autoroutes; List; Former
← R-397	→ A-410

Route 399 is a short 26 kilometres (16 mi) two-lane north/south highway located in the Abitibi-Témiscamingue region in Quebec, Canada. It starts at the junction of Route 111 in Trécesson and ends in the village of Berry.

== Municipalities along Route 399 ==
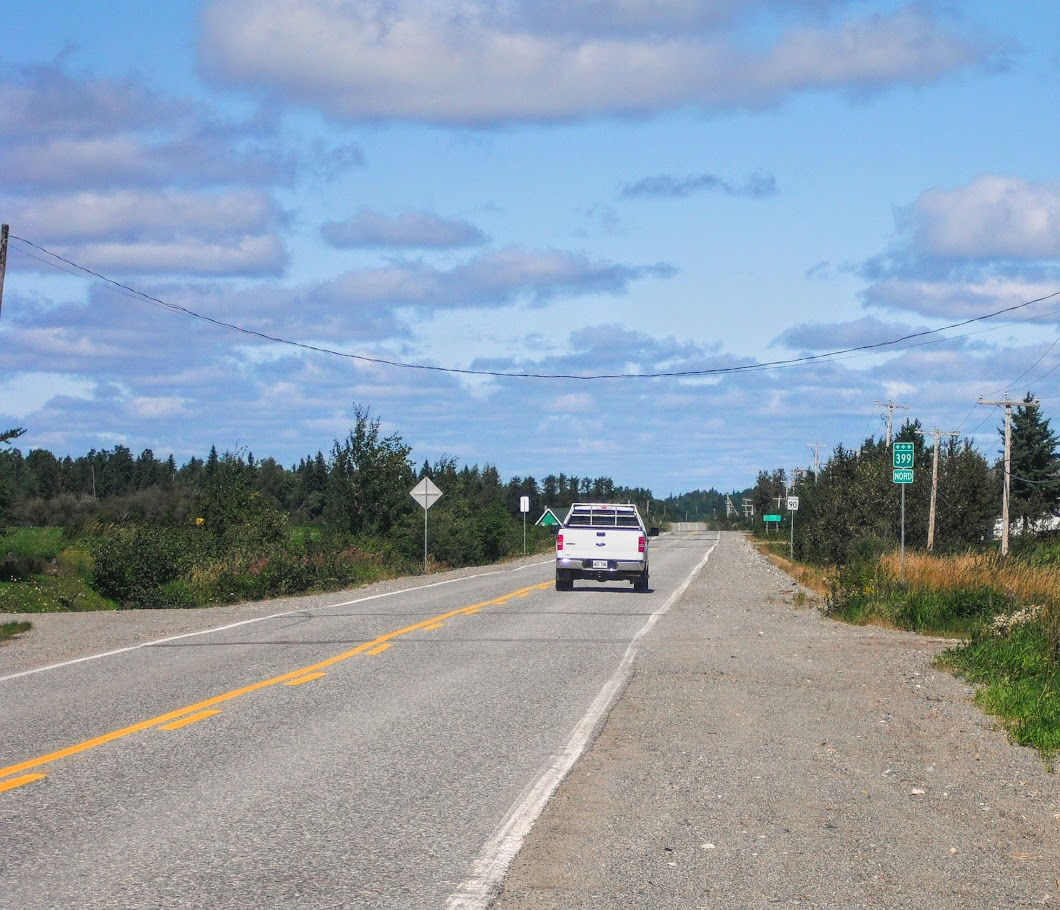
Quebec Route 399 in Trécesson

- Trécesson
- Berry

== See also ==
- List of Quebec provincial highways
