= W. D. Cocker =

Scottish poet

William Dixon Cocker (13 October 1882 – 1970) was a Scottish poet who wrote in both Scots and English.

== Life ==
W. D. Cocker was born in Rutherglen to a family of Glasgow merchants, although his family had connections to the rural Drymen area where he learned Scots.

In the First World War, he served with the Highland Light Infantry, and was taken prisoner in 1917. His war poetry is limited in scope, but includes the poems "Up the Line to Poelkapelle", "The Sniper" and a five-part sonnet cycle entitled "Sonnets in Captivity".

After the war Cocker entered the accounts department of the Daily Record, and was the paper's drama critic until his retirement in 1956. He is best known for his humorous poems in Scots, often on Biblical themes, such as "The Deluge", on the story of Noah and the Flood. Books of his poems include "Poems: Scots and English", "Further Poems", "New Poems" and "Random Rhymes and Ballads".
