= Shots =

Shots may refer to:

== Music ==
=== Albums ===
- Shots (Damien Dempsey album), 2005
- Shots (Ladyhawk album), 2008

=== Songs ===
- "Shots" (Imagine Dragons song), a 2015 single from the album Smoke + Mirrors
- "Shots" (LMFAO song), by LMFAO featuring Lil Jon from Party Rock
- "Shots", a song by Neil Young from Re·ac·tor

== Sports ==
- Aldershot Shots, a speedway team
- Aldershot Town F.C., an association football club nicknamed The Shots

== Other uses ==
- Shots (social network), a mobile app
- "Shots!!!", an episode of the animated series South Park
- Shots Studios, a Los Angeles-based media company

== See also ==
- Shot (disambiguation)
