= Deschutes =

Des chutes is French for of the falls, referring to waterfalls or rapids.

Deschutes or Des Chutes or variations may refer to:

== Places ==
- Deschutes County, Oregon, a county in the U.S. state of Oregon
- Deschutes National Forest, a national forest in Oregon
- Deschutes River, a river on the east side of Oregon's Cascade Range
  - Little Deschutes River, a tributary of the Deschutes River in Oregon
- Deschutes River (Washington), a river in the U.S. state of Washington
- Deschutes River Woods, Oregon, a census-designated place in Oregon
- Rivière des Chutes (Batiscan River tributary) (French: Des Chutes River; Falls River), a river in Mauricie, Quebec, Canada

== Facilities and structures ==
- Deschutes Hall, a building on the University of Oregon campus
- Deschutes Brewery, a brewery located in Bend, Oregon, USA
- Pont des Chutes (French: Des Chutes Bridge; Falls Bridge), a covered bridge in Abitibi-Témiscamingue, Quebec, Canada
- École secondaire des Chutes (disambiguation) (French: Des Chutes Secondary School
- Des Chutes Historical Museum, Bend, Deschutes, Oregon, USA
- Des Chutes Historical Center, Bend, Deschutes, Oregon, USA

== Other uses ==
- Deschutes (microprocessor), code name for an improved edition of Intel's Pentium II
- Des Chutes Railroad, part of the Columbia Southern Railway

== See also ==
- Chute (disambiguation)
