= Marchette Chute =

American writer (1909–1994)

Chute in 1974

Marchette Gaylord Chute (1909 – May 6, 1994) was an American writer. As a biographer, she specialized in English literary figures; she published biographies of Geoffrey Chaucer, Ben Jonson, and William Shakespeare. As a children's writer, she specialized in tales written during the periods described in her biographies, and in rhyming verses for children.

== Biography ==
Marchette Chute was born in Wayzata, Minnesota, to an upper-middle-class family. Her father William Chute was a realtor, and her English mother Edith Mary Pickburn Chute had been a hospital nurse in London. She attended Central High School in Minneapolis, and was then a student at the University of Minnesota. After her father's death in 1939 her mother moved the family to New York City to pursue her daughters' literary careers. Her older sister Mary Grace (b. 1907) (writing as "M. G. Chute") published, among other work, at least twenty stories in a series about "Sheriff John Charles Olson" in the Saturday Evening Post from 1938 to 1953. Her younger sister Beatrice Joy Chute (1913–1987), writing as B. J. Chute, wrote many adventure stories for teenaged boys and also romance stories, but is best known for her 1956 novel Greenwillow, the basis of the 1960 Frank Loesser musical Greenwillow.

With her sister Mary Grace, Marchette Chute wrote "Sweet Genevieve", a Broadway comedy which closed after one performance on March 20, 1945.

Over a seven-year period from 1946 through 1953, Marchette Chute published the trade biographies that established her reputation. Geoffrey Chaucer of England was published in 1946, Shakespeare of London in 1950, and Ben Jonson of Westminster in 1953. In each case, Chute attempted to write as an independent scholar with the ability to revisit and develop holistic portraits of her subjects based upon limited documentary evidence placed in a context of overall English social history.

=== Honors and legacy ===
Chute was seen by her colleagues as a significant writer of her day. She was elected to the American Academy of Arts and Letters and was elected president of the PEN American Center (a post her sister Beatrice Joy also held). She published a demicentennial history of the Center, PEN American Center: A History of the First 50 Years, in 1972. She also published a dual biography of George Herbert and Robert Herrick, Two Gentle Men, in 1959; it was a National Book Award finalist in 1960. She died in a Montclair, New Jersey nursing home on May 6, 1994. Her personal papers are now part of the de Grummond Children's Literature Collection within the University of Southern Mississippi.

== Selected works ==
- An Introduction to Shakespeare
- Around and About
- Ben Jonson of Westminster
- Geoffrey Chaucer of England
- Green Tree of Democracy
- Innocent Wayfaring
- Jesus of Israel
- Rhymes about Us
- Search for God
- Shakespeare of London
- Stories from Shakespeare
- The End of the Search
- The First Liberty: A History of the Right to Vote in America 1619-1850
- The Wonderful Winter
- Two Gentle Men: The Lives of George Herbert and Robert Herrick
- Two Gentlemen of Verona
