= Lac-Despinassy =

- Unorganized territory
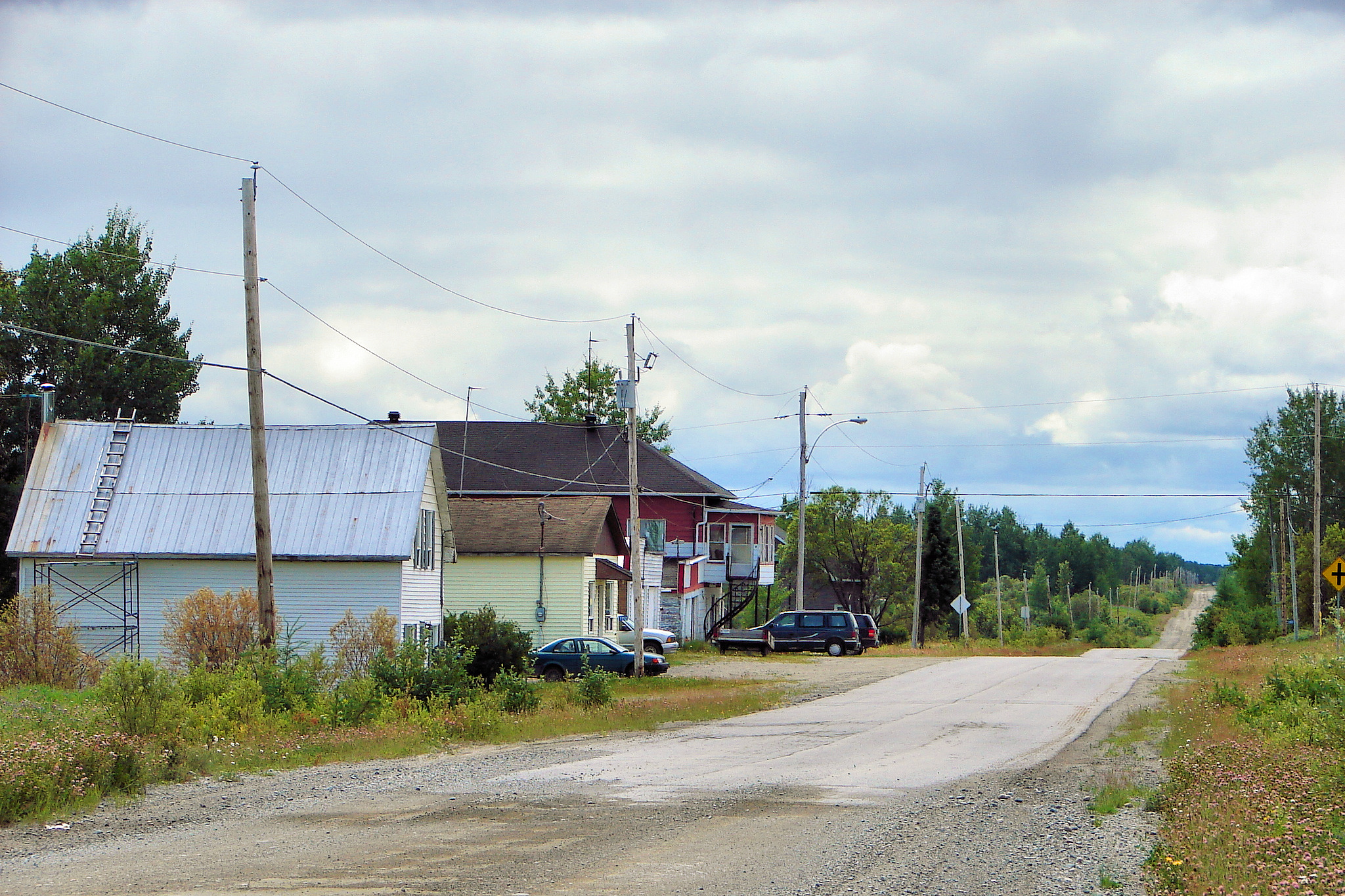
- Despinassy

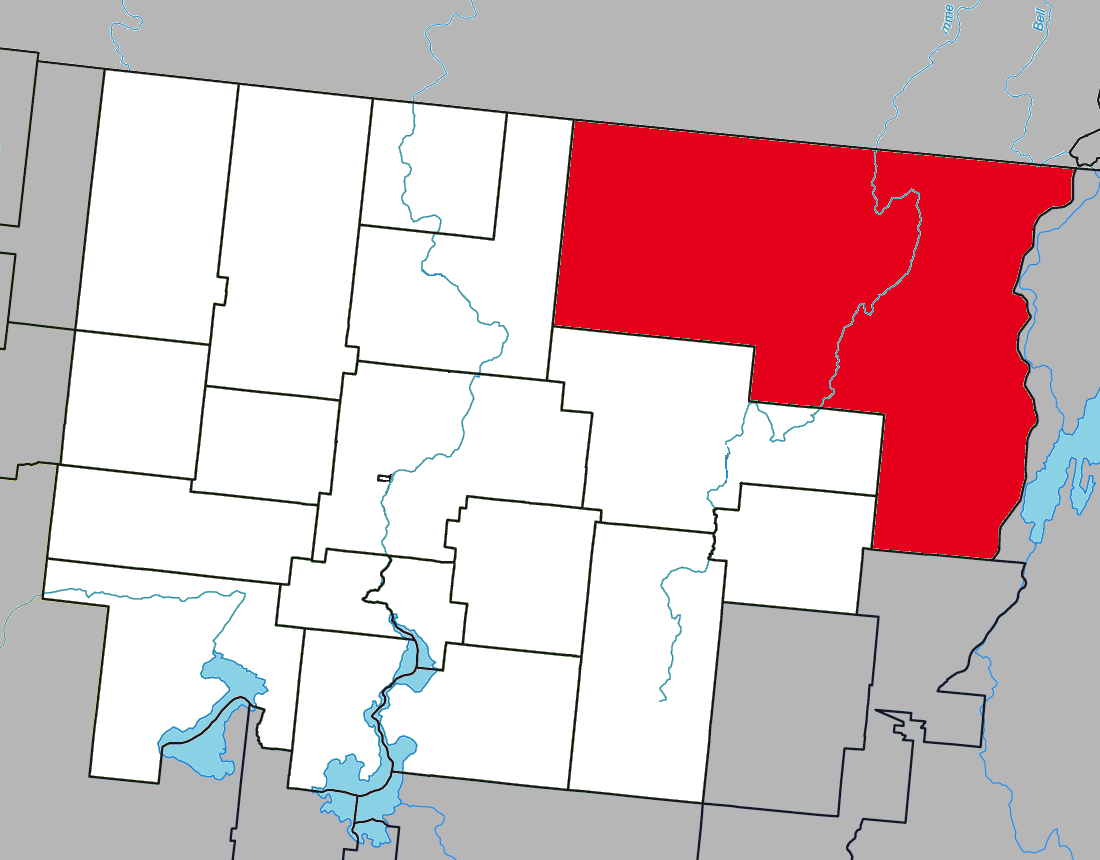
- Location within Abitibi RCM.

- Location in western Quebec.
- Coordinates: 48°47′N 77°20′W
- Country: Canada
- Province: Quebec
- Region: Abitibi-Témiscamingue
- RCM: Abitibi
- Constituted: January 1, 1986

Government
  - Federal riding: Abitibi—Témiscamingue
  - Prov. riding: Abitibi-Ouest

Area
  - Total: 1,856.10 km^{2} (716.64 sq mi)
  - Land: 1,848.65 km^{2} (713.77 sq mi)

Population (2021)
  - Total: 21
  - Density: 0/km^{2} (0/sq mi)
  - Pop 2016-2021: ▲110.0%
  - Dwellings: 12
- Time zone: UTC−05:00 (EST)
  - Summer (DST): UTC−04:00 (EDT)
- Area code: 819
- Highways: R-397

Lac-Despinassy (French pronunciation: [lak dɛspinasi]) is an unorganized territory in the Canadian province of Quebec, located within the Abitibi Regional County Municipality. The area is east of the municipality of Saint-Dominique-du-Rosaire, north of La Morandière-Rochebaucourt and the parish municipality of Senneterre, and west of the city of Senneterre.

The eponymous Lake Despinassy is the territory's largest lake and is named after the geographic township of Despinassy. This name was already assigned to the area in 1911 and comes from Louis-Auguste-Victor Despinassy, a lieutenant of the Royal Artillery and Engineers Corps in General Montcalm's army. The township is swampy, mostly forested, and flat, not exceeding 325 m (1,066 ft) above sea level. The Hurault and Lavigne Creeks, as well as the Despinassy and Laflamme Rivers, flow through the territory, while the Bell River forms its eastern boundary.

A few kilometres west of Lake Despinassy along Route 397 is the hamlet of Despinassy (48°45′48″N 77°26′26″W), the territory's only population centre. Founded in 1948, it is one of the youngest communities in the Abitibi. By 1952, there were 140 families, but most have since left. Currently, the area is being explored for potential mining of gold deposits.

== Demographics ==
Population trend:

- Population in 2021: 21
- Population in 2016: 10
- Population in 2011: 15
- Population in 2006: 25
- Population in 2001: 32
- Population in 1996: 51
- Population in 1991: 54
