= Trécesson =

- Township municipality
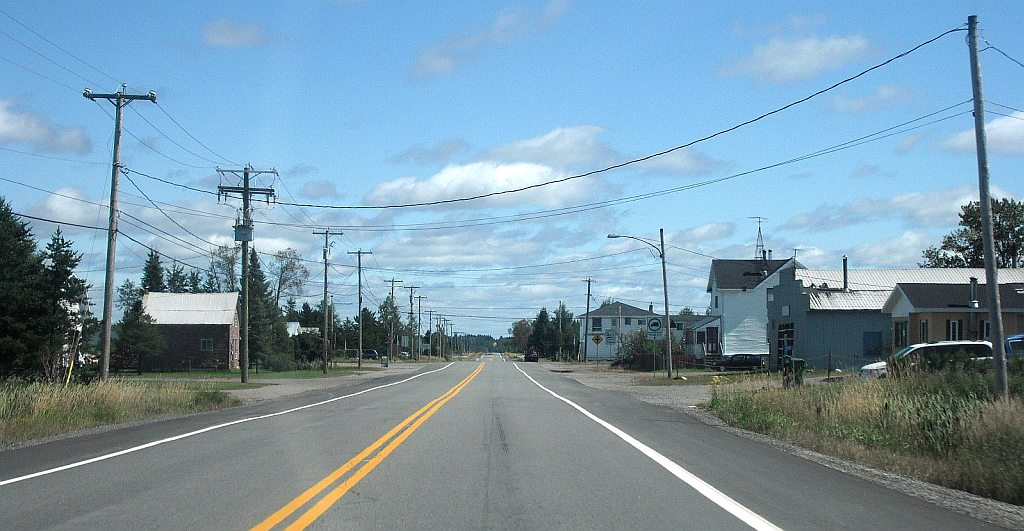
- Villemontel

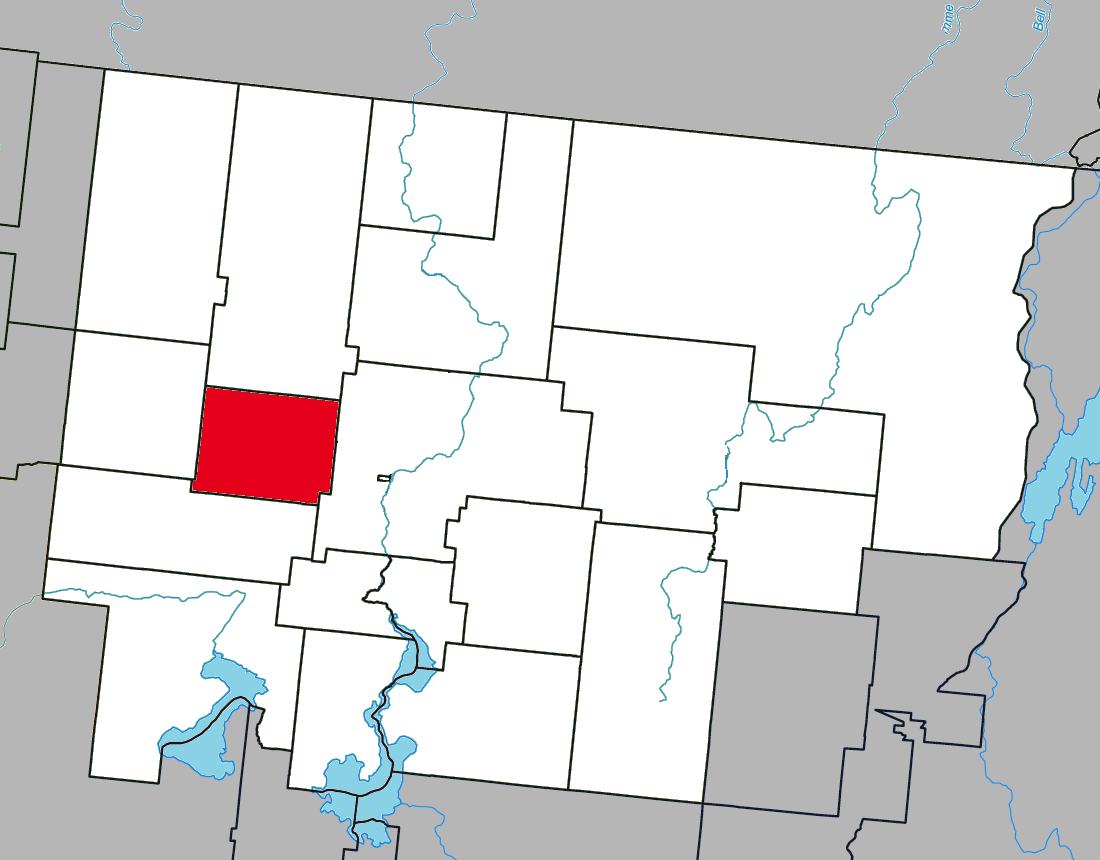
- Location within Abitibi RCM

- Location in western Quebec
- Coordinates: 48°39′N 78°19′W
- Country: Canada
- Province: Quebec
- Region: Abitibi-Témiscamingue
- RCM: Abitibi
- Settled: 1913
- Constituted: July 15, 1918
- Named for: Marie-Joseph Toussaint de Carné de Trécesson

Government
  - Mayor: Ghislain Nadeau
  - Federal riding: Abitibi—Témiscamingue
  - Prov. riding: Abitibi-Ouest

Area
  - Total: 203.25 km^{2} (78.48 sq mi)
  - Land: 196.89 km^{2} (76.02 sq mi)

Population (2021)
  - Total: 1,232
  - Density: 6.3/km^{2} (16/sq mi)
  - Pop (2006-21): ▲0.7%
  - Dwellings: 584
- Time zone: UTC−05:00 (EST)
  - Summer (DST): UTC−04:00 (EDT)
- Postal code(s): J0Y 2S0
- Area code: 819
- Highways: R-111 R-399
- Website: www.municipalitedetrecesson.com

Trécesson (French pronunciation: [tʁesɛsɔ̃]) is a township municipality in the Canadian province of Quebec, located in the Abitibi Regional County Municipality.

The municipality is part of the census agglomeration of Amos. It includes the communities of Clercs-Saint-Viateur, La Ferme, Lac-Davy, Trécesson, and Villemontel.

== Demographics ==
In the 2021 Census of Population conducted by Statistics Canada, Trécesson had a population of 1,232 living in 519 of its 584 total private dwellings, a change of 0.7% from its 2016 population of 1,223. With a land area of 196.89 km^{2} (76.02 sq mi), it had a population density of 6.3/km^{2} (16.2/sq mi) in 2021.

Historical census populations – Trécesson

| Year | Pop. | ±% |
|---|---|---|
| 1921 | 451 | — |
| 1931 | 797 | +76.7% |
| 1941 | 1,336 | +67.6% |
| 1951 | 1,200 | −10.2% |
| 1956 | 1,143 | −4.7% |
| 1961 | 1,131 | −1.0% |

| Year | Pop. | ±% |
|---|---|---|
| 1966 | 935 | −17.3% |
| 1971 | 847 | −9.4% |
| 1976 | 809 | −4.5% |
| 1981 | 1,059 | +30.9% |
| 1986 | 983 | −7.2% |
| 1991 | 1,061 | +7.9% |

| Year | Pop. | ±% |
|---|---|---|
| 1996 | 1,145 | +7.9% |
| 2001 | 1,177 | +2.8% |
| 2006 | 1,195 | +1.5% |
| 2011 | 1,138 | −4.8% |
| 2016 | 1,223 | +7.5% |
| 2021 | 1,232 | +0.7% |

Source: Statistics Canada

Mother tongue (2021):

- English as first language: 0%
- French as first language: 98.8%
- English and French as first language: 0.4%
- Other as first language: 0.4%

== Government ==
Municipal council (as of 2023):

- Mayor: Ghislain Nadeau
- Councillors: André Masson, Nadia Caron, Nathalie Dion, Martin Veilleux, Rémi Roy, Stephan Roy

List of former mayors:

- Anita Bédard-Larochelle (...–2005, 2013–2017)
- Jacques Trudel (2005–2009)
- Ghislain Nadeau (2009–2013, 2021–present)
- Chantal Poliquin (2017–2018)
- Jacques Grenier (2019–2021)
