= B. J. Chute =

American writer and academic (1913–1987)

- Born: Beatrice Joy Chute; January 3, 1913; Minneapolis, Minnesota, U.S.
- Died: September 6, 1987 (aged 74); New York City, New York, U.S.
- Relatives: Marchette Chute (sister)
- Writing career
- Notable work: Greenwillow

Beatrice Joy Chute (January 3, 1913 – September 6, 1987) was an American writer and academic. She is best known for her 1956 novel Greenwillow.

== Early life ==
Chute was the daughter of William Young Chute (1863–1939), a Minneapolis real estate broker, and his wife Edith May "Mollie" Pickburn, an immigrant from Great Britain who had been a nurse in a London hospital. Chute's paternal grandfather, Richard Chute (1820–1893), was a prominent early Minnesota businessman. The family spent much of their time at their country home, "Hazelwood". She was the youngest of three sisters, the older sisters being Mary Grace Chute (b. 1907) and Marchette Gaylord Chute (1909–1994). All three sisters became writers. Mary Grace published, among other work, at least twenty stories in a series about "Sheriff John Charles Olson" in the Saturday Evening Post from 1938 to 1953. Marchette was known chiefly for her biographies of English historical figures; her 1950 Shakespeare of London was a bestseller, and Two Gentle Men: The Lives of George Herbert and Robert Herrick (1959) was a finalist for the National Book Award for Nonfiction in 1960.

Joy Chute worked at her father's realty office until around the time of his death. In the early 1940s her mother moved the family to New York City to pursue the sisters' literary careers.

== Career ==
Much of her early work was adventure and sports stories for boys, such as "Oh, Say Can You Ski?" (Boys' Life, January 1938). She continued to write similar material, as well as romance stories for women's magazines, through much of the 1940s, including several sports-themed novels - Blocking Back (1938), Shattuck Cadet (1941), and Shift to the Right (1944). In 1950 Chute published her first major work aimed at the adult market, The Fields are White, a novel of marriage and manners. After this her production of genre short stories declined.

In 1956 she published Greenwillow, her most successful work. The book was a fable set in the fictional village of Greenwillow. A critic called it "a deeply moving, gently humorous and serenely wise" story of young love and self-discovery. It went on to be a finalist for the National Book Award for Fiction in 1957, and was the basis for a modestly successful 1960 Frank Loesser Broadway musical, Greenwillow. She published novels, children's books, and books of short stories and edited one with a Christmas theme (Behold that Star, 1966). Her last book was The Good Woman (1986).

In 1964 she became an adjunct professor of creative writing at Barnard College and taught there for the rest of her life. She was at one time the director of Books Across the Sea and also president of PEN American Center (a position her sister Marchette also held).
