= Richard Shute =

British classicist and logician

Richard Shute (6 November 1849 – 22 September 1886) was a British classicist and logician.

Richard Shute was the only son of Richard Shute of Sydenham, Kent. He was educated at Eton College, and matriculated at Trinity Hall, Cambridge in 1868. However, he transferred to New Inn Hall, Oxford, where he matriculated in 1870, graduating B.A. in 1872. He was a senior student at Christ Church, Oxford from 1872 to 1886, and tutor from 1876 to 1882. He died of consumption at Oxford in 1886. At the time of his death he had been appointed professor of logic at Bombay.

Shute's Discourse on Truth (1877) was adapted into German by Goswin Karl Uphues. Shute's Conington Prize essay on the Aristotelian writings was published posthumously: there Shute held that the surviving works were not written by Aristotle himself, but had been "filtered at least through other minds".

== Works ==
- Essays on certain logical questions, Oxford, London: James Parker and Co., 1874.
- A Discourse on Truth, London, 1877.
- (ed.) Aristotle's Physics, book VII, a transcript of the Paris ms. 1859 collated with the Paris mss. 1861 and 2633 and a manuscript in the Bodleian library, Oxford: Clarendon Press, 1882.
- On the History of the Process by which the Aristotelian Writings arrived at their Present Form: with a Brief Mention of the Author, Oxford: Clarendon Press, 1888. (Conington Prize essay for 1882.)
