= The Sniper (poem) =

The Sniper is a World War I poem by Scottish poet W D Cocker, written in 1917 about the impact a sniper has had not only on the life of the young soldier, but also on that soldier's family back home. It is not revealed which side the sniper is on, as the deed is the same, whether the victim is German or British.

This poem shows Cocker's dissatisfaction with what was becoming almost anonymous cold-blooded killing from varying distances (200 yards within the poem) - a far cry from battles before the age of industrialisation, when soldiers and warriors fought face to face, with the stronger individual emerging the victor.
