= Shooter =

Shooter may refer to:

- Someone who does the act of Shooting

== People ==
- Adrian Shooter (1948–2022), British transport executive
- Evan McPherson (born 1999), American football placekicker nicknamed "Shooter"
- Jim Shooter (1951–2025), American writer
- Mike Shooter, British psychiatrist
- Rod Beck (1968–2007), American baseball pitcher nicknamed "Shooter"
- Shooter Jennings (born 1979), American country music singer

== Arts, entertainment, and media ==
=== Films ===
- Shooter (1987 film), American television film
- Shooter (2007 film), feature film directed by Antoine Fuqua and starring Mark Wahlberg
- Shooter (2016 film), Bangladeshi action film featuring Shakib Khan
- Shooter, working title of Operation Fryday, a 2023 Indian Hindi-language film on ZEE5 by Vishram Sawant, starring Sunil Shetty and Randeep Hooda
- Shooters (2001 film), British television documentary
- Shooters (2002 film), British crime drama directed by Colin Teague
- The Shooter (1995 film), starring Dolph Lundgren, also known as Hidden Assassin
- The Shooter (1997 film), starring Michael Dudikoff
- The Shooter (2013 film), Danish film

=== Games ===
- Shooter, the person designated to roll the dice in a game of craps
- Shooter, a large toy marble used to hit other marbles
- Shooter game, a subgenre of the action video game genre
  - First-person shooter (FPS), a subgenre of the shooter video game genre
  - Shoot 'em up, a subgenre of the shooter video game genre
  - Third-person shooter (TPS), a subgenre of the shooter video game genre

=== Music ===
==== Groups and musicians ====
- Shooter (band), a Canadian 1970s rock band
- Shooter (rapper), a rapper from New York
- The Shooters, an American 1980s country band

==== Songs ====
- "Shooter" (song), by Lil Wayne and Robin Thicke
- "Shooters" (song), by Tory Lanez

=== Other uses in arts, entertainment, and media ===
- Shooter (TV series), a 2016 American television series starring Ryan Phillippe
- Shooter McGavin, a fictional character in the film Happy Gilmore

== Other uses ==
- Shooter (mixed drink), a mixed alcoholic drink served in a shot glass
- Zouk Mosbeh SC, formerly known as Shooterz Club, a Lebanese multi-sports club
- "Shooter", another name for the multiple lining tool in engraving
- Shooter, or clicker, a colloquialism for remote control
- Catapult Officer, or shooter, a position in the United States Navy air carrier operations
- Shooter, a ball that keeps very low on pitching in cricket

== See also ==
- "Shoota", a song by Playboi Carti featuring Lil Uzi Vert
- Shoot (disambiguation)
- Sniper (disambiguation)
