= Bernetz River =

River in Quebec, Canada

Coordinates: 49°04′08″N 77°21′38″W

The Bernetz River (French: Rivière Bernetz) is a river in Quebec, Canada. It is 22.3-kilometre-long (13.9 mi) and is a tributary of the Laflamme River, itself a tributary of the Bell River, which flows from the south into Lake Matagami. The river's catchment area is entirely forested and falls within the boundaries of the Eeyou Istchee (Baie-James) municipality in the administrative region of Nord-du-Quebec. The Bernetz River normally freezes over between December and April.
