= Pont des Chutes =

Covered bridge in Quebec, Canada

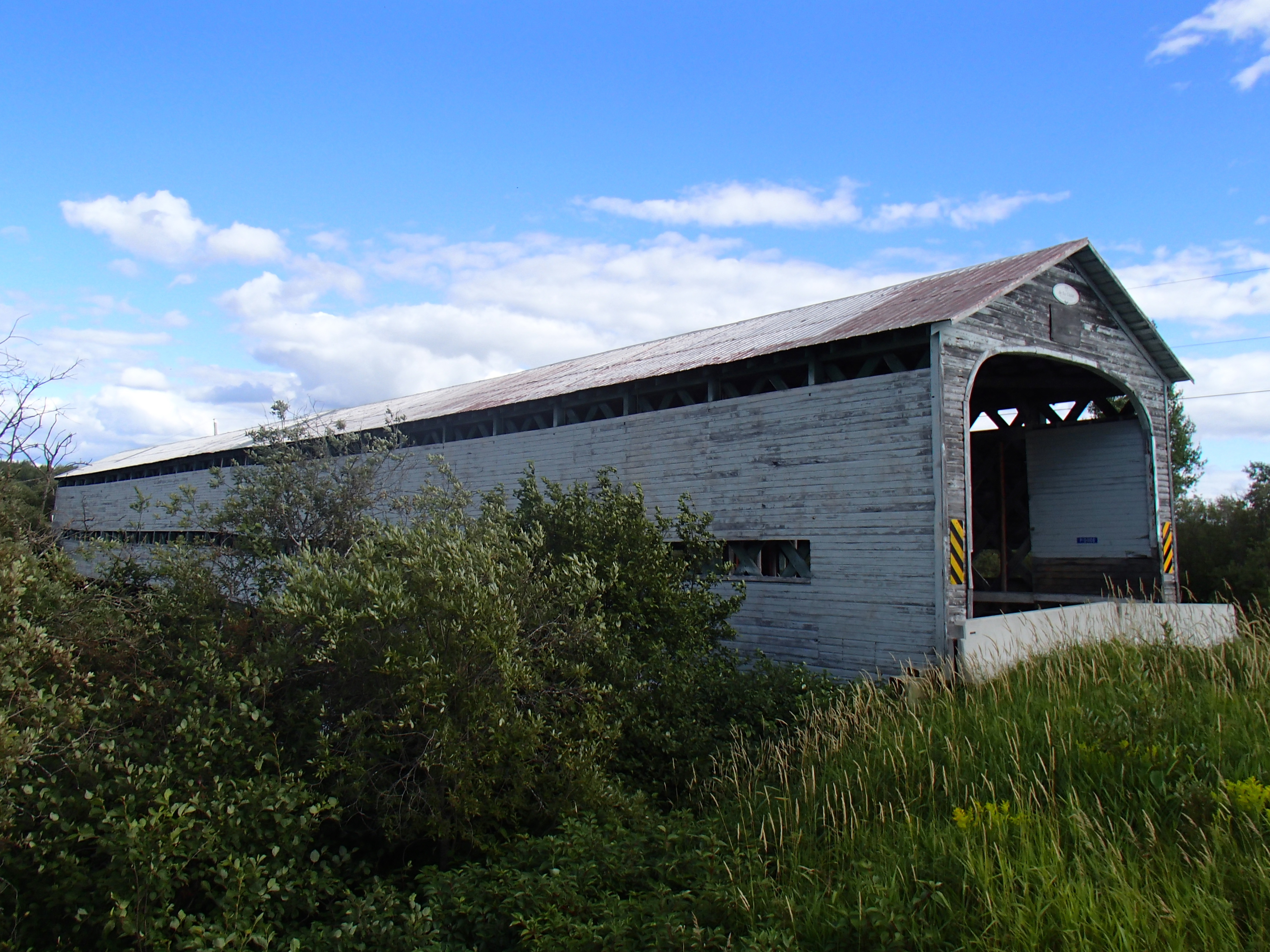
- Coordinates: 48.704722°N 77.444722°W
- Carries: Road Bridge
- Crosses: Rivière Laflamme
- Locale: La Morandière-Rochebaucourt

Characteristics
- Design: Town lattice
- Material: Wood
- Total length: 64m
- Clearance above: 4.42m

History
- Opened: 1954
- Closed: 2010

The pont des Chutes is a covered bridge in Abitibi-Témiscamingue, Canada.

Built in 1954, it was severely damaged in 1961 and again in 1964 when the central pillar failed. The capacity was 8 tonnes. It is so named because of the rapids (chutes) underneath it.

Among the last in Quebec, 34 covered bridges were constructed in Abitibi, and are associated with the colonisation of the region in the early 1900s. Today fewer than half of them are extant.

The single-lane bridge is of Lattice truss bridge design. This design was modified by the Quebec Ministry of Colonisation and was used for more than 500 covered bridges in Quebec.

The bridge does not benefit from any provincial or municipal protection.

== See also ==
- List of covered bridges in Quebec
