= Snipes (surname) =

Snipes is a surname. Notable people with the surname include:

- Angelo Snipes (born 1963), American football linebacker
- Brenda Snipes (born 1943), American supervisor of elections in Florida
- Renaldo Snipes (born 1956), American boxer
- Roxy Snipes (1896–1941), American baseball player for the Chicago White Sox
- Wesley Snipes (born 1962), American actor
