= Snape =

Snape may refer to:

== Places ==
- Snape Island, Hudson Bay, Canada
- Snape, North Yorkshire, a village in England
- Snape, Suffolk, a marshland, a village and an arts centre in England

== People ==
- Andrew Snape (1675–1742), headmaster of Eton College
- Henry Lloyd Snape (1861–1933), British chemist
- Jack Snape, half of the electropop duo To My Boy
- Jeremy Snape (born 1973), English cricketer
- Martin Snape (1852–1930), English painter
- Maurice Snape (1923–1992), English cricketer
- Peter Snape (1942-2026), British politician and Baron Snape
- Steve Snape (born 1963), English former rugby league footballer
- William Snape (born 1985), British actor who is known for playing in The Full Monty

== Arts and entertainment ==
- Severus Snape, a character in the Harry Potter books
- Snape (band), an English blues-rock ensemble
