= Shooters (song) =

2017 single by Tory Lanez

Single by Tory Lanez

from the album Memories Don't Die
- Released: September 22, 2017
- Genre: Trap
- Length: 3:28
- Label: Mad Love; Interscope
- Songwriter(s): Daystar Peterson; Charles Dumazer
- Producer(s): C-Sick

Tory Lanez singles chronology
| "Special 4 U" (2017) | "Shooters" (2017) | "Skrt Skrt" (2017) |

Music video
- "Shooters" on YouTube

"Shooters" is a song by Canadian rapper Tory Lanez, released on September 22, 2017, as the lead single from his second studio album Memories Don't Die (2018). The track was produced by C-Sick.

== Composition ==
The song contains horn-led production, beginning with a "grand, cinematic" beat in the style of trap. Lyrically, Tory Lanez brags about his success, including his wealth, luxuries, and relationships with women.

== Music video ==
An official music video of the song premiered exclusively on Billboard on October 12, 2017. The video addresses the theme of police brutality, inspired by the documentary miniseries Time: The Kalief Browder Story. In an interview with Billboard, Tory Lanez explained:

"His story led me to research various cases of people who were wrongfully charged, and I looked up statistics on how many unarmed Black people are shot each year – and how many of those officers were indicted. The numbers were staggering: hundreds of deaths, with less than one percent of officers convicted." "I imagined that, at times, those families might have thought, "What if I could go kill the officer who killed my son or nephew?" What I'm trying to convey with this message is that, no matter how you may feel, violence is not the answer. Even with the cops, killing us isn't the answer either."

The video, co-directed with Zac Facts, opens with a disclaimer explaining the inspiration and intentions behind the intro, along with the message, "Sometimes the only justice is injustice". Following this, the video begins with a skit in which Lanez and a friend seek revenge on a police officer who had shot and killed Lanez's cousin. They sneak into the officer's home and kill him. As they leave, they are confronted by two white police officers who question and aim their guns at them. Lanez and his friend respond calmly, raising their arms up in a "Hands up, don't shoot" gesture. Tory's friend is shot dead by the police, prompting Tory to pull out his gun in retaliation, only to be killed as well. The visual then transitions to scenes of Lanez wearing luxury clothing, driving expensive cars, and surrounded by women smoking marijuana.It also shows Lanez with woman holding guns, men being arrested, and American flag with bullet holes painted on the back of a woman. The video ends with a dead body laid out on a concrete floor, covered in flowers to symbolize the innocence of unarmed people who have died.

== Charts ==
Chart performance for "Shooters"
| Chart (2017–2018) | Peak position |
|---|---|
| Canada (Canadian Hot 100) | 68 |
| US Bubbling Under Hot 100 Singles (Billboard) | 19 |

== Certifications ==
Certifications for "Shooters"
| Region | Certification | Certified units/sales |
|---|---|---|
| Canada (Music Canada) | Gold | 40,000^{‡} |
| United States (RIAA) | Gold | 500,000^{‡} |
^{‡} Sales+streaming figures based on certification alone.
