= Shooting (bridge) =

Technique in playing cards

Shooting is an approach in bridge to the bidding or play of a hand which aims for a favorable result by making a choice that is slightly against the odds. A player might decide to shoot toward the end of a pairs game, when he judges that he needs tops to win, not just average-plus results.

Shooting is generally considered an ethical maneuver when it is used sparingly in an attempt to improve one's score. It is regarded as contrary to the proprieties if a player, perhaps angry with his partner, starts bidding and playing every hand in ways that disregard winning technique.

In contrast, a player who is shooting makes a bid or play that is only slightly inferior, in the hope that the cards lie in such a way that the normal, percentage action will lose. In the long run, even slightly inferior actions lose to the better bid or play, so it is not sensible to shoot unless the only hope left is an unusual situation, such as a 4–1 instead of a 3–2 trump break, or a normal 3NT contract that goes down on normal play.

Although it is possible to shoot in either the bidding or the play, authorities disagree on whether it is wise to do so in the bidding. For example, Marshall Miles has written that "There is no way to estimate the effects of weird bidding on a particular hand, and it is almost impossible to start shooting in the bidding without having partnership confidence suffer."

On the other hand, if shooting, Hugh Kelsey recommends a pass with ♠ 6 ♥ A J 7 2 ♦ K J 8 4 3 ♣ K 4 2 over RHO's opening bid of 1♠. Kelsey notes that everyone else will double, because in the long run it is the best call. But if LHO has a good redouble, or if the takeout double leads to an unmakeable game, or if declarer misguesses because you pass, then you might get a very good result (more often, you'll get a bottom). Notice that Kelsey's suggestion conforms to the basic notion of taking an action that is slightly against the odds. To pass with a much stronger hand would be far too extreme an action.

== Examples ==
Miles gives these hands as examples of shooting in the play:

♠♤	5 3
♥	8 4 2
♦	6 5
♣♧	A 8 7 5 3 2
N S
♠♤	A Q 6
♥	A K 6 5
♦	A Q 9
♣♧	K 9 4

West leads the ♠4 against a typical 3NT contract. South wins East's ♠K and plays the ♣K, East and West following with the ♣6 and ♣10. The correct play now at rubber bridge or IMPs is to duck a round of clubs. By ducking, declarer maintains an entry to dummy if he gets a 3–1 split. Doing so guarantees the contract. At pairs, if South is shooting, he might lead the ♣9 to the ♣A, hoping for a 2–2 split (only somewhat against the odds). If he gets that split, South wins at least 11 tricks. This will be a likely top, because declarers who are not so desperate, and who duck a club in deference to the odds, will win a trick fewer. Of course if South doesn't get a 2–2 split, he'll probably go down one or two, for a bottom.

♠♤	K 10
♥	6
♦	Q J 5 4
♣♧	A 10 7 5 3 2
N S
♠♤	A J 9 7 5 3
♥	A 5 4 2
♦	—
♣♧	K Q 8

This 4♠ contract is complex. At rubber bridge or IMPs, South should play to ruff two hearts in dummy, to guard against either opponent's holding of queen-fourth of spades. That play would hold South to ten tricks (losing two spades and a heart when either opponent holds ♠Q8xx) but gives South the best chance of ten tricks against either a 3–2 or 4–1 trump split.

But at pairs, South should not give up on overtricks to guard against the 8.4% possibility of ♠Q8xx. After winning the opening lead of the ♥K, strong declarers will finesse the ♠10 at trick two. If the finesse loses, the ♠K will stop the hearts. If South gets the more likely 3–2 spade split, he'll win 12 or 13 tricks, depending on the success of the finesse at trick 2. (Miles does not discuss the 9.6% possibility of a 4–0 club split.)

If South wants to shoot, Miles notes that declarer could adopt the rubber bridge approach of ruffing two hearts, in effect playing for the spades to split badly. But a better shot is to lead to the ♠K and then finesse the ♠J. This play will get South a top when East holds one, two or three spades to the ♠Q, but if it is West who holds ♠Qx or ♠Qxx, South will get a bottom.
