= Greenwillow =

Musical with a book by Lesser Samuels and Frank Loesser

- Original Recording
- Music: Frank Loesser
- Lyrics: Frank Loesser
- Book: Lesser Samuels; Frank Loesser
- Basis: Novel by B.J. Chute
- Productions: 1960 Broadway

Greenwillow is a musical with a book by Lesser Samuels and Frank Loesser and music and lyrics by Loesser, based on the novel by B. J. Chute. The musical is set in the magical town of Greenwillow. It ran on Broadway in 1960.

== Plot ==
In Greenwillow, the eldest in each generation of Briggs men must obey the "call to wander", while the women they leave behind care for the home and rear their children in the hope that someday their husbands will return. Gideon loves his girlfriend, Dorrie, and would like nothing better than to settle down with her. He finds in the town's newest inhabitant, the Reverend Birdsong, an ally who will try to help him make his dream come true.

== Productions ==
The musical had a pre-Broadway try-out at the Shubert Theatre in Philadelphia. It opened on Broadway on March 8, 1960, at the Alvin Theatre, and closed on May 28, 1960, after 97 performances. The director was George Roy Hill and choreographer was Joe Layton; with orchestrations by Don Walker, scenery by Peter Larkin and costumes by Alvin Colt. The cast included Anthony Perkins as Gideon Briggs, Cecil Kellaway, Pert Kelton, Ellen McCown as Dorrie Whitbred, William Chapman, Marian Mercer and Tommy Norden. Greenwillow was being rehearsed in New York while Perkins was filming Psycho (1960) in Los Angeles. Because Perkins had a stand-in for the film's shower scene, Hitchcock allowed him to attend rehearsals for the musical in New York.

The show received mixed reviews. The New York Times described it as "an enchanted fable" with "an ideal libretto [and a] warm and varied score that captures the simple moods of the story ... [a] winning cast [and] joyous ballets." Ward Morehouse wrote in the Long Island Star-Journal, "Frank Loesser retains his standing as a composer but he is lost as a librettist ... the book that he has written in collaboration with Lesser Samuels is hopelessly stodgy." Morehouse praised the cast, sets and choreography, but concluded, "Greenwillow is a lost cause." The Philadelphia Inquirer excerpted opening-week reviews from several New York papers: "The new musical is do-it-yourself folklore, which means that it is spun right out of someone’s head instead of out of somebody else’s past. ... Greenwillow is [not] good Broadway ... a mélange" (Walter Kerr, New York Herald Tribune). "[It] has moments of fresh charm, but it also turns out to be upsettingly flat, stodgy and lacking in emotional effectiveness ... scenes and characters that possessed touching or humorous charm in the novel become excessively whimsical and uncomfortably coy, when not simply dull, on the stage" (Richard Watts, Jr., New York Post). "[It] brings heart and hope. ... It is not, perhaps, what the trade regards as a 'sockoo success' ... but it is musically more ambitious, and is loaded with the sort of homespun pathos and humor which should keep it running until the scenery quietly comes apart" (John McClain, New York Journal-American).

The musical was presented in 2004 by the off-Broadway York Theatre Company in its "Musicals-in-Mufti" series. Peter Filichia described the score as "grand".

== Original cast and characters ==
Character	Broadway (1960)
Gideon Briggs	Anthony Perkins
Reverend Birdsong	Cecil Kellaway
Gramma Briggs	Pert Kelton
Dorrie Whitbred	Ellen McCown
Reverend Lapp	William Chapman
Thomas Clegg	Lee Cass
Amos Briggs	Bruce MacKay
Andrew	Grover Dale
Maidy	Elaine Swann
Martha Briggs	Lynn Brinker
Clara Clegg	Dortha Duckworth
Emma	Saralou Cooper

== Song list ==
Source: Internet Broadway database; AllMusic Playbill

Act I

- "A Day Borrowed from Heaven" - Gideon and the Villagers
- "The Music of Home" - Amos, Gideon, and the Villagers
- "Gideon Briggs, I Love You" - Gideon and Dorrie
- "The Autumn Courting" - The Villagers
- "The Call to Wander" - Amos
- "Summertime Love" - Gideon and the Villagers
- "Walking Away Whistling" - Dorrie
- "The Sermon" - Reverend Lapp and Reverend Birdsong
- "Could've Been a Ring" - Clegg and Gramma Briggs
- "Gideon Briggs, I Love You" (Reprise) - Dorrie
- "Halloweve" - Jabez, Andrews, and Young Villagers
- "Never Will I Marry" - Gideon
- "Greenwillow Christmas" - Martha and the Villagers

Act II

- "The Music of Home" (Reprise) - The Villagers
- "Faraway Boy" - Dorrie
- "Clang Dang the Bell" - Gideon, Gramma, Martha, Micah, Sheby, and Jabez
- "What a Blessing" - Reverend Birdsong
- "He Died Good" - The Villagers
- "The Spring Courting" - Andrew, Dorrie, and the Young Villagers
- "Summertime Love" (Reprise) - Gideon
- "What a Blessing" (Reprise) - Reverend Birdsong
- "The Call" - Gideon
- "The Music of Home" (Reprise) - Company

== Awards and nominations ==
The musical received 1960 Tony Award nominations:

- Best Actor in a Musical (Perkins)
- Best Featured Actress in a Musical (Pert Kelton)
- Best Scenic Design (Musical) (Peter Larkin)
- Best Costume Design (Alvin Colt)
- Best Choreography (Joe Layton)
- Best Conductor and Musical Director (Abba Bogin)
- Best Stage Technician (James Orr)

Cecil Kellaway won the Outer Critics Circle Award for Outstanding Actor in a Musical.

== Recordings ==
Bing Crosby recorded "The Music of Home" in 1960; for RCA Victor. Nancy Wilson recorded "Never Will I Marry" on Nancy Wilson and Cannonball Adderley (1962). Caterina Valente performed both "Summertime Love" and "Never Will I Marry" in 1963 for her album Valente in Swingtime.

Judy Garland performed "Never Will I Marry" frequently in the 1960s, including for her aborted 1962 album Judy Takes Broadway and on The Judy Garland Show. Barbra Streisand recorded "Never Will I Marry" for The Third Album in 1964, and sang it live in her early club act.

Linda Ronstadt recorded "Never Will I Marry" on her final solo studio album Hummin' to Myself in 2004.
