= Goswin Karl Uphues =

German philosopher (1841–1916)

Goswin Karl Uphues (13 March 1841 – 10 September 1916) was a German philosopher. He taught at a gymnasium in Aarau before becoming a professor at the University of Halle.

A collection of papers published by Uphues between 1869 and 1882 was edited by Kurt Flasch in 1973.

== Works ==
- Die definition des satzes: nach den Platonischen dialogen Kratylus, Theaetet. Sophistes, 1882.
- Grundlehren der logik. Nach Richard Shute's Discourse on truth, 1883.
- Wahrnehmung und Empfindung. Untersuchungen zur empirischen Psychologie, 1888.
- Über die Erinnerung: Untersuchungen zur empirischen Psychologie, 1889.
- Psychologie des Erkennens vom empirischen Standpunkte, 1893.
- Sokrates und Pestalozzi: zwei Vorträge bei Gelegenheit der Pestalozzifeier, 1896.
- Einführung in die moderne Logik, 1901.
- Zur Krisis in der Logik. Eine Auseinandersetzung mit Dr. Melchior Palágyi, 1903.
- Kant und seine Vorgänger. Was wir von ihnen lernen können, 1906.
- Erkenntniskritische Psychologie; Leitfaden für Vorlesungen, 1909.
- Geschichte der Philosophie als Erkenntniskritik: Leitfaden für Vorlesungen, 1909.
- Die sinnenwelt und ideenwelt, 1914.
- Sprachtheorie und Metaphysik bei Platon, Aristoteles und in der Scholastik, 1972. Edited by Kurt Flasch
