= Paloma Ford =

American R&B singer

- Born: August 1, 1986 (age 40); Long Beach, California, United States
- Genres: R&B; Hip hop
- Occupation: Singer/songwriter
- Years active: 2007–present

Paloma Ford (born August 1, 1986), is an American R&B vocalist. She sang backing vocals on Macy Gray's 2007 album Big and has collaborated with artists Meek Mill, Tory Lanez and Rick Ross. Her original songs include "W.E.T.," "Jada," and "Hit of You" from her 2016 EP Nearly Civizled.

== Career ==
Her musical influences include Michael and Janet Jackson, Prince, Nirvana, and Beyoncé. 2Pac, Aaliyah and Sade are among her favorite 5 artists of all time.

In 2013 she released music videos of two songs, "Ménage à Trois" and "Hit Of You", on YouTube. In 2014 she was featured on Meek Mill's single "I Don't Know" which peaked at #35 on Billboard's Hot R&B/Hip-Hop Songs chart and #21 on the Hot Rap Songs chart and in August released her song "Summer In California" featuring Snoop Dogg and Iamsu!.

In 2016 she released her first EP, Nearly Civilized, which included the songs "W.E.T." and "Jada." In 2017 she released the song "Waves" featuring Dave East.

In 2020 she released a second EP, X Tapes. L'Officiel called it "one of the most exciting projects to listen to". The lead track of the project, "All for Nothing" featuring Rick Ross, was highlighted by UPROXX as "the best R&B track released for the week" and "nothing short of dazzling" by Paper Magazine.

== Discography ==
=== EPs ===
- Nearly Civilized (2016)
- X Tapes (2020)

=== Singles ===
- "Dollars" (2012)
- "Mènage à Trois" (2013)
- "Right Now" (2013)
- "Hit Of You" (2013)
- "Lap Dance" (2014)
- "Let Me See" (feat. Meek Mill) (2014)
- "Summer In California" (feat. Snoop Dogg & Iamsu) (2014)
- "Jada" (2015)
- "Do It Again" (2015)
- "Wet" (2016)
- "That Shit Ain't Cool" (2017)
- "Waves" (feat. Dave East) (2017)
- "4 the Fame" (2018)
- "Rain" (2019)
- "Chrome" 'In My Feelings Version'(2020)
- "Nights I Cry" (2020)
- "All For Nothing"(feat. Rick Ross) (2020)
