= Shoot =

Shoot most commonly refers to:

- Shoot (botany), an immature plant or portion of a plant
- Shooting, the firing of projectile weapons
- Photo shoot, a photography session; an event wherein a photographer takes photographs

Shoot may also refer to:

== Arts and entertainment ==
=== Film and television ===
- The Shoot (film), a 1964 film directed by Robert Siodmak
- Shoot (film), a 1976 action thriller starring Cliff Robertson
- "Shoot" (Mad Men), a 2007 television episode

=== Periodicals ===
- Shoot (advertising magazine), an American magazine since 1990
- Shoot (football magazine), a British magazine 1969–2008
- Shoot, a self-published photography periodical by Paul Sepuya

=== Other media ===
- Shoot (Burden), a 1971 performance art piece by Chris Burden in which he was shot
- "Shoot" (Hellblazer), a story from the DC Comics series Hellblazer
- The Shoot (video game), a 2010 rail shooter game for the PlayStation 3
- "Shoot" (song), by BlocBoy JB
- "Shoot (Firecraker)", the lead single by Chaeyoung from Lil Fantasy Vol. 1
- "Shoot", a song by Boys Like Girls from Crazy World

== Wrestling ==
- Shoot (professional wrestling), an unplanned occurrence in a professional wrestling event
- Shoot wrestling, a combat sport
- Shoot wrestling, a synonym for Catch wrestling, a related combat sport
- Takedown (grappling), or shoot

== Other uses ==
- Shoot, a minced oath for "shit"

== See also ==
- Aoki Densetsu Shoot! or Blue Legend Shoot, a Japanese manga
- Chute (disambiguation)
- Shooter (disambiguation)
- Shooting (disambiguation)
- Shot (disambiguation)
