= Quebec Route 397 =

Highway in Quebec, Canada

Route 397

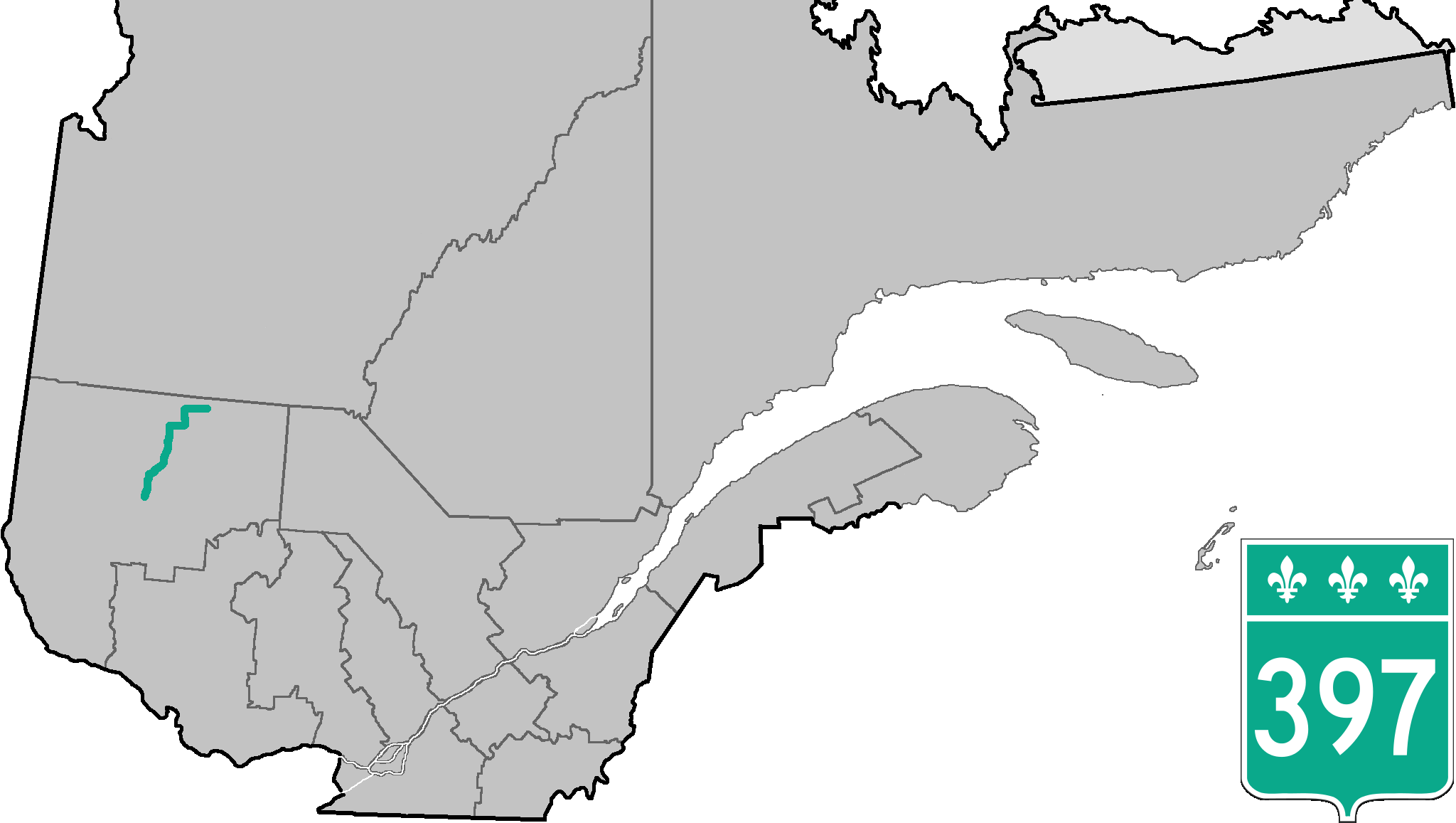

Route information
- Maintained by Transports Québec
- Length: 130 km (81 mi)

Major junctions
- South end: R-117 (TCH) in Val-d'Or
- North end: R-113 in Lac-Despinassy

Location
- Country: Canada
- Province: Quebec
- Major cities: Val-d'Or, Barraute

Highway system
- Quebec provincial highways; Autoroutes; List; Former
| ← R-395 | → R-399 |

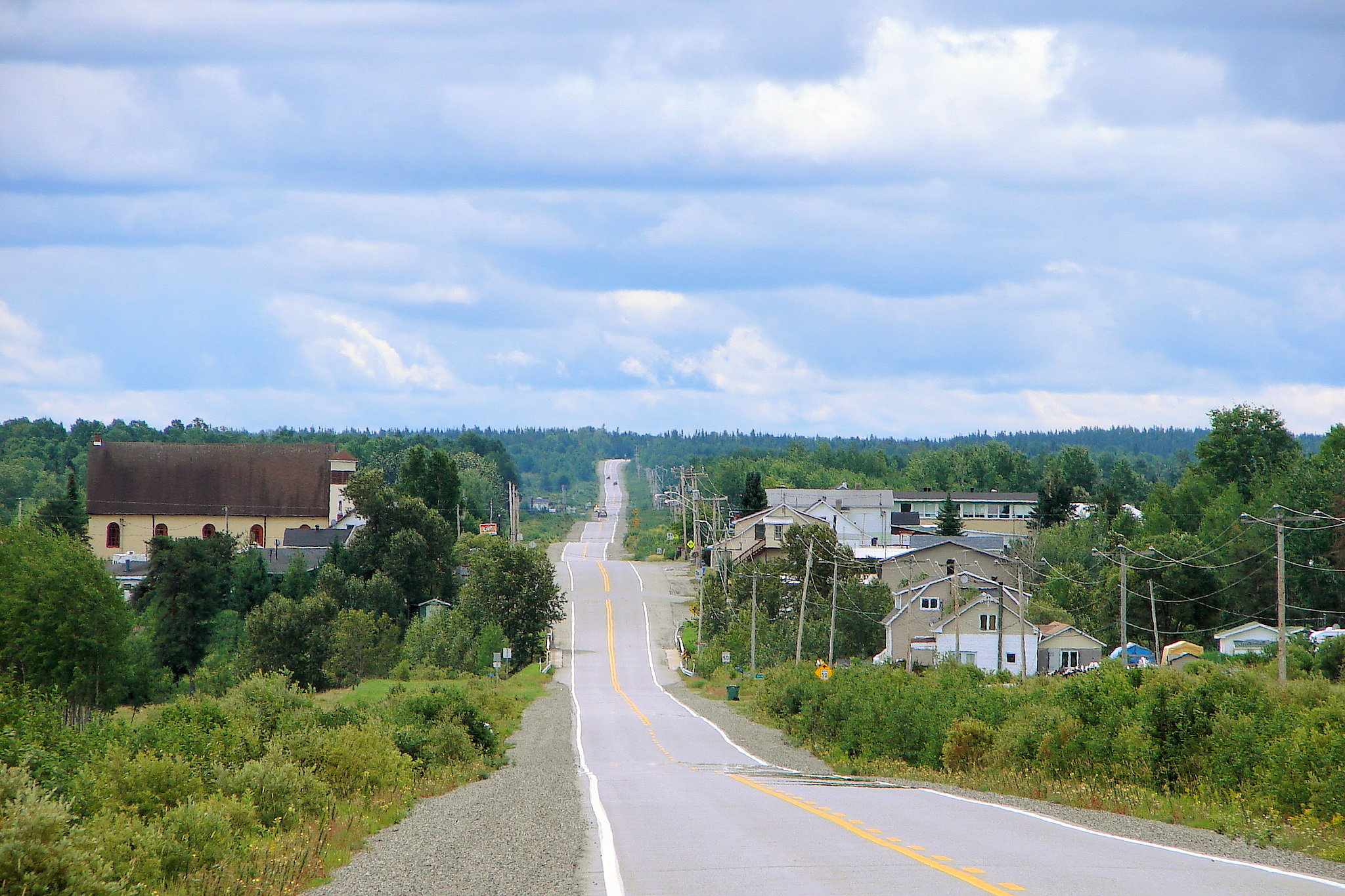
Route 397 through La Morandière-Rochebaucourt

Route 397 is a two-lane north/south highway located in the Abitibi-Témiscamingue region in Quebec, Canada. It starts at the junction of Route 117 in Val-d'Or and ends at the junction of Route 113 in Lac-Despinassy. It is also concurrent with Route 386 in Barraute.

== Municipalities along Route 397 ==
- Val-d'Or
- Barraute
- La Morandière-Rochebaucourt
- Lac-Despinassy

== See also ==
- List of Quebec provincial highways
