= La Morandière-Rochebaucourt =

- Municipality
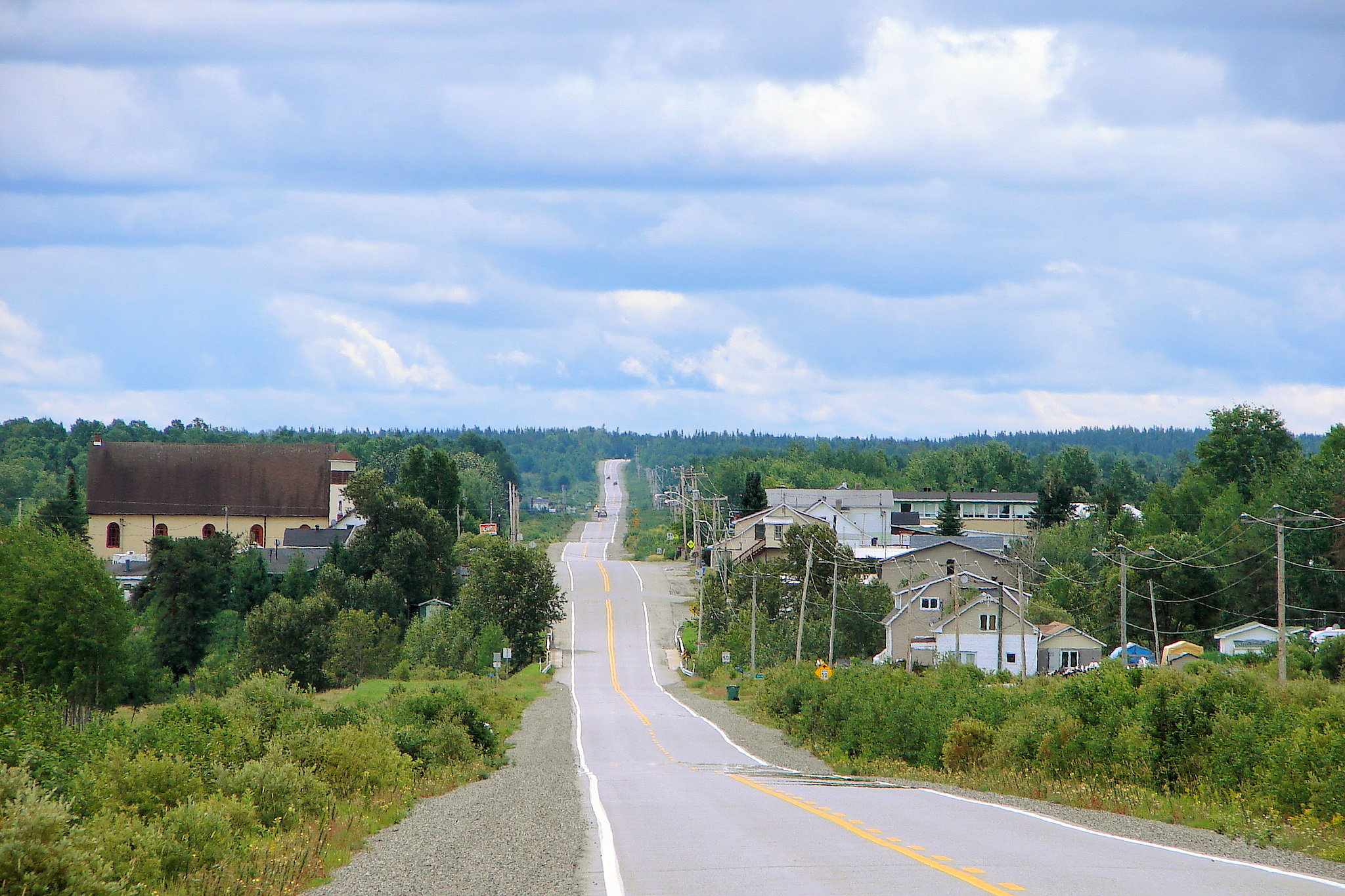
- La Morandière sector

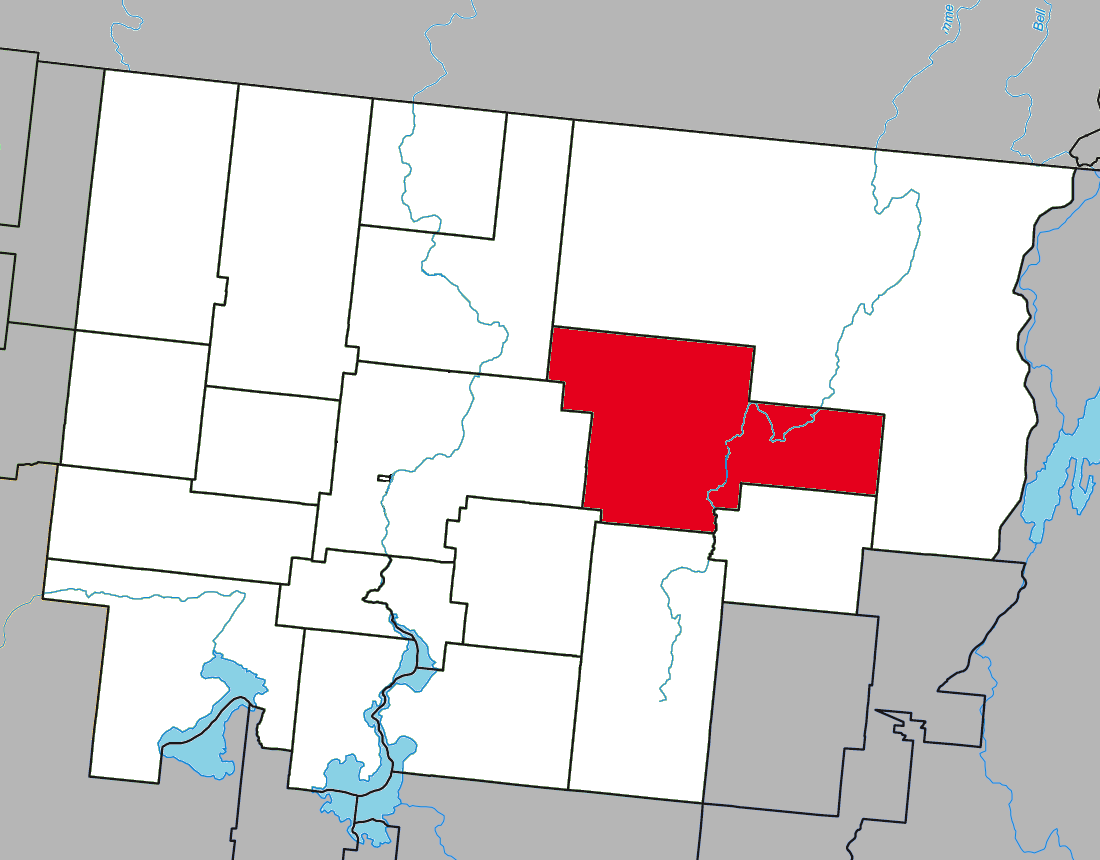
- Location within Abitibi RCM

- Location in western Quebec
- Coordinates: 48°36′N 77°38′W
- Country: Canada
- Province: Quebec
- Region: Abitibi-Témiscamingue
- RCM: Abitibi
- Constituted: January 1, 2023

Government
  - Mayor: Alain Trudel
  - Federal riding: Abitibi—Témiscamingue
  - Prov. riding: Abitibi-Ouest

Area
  - Total: 610.29 km^{2} (235.63 sq mi)
  - Land: 590.98 km^{2} (228.18 sq mi)

Population (2021)
  - Total: 351
  - Density: 0.6/km^{2} (1.6/sq mi)
  - Pop (2016-21): ▲3.8%
  - Dwellings: 181
- Time zone: UTC−05:00 (EST)
  - Summer (DST): UTC−04:00 (EDT)
- Postal code(s): J0Y 1S0, J0Y 2J0
- Area code: 819
- Highways: R-395 R-397
- Website: www.lamorandiere.ca

La Morandière-Rochebaucourt (French pronunciation: [la mɔʁɑ̃djɛʁ ʁɔʃbokuʁ]) is a municipality in the Canadian province of Quebec, located in the Abitibi Regional County Municipality. It is part of the Abitibi-Témiscamingue region and the population is 351 as of 2021.

The municipality was formed on January 1, 2023, through the amalgamation of La Morandière and Rochebaucourt. In addition to the two namesake population centres, the municipality also includes the hamlets of Castagnier (48°44′04″N 77°49′36″W) and Lac-Castagnier (48°42′48″N 77°44′29″W).

== History ==
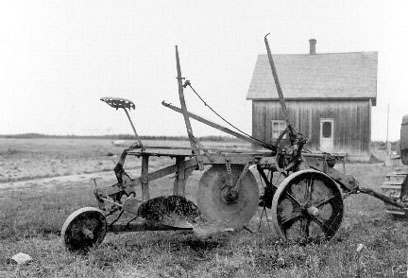
Rochebaucourt in September 1942

The location where La Morandière currently sits was initially settled in around 1916 by Émilien Plante, Uldéric Hardy and Charles Rochette but the territory didn't have any official status until January 1, 1983, the date when the municipality of La Morandière was founded.

In 1935 as part of the Vautrin Settlement Plan, Rochebaucourt was colonized by pioneers from Saint-Antoine-sur-Richelieu, Saint-Hyacinthe, and Salaberry-de-Valleyfield. It was first known as Colonie-33 but this was quickly replaced by Rochebaucourt, the name of the geographic township in which it is located. La Rochebaucourt was a cavalry captain of the Régiment de Languedoc in General Montcalm's army. In 1940, the Parish of Saint-Antoine-de-Rochebaucourt was established.

In 2022, it was decided to merge the two municipalities to form the new Municipality of La Morandière-Rochebaucourt.

== Demographics ==
Population trend:

- Population in 2021:
  - La Morandière: 205 (2016 to 2021 population change: -1.0%)
  - Rochebaucourt: 146 (2016 to 2021 population change: 11.2%)
- Population in 2016:
  - La Morandière: 207
  - Rochebaucourt: 131

Mother tongue (2021):

- English as first language: 0%
- French as first language: 98.6%
- English and French as first language: 1.4%
- Other as first language: 1.4%

== Government ==
Municipal council (as of 2023):

- Mayor: Alain Trudel
- Councillors: Louisette Dumas, Sylvie Leclerc, Michelle Sénéchal, Marc-Antoine Pelletier, Rémi Plamondon, Christiane Blouin

=== Political representation ===
La Morandière-Rochebaucourt federal election results
| Year | Liberal | | Conservative | | Bloc Québécois | | New Democratic | | Green | |
|---|---|---|---|---|---|---|---|---|---|---|
| 2021 | 28% | 50 | 13% | 23 | 46% | 82 | 4% | 8 | 2% | 3 |
| 2019 | 18% | 32 | 31% | 55 | 47% | 84 | 1% | 1 | 3% | 5 |

La Morandière-Rochebaucourt provincial election results
| Year | CAQ | | Liberal | | QC solidaire | | Parti Québécois | |
|---|---|---|---|---|---|---|---|---|
| 2018 | 42% | 81 | 8% | 16 | 13% | 26 | 26% | 50 |
| 2014 | 12% | 24 | 24% | 47 | 10% | 20 | 53% | 103 |

Federally, La Morandière-Rochebaucourt is part of the federal riding of Abitibi—Témiscamingue. In the 2021 Canadian federal election, the incumbent Sébastien Lemire of the Bloc Québécois was re-elected to represent the population La Morandière-Rochebaucourt in the House of Commons of Canada.

Provincially it is part of the riding of Abitibi-Ouest. In the 2022 Quebec general election the incumbent MNA Suzanne Blais, of the Coalition Avenir Québec, was re-elected to represent the population of La Morandière-Rochebaucourt in the National Assembly of Quebec.
