= Rivière du Moulin (Alick River tributary) =

River in Chaudière-Appalaches, Quebec, Canada

Alick River
- Location within Quebec
- Native name: Rivière Alick (French)

Location
- Country: Canada
- Province: Quebec
- Region: Chaudière-Appalaches
- MRC: Montmagny Regional County Municipality

Physical characteristics
- Source: Mountain and forest stream
  - location: Saint-Paul-de-Montminy
  - coordinates: 46.732774°N 70.290532°W
  - elevation: 643 metres (2,110 ft)
- Mouth: Alick River
  - location: Saint-Paul-de-Montminy
  - coordinates: 46.78361°N 70.37917°W
  - elevation: 382 metres (1,253 ft)
- Length: 7.4 kilometres (4.6 mi)

Basin features
- Progression: Alick River, Rivière du Sud (Montmagny), St. Lawrence River
- Tributaries
  - left: (upstream)
  - right: (upstream) Cours d'eau Blais

The rivière du Moulin (in English: Mill River) crosses the municipality of Saint-Paul-de-Montminy, in the Montmagny Regional County Municipality, in the administrative region of Chaudière-Appalaches, in Quebec, in Canada.

The confluence of the Moulin river constitutes the source of the Alick River which flows on the south bank of the Rivière du Sud (Montmagny); the latter first flows southwest, then northeast to the south shore of the St. Lawrence River.

== Geography ==
The main neighboring watersheds of the Moulin river are ː

- north side: Alick River, Dominique stream;
- east side: rivière des Cèdres, Noire North-West River;
- south side: Gabriel River;
- west side: rivière du Pin.

The river of the Moulin takes its source from a small lake on the northern slope of a mountain of Notre Dame Mountains, in the fifth rang, north of the village of Saint-Paul-de-Montminy. This source is located on the east side of route 283 and 6.0 kilometres (3.7 mi) east of the center of the village of Saint-Paul-de-Montminy.

From its source, the Moulin river "flows over 13.6 kilometres (8.5 mi) according to the following segments:

- 2.8 kilometres (1.7 mi) north, then west, to the fifth rang road;
- 3.0 kilometres (1.9 mi) west, to Highway 283 South;
- 2.8 kilometres (1.7 mi) north-west, crossing route 216 and along 2e rang road (on the west side), to the path of third rang;
- 2.6 kilometres (1.6 mi) north-west, up to the 1er rang road;
- 2.4 kilometres (1.5 mi), up to its confluence which also constitutes the confluence of the Dominique stream. These two confluences form the source of the Alick River.

The confluence of the Moulin River "is located almost at the limit of the municipalities of Notre-Dame-du-Rosaire and Saint-Paul-de-Montminy. This confluence is located at 7.3 kilometres (4.5 mi) south of the center of the village of Notre-Dame-du-Rosaire, at 5.3 kilometres (3.3 mi) east of the village of Sainte-Euphémie-sur-Rivière-du-Sud and 7.1 kilometres (4.4 mi) north of the center of the village of Saint-Paul-de-Montminy.

== Toponymy ==
The toponym Rivière du Moulin was made official on December 5, 1968, at the Commission de toponymie du Québec.

== See also ==
- List of rivers of Quebec
