= Rivière du Sud (Montmagny) =

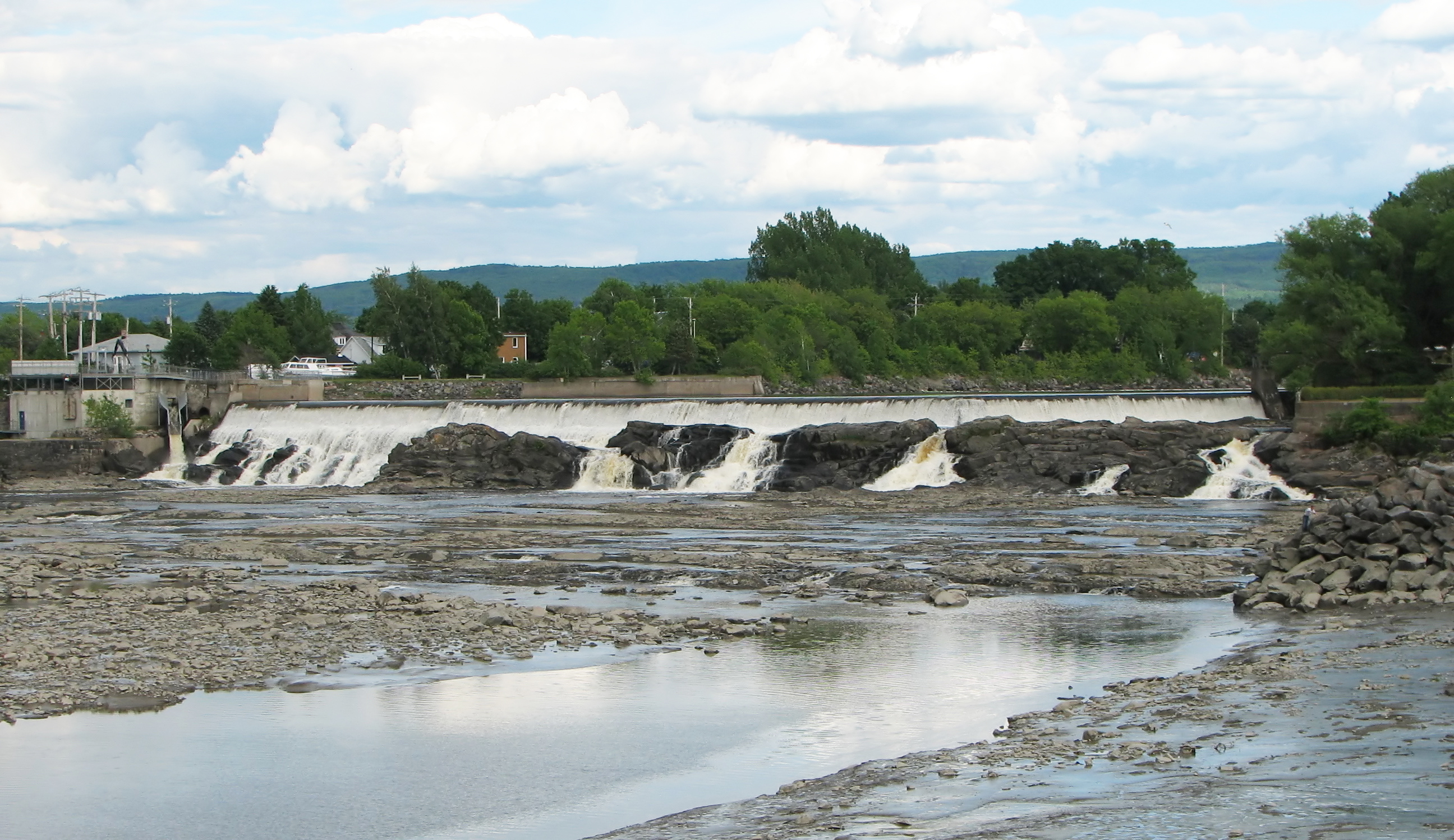

Location
- Country: Canada
- Province: Quebec
- Region: Chaudière-Appalaches
- Regional County Municipality: Montmagny Regional County Municipality

Physical characteristics
- Source: Forested streams
  - location: Notre-Dame-du-Rosaire
  - coordinates: 46.850956°N 70.334979°E
  - elevation: 440 m (1,440 ft)
- Mouth: Saint Lawrence River
  - location: Montmagny
  - coordinates: 46.98611°N 70.55083°W
  - elevation: 4 m (13 ft)
- Length: 86.5 km (53.7 mi)

Basin features
- Tributaries
  - left: (Upstream) Rivière du Vieux Moulin, Bras Saint-Michel, Rivière du Moulin, cemetery stream, outlet of the lake at Beaulieu, Roy stream, Fourche River, rivière du Pin, rivière à la Loutre, Alick River, Fraser River.
  - right: (Upstream) Bras Saint-Nicolas, Prairies stream, Rousseau stream, Blague stream, Miscou stream, Morigeau River, Campagna-Théberge stream, Théberge stream, Little Sainte-Marguerite River, Noire River, Isabelle stream, Beaver outlet, Laflamme outlet, Grand Ruisseau, Ferré stream.

The rivière du Sud (French pronunciation: [ʁivjɛʁ dy syd], "River of the South") is a tributary of the south shore of the Saint Lawrence River. This watercourse flows in the municipalities of Notre-Dame-du-Rosaire, Sainte-Euphémie-sur-Rivière-du-Sud, Armagh, Saint-Raphaël, Saint-François-de-la-Rivière-du-Sud, Saint-Pierre-de-la-Rivière-du-Sud and Montmagny, in the Montmagny Regional County Municipality, in the administrative region of Chaudière-Appalaches, in the province of Quebec, in Canada.

== Geography ==
The South River has its source in rang Saint-Thomas, in the township of D'Ashburton, in the municipality of Notre- Dame-du-Rosaire 25 km south-east of Montmagny. This source is located in a forest and mountain area on the southwest slope of a mountain. The south river "first flows south-east along the Appalachian mountain lines, then makes a large curve towards the north-east to orient itself more or less parallel to the south bank of the Saint Lawrence River.

From its source, the South River flows on 86.5 km, with a drop of 436 metres (1,430 ft), divided into the following segments:

Upper course of the river (50.6 km segment)

- 4.8 km to the southwest, passing south of the Montagne aux Érables, to the southwest limit of the township of Ashburton;
- 2.1 km southwest by collecting the waters of the Fraser River (coming from the southeast), up to Principale Street, which it cuts to 0.7 km northwest of the village center of Notre-Dame-du-Rosaire;
- 4.9 km to the southwest in Notre-Dame-du-Rosaire, collecting the waters of the Ferré stream (coming from the north) and the waters of the Alick River (coming from the south-east), up to the limit of Sainte-Euphémie-sur-Rivière-du-Sud;
- 4.2 km south-west in the canton of Montminy, to Route de la Station;
- 6.3 km to the southwest by collecting the waters of the rivière à la Loutre (coming from the east), up to the limit of the municipality of Armagh;
- 3.5 km south-west, up to the confluence of the rivière du Pin (coming from the south);
- 6.1 km south-west, up to the confluence of the Fourche River (coming from the south);
- 1.2 km west, to the route 281 Sud bridge, which it crosses 2.0 km southwest of the village center of Armagh;
- 4.4 km westward, collecting the waters of Matteau Creek (coming from the south), to the road of the 1st range North-West;
- 6.5 km north-west in the municipality of Armagh, collecting the water from the outlet (coming from the south) from Lac à Beaulieu and Lac Duchesnay, to the limit of Saint-Raphaël;
- 0.8 km north-west, up to the confluence of the Noire River (coming from the north-east);
- 5.9 km north-west, collecting the waters of the cemetery stream (coming from the south), Isabelle stream (coming from the north), the Beaver lake outlet (coming from the north), the lake outlet at La Hache (coming from the north), to the route 281 bridge;

Lower course of the river (35.9 km segment)

- 3.7 km north, to the Côte du Moulin bridge, located east of the village of Saint-Raphaël;
- 4.4 km north-west, to the Rang du Sault bridge, located in the hamlet of Arthurville;
- 1.8 km northeast in Saint-Raphaël, to the limit of Saint-François-de-la-Rivière-du-Sud;
- 2.6 km north-east, collecting the waters of Bras Saint-Michel (coming from the south), to the "Montée de la Rivière-du-Sud" road bridge;
- 7.4 km north-east, to the Montée de Morigeau bridge;
- 2.0 km to the northeast, collecting the waters of the Morigeau River (coming from the south), to the municipal limit of Saint-Pierre-de-la-Rivière-du-Sud;
- 4.2 km north-east, crossing Principale Street, to the municipal limit of Montmagny;
- 6.8 km east to the highway 20 bridge;
- 2.6 km north-east, to route 132;
- 0.4 km north, to its confluence.

At the end of its course, after having crossed a fall from a height of seven meters, the South River flows into Le Bassin, on the long strike of the Banc de Saint-Thomas, on the south bank of the St. Lawrence River, in the heart of the village of Montmagny. This confluence which includes the bird sanctuary of Montmagny is located opposite the channel of Saint-Thomas.

== Toponymy ==
Probably called "S. Antoine river" by Samuel de Champlain on his 1632 map, and "R. de S. Anthome" by Jean Boisseau, in 1643, the South river "seems to appear on the map from Jean Bourdon, drawn up around 1641, in the form of Grande Rivière du Sud. The act of concession of the seigneury of Rivière-du-Sud to Charles Huault de Montmagny, in 1646, expressly states "the river called from the South to the point where it discharges into the Saint Lawrence River. Very stable thereafter, the toponym is part of the official designation of three municipalities drained by this course of water: Saint-Pierre-de-la-Rivière-du-Sud, Saint-François-de-la-Rivière-du-Sud and Sainte-Euphémie-sur-Rivière-du-Sud.

The toponym Rivière du Sud was formalized on December 5, 1968 at the Commission de toponymie du Québec.

=== See also ===
- St. Lawrence River
- Notre-Dame-du-Rosaire, a municipality
- Sainte-Euphémie-sur-Rivière-du-Sud, a municipality
- Armagh, a municipality
- Saint-Raphaël, a municipality
- Saint-François-de-la-Rivière-du-Sud, a municipality
- Saint-Pierre-de-la-Rivière-du-Sud, a municipality
- Montmagny, a municipality
- Montmagny Regional County Municipality
- List of rivers of Quebec
