= Minguy River =

River in Chaudière-Appalaches, Quebec, Canada

- Location within Quebec
- Native name: Rivière Minguy (French)

Location
- Country: Canada
- Province: Quebec
- Region: Chaudière-Appalaches
- MRC: Montmagny Regional County Municipality

Physical characteristics
- Source: Agricultural streams
  - location: Montmagny
  - coordinates: 46.949522°N 70.460614°W
  - elevation: 324 metres (1,063 ft)
- Mouth: Rivière du Sud (Montmagny)
  - location: Montmagny
  - coordinates: 49.934116°N 70.603845°W
  - elevation: 13 metres (43 ft)
- Length: 23.1 kilometres (14.4 mi)

Basin features
- Progression: Rivière du Sud (Montmagny), St. Lawrence River
- Tributaries
  - left: (upstream) ruisseau de la Blague
  - right: (upstream)

The Minguy river is a tributary of the southeast bank of the rivière du Sud (Montmagny), which flows northeast to the south bank of the St. Lawrence River.

The Minguy River flows in the municipality of Montmagny, in the Montmagny Regional County Municipality, in the region administrative office of Chaudière-Appalaches, in Quebec, in Canada.

== Geography ==
The main neighboring watersheds of the Minguy River are:

- north side: rivière des Perdrix, Bras Saint-Nicolas, rivière du Sud (Montmagny), St. Lawrence River;
- east side: rivière des Perdrix, Bras Saint-Nicolas;
- south side: Poitras River, Morigeau River;
- west side: rivière du Sud (Montmagny).

The Minguy River has its source in the eastern part of the municipality of Montmagny, near the limit of Cap-Saint-Ignace.

From its source, the Minguy River flows over 23.1 kilometres (14.4 mi), with a drop of 311 metres (1,020 ft), divided into the following segments:

- 6.2 kilometres (3.9 mi) heading west in Montmagny, to route 283;
- 3.5 kilometres (2.2 mi) north-west, up to the Trans-Comté road;
- 5.0 kilometres (3.1 mi) south-east, up to a road in Montmagny;
- 5.3 kilometres (3.3 mi) southwest, to a road;
- 2.4 kilometres (1.5 mi) north to a road;
- 0.7 kilometres (0.43 mi) north-west, up to its confluence.

The Minguy River flows onto the south bank of the rivière du Sud (Montmagny). This confluence is located upstream from the highway 20 bridge, downstream from the confluence of the Miscou stream and downstream from the rue Principale bridge.

== Toponymy ==
The toponym Minguy River was formalized on December 5, 1968, at the Commission de toponymie du Québec.

== See also ==
- List of rivers of Quebec
