= Little Sainte-Marguerite River =

River in Chaudière-Appalaches, Quebec (Canada)

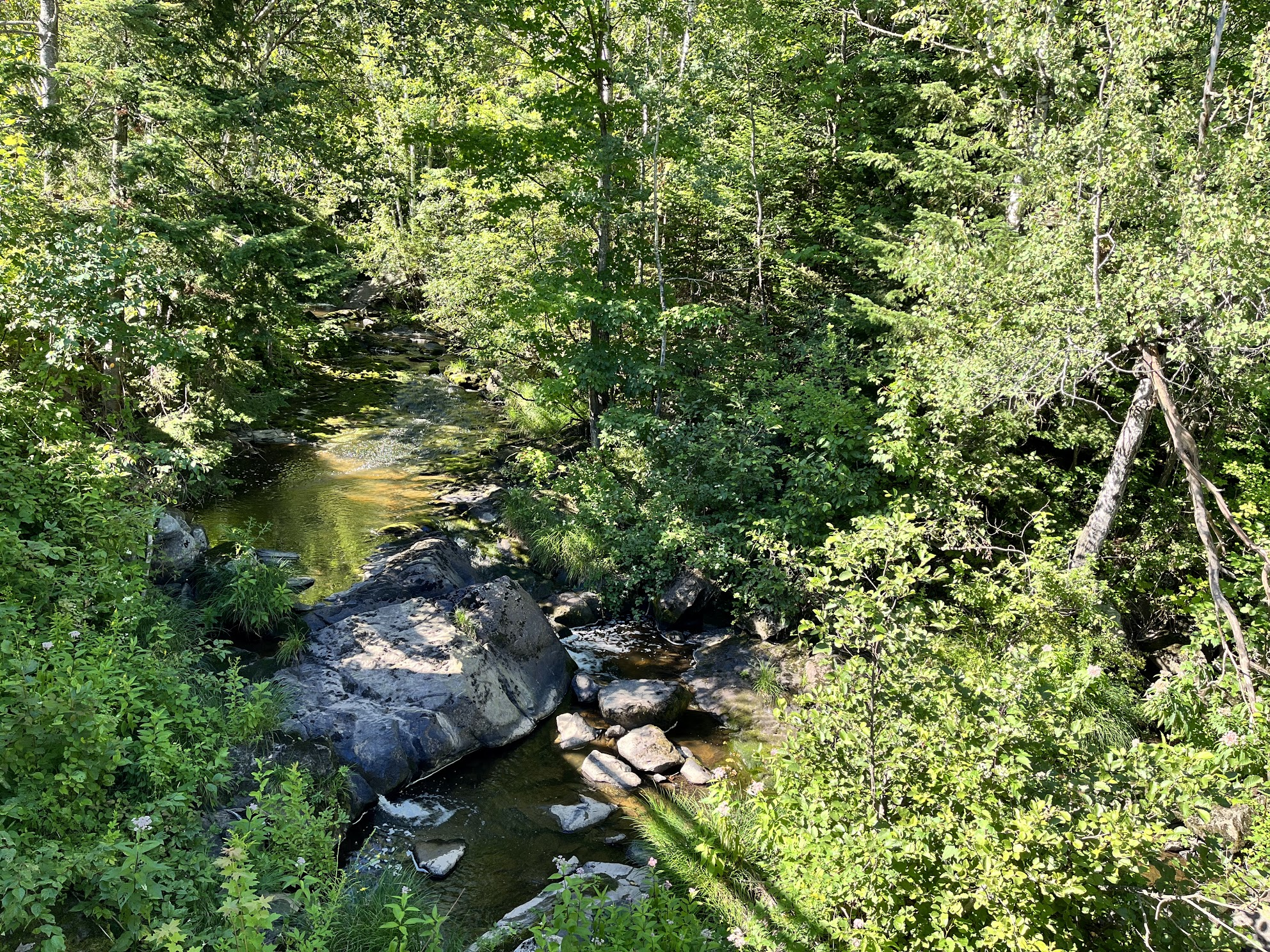

- Location within Quebec
- Native name: Petite rivière Sainte-Marguerite (French)

Location
- Country: Canada
- Province: Quebec
- Region: Chaudière-Appalaches
- MRC: Bellechasse Regional County Municipality

Physical characteristics
- Source: Forest stream
  - location: Saint-Paul-de-Montminy
  - coordinates: 46.824112°N 70.645039°W
  - elevation: 265 metres (869 ft)
- Mouth: Rivière du Sud (Montmagny)
  - location: Saint-Raphaël
  - coordinates: 46.80722°N 70.7325°W
  - elevation: 122 metres (400 ft)
- Length: 11.0 kilometres (6.8 mi)

Basin features
- Progression: Rivière du Sud (Montmagny), St. Lawrence River
- Tributaries
  - left: (upstream)
  - right: (upstream) Branche Rémillard

The Petite rivière Sainte-Marguerite (in English: Little Sainte-Marguerite River) crosses the municipalities of Saint-François-de-la-Rivière-du-Sud (MRC of Montmagny Regional County Municipality) and Saint-Raphaël (MRC de Bellechasse Regional County Municipality), in the administrative region of Chaudière-Appalaches, in Quebec, in Canada.

The "Petite rivière Sainte-Marguerite" is a tributary of the north bank of the rivière du Sud (Montmagny) which flows nord-west, then north-east to the south bank of St. Lawrence River.

== Geography ==
The "Little Sainte-Marguerite river" has its source in a mountainous area in the municipality of Saint-François-de-la-Rivière-du-Sud, located in the Notre Dame Mountains.

From its source, the "Petite rivière Sainte-Marguerite" flows in a forest zone over 11.0 kilometres (6.8 mi) with a drop of 143 metres (469 ft), according to the following segments:

- 1.8 kilometres (1.1 mi) towards the north-west;
- 2.6 kilometres (1.6 mi) south-west, then north-west;
- 1.0 kilometre (0.62 mi) towards the south-west, to the confluence of a stream coming from the south-east;
- 3.7 kilometres (2.3 mi) south-west, up to a forest road;
- 1.9 kilometres (1.2 mi) towards the southwest, until its confluence.

The "Petite rivière Sainte-Marguerite" empties on the north shore of the rivière du Sud (Montmagny) between two series of falls and downstream of the Saint-Raphaël.

== Toponymy ==
The toponym "Petite rivière Sainte-Marguerite" was made official on July 10, 1969, at the Commission de toponymie du Québec.

== See also ==
- List of rivers of Quebec
