= Bras Saint-Michel =

River in Chaudière-Appalaches, Quebec (Canada)

- Location within Quebec

Location
- Country: Canada
- Province: Quebec
- Region: Chaudière-Appalaches
- MRC: Bellechasse Regional County Municipality and Montmagny Regional County Municipality

Physical characteristics
- Source: Agricultural streams
  - location: Saint-Henri
  - coordinates: 46.701236°N 70.932625°W
  - elevation: 98 metres (322 ft)
- Mouth: Rivière du Sud (Montmagny)
  - location: Saint-François-de-la-Rivière-du-Sud
  - coordinates: 46.85444°N 70.73639°W
  - elevation: 35 metres (115 ft)
- Length: 26.6 kilometres (16.5 mi)

Basin features
- Progression: Rivière du Sud (Montmagny), St. Lawrence River
- Tributaries
  - left: (upstream) cours d'eau Labonté, cours d'eau Latulippe, ruisseau des Castors.
  - right: (upstream) cours d'eau Boulet, ruisseau-à-la-Loutre, ruisseau de la Chute, rivière du Moulin (Bras Saint-Michel), ruisseau Plante.

The Bras Saint-Michel is a tributary of the north-west bank of the Rivière du Sud (Montmagny) which flows north-east to the south bank of the St. Lawrence River, in the administrative region of Chaudière-Appalaches, in Quebec, in Canada.

The "Bras Saint-Michel" crosses the MRC of:

- Bellechasse Regional County Municipality: municipalities of Saint-Henri, Saint-Gervais, Saint-Charles-de-Bellechasse, La Durantaye, Saint-Raphaël, Saint-Vallier;
- Montmagny Regional County Municipality: municipality of Saint-François-de-la-Rivière-du-Sud.

== Geography ==
The Saint-Michel arm has its source in the municipality of Saint-Henri at 3.8 kilometres (2.4 mi) west of the center of the village of Saint-Gervais, at 7.9 kilometres (4.9 mi) north of the center of the village of Saint-Anselme and at 9.5 kilometres (5.9 mi) east of center of the village of Saint-Henri. This spring is located in an agricultural zone north of the Boyer River and northwest of the first rang West road. The "Bras Saint-Michel" flows relatively in a straight line north-east in parallel (on the south-east side) over the Boyer river.

From its source, the Saint-Michel arm flows over 26.6 kilometres (16.5 mi), divided into the following segments:

- 0.8 kilometres (0.50 mi) northeasterly in Saint-Henri, up to the limit of Saint-Charles-de-Bellechasse;
- 0.8 kilometres (0.50 mi) towards the northeast, forming the limit between these last two municipalities;
- 2.9 kilometres (1.8 mi) northeasterly to route 279 which it intersects at 1.6 kilometres (0.99 mi) north-west of center of the village of Saint-Gervais;
- 1.1 kilometres (0.68 mi) north-east to the limit of Saint-Gervais;
- 5.2 kilometres (3.2 mi) northeasterly, forming the limit of the municipalities of Saint-Gervais and Saint-Charles-de-Bellechasse, up to the road bridge to La Tremblade, that is to at the limit of La Durantaye;
- 2.5 kilometres (1.6 mi) towards the north-east, forming the limit between La Durantaye and Saint-Gervais;
- 3.7 kilometres (2.3 mi) northeasterly, forming the limit between La Durantaye and Saint-Raphaël, to the route Robert bridge;
- 3.2 kilometres (2.0 mi) north-east, up to the route 281 South bridge that it intersects at 3.9 kilometres (2.4 mi) at north-west of the center of the village of Saint-Raphaël;
- 4.1 kilometres (2.5 mi) towards the northeast, forming on 3.5 kilometres (2.2 mi) the limit between Saint-Vallier and Saint-Raphaël, until 'at the limit of Saint-François-de-la-Rivière-du-Sud;
- 2.3 kilometres (1.4 mi) northeasterly in Saint-François-de-la-Rivière-du-Sud, to its confluence.

The "Bras Saint-Michel" empties on the north-west bank of the Rivière du Sud (Montmagny) in the municipality of Saint-François-de-la-Rivière-du-Sud. This confluence is located 3.8 kilometres (2.4 mi) south of highway 20, at 0.3 kilometres (0.19 mi) upstream of the Montée de Morigeau and 4.1 kilometres (2.5 mi) downstream from the Rang du Sault bridge, located in the hamlet of Arthurville.

== Toponymy ==
The toponym "Bras Saint-Michel" was made official on December 5, 1968, at the Commission de toponymie du Québec.

== See also ==
- List of rivers of Quebec
