= Rivière à la Loutre (rivière du Sud tributary) =

River in Quebec, Canada

Location
- Country: Canada
- Province: Quebec
- Region: Chaudière-Appalaches
- Regional County Municipality: Montmagny Regional County Municipality

Physical characteristics
- Source: Forest and mountain streams
  - location: Saint-Paul-de-Montminy
  - coordinates: 46°44′48″N 70°23′36″W
  - elevation: 435 m (1,427 ft)
- Mouth: Rivière du Sud (Montmagny)
  - location: Sainte-Euphémie-sur-Rivière-du-Sud
  - coordinates: 46°46′04″N 70°28′12″W
  - elevation: 202 m (663 ft)
- Length: 7.0 km (4.3 mi)

Basin features
- Progression: Rivière du Sud (Montmagny), Saint Lawrence River
- Tributaries
  - left: (upstream)
  - right: (upstream)

The rivière à la Loutre (English: Otter River) crosses the municipalities of Saint-Paul-de-Montminy and Sainte-Euphémie-sur-Rivière-du-Sud, in the Montmagny Regional County Municipality, in the administrative region of Chaudière-Appalaches, in the province of Quebec, in Canada.

Rivière à la Loutre is a tributary of the south shore of the rivière du Sud (Montmagny) which flows first southwest, then northeast to the south shore of Saint Lawrence River.

== Geography ==
The Loutre river has its source in a mountainous area in the first rang of the municipality of Saint-Paul-de-Montminy in the Notre Dame Mountains.

From its source, the Rivière à la Loutre "flows through a valley steeped in 7.0 km (4.3 mi) according to the following segments:

- 2.7 km (1.7 mi) north-west, up to rang Sainte-Anne-Ouest road;
- 2.8 km (1.7 mi) west, crossing the Sirois-Sud road, to the main west street that it intersects at 1.2 km (0.75 mi) southwest of the center the village of Sainte-Euphémie-sur-Rivière-du-Sud;
- 1.5 km (0.93 mi) towards the west, collecting a stream (coming from the east), until its confluence.

Rivière à la Loutre empties onto the south shore of the Rivière du Sud (Montmagny) near the boundary of the municipalities of Armagh and Sainte-Euphémie-sur-Rivière-du-Sud.

== Toponymy ==
This toponym appears on a map dated 1952.

The toponym Rivière à la Loutre was formalized on December 5, 1968, at the Commission de toponymie du Québec.

== See also ==
- List of rivers of Quebec
