= Zec de l'Oie-Blanche-de-Montmagny =

- Location within Quebec
- Location: Canada, Quebec, Montmagny Regional County Municipality
- Nearest city: Montmagny
- Coordinates: 47°00′N 70°34′W
- Area: 8.4 square kilometres (3.2 sq mi)
- Established: 1987
- Governing body: Société d'aménagement de conservation des oiseaux migrateurs (SACOMM)
- Website: pages.globetrotter.net/sacomm/zec.htm

The ZEC Oie-Blanche-de-Montmagny is a "zone d'exploitation contrôlée" (controlled harvesting zone) (ZEC) in the municipality of Montmagny, in Montmagny Regional County Municipality (MRC), in the administrative region of Chaudière-Appalaches, in Quebec, in Canada.

Provincial court (via the Department of Wildlife and Parks of Quebec), the ZEC was incorporated on June 1, 1987 and is the only one in the Quebec for hunting migratory birds. The management of migratory bird conservation Corporation (SACOMM) administers the activities and development of the zone d'exploitation contrôlée of white goose in Montmagny.

== Geography ==
The territory of the ZEC covers on 8.4 square kilometres (3.2 sq mi) all flats water zone in Montmagny (east to west). The territory is intersected by bird Montmagny shelter which is administered by the Canadian Wildlife Service. The SACOMM landscaped rest areas and west to the eastern limits of the ZEC, providing a migratory bird stopover, allowing them to eat, to socialize and relax in non chased territory.

Annually in October, the White Goose Festival of Montmagny is particularly popular. Montmagny is also a prime spot for watching shorebirds. The bird Montmagny refuge is one of 28 migratory bird sanctuaries located in the Quebec.

== Hunting ==
The ZEC, the "White Goose Hunting" starts at the same time as the hunting of migratory birds.

To accommodate the hunting, caches were built, including a lookout for high tide and low tide looking for. On the territory of the ZEC, each cache can accommodate four hunters. The booking caches is based on the principle of "first come, first served."

'Equipment and hunting accessories'

Hunters can book the services of an experienced, to facilitate the practice of safe hunting, providing advice and guiding hunters guide. The SACOMM recommends that hunters wear warm and waterproof clothing, preferably patterned camouflage and a hunting hat and makeup type "camo" or face mask, camouflage nets and waders or boots-pants, callers "Grande snow Goose" (not provided by ZEC) and decoys. It is required for each hunter to carry the license to hunt small game (provincial) and allowed for hunting migratory birds (federal).

'Labelling geese'

Hunters are advised to check the legs of slaughtered geese, or young adults, the presence of a label webbing. These unique code labels are placed on youth in the Arctic (Bylot Island, Nunavut). The labelling enables stakeholders Wildlife Service to estimate the number of goslings who survive their first migration south. Hunters are asked to report the code displayed on the label of webbing (or a ring or necklace), and the location and date of capture.

== Toponymy ==
The name "Zec de l'Oie-Blanche-de-Montmagny" is directly related to the specialized mission of the ZEC, the protection and control of this species of bird. The biannual stop of tens of thousands of snow geese attracts thousands of tourists. In Montmagny, the theme of the goose is transposed in the name of several hotel, restaurants and institutions. Designations such as l'Oiselière, la Couvée (Brood), l'Oie Blanche (snow goose) are references to the staging geese in their journey of thousands of kilometers.

In Canada, snow goose is rather designated "oie des neiges" (white goose). The name "Zec de l'Oie-Blanche-de-Montmagny" was made official on August 6, 1987 at the Bank of place names in the Commission de toponymie du Québec (Geographical Names Board of Quebec)

== See also ==
- Montmagny, municipality
- Montmagny Regional County Municipality (RCM)
- Chaudière-Appalaches, administrative region of Quebec
- Snow goose
- Goose
- Zone d'exploitation contrôlée (Controlled harvesting zone) (ZEC)
