= Montagne aux Érables =

Mountain in Canada

Highest point
- Elevation: 455 m (1,493 ft)
- Coordinates: 46°50′28″N 70°23′29″W

Geography
- Location: Notre-Dame-du-Rosaire
- Country: Canada
- Province: Quebec
- Administrative region: Chaudière-Appalaches
- MRC: Montmagny Regional County Municipality

The Montagne aux Érables (in English: maple mountain) is a mountain located at Notre-Dame-du-Rosaire, in the Montmagny Regional County Municipality (MRC), in administrative region of Chaudière-Appalaches, in Quebec, Canada.

== Geography ==
This mountain is part of Notre Dame Mountains.

== Toponymy ==
His name was made official on December 6, 1970 at the "Banque des noms de lieux" of Commission de toponymie du Québec.

== See also ==
- List of mountains of Quebec
