= Alick River =

River in Chaudière-Appalaches, Quebec (Canada)

- Location within Quebec
- Native name: Rivière Alick (French)

Location
- Country: Canada
- Province: Quebec
- Region: Chaudière-Appalaches
- MRC: Bellechasse Regional County Municipality

Physical characteristics
- Source: Mountain and forest stream
  - location: Saint-Paul-de-Montminy
  - coordinates: 46.783847°N 70.379536°W
  - elevation: 383 metres (1,257 ft)
- Mouth: Rivière du Sud (Montmagny)
  - location: Notre-Dame-du-Rosaire
  - coordinates: 46.8075°N 70.43222°W
  - elevation: 315 metres (1,033 ft)
- Length: 7.4 kilometres (4.6 mi)

Basin features
- Progression: Rivière du Sud (Montmagny), St. Lawrence River
- Tributaries
  - left: (upstream) Ruisseau Dominique
  - right: (upstream)

The Alick River (in French: rivière Alick) crosses the municipalities of Saint-Paul-de-Montminy and Notre-Dame-du-Rosaire, in the Montmagny Regional County Municipality, in the administrative region of Chaudière-Appalaches, in Québec, in Canada.

The Alick River is a tributary of the south bank of the Rivière du Sud (Montmagny) which flows first southwest, then northeast to the south bank of St. Lawrence River.

== Toponymy ==
The toponym Rivière Alick was formalized on December 5, 1968, at the Commission de toponymie du Québec.

== See also ==
- List of rivers of Quebec
