= Rivière du Moulin =

Rivière du Moulin (English: River of the Mill) may refer to:

== Rivers ==
- Rivière du Moulin (Deschambault-Grondines), a tributary of the Saint Lawrence river in Capitale-Nationale, Quebec, Canada
- Rivière du Moulin (Saguenay River tributary), Saguenay-Lac-Saint-Jean, Quebec, Canada
- Rivière du Moulin (Baie-Saint-Paul), a tributary of Saint-Paul Bay on the northwest shore of the St. Lawrence River in the Charlevoix Regional County Municipality, Capitale-Nationale, Quebec, Canada
- Rivière du Moulin (île d'Orléans), a tributary of the Saint Lawrence River, in Saint-Laurent-de-l'Île-d'Orléans, in Capitale-Nationale, Quebec, Canada
- Rivière du Moulin (Bécancour River tributary), Saint-Louis-de-Blandford, Arthabaska Regional County Municipality, Centre-du-Québec, Québec, Canada
- Rivière du Moulin (Gentilly), a tributary of the Saint Lawrence river in the area of Gentilly, Quebec, Canada
- Rivière du Moulin (Beauceville), a tributary of the Chaudière River in Chaudière-Appalaches, Quebec, Canada
- Rivière du Moulin (Bras Saint-Michel), Chaudière-Appalaches, Quebec, Canada
- Rivière du Moulin (Alick River tributary), Chaudière-Appalaches, Quebec, Canada

== Other ==
- Rivière-du-Moulin Ecological Reserve, a protected area in Chaudière-Appalaches, Quebec
