= Quebec Route 228 =

Highway in Quebec, Canada

Route 228

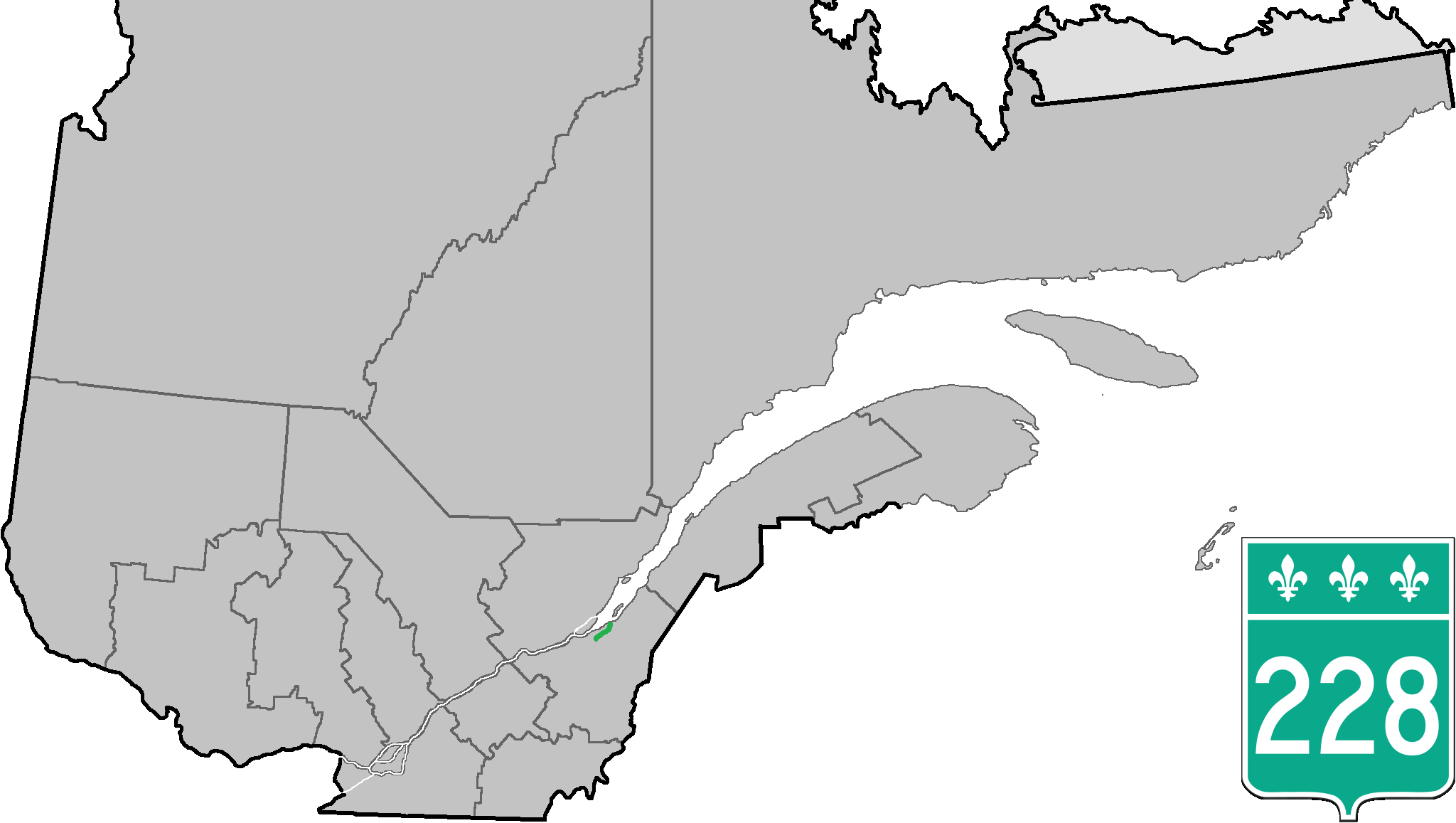

Route information
- Maintained by Transports Québec
- Length: 25.2 km (15.7 mi)

Major junctions
- West end: R-281 in Saint-Raphaël
- A-20 (TCH) in Montmagny
- East end: R-132 in Montmagny

Location
- Country: Canada
- Province: Quebec

Highway system
- Quebec provincial highways; Autoroutes; List; Former
| ← R-227 | → R-229 |

Route 228 is a two-lane east/west provincial highway in Quebec, Canada, which starts at the junction of Route 281 in Saint-Raphaël and ends in Montmagny at the junction of Route 132.

== Municipalities along Route 228 ==
- Saint-Raphaël
- Saint-Vallier
- Saint-Pierre-de-la-Rivière-du-Sud
- Saint-François-de-la-Rivière-du-Sud
- Montmagny

== See also ==
- List of Quebec provincial highways
