= Quebec Route 216 =

Highway in Quebec

Route 216

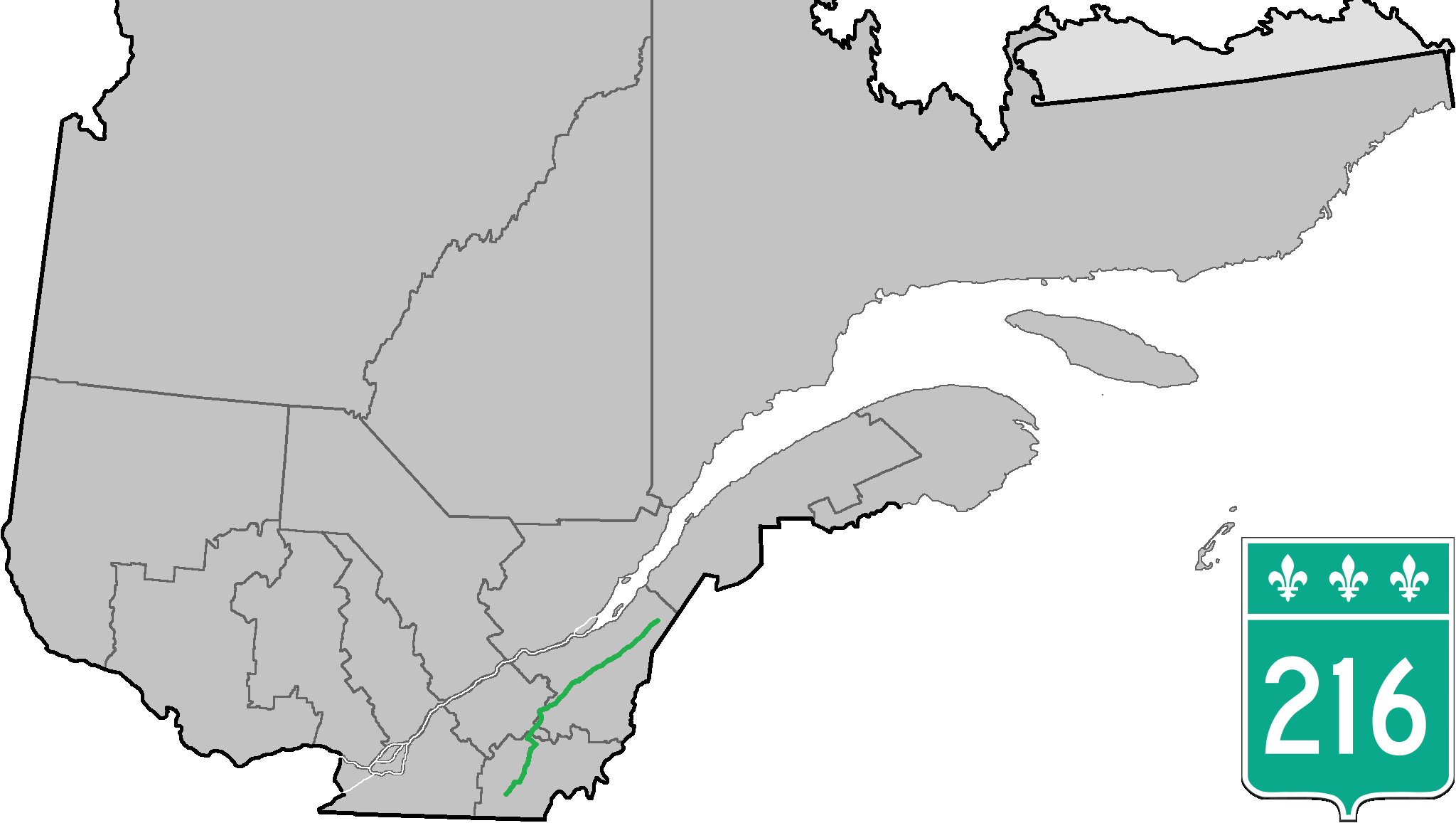

Route information
- Maintained by Transports Québec
- Length: 315.5 km (196.0 mi)

Major junctions
- West end: R-108 in Sainte-Catherine-de-Hatley
- A-610 / A-410 / R-112 / R-143 in Sherbrooke; R-255 in Saint-Camille & Wotton; R-257 in Saint-Adrien; R-161 in Ham-Nord; R-263 in Saint-Jacques-le-Majeur-de-Wolfestown; R-269 / R-271 in Saint-Jacques-de-Leeds; A-73 / R-173 in Sainte-Marie; R-275 in Sainte-Marguerite; R-281 in Saint-Philémon; R-283 in Saint-Paul-de-Montminy
- East end: R-204 in Sainte-Perpétue

Location
- Country: Canada
- Province: Quebec

Highway system
- Quebec provincial highways; Autoroutes; List; Former
← R-215	→ R-217

Route 216 is a two-lane east/west highway in Quebec, Canada, which starts in Sainte-Catherine-de-Hatley in the Estrie region at the junction of Route 108 and ends in Sainte-Perpétue in Chaudière-Appalaches at the junction of Route 204.

Route 216 follows mostly a northeast/southwest course, and it is not a busy highway as it mostly links small villages between themselves in the backroads of the Appalachians. The only two major towns along the way are Sherbrooke and Sainte-Marie. Between Ham-Nord (junction with Route 161) and Saint-Jacques-le-Majeur-de-Wolfestown (junction with Route 263), the road is unpaved.

== Municipalities along Route 216 ==
- Sainte-Catherine-de-Hatley
- Sherbrooke
- Stoke
- Saint-Camille
- Wotton
- Saint-Adrien
- Ham-Nord
- Saint-Jacques-le-Majeur-de-Wolfestown
- Saint-Julien
- Irlande
- Saint-Adrien-d'Irlande
- Saint-Jean-de-Brébeuf
- Kinnear's Mills
- Saint-Jacques-de-Leeds
- Saint-Sylvestre
- Saint-Elzéar
- Sainte-Marie
- Sainte-Marguerite
- Saint-Malachie
- Saint-Nazaire-de-Dorchester
- Notre-Dame-Auxiliatrice-du-Buckland
- Saint-Philémon
- Saint-Paul-de-Montminy
- Sainte-Apolline-de-Patton
- Saint-Marcel
- Sainte-Félicité
- Sainte-Perpétue
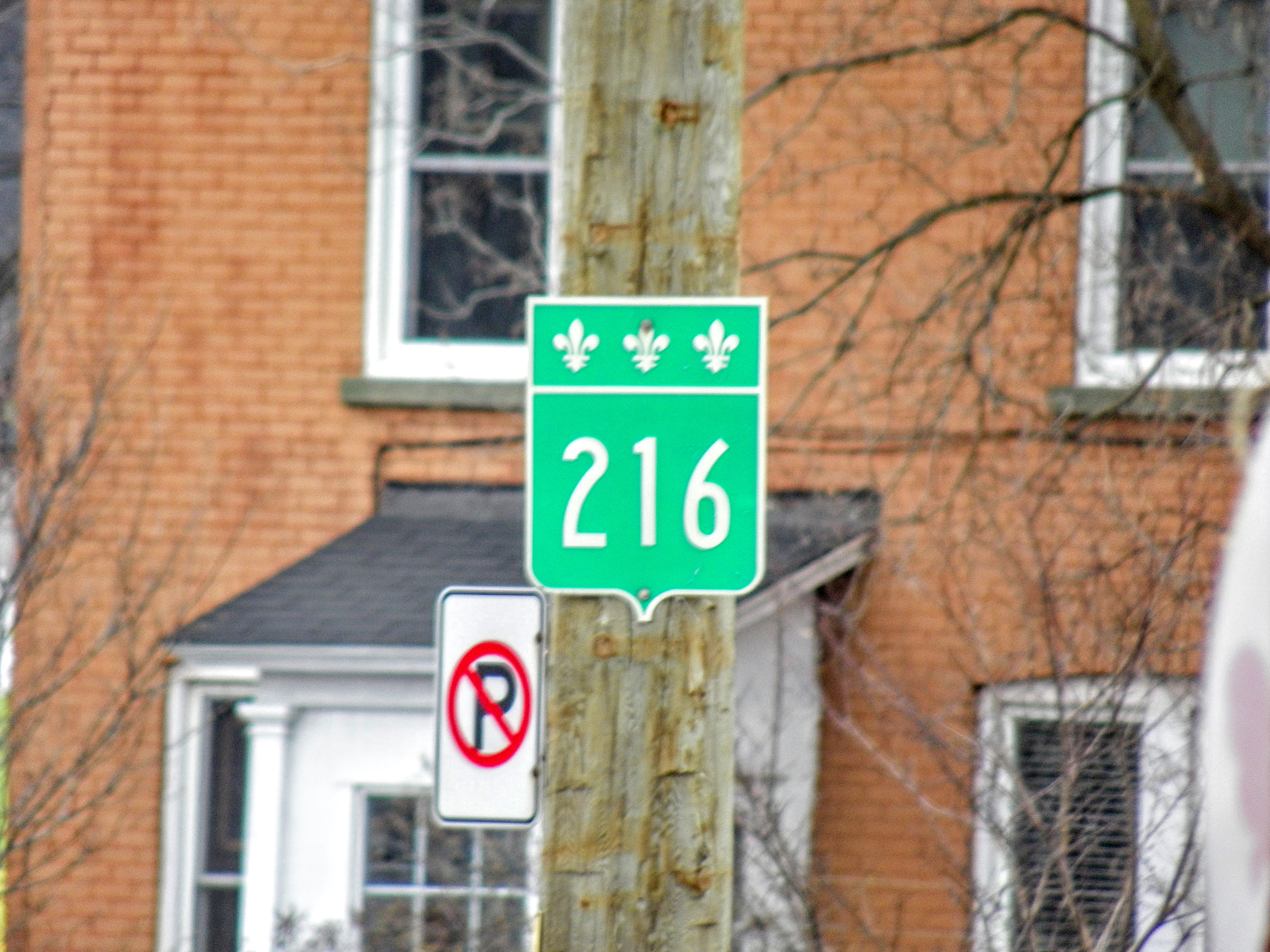
Route 216 in Mont-Bellevue borough, Sherbrooke.

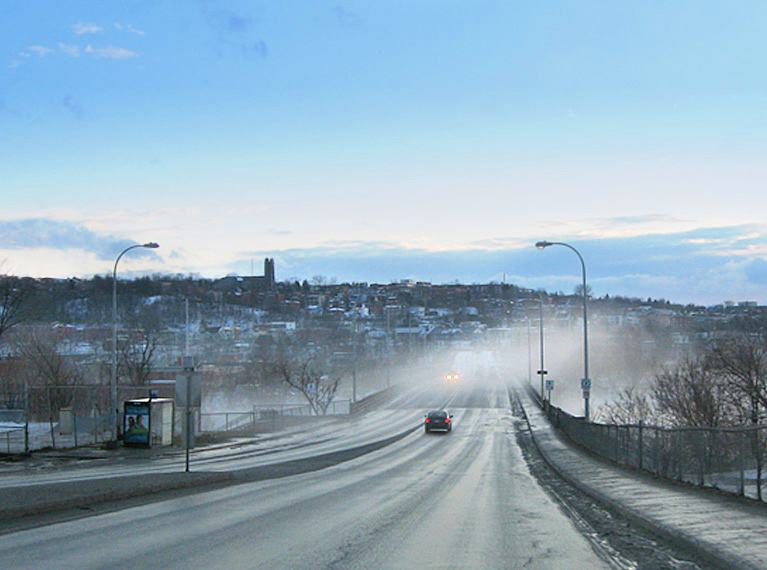
Route 216 through downtown Sherbrooke.

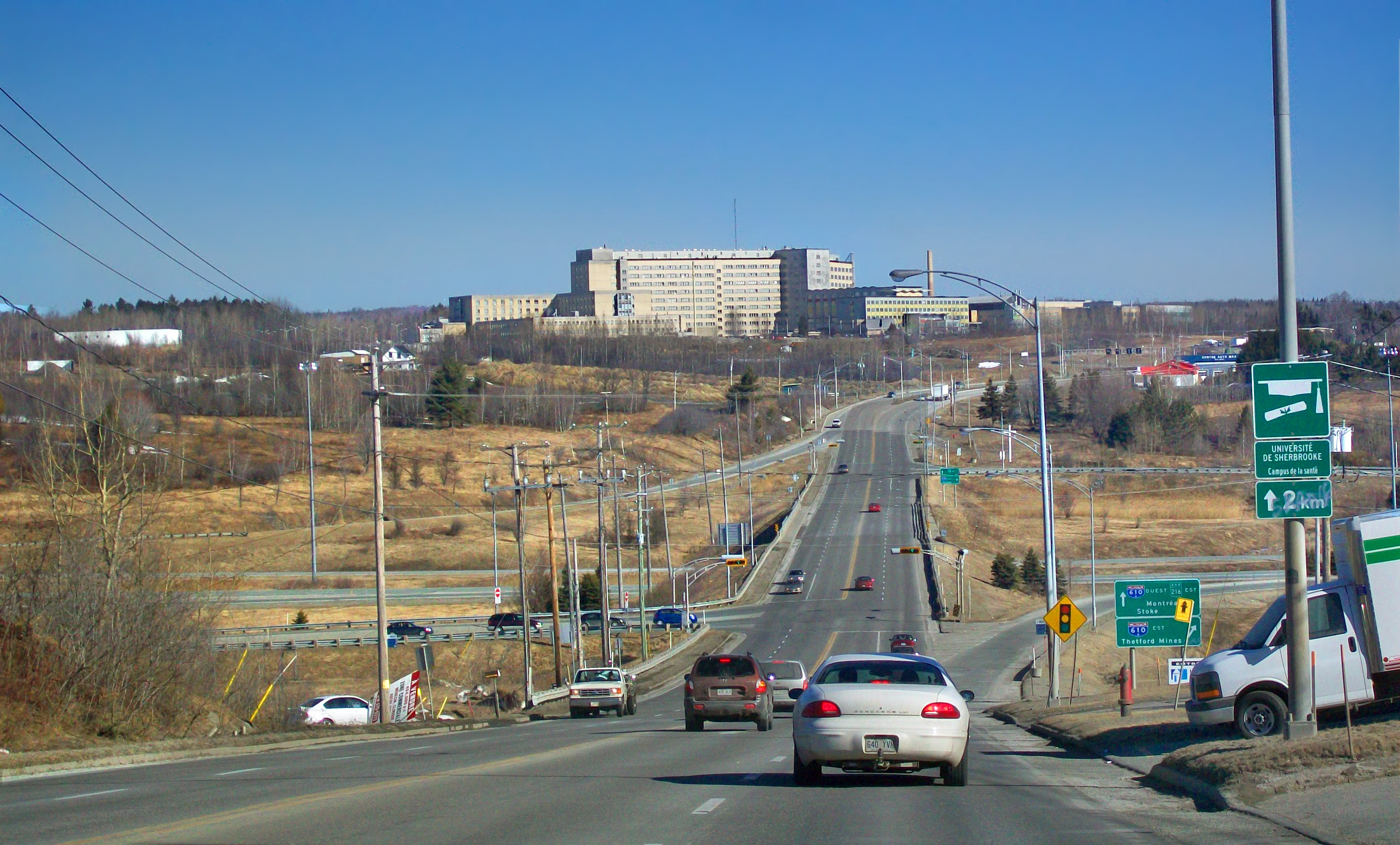
Route 216 is the main road to Centre hospitalier universitaire de Sherbrooke.

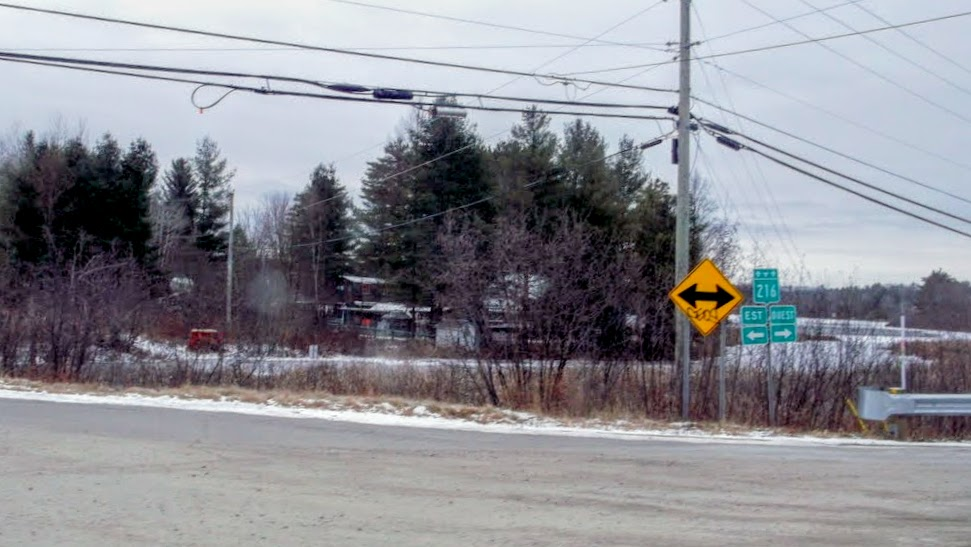
Route 216 in Stoke.

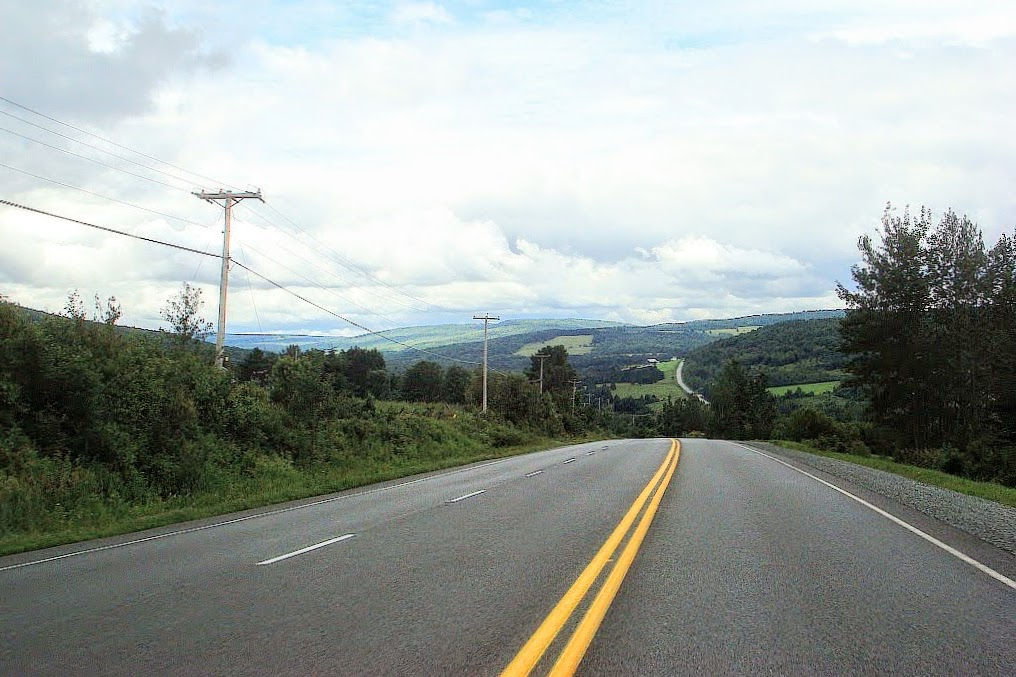
Route 216 in Saint-Jacques-de-Leeds.

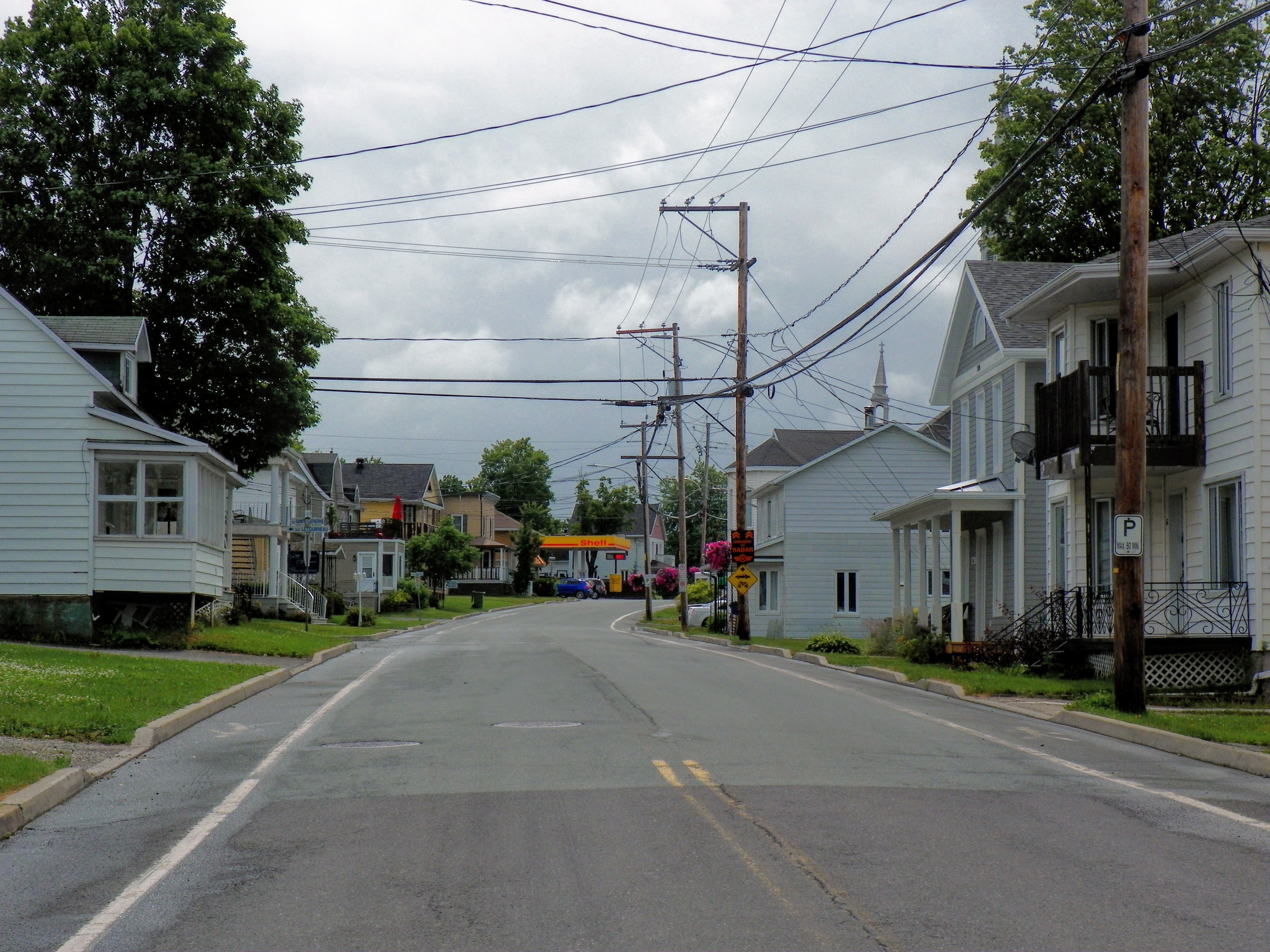
Principale street in à Saint-Sylvestre.

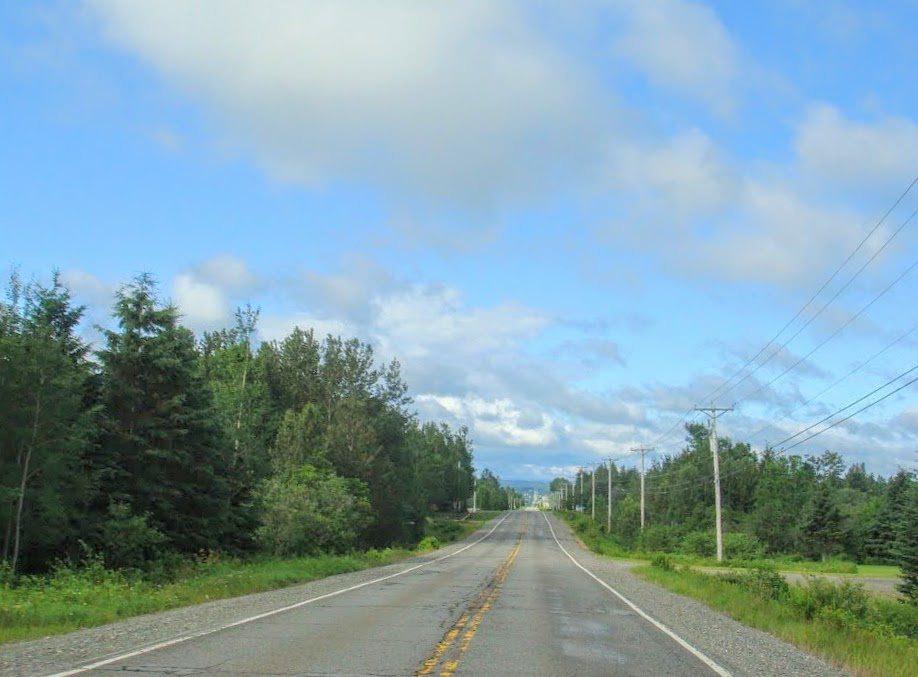
Route 216 in Sainte-Félicité.

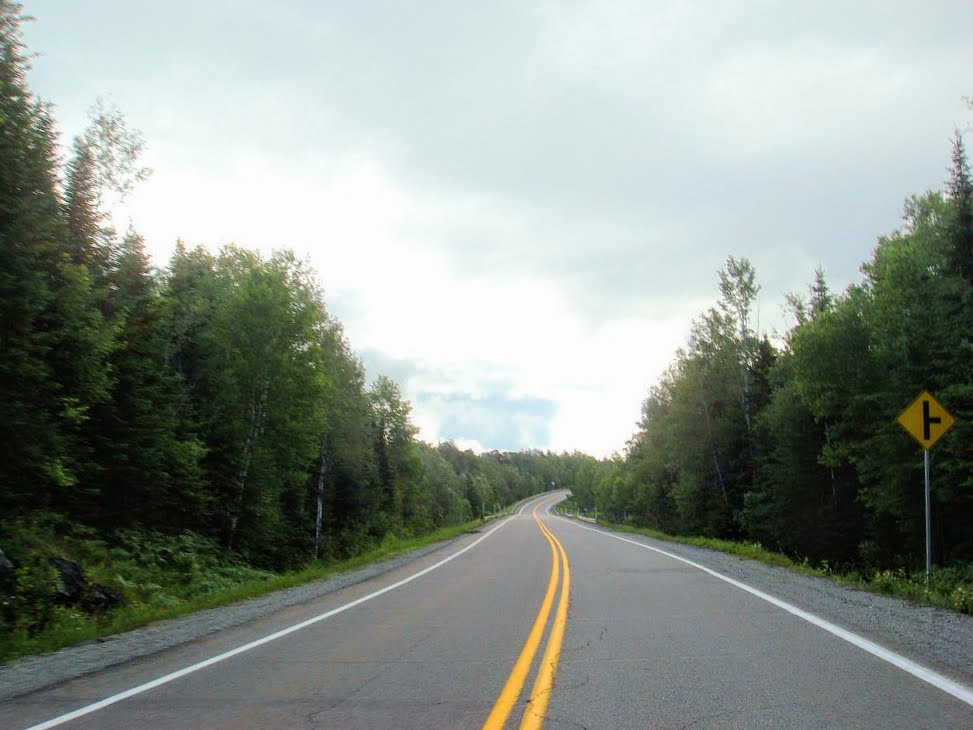
Route 216 in Saint-Marcel.

== See also ==
- List of Quebec provincial highways
