= Saint-François-de-la-Rivière-du-Sud =

- Municipality
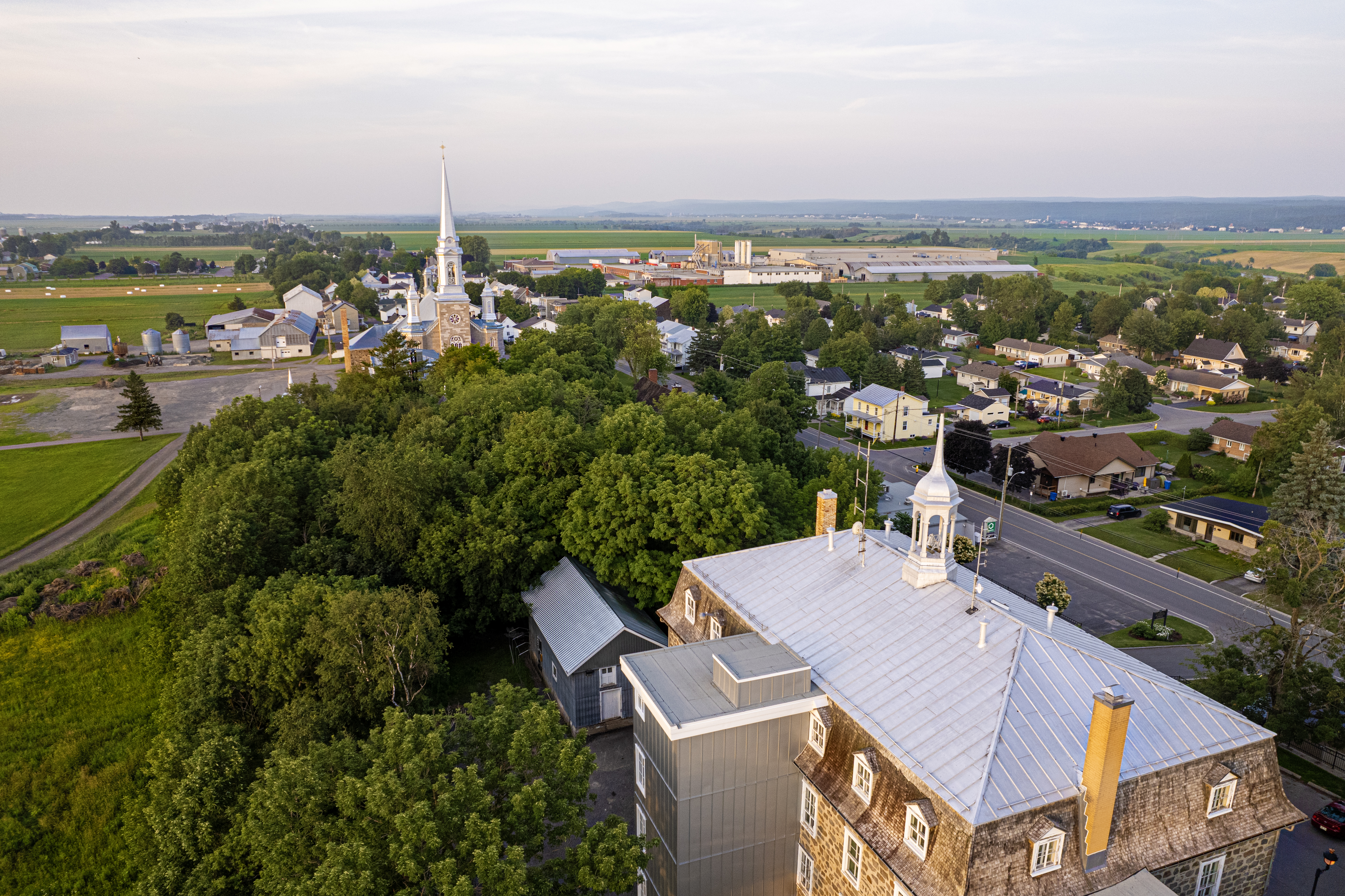

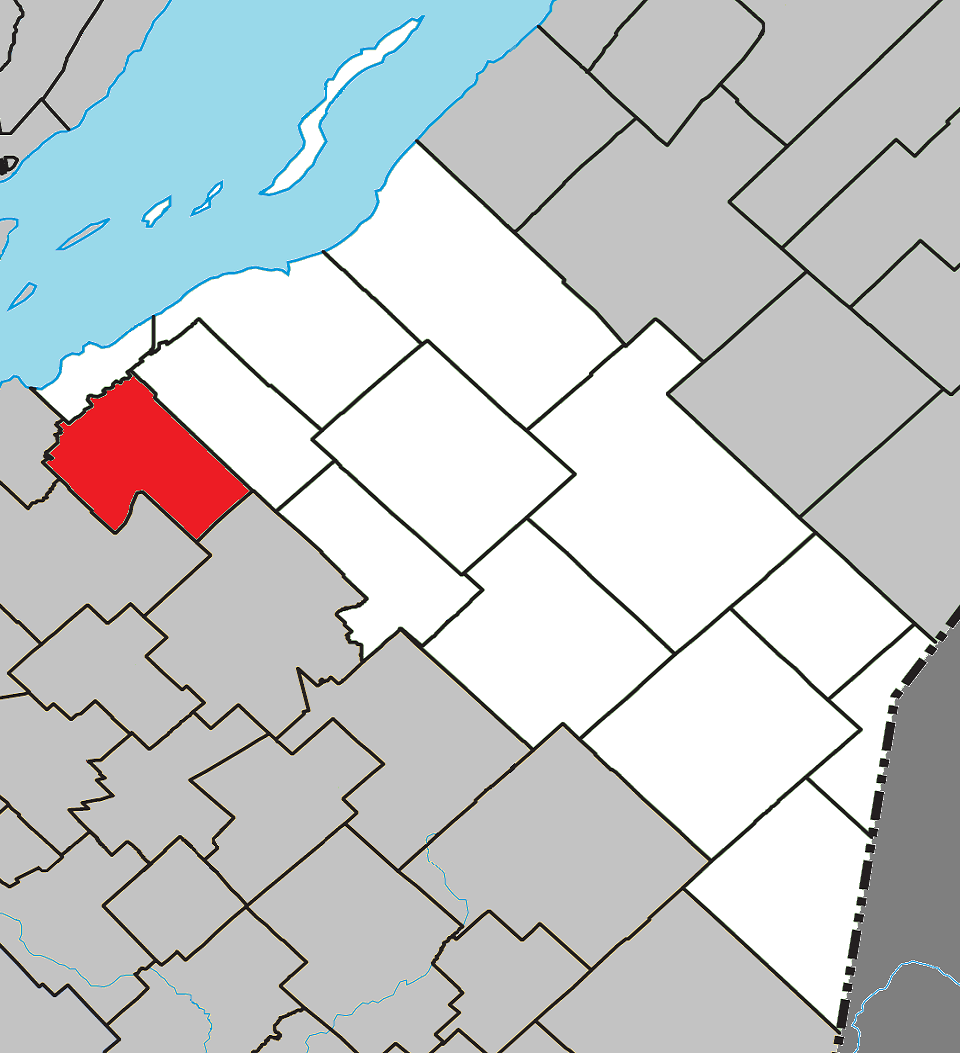
- Location within La Matapédia RCM

- Location in province of Quebec
- Coordinates: 46°53′N 70°43′W
- Country: Canada
- Province: Quebec
- Region: Chaudière-Appalaches
- RCM: Montmagny
- Constituted: July 1, 1855

Government
  - Mayor: Frédéric Jean
  - Fed. riding: Côte-du-Sud—Rivière-du-Loup—Kataskomiq—Témiscouata
  - Prov. riding: Côte-du-Sud

Area
  - Total: 96.98 km^{2} (37.44 sq mi)
  - Land: 96.35 km^{2} (37.20 sq mi)

Population (2021)
  - Total: 1,580
  - Density: 16.4/km^{2} (42/sq mi)
  - Pop (2016-21): ▼2.6%
  - Dwellings: 692
- Time zone: UTC−5 (EST)
  - Summer (DST): UTC−4 (EDT)
- Postal code(s): G0R 3A0
- Area codes: 418 and 581
- Highways A-20 (TCH): R-228
- Website: www.stfrancois.ca

Saint-François-de-la-Rivière-du-Sud (French pronunciation: [sɛ̃ fʁɑ̃swa də la ʁivjɛʁ dy syd]) is a municipality in Quebec, Canada.

== See also ==
- List of municipalities in Quebec
