= Notre-Dame-du-Rosaire =

- Municipality
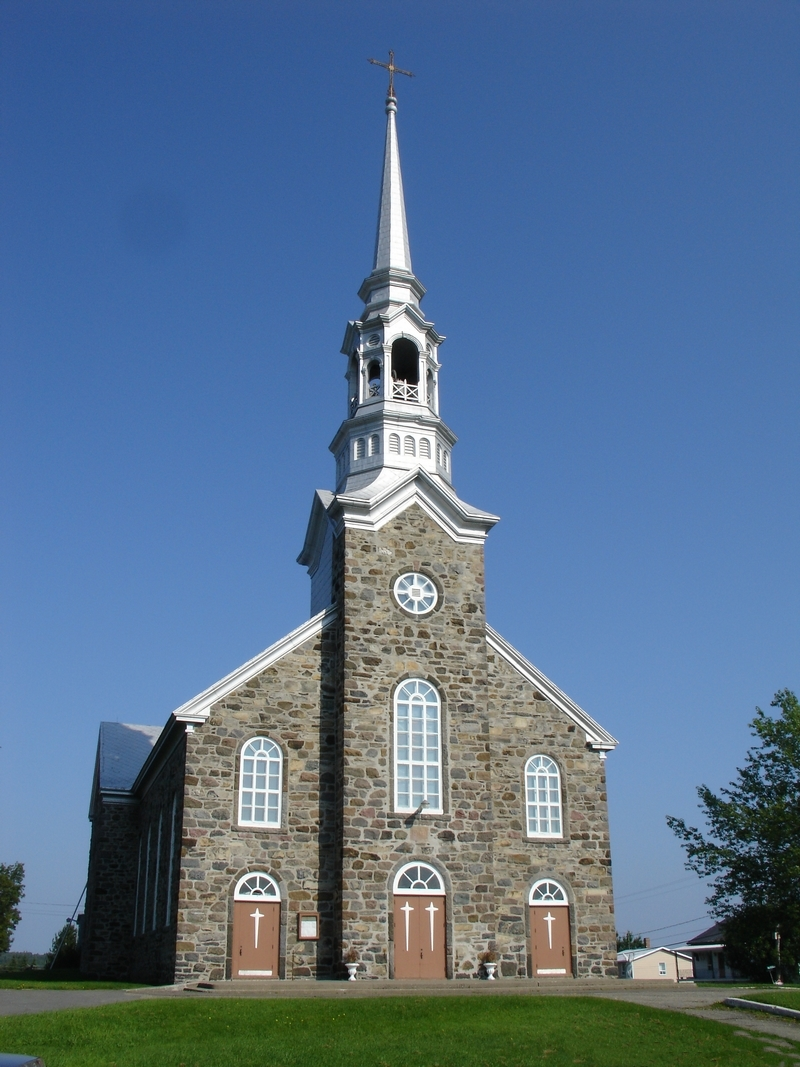

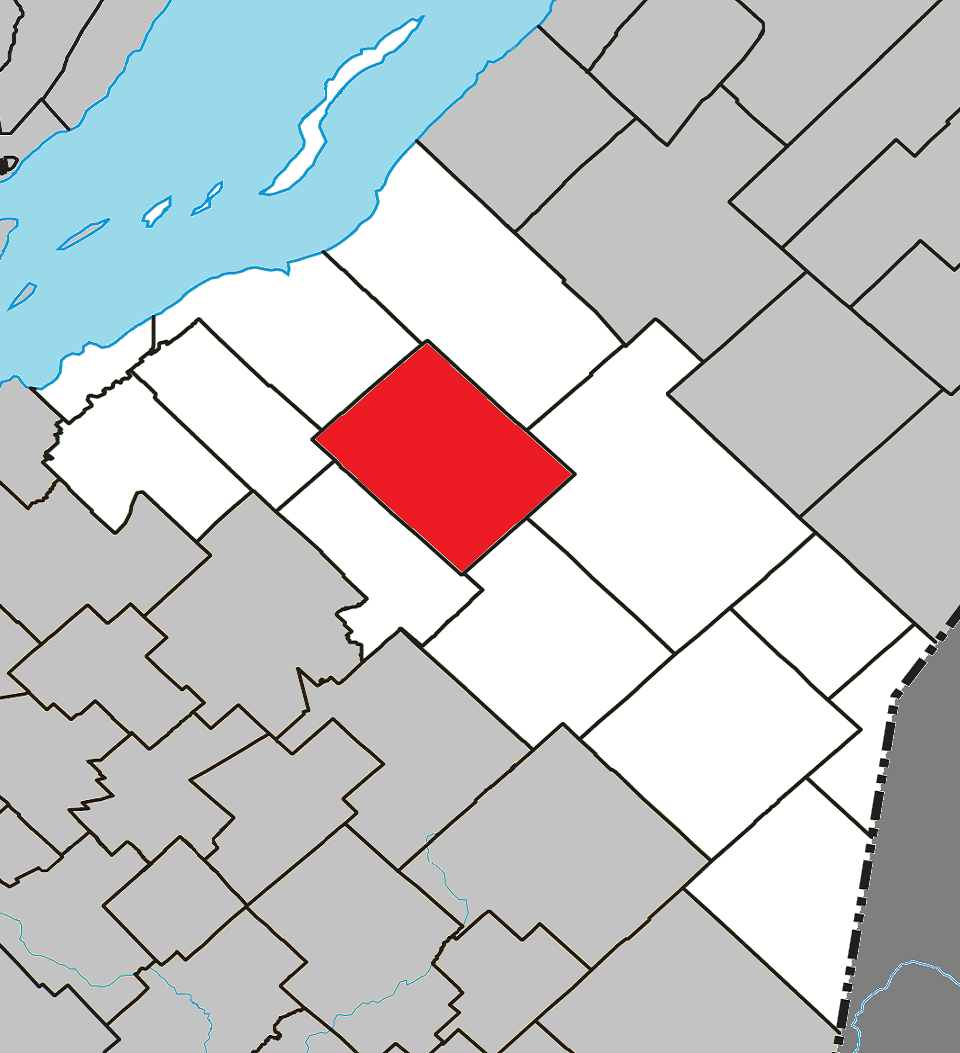
- Location within La Matapédia RCM

- Location in province of Quebec
- Coordinates: 46°50′N 70°24′W
- Country: Canada
- Province: Quebec
- Region: Chaudière-Appalaches
- RCM: Montmagny
- Constituted: December 18, 1894

Government
  - Mayor: Danye Anctil
  - Fed. riding: Côte-du-Sud—Rivière-du-Loup—Kataskomiq—Témiscouata
  - Prov. riding: Côte-du-Sud

Area
  - Total: 165.46 km^{2} (63.88 sq mi)
  - Land: 164.63 km^{2} (63.56 sq mi)

Population (2021)
  - Total: 371
  - Density: 2.3/km^{2} (6.0/sq mi)
  - Pop (2016-21): ▼5.4%
  - Dwellings: 242
- Time zone: UTC−5 (EST)
  - Summer (DST): UTC−4 (EDT)
- Postal code(s): G0R 2H0
- Area codes: 418 and 581
- Highways: R-283
- Website: www.notredamedurosaire.com

Notre-Dame-du-Rosaire (French pronunciation: [nɔtʁə dam dy ʁozɛʁ]) is a municipality of about 400 people in Montmagny Regional County Municipality within the Chaudière-Appalaches region of Quebec, Canada. It is located on the south shore of the St. Lawrence River, 20 kilometres (12 mi) south of Montmagny on Route 283.

== See also ==
- List of municipalities in Quebec
