= Montmagny, Quebec =

Montmagny
- City
- Montmagny in 2026

- Coat of arms

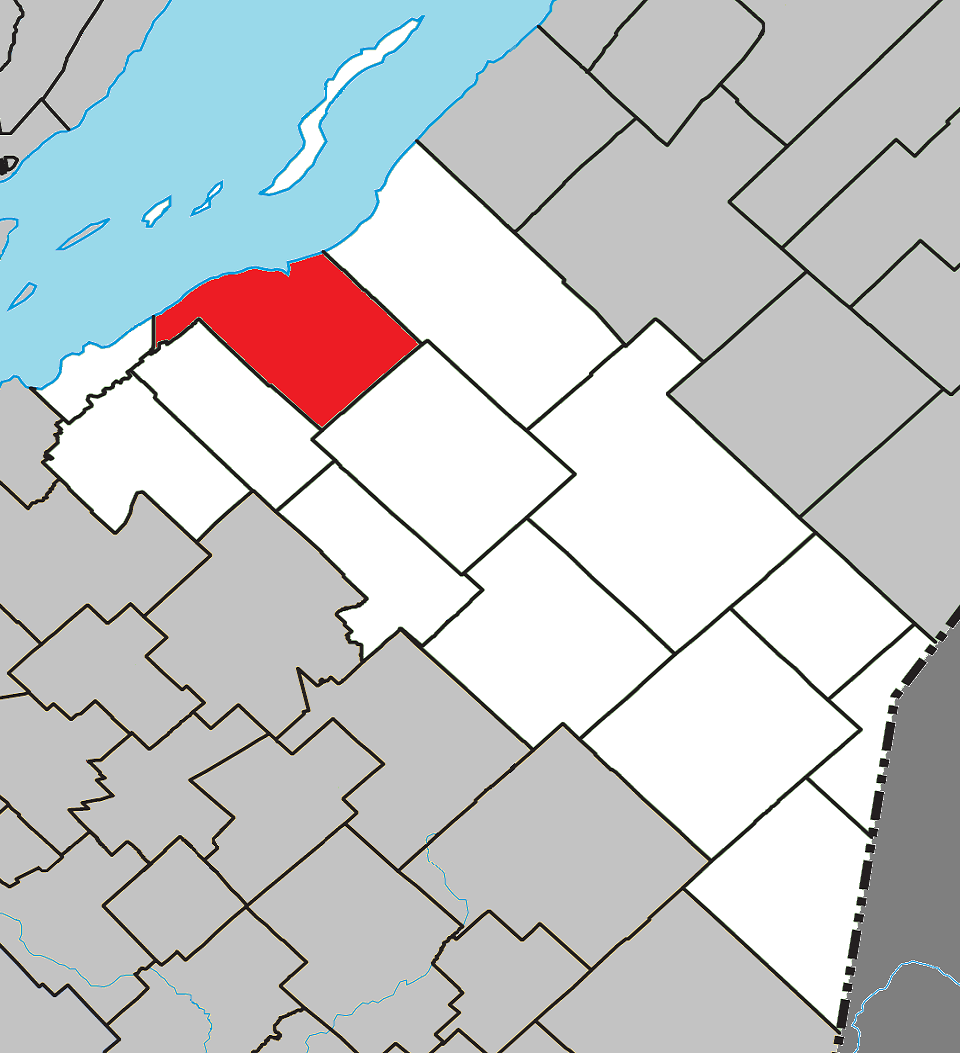
- Location within Montmagny RCM

- Location in province of Quebec
- Coordinates: 46°59′N 70°33′W
- Country: Canada
- Province: Quebec
- Region: Chaudière-Appalaches
- RCM: Montmagny
- Constituted: April 2, 1966

Government
  - Mayor: Gabrielle Brisebois
  - Fed. riding: Côte-du-Sud—Rivière-du-Loup—Kataskomiq—Témiscouata
  - Prov. riding: Côte-du-Sud

Area
  - Total: 145.51 km^{2} (56.18 sq mi)
  - Land: 124.44 km^{2} (48.05 sq mi)
  - Urban: 6.73 km^{2} (2.60 sq mi)

Population (2021)
  - Total: 10,999
  - Density: 88.4/km^{2} (229/sq mi)
  - Urban: 8,881
  - Urban density: 1,318.7/km^{2} (3,415/sq mi)
  - Pop (2016-21): ▼2.3%
  - Dwellings: 5,801
- Time zone: UTC−5 (EST)
  - Summer (DST): UTC−4 (EDT)
- Postal code(s): G5V
- Area codes: 418 and 581
- Highways A-20 (TCH): R-132; R-228; R-283
- Website: www.ville.montmagny.qc.ca

Montmagny (French pronunciation: [mɔ̃maɲi]) is a city in the Montmagny Regional County Municipality within the Chaudière-Appalaches region of Quebec, Canada. It is the county seat and had a population, as of the 2021 Canadian census, of 10,999.

The city is on the south shore of the St. Lawrence River, 80 kilometres (50 mi) east of Quebec City, and was founded more than 350 years ago. It is Canada's Snow Goose Capital, and festivals include the International Accordion Festival in September and the Festival of the Snow Geese in October.

The city was named after Charles de Montmagny, the first to have the title of governor of New France; Samuel de Champlain was commander in chief.

Montmagny was the county seat of the former Montmagny County.

== Geography ==
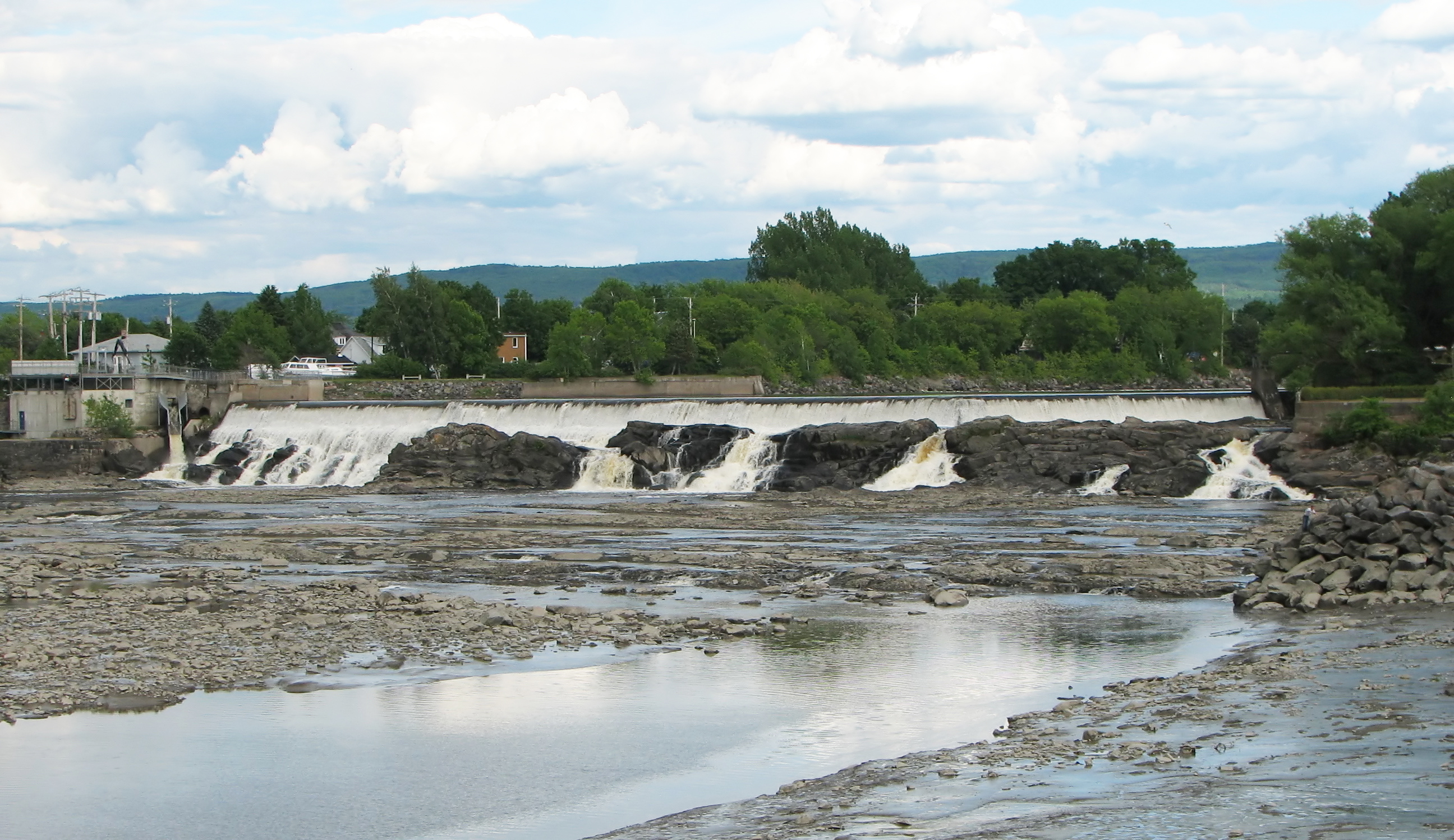
Chutes de la Rivière du Sud

Montmagny is northwest of the Notre Dame Mountains, more commonly but unofficially called the Canadian extension of the Green Mountains as they are called in New England. While Mont Notre Dame is the official name, the vast majority of people living in the area stretching from Quebec City to the Gaspé Peninsula refer to them as simply "the Appalachians" (French: les Appalaches), the origin of the official designation of the region comprising Quebec City's South Shore suburbia to the US border to the east and the northeast, which is known as Chaudière-Appalaches, after the mountains and the main river flowing down from them into the St. Lawrence River.

The city of Montmagny itself is divided by the South River (French: Rivière du Sud), where a smaller river, Bras-Saint-Nicolas, merges into it. The confluence of waters swells into a set of falls, leading to discharge into the Saint-Lawrence a short distance west of the city.

Montmagny is the seat of the judicial district of Montmagny.

Researchers have studied the intertidal marshes of the St. Lawrence estuary at Montmagny.

=== Climate ===
Climate data for Montmagny
Month	Jan	Feb	Mar	Apr	May	Jun	Jul	Aug	Sep	Oct	Nov	Dec	Year
Record high °C (°F)	14.0 (57.2)	13.0 (55.4)	19.0 (66.2)	30.0 (86.0)	32.2 (90.0)	35.0 (95.0)	36.0 (96.8)	33.3 (91.9)	30.5 (86.9)	24.5 (76.1)	22.0 (71.6)	21.0 (69.8)	36.0 (96.8)
Mean daily maximum °C (°F)	−7.2 (19.0)	−5.2 (22.6)	0.4 (32.7)	7.5 (45.5)	16.2 (61.2)	21.9 (71.4)	24.8 (76.6)	23.4 (74.1)	17.7 (63.9)	10.7 (51.3)	3.3 (37.9)	−3.8 (25.2)	9.1 (48.4)
Daily mean °C (°F)	−11.9 (10.6)	−10 (14)	−4.3 (24.3)	3.0 (37.4)	10.7 (51.3)	16.3 (61.3)	19.2 (66.6)	18.0 (64.4)	12.9 (55.2)	6.5 (43.7)	−0.2 (31.6)	−8 (18)	4.4 (39.9)
Mean daily minimum °C (°F)	−16.5 (2.3)	−14.8 (5.4)	−8.9 (16.0)	−1.5 (29.3)	5.1 (41.2)	10.7 (51.3)	13.6 (56.5)	12.6 (54.7)	8.0 (46.4)	2.2 (36.0)	−3.7 (25.3)	−12.1 (10.2)	−0.5 (31.1)
Record low °C (°F)	−37.0 (−34.6)	−31.7 (−25.1)	−32.0 (−25.6)	−19.0 (−2.2)	−6.1 (21.0)	−2.5 (27.5)	2.0 (35.6)	1.0 (33.8)	−4.5 (23.9)	−7.8 (18.0)	−20.0 (−4.0)	−32.0 (−25.6)	−37.0 (−34.6)
Average precipitation mm (inches)	85.1 (3.35)	61.7 (2.43)	73.3 (2.89)	81.1 (3.19)	101.5 (4.00)	105.2 (4.14)	129.2 (5.09)	119.2 (4.69)	115.6 (4.55)	103.6 (4.08)	90.4 (3.56)	87.6 (3.45)	1,153.5 (45.41)
Source: Environment Canada

== History ==
In 1671, the first settlers arrived in the area. That same year, the Mission of Saint-Thomas-de-la-Pointe-à-Lacaille was founded.

In 1845, the Village Municipality of Montmagny was established and became a town (ville) in 1883.

In 1966, the municipality of Saint-Thomas-de-la-Pointe-à-la-Caille (established in 1845) was amalgamated with Montmagny.

== Demographics ==
In the 2021 Census of Population conducted by Statistics Canada, Montmagny had a population of 10,999 living in 5,464 of its 5,801 total private dwellings, a change of −2.3% from its 2016 population of 11,255. With a land area of 124.44 km^{2} (48.05 sq mi), it had a population density of 88.4/km^{2} (228.9/sq mi) in 2021.

Historical census populations – Montmagny, Quebec

Year	Pop.	±%
1871	1,512	—
1881	1,738	+14.9%
1891	1,697	−2.4%
1901	1,919	+13.1%
1911	2,617	+36.4%
1921	4,145	+58.4%
1931	3,927	−5.3%
1941	4,585	+16.8%

Year	Pop.	±%
1951	5,844	+27.5%
1956	6,405	+9.6%
1961	6,850	+6.9%
1966	12,241	+78.7%
1971	12,432	+1.6%
1976	12,326	−0.9%
1981	12,405	+0.6%
1986	11,958	−3.6%

Year	Pop.	±%
1991	11,861	−0.8%
1996	11,885	+0.2%
2001	11,654	−1.9%
2006	11,353	−2.6%
2011	11,491	+1.2%
2016	11,255	−2.1%
2021	10,999	−2.3%

Population counts are not adjusted for boundary changes or merger in 1966.
Source: Statistics Canada

== Economy ==
The industrial sector is the backbone of the economy. However, the city lost many jobs when Whirlpool closed its activities on May 13, 2004, incurring the loss of 600 jobs. The city has rebounded from that period. Textile industry has also made employment for decades. A post-secondary institution, The Centre d'études collégiales de Montmagny, a hospital, named Hôtel-Dieu de Montmagny, and a provincial jail are part of the economy.

== Government ==
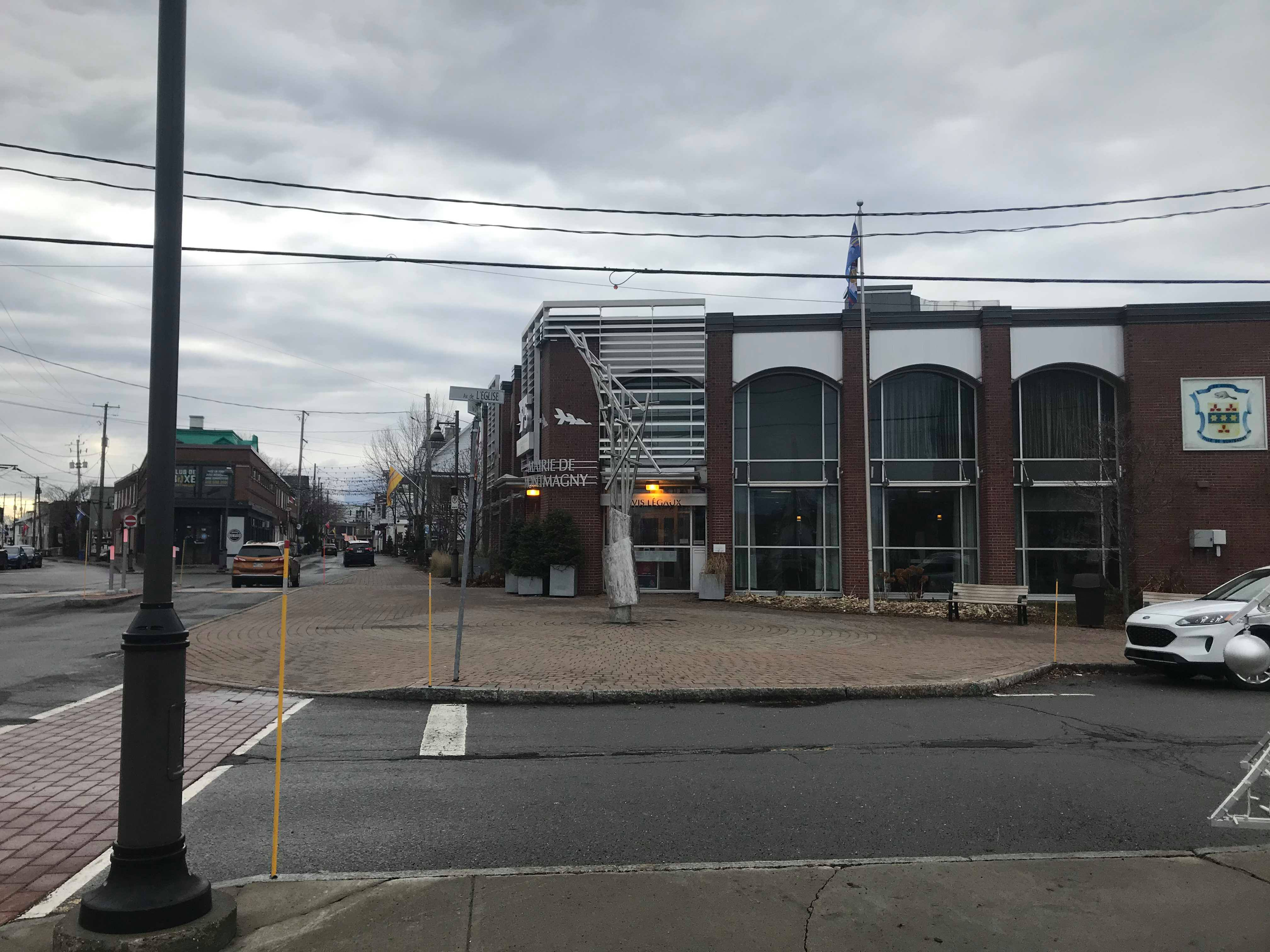
City hall of Montmagny

List of former mayors:

- Jean-Claude Croteau (...–2005)
- Jean-Guy Desrosiers (2005–2017)
- Rémy Langevin (2017–2021)
- Marc Laurin (2021–2025)
- Gabrielle Brisebois (2025-present)

== Notable people ==
- Alex Barré-Boulet, professional ice hockey player for the Colorado Avalanche
- Amable Bélanger, iron founder
- Sammy Blais, professional ice hockey left winger
- Gérard Bolduc, founder of the Quebec International Pee-Wee Hockey Tournament
- Alain Côté, ice and roller hockey player
- Sylvie Garant, model, Playboy Playmate of the Month for November 1979
- Étienne-Paschal Taché, twice Premier of the Province of Canada, President of the Quebec Conference, 1864, considered a Father of Confederation
- Emma Gaudreau Casgrain, first woman to be licensed as a dentist in Canada

== See also ==
- Zec de l'Oie-Blanche-de-Montmagny (ZEC)
- List of cities in Quebec
