= Sainte-Euphémie-sur-Rivière-du-Sud =

- Municipality
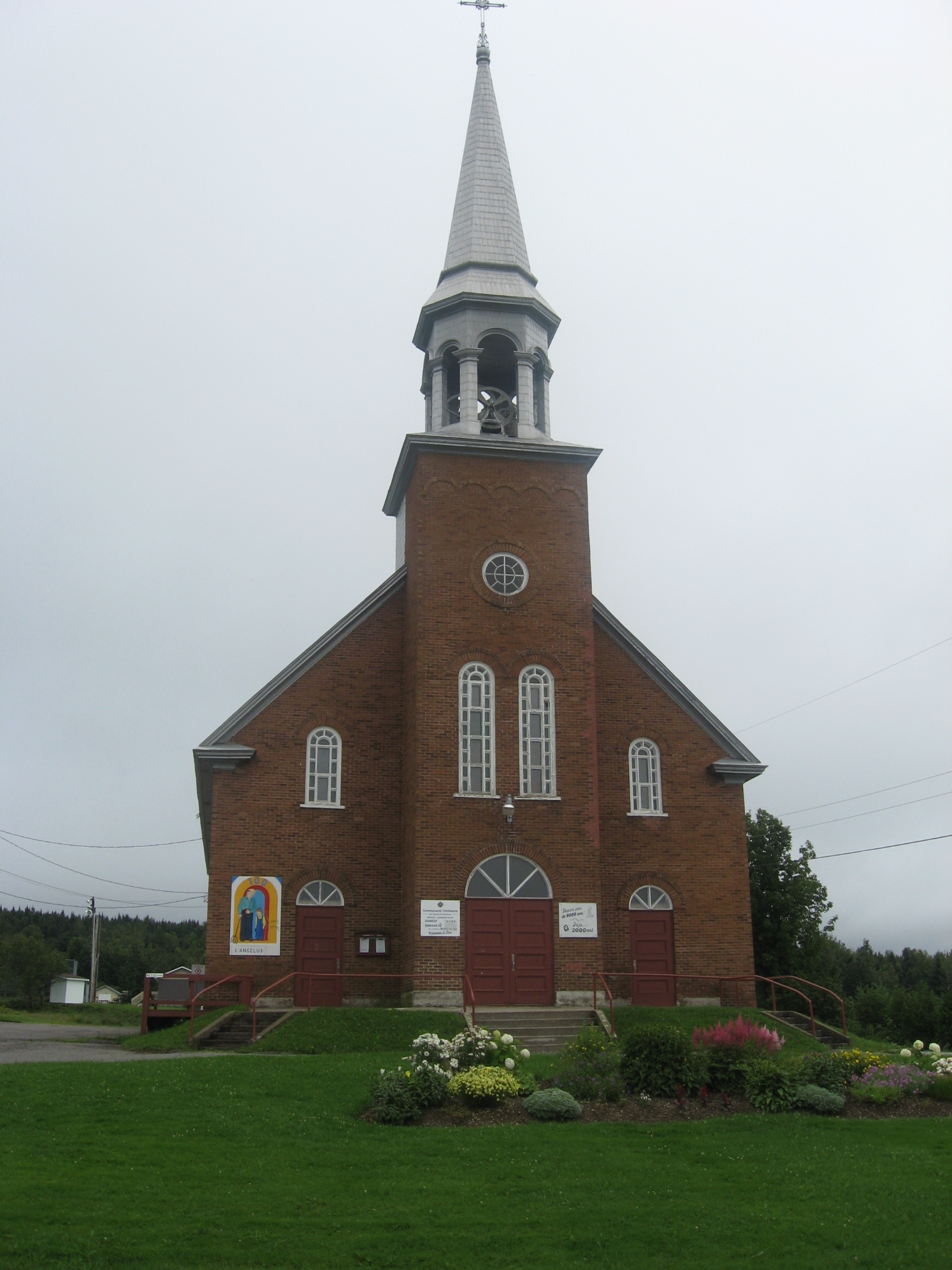

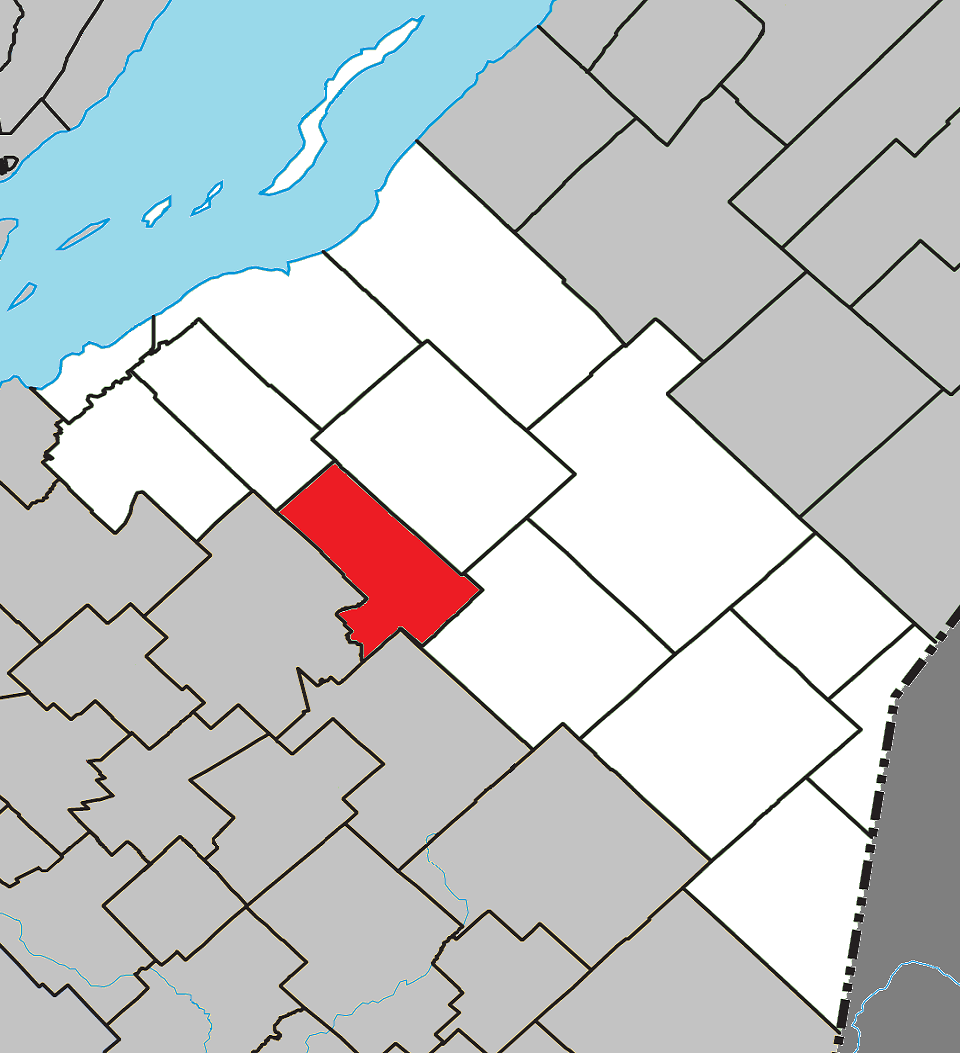
- Location within La Matapédia RCM

- Location in province of Quebec
- Coordinates: 46°46′N 70°26′W
- Country: Canada
- Province: Quebec
- Region: Chaudière-Appalaches
- RCM: Montmagny
- Constituted: July 20, 1907

Government
  - Mayor: Daniel Mercier
  - Federal riding: Côte-du-Sud—Rivière-du-Loup—Kataskomiq—Témiscouata
  - Prov. riding: Côte-du-Sud

Area
  - Total: 92.73 km^{2} (35.80 sq mi)
  - Land: 92.44 km^{2} (35.69 sq mi)

Population (2021)
  - Total: 338
  - Density: 3.7/km^{2} (9.6/sq mi)
  - Pop 2016-2021: ▲5.6%
  - Dwellings: 209
- Time zone: UTC−5 (EST)
  - Summer (DST): UTC−4 (EDT)
- Postal code(s): G0R 2Z0
- Area codes: 418 and 581
- Highways: No major routes
- Website: municipalites-du-quebec.com/ste-euphemie/

Sainte-Euphémie-sur-Rivière-du-Sud (French pronunciation: [sɛ̃t øfemi syʁ ʁivjɛʁ dy syd]) is a municipality of 350 people in the Montmagny Regional County Municipality within the Chaudière-Appalaches region of Quebec, Canada.

== See also ==
- List of municipalities in Quebec
