= Saint-Raphaël, Quebec =

Saint-Raphaël
- Municipality
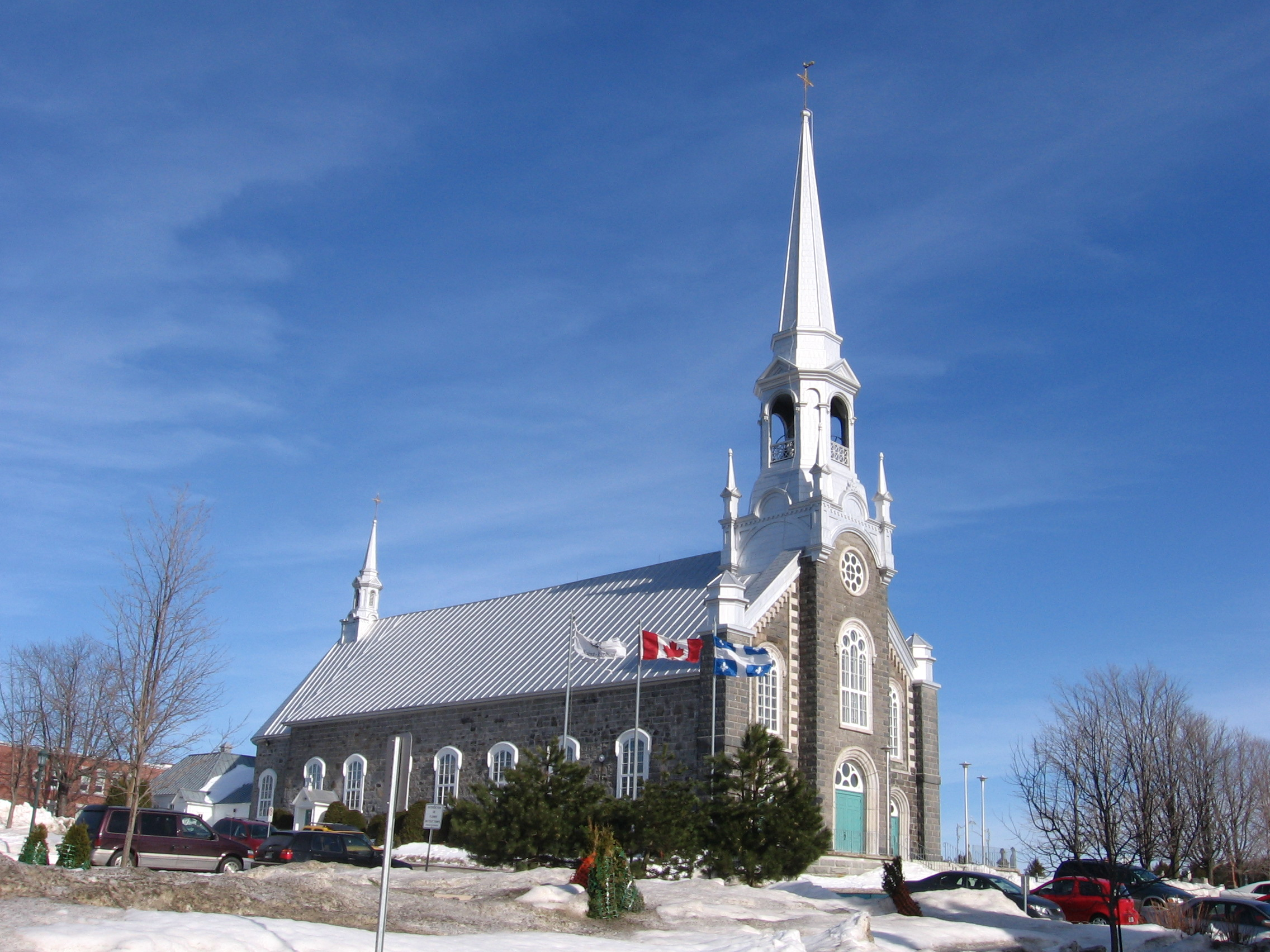
- Motto: "Anima mes in manibus" (Latin for, "My soul is in my hands")
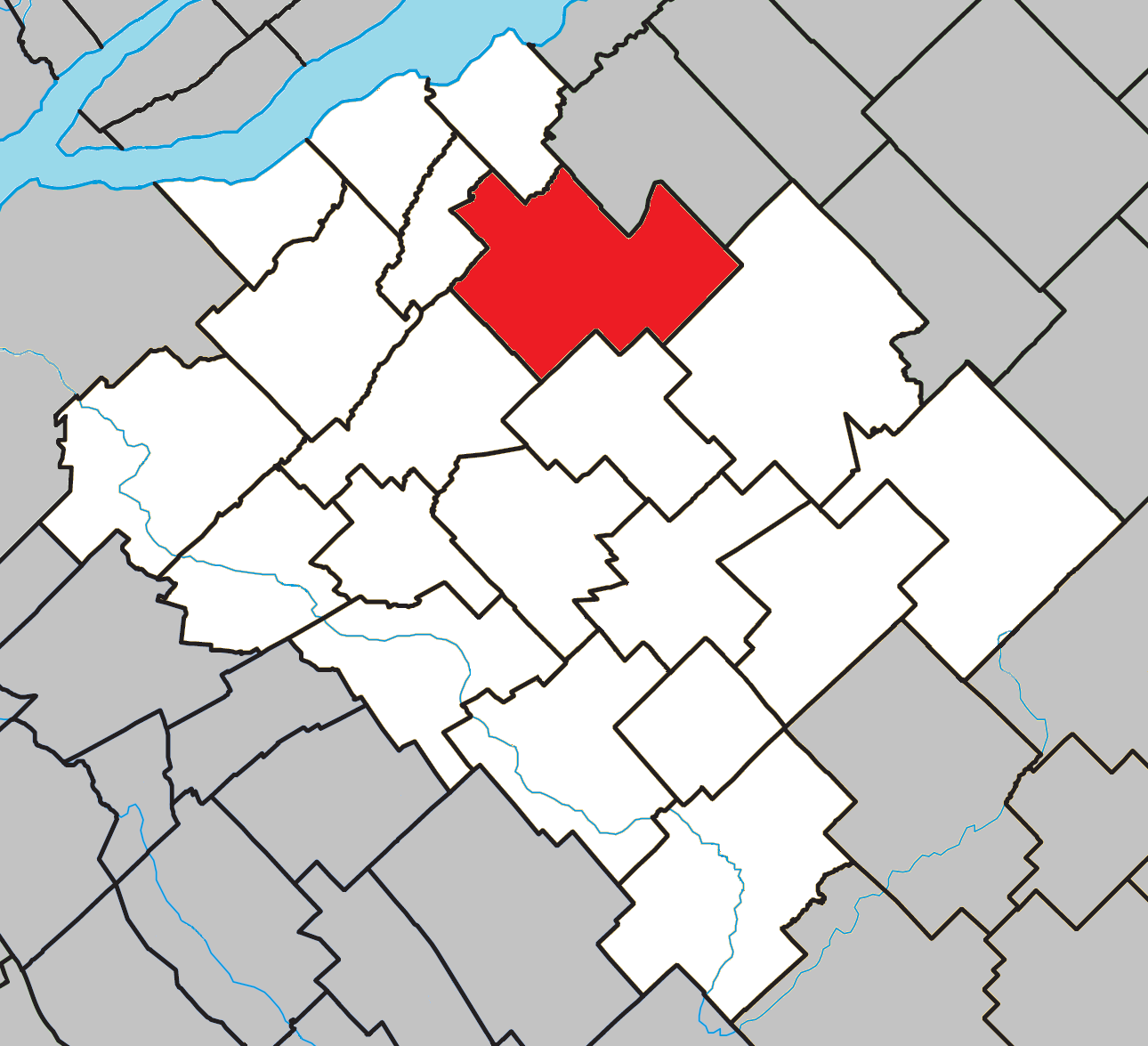
- Location within Bellechasse RCM.

- Location in province of Quebec.
- Coordinates: 46°48′N 70°45′W
- Country: Canada
- Province: Quebec
- Region: Chaudière-Appalaches
- RCM: Bellechasse
- Constituted: December 8, 1993

Government
  - Mayor: Richard Thibault
  - Federal riding: Bellechasse—Les Etchemins—Lévis
  - Prov. riding: Bellechasse

Area
  - Total: 123.30 km^{2} (47.61 sq mi)
  - Land: 121.69 km^{2} (46.98 sq mi)

Population (2021)
  - Total: 2,458
  - Density: 20.2/km^{2} (52/sq mi)
  - Pop 2016-2021: ▲2.8%
  - Dwellings: 1,237
- Time zone: UTC−5 (EST)
  - Summer (DST): UTC−4 (EDT)
- Postal code(s): G0R 4C0
- Area codes: 418 and 581
- Highways: R-281
- Website: www.municipalite. saint-raphael.qc.ca

Saint-Raphaël (French pronunciation: [sɛ̃ ʁafaɛl]) is a municipality of about 2,500 people in Bellechasse Regional County Municipality in the Chaudière-Appalaches administrative region of Quebec. It has several small buildings and a very small supermarket.

== Demographics ==
=== Population ===
Population trend:

Census	Population	Change (%)
2021	2,458	▲2.8%
2016	2,390	▼3.0%
2011	2,463	▲7.0%
2006	2,301	▲3.1%
2001	2,231	▲2.0%
1996	2,187	N/A
