= Saint-Paul-de-Montminy =

- Municipality
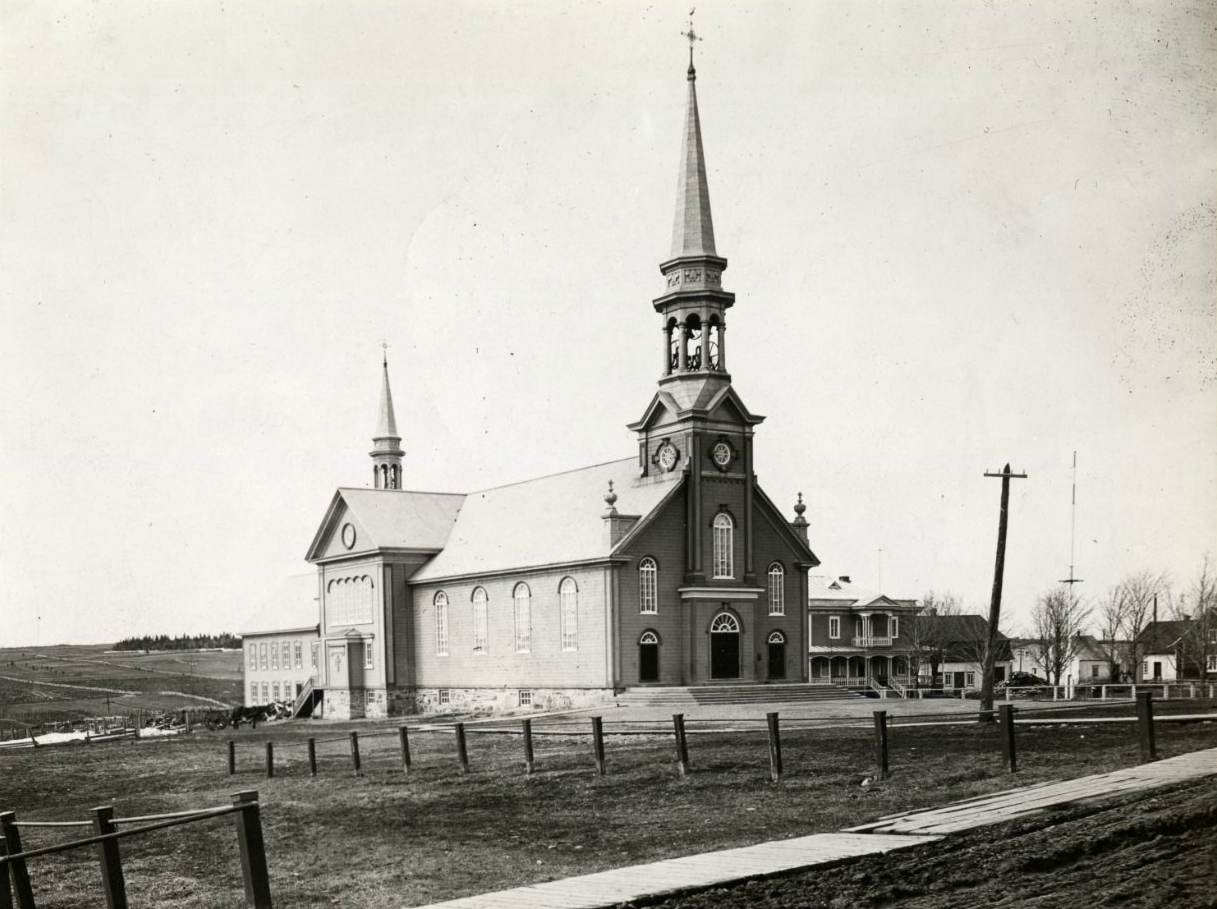

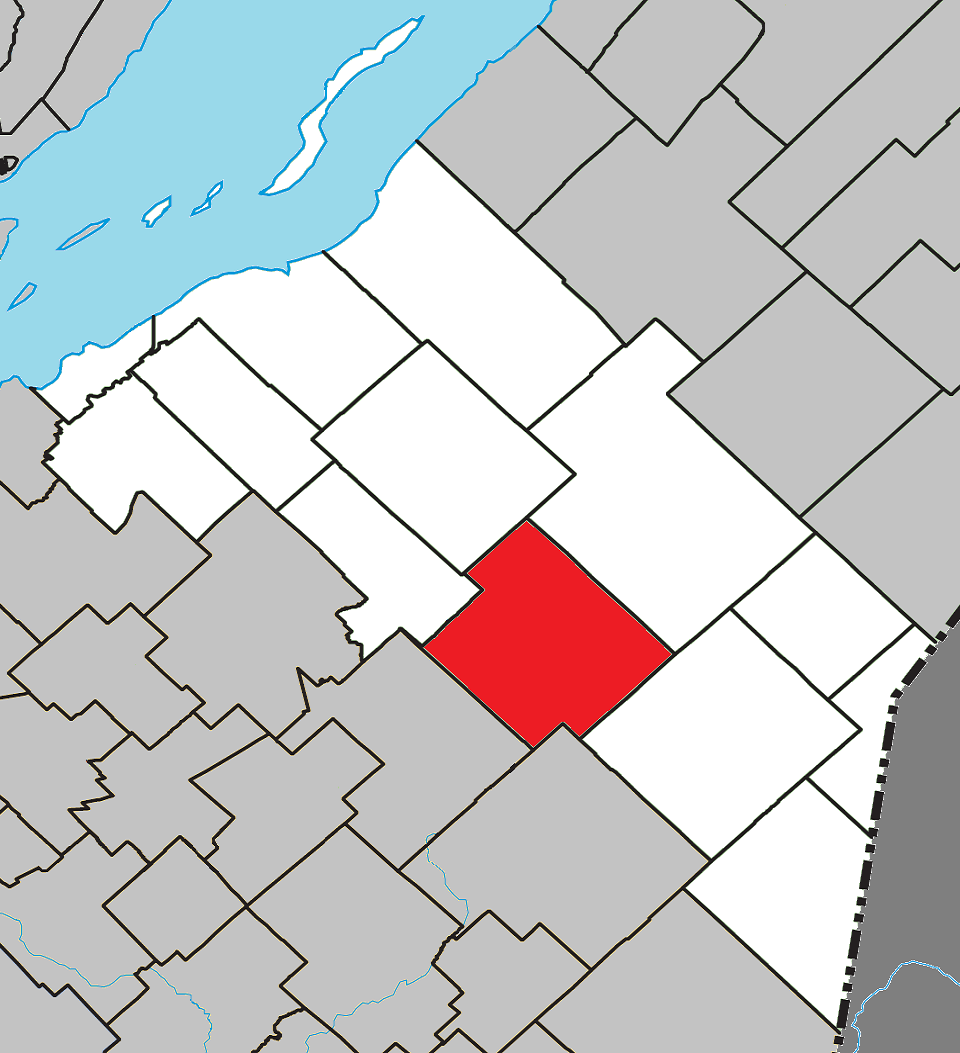
- Location within Montmagny RCM

- Location in province of Quebec
- Coordinates: 46°44′N 70°22′W
- Country: Canada
- Province: Quebec
- Region: Chaudière-Appalaches
- RCM: Montmagny
- Constituted: January 1, 1862

Government
  - Mayor: Alain Talbot
  - Fed. riding: Côte-du-Sud—Rivière-du-Loup—Kataskomiq—Témiscouata
  - Prov. riding: Côte-du-Sud

Area
  - Total: 164.42 km^{2} (63.48 sq mi)
  - Land: 162.77 km^{2} (62.85 sq mi)

Population (2021)
  - Total: 849
  - Density: 5.2/km^{2} (13/sq mi)
  - Pop (2016-21): ▲8.2%
  - Dwellings: 520
- Time zone: UTC−5 (EST)
  - Summer (DST): UTC−4 (EDT)
- Postal code(s): G0R 3Y0
- Area codes: 418 and 581
- Highways: R-216 R-283
- Website: www.stpauldemontminy.com

Saint-Paul-de-Montminy (French pronunciation: [sɛ̃ pɔl də mɔ̃mini]) is a village of 849 people located in the Montmagny Regional County Municipality, Quebec. Geographically it is located in the Notre Dame Mountains, part of the Appalachian Mountains located in Canada. It was founded in 1862.

== See also ==
- List of municipalities in Quebec
