= Quebec Route 281 =

Highway in Quebec, Canada

Route 281

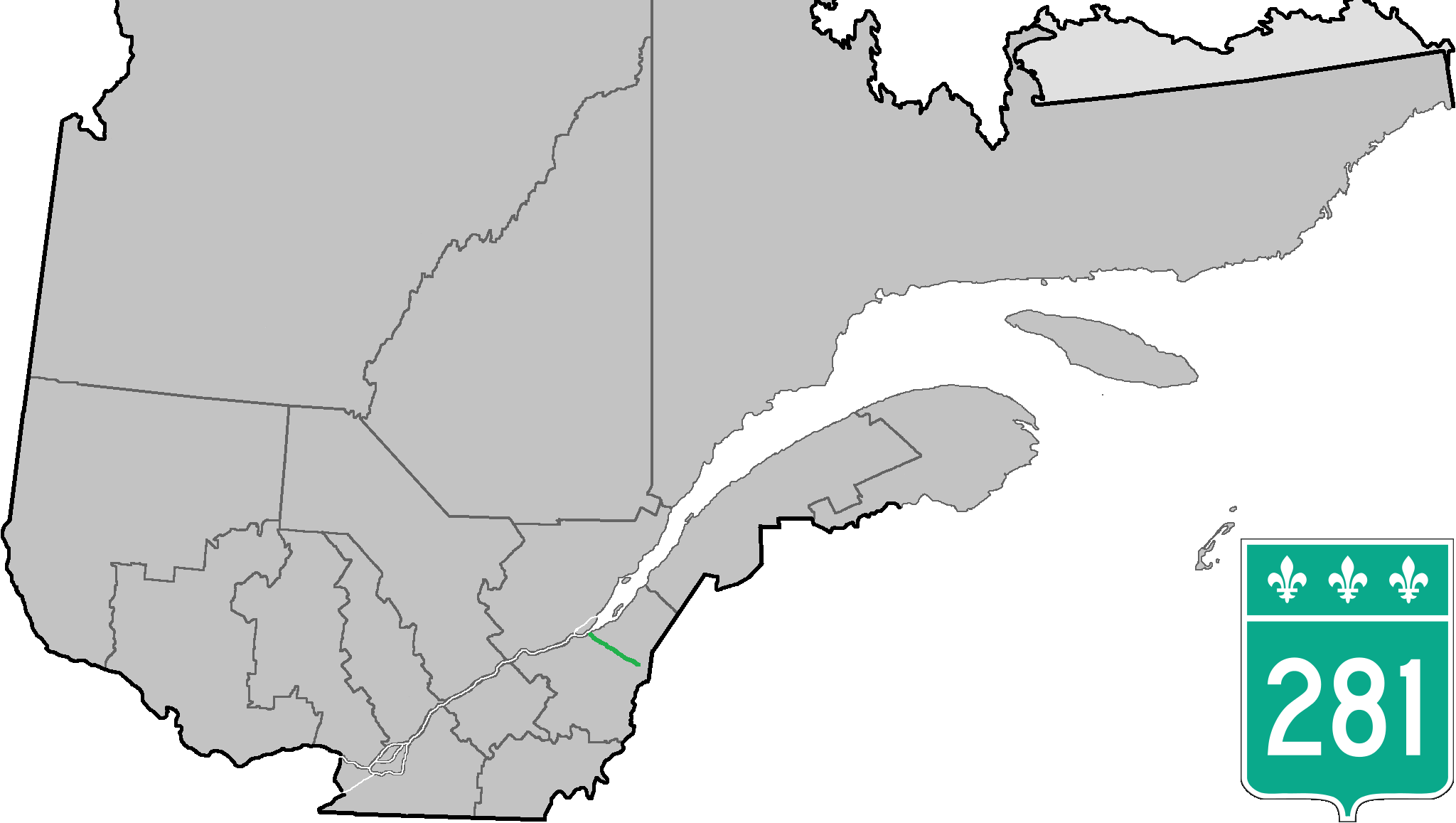

Route information
- Length: 75 km (47 mi)

Major junctions
- North end: R-132 near Saint-Michel-de-Bellechasse
- A-20 (TCH) near La Durantaye
- South end: R-204 in Saint-Camille-de-Lellis

Location
- Country: Canada
- Province: Quebec
- Major cities: Saint-Michel-de-Bellechasse Saint-Camille-de-Lellis Saint-Magloire Saint-Philémon Armagh Saint-Raphaël La Durantaye

Highway system
- Quebec provincial highways; Autoroutes; List; Former
| ← R-279 | → R-283 |

Route 281 is a 75 km two-lane north/south highway in the Chaudière-Appalaches region in the province of Quebec, Canada. Its northern terminus is in St-Michel at the junction of Route 132 and its southern terminus is close to Saint-Camille-de-Lellis at the junction of Route 204.

== Towns along Route 281 ==
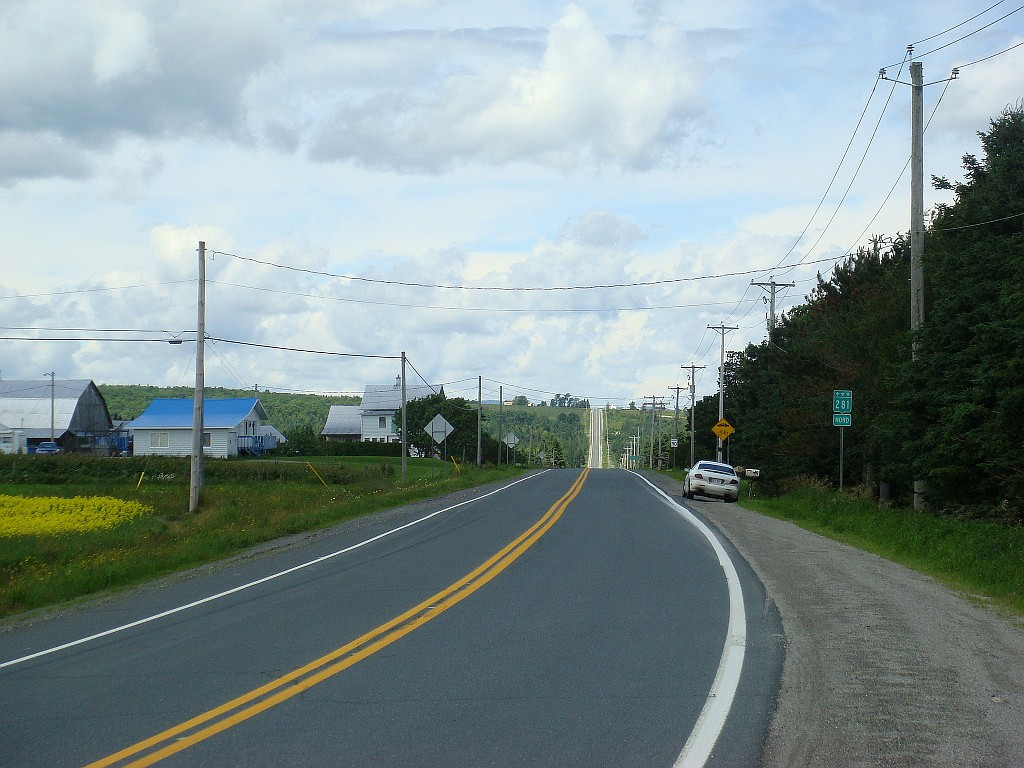
Quebec Route 281 at Saint-Camille-de-Lellis

- Saint-Camille-de-Lellis
- Saint-Magloire
- Saint-Philémon
- Armagh
- Saint-Raphaël
- La Durantaye
- Saint-Michel-de-Bellechasse

== See also ==
- List of Quebec provincial highways
