= Quebec Route 283 =

Highway in Quebec, Canada

Route 283

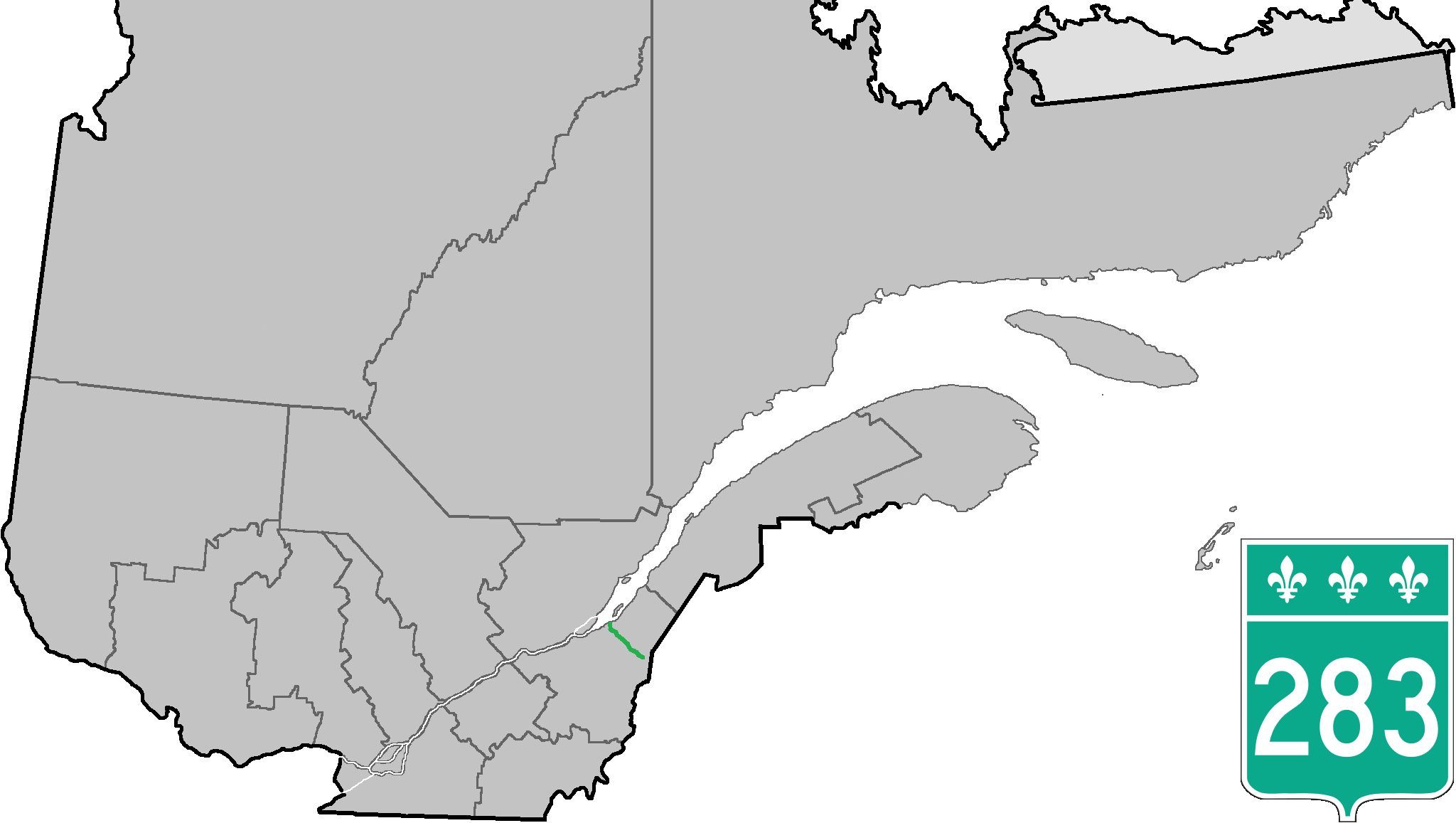

Route information
- Length: 73 km (45 mi)

Major junctions
- South end: R-204 in Sainte-Lucie-de-Beauregard
- A-20 (TCH) in Montmagny
- North end: R-132 in Montmagny

Location
- Country: Canada
- Province: Quebec
- Major cities: Montmagny, Saint-Fabien-de-Panet

Highway system
- Quebec provincial highways; Autoroutes; List; Former
← R-281	→ R-285

Route 283 is a 73 km (?) two-lane north/south highway in the Chaudière-Appalaches region in the province of Quebec, Canada. Its northern terminus is in Montmagny at the junction of Route 132 and its southern terminus is close to Saint-Lucie-de-Beauregard at the junction of Route 204.

== Towns along Route 283 ==
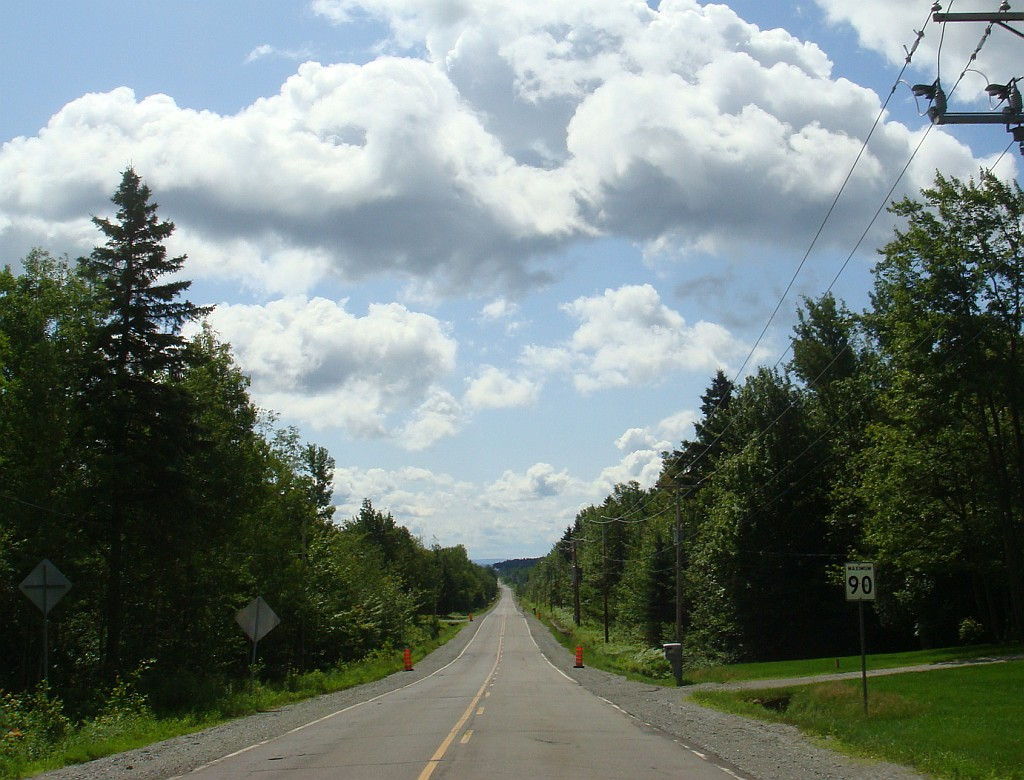
Quebec Route 283 at Saint-Fabien-de-Panet

- Montmagny
- Notre-Dame-du-Rosaire
- Saint-Fabien-de-Panet
- Lac-Frontière
- Sainte-Lucie-de-Beauregard

== See also ==
- List of Quebec provincial highways
