= Montmagny Regional County Municipality =

Montmagny
- Regional county municipality
- Coordinates: 46°50′N 70°24′W
- Country: Canada
- Province: Quebec
- Region: Chaudière-Appalaches
- Effective: January 1, 1982
- County seat: Montmagny

Government
  - Type: Prefecture
  - Prefect: Frédéric Jean

Area
  - Total: 1,726.5 km^{2} (666.6 sq mi)
  - Land: 1,695.09 km^{2} (654.48 sq mi)

Population (2021)
  - Total: 22,481
  - Density: 13.3/km^{2} (34/sq mi)
  - Change (2016-21): ▼1.0%
  - Dwellings: 12,256
- Time zone: UTC−5 (EST)
  - Summer (DST): UTC−4 (EDT)
- Area codes: 418 and 581
- Website: www.montmagny.com

Montmagny (French pronunciation: [mɔ̃maɲi]) is a regional county municipality (RCM) in the Chaudière-Appalaches region of Quebec, Canada. Montmagny is the seat. Its neighbouring RCMs are Bellechasse, Les Etchemins, and L'Islet.

This area was named after Charles de Montmagny, a governor of New France.

== Geography ==
Its territory can be divided into three main geographical areas. The first is constituted of the estuary of the Saint Lawrence River and its islands. Second are the plains, which includes the Saint Lawrence Lowlands, which run from east to west and covers the northern portion of the Montmagny RCM, and is characterized by its arable soils. The Appalachians is the final geographic region of the area, taking up approximately 80% of the area. A series of peaks and ledges can be found here, and the Notre Dame Mountains dominate its landscape, which can reach an altitude of up to 850 metres (2,790 ft). Mixed forest covers the south of the RCM.

=== Subdivisions ===
There are 14 subdivisions within the RCM:

Cities & Towns (1)

- Montmagny

Municipalities (9)

- Berthier-sur-Mer
- Cap-Saint-Ignace
- Lac-Frontière
- Notre-Dame-du-Rosaire
- Sainte-Euphémie-sur-Rivière-du-Sud
- Sainte-Lucie-de-Beauregard
- Saint-François-de-la-Rivière-du-Sud
- Saint-Just-de-Bretenières
- Saint-Paul-de-Montminy

Parishes (4)

- Saint-Antoine-de-l'Isle-aux-Grues
- Sainte-Apolline-de-Patton
- Saint-Fabien-de-Panet
- Saint-Pierre-de-la-Rivière-du-Sud

=== Hydrography ===
South River and its main tributary, Bras Saint-Nicolas, are two rivers that form the water system that drains into the Saint Lawrence River. To the east of the Notre Dame Mountains, the Daaquam and Northwest Black River feed into the Saint John River of Maine.

== Demographics ==
Canada census – Montmagny Regional County Municipality community profile

	2021	2016
Population	22,481 (-1.0% from 2016)	22,698 (-0.8% from 2011)
Land area	1,695.09 km^{2} (654.48 sq mi)	1,698.13 km^{2} (655.65 sq mi)
Population density	13.3/km^{2} (34/sq mi)	13.4/km^{2} (35/sq mi)
Median age	52.8 (M: 52.0, F: 54.0)	51.2 (M: 50.0, F: 52.1)
Private dwellings	12,256 (total) 10,793 (occupied)	12,079 (total) 10,421 (occupied)
Median household income	$58,400	$49,649

References: 2021 2016

Historical census populations – Montmagny Regional County Municipality

Year	Pop.	±%
1986	24,794	—
1991	23,667	−4.5%
1996	23,794	+0.5%
2001	23,438	−1.5%

Year	Pop.	±%
2006	23,201	−1.0%
2011	22,877	−1.4%
2016	22,698	−0.8%
2021	22,481	−1.0%

Source: Statistics Canada

== Economy ==
Generally speaking, the primary activity in the northern part of the RCM is agriculture, while forestry dominates the south. The city of Montmagny, which is home to more than half of the population of the RCM, is the economic centre of the region in which many industrial and commercial activities, and even some of the economic activity in the Côte-du-Sud.

The majority of the businesses can be found along a straight line, several kilometres long, on the Saint Lawrence River (Route 132) and along the Trans-Canada Highway. The other part of the region, which is almost 80% of the area, wherein the main activities are forestry, the gathering of raw materials related to wood, and services, is located in the Appalachians. It has developed recently alongside the service and tourism industries.

A significant proportion of income for the inhabitants is ensured by the manufacturing sector. According to statistics from 1996, more than 30% of the population works in these types of industries. As a whole, the industrial sector is dominated by refineries and traditional manufacturing. Therefore, jobs are concentrated in the areas of wood, furniture, metalworking, textiles, agriculture, and printing.

Finally, the tertiary industries take up more than 2/3 of the workers in the RCM. Wholesale and retail stores are at the forefront of the region's economic activity. Lodging, restaurants, business services, and commercial/personal services, such as health and social services, employ many people of the region.

=== Agriculture ===
Agriculture plays a significant role in the economic development of the RCM. Even though it takes up less than 10% of the population of the territory, this industry generates income higher than $38 million per year in the region.

Agriculture occupies 190.21 square kilometres (73.44 mi^{2}), mostly in the fertile Saint Lawrence lowlands. In this area, one may also find the highest population density and the main industrial areas. Forestry dominates the southern part of the RCM, which houses several primary industries, a sparse density, and limited arable land. The forested area of the RCM takes up 1,289.28 square kilometres (497.79 mi^{2}), some 77% of its territory.

== Transportation ==
=== Access Routes ===
Highways and numbered routes that run through the municipality, including external routes that start or finish at the county border:

- Autoroutes
  - A-20 (TCH)
- Principal Highways
  - R-132
- Secondary Highways
  - R-204
  - R-216
  - R-228
  - R-283
- External Routes
  - None

== See also ==
- List of regional county municipalities and equivalent territories in Quebec
