= Bras de Riche =

River in Chaudière-Appalaches, Quebec (Canada)

- Location within Quebec

Location
- Country: Canada
- Province: Quebec
- Region: Chaudière-Appalaches
- MRC: Montmagny Regional County Municipality

Physical characteristics
- Source: Lake Bringé
  - location: Saint-Cyrille-de-Lessard
  - coordinates: 47.108943°N 70.168791°W
  - elevation: 516 metres (1,693 ft)
- Mouth: Bras Saint-Nicolas
  - location: Saint-Cyrille-de-Lessard
  - coordinates: 47.045°N 70.30444°W
  - elevation: 150 metres (490 ft)
- Length: 11.3 kilometres (7.0 mi)

Basin features
- Progression: Bras Saint-Nicolas, rivière du Sud (Montmagny), St. Lawrence River
- Tributaries
  - left: (upstream)
  - right: (upstream)

The Bras de Riche (in English: Arm of Rich) flows in the municipalities of Saint-Cyrille-de-Lessard, Saint-Aubert and L'Islet (Saint-Eugène sector), in the L'Islet Regional County Municipality, in the administrative region of Chaudière-Appalaches, in Quebec, in Canada.

The "Bras de Riche" is a tributary of the east bank of the Bras Saint-Nicolas, which flows on the south-east bank of the rivière du Sud (Montmagny); the latter flows north-east to the south shore of the St. Lawrence River.

== Geography ==
The main neighboring watersheds of Bras de Riche are:

- north side: Sauvage stream, Tortue River (L'Islet);
- east side: Bras de la rivière Ouelle, Bras du Nord-Est, Tenturette River, Grand Calder River;
- south side: Bras d'Apic, Bras du Nord-Est, Méchant Pouce River;
- west side: Petit Moulin River (L'Islet), rivière des Perdrix, Bras Saint-Nicolas.

The "Bras de Riche" takes its source at Lake Bringé (length: 0.8 kilometres (0.50 mi); altitude: 517 metres (1,696 ft)), located in a mountainous area, located at the limit between Saint-Cyrille-de-Lessard and Saint-Aubert. This head lake is located southeast of Trois Saumons lake and 12.3 kilometres (7.6 mi) southeast of the south shore of the St. Lawrence River.

From this head lake, the "Bras de Riche" flows over 11.3 kilometres (7.0 mi), with a drop of 366 metres (1,201 ft), divided into the following segments:

- 1.3 kilometres (0.81 mi) southwesterly in Saint-Cyrille-de-Lessard, to the municipal limit of Saint-Aubert;
- 3.2 kilometres (2.0 mi) southwesterly, up to the limit of Saint-Cyrille-de-Lessard;
- 2.7 kilometres (1.7 mi) south-west, to a country road;
- 5.2 kilometres (3.2 mi) southwest, to route 285;
- 1.0 kilometre (0.62 mi) towards the west, collecting the waters of the Bras du Nord-Est (coming from the south), until the limit between Saint-Cyrille-de-Lessard and L'Islet (Saint-Eugène sector);
- 0.6 kilometres (0.37 mi) northwesterly, up to its confluence.

The "Bras de Riche" empties on the east bank of the Bras Saint-Nicolas. This confluence is located upstream from the bridge at a place called "Les Chandelles", downstream from the "Toupin waterfall" and 2.9 kilometres (1.8 mi) north-west of the center of the village of Saint-Cyrille-de-Lessard.

== Toponymy ==
The toponym "Bras de Riche" was made official on May 31, 1983, at the Commission de toponymie du Québec.

== See also ==
- List of rivers of Quebec
