= Bras du Nord-Est =

River in Chaudière-Appalaches, Quebec (Canada)

- Location within Quebec

Location
- Country: Canada
- Province: Quebec
- Region: Chaudière-Appalaches
- MRC: L'Islet Regional County Municipality

Physical characteristics
- Source: Lac des Plaines
  - location: Saint-Cyrille-de-Lessard
  - coordinates: 47.066117°N 70.138691°W
  - elevation: 390 metres (1,280 ft)
- Mouth: Bras de Riche
  - location: Saint-Cyrille-de-Lessard
  - coordinates: 47.0475°N 70.30389°W
  - elevation: 174 metres (571 ft)
- Length: 24.7 kilometres (15.3 mi)

Basin features
- Progression: Bras de Riche, Bras Saint-Nicolas, rivière du Sud (Montmagny), St. Lawrence River
- Tributaries
  - left: (upstream) Ruisseau Saint-Lambert
  - right: (upstream)

The Bras du Nord-Est (in English: North-East Arm) flows entirely in the municipality of Saint-Cyrille-de-Lessard, in the L'Islet Regional County Municipality, in the administrative region of Chaudière-Appalaches, in Québec, in Canada.

The "Bras du Nord-Est" is a tributary of the south bank of the Bras de Riche which flows to the east bank of Bras Saint-Nicolas which empties on the south-eastern bank of the rivière du Sud (Montmagny); the latter flows north-east to the south shore of the St. Lawrence River.

== Geography ==
The main watersheds neighbors of the Northeast Arm are:

- North side: Bras de Riche, Sauvage brook, Trois Saumons lake;
- east side: Bras de la rivière Ouelle, Ouelle River, Grand Calder River;
- south side: Bras d'Apic, Bouteille stream, Méchant Pouce River;
- west side: rivière des Perdrix, Bras Saint-Nicolas.

The "Bras du Nord-Est" takes its source at "lac des Plaines" (length: 2.3 kilometres (1.4 mi); altitude: 390 metres (1,280 ft)), located in a mountainous area, located in north side of the boundary between Saint-Cyrille-de-Lessard and Tourville. This head lake is located southeast of Lac Trois Saumons, north of Lac Therrien and 16.1 kilometres (10.0 mi) southeast of the south shore of the St. Lawrence River.

From this head lake, the "Bras du Nord-Est" flows over 24.7 kilometres (15.3 mi), divided into the following segments:

- 16.6 kilometres (10.3 mi) west in Saint-Cyrille-de-Lessard, to a road that the river cuts at 2.2 kilometres (1.4 mi) to the northeast the village of Saint-Cyrille-de-Lessard;
- 2.5 kilometres (1.6 mi) west, up to route 285 which the river intersects at 0.8 kilometres (0.50 mi) north-west of village of Saint-Cyrille-de-Lessard;
- 3.4 kilometres (2.1 mi) north-west, up to its confluence.

The "Bras du Nord-Est" flows onto the south shore of the Bras de Riche. This confluence is located 2.3 kilometres (1.4 mi) north-west of the center of the village of Saint-Cyrille-de-Lessard.

== Toponymy ==
The toponym "Bras du Nord-Est" was made official on May 31, 1983, at the Commission de toponymie du Québec.

== See also ==
- St. Lawrence River
- Rivière du Sud (Montmagny), a stream
- Bras Saint-Nicolas, a stream
- Bras de Riche, a stream
- Saint-Cyrille-de-Lessard, a municipality
- L'Islet Regional County Municipality (MRC)
- List of rivers of Quebec
