= Bras d'Apic =

River in Chaudière-Appalaches, Quebec (Canada)

- Location within Quebec

Location
- Country: Canada
- Province: Quebec
- Region: Chaudière-Appalaches
- MRC: Montmagny Regional County Municipality

Physical characteristics
- Source: Lake d'Apic
  - location: Sainte-Apolline-de-Patton
  - coordinates: 46.909912°N 70.154503°W
  - elevation: 406 metres (1,332 ft)
- Mouth: Bras Saint-Nicolas
  - location: Saint-Cyrille-de-Lessard
  - coordinates: 47.02778°N 70.31472°W
  - elevation: 180 metres (590 ft)
- Length: 26.4 kilometres (16.4 mi)

Basin features
- Progression: Bras Saint-Nicolas, rivière du Sud (Montmagny), St. Lawrence River
- Tributaries
  - left: (upstream)
  - right: (upstream) Ruisseau de la Bouteille, Bras de l'Est

The Bras d'Apic (in English: Apic Arm) is a river which flows in the municipalities of Saint-Marcel and Saint-Cyrille-de-Lessard, in the L'Islet Regional County Municipality, in the administrative region of Chaudière-Appalaches, in Quebec, in Canada.

The "Bras d'Apic" is a tributary of the east bank of Bras Saint-Nicolas which flows to the south-east bank of the rivière du Sud (Montmagny); the latter flows north-east to the south shore of the St. Lawrence River.

== Geography ==
The main watersheds neighboring Bras d'Apic are:

- north side: Northeast arm, Bras de Riche, Carlos stream;
- east side: Bras de Riche, Bras de la rivière Ouelle, Tenturette River, Grand Calder River;
- south side: Great Noire River, Buckley River, Rocheuse River, Méchant Pouce River;
- west side: Rivière du Petit Moulin, rivière des Perdrix, Bras Saint-Nicolas.

The arm of Apic has its source at Lake Apic (length: 1.0 kilometre (0.62 mi); altitude: 406 metres (1,332 ft)), located in a mountainous area, in the canton of Arago of Saint-Marcel. This lake is located on the northwest side of the watershed with the Tenturette River, the current of which flows south to the hydrographic slope of the Great Black River (or Big Black River, in Maine (States-United)); the latter being a tributary of the Saint John River which crosses Maine and New Brunswick.

From Apic Lake, the Apic arm flows over 26.4 kilometres (16.4 mi), divided into the following segments:

- 2.7 kilometres (1.7 mi) north-west in Saint-Marcel, up to the municipal limit of Saint-Cyrille-de-Lessard;
- 9.6 kilometres (6.0 mi) northward, more or less along route 285 and passing through the hamlet Bras-d'Apic, until at the northern limit of the Beaubien township;
- 0.4 kilometres (0.25 mi) northward, up to the confluence of the eastern arm (coming from the southeast);
- 5.8 kilometres (3.6 mi) northwesterly in Saint-Cyrille-de-Lessard, along more or less route 285, to the Chemin du 8th rank;
- 4.6 kilometres (2.9 mi) north-west, to Chemin Lessard Ouest, which it intersects at 1.2 kilometres (0.75 mi) south-west of the center of the village of Saint-Cyrille-de-Lessard;
- 3.3 kilometres (2.1 mi) westward, crossing the "Taupin Falls", to its confluence.

Bras d'Apic empties onto the south bank of the Bras Saint-Nicolas which flows north, then south-west to flow onto the south-east bank of the rivière du Sud (Montmagny). This confluence is located downstream of the Pierre-Noël road bridge, i.e. 3.4 kilometres (2.1 mi) west of the center of the village of Saint-Cyrille-de-Lessard.

== Toponymy ==
The toponym "Bras d'Apic" was made official on December 2, 1975, at the Commission de toponymie du Québec.

== See also ==
- List of rivers of Quebec
