= Rivière du Petit Moulin =

River in L'Islet in Quebec, Canada

- Location within Quebec

Location
- Country: Canada
- Province: Quebec
- Region: Chaudière-Appalaches
- MRC: L'Islet Regional County Municipality

Physical characteristics
- Source: Agricultural stream
  - location: L'Islet
  - coordinates: 47.065151°N 70.293334°W
  - elevation: 233 metres (764 ft)
- Mouth: Tortue South-West River
  - location: L'Islet
  - coordinates: 47.10861°N 70.35083°W
  - elevation: 29 metres (95 ft)
- Length: 8.7 kilometres (5.4 mi)

Basin features
- Tributaries
  - left: (upstream)
  - right: (upstream) Ruisseau Sauvage

The rivière du Petit Moulin (in English: Little River of the Mill) is a tributary of the south bank of the Tortue River South-West, which flows north-east to empty on the west bank of the Tortue river; the latter flows north and empties onto the south shore of the St. Lawrence River, east of the village of L'Islet-sur-Mer.

The Petit Moulin river flows exclusively in the municipality of L'Islet, in the L'Islet Regional County Municipality, in the administrative region of Chaudière-Appalaches, in Quebec, in Canada.

== Geography ==
The Petit Moulin river has its source east of Bras Saint-Nicolas, in the Saint-Eugène sector, of L'Islet. This spring is located in an agricultural zone to the southeast of the highway 20, at 4.2 kilometres (2.6 mi) to the southeast of the south shore of the St. Lawrence River, at 3.4 kilometres (2.1 mi) north-west of the center of the village of Saint-Cyrille-de-Lessard and at 3.8 kilometres (2.4 mi) to the south-east from the center of the village of Saint-Eugène.

From its source, the Petit Moulin river flows over 8.7 kilometres (5.4 mi).

The Petit Moulin river flows on the south bank of the Tortue River South-West. This confluence is located 2.2 kilometres (1.4 mi) southeast of the south shore of the St. Lawrence River, 4.0 kilometres (2.5 mi) upstream from the confluence of the Tortue River South-West and on the northeast side of the village of L'Islet.

== Toponymy ==
Formerly, when a river had a sawmill or a flour mill, French Canadian parishioners popularly designated this watercourse as the Rivière du Moulin. "The mill was usually erected in a place where the drop was more significant in order to be able to take advantage of the power of water to drive the turbines and where road access was favorable. In addition, in winter, the ice roads on the rivers allowed the transport of the cut logs to the sawmills. cartographers and surveyors have retained the popular appellation in official documents, especially geographic maps.

The toponym Rivière du Petit Moulin was formalized on December 5, 1968, at the Commission de toponymie du Québec.

== See also ==
- St. Lawrence River
- List of rivers of Quebec
