= Bras Saint-Nicolas =

River in Chaudière-Appalaches, Quebec (Canada)

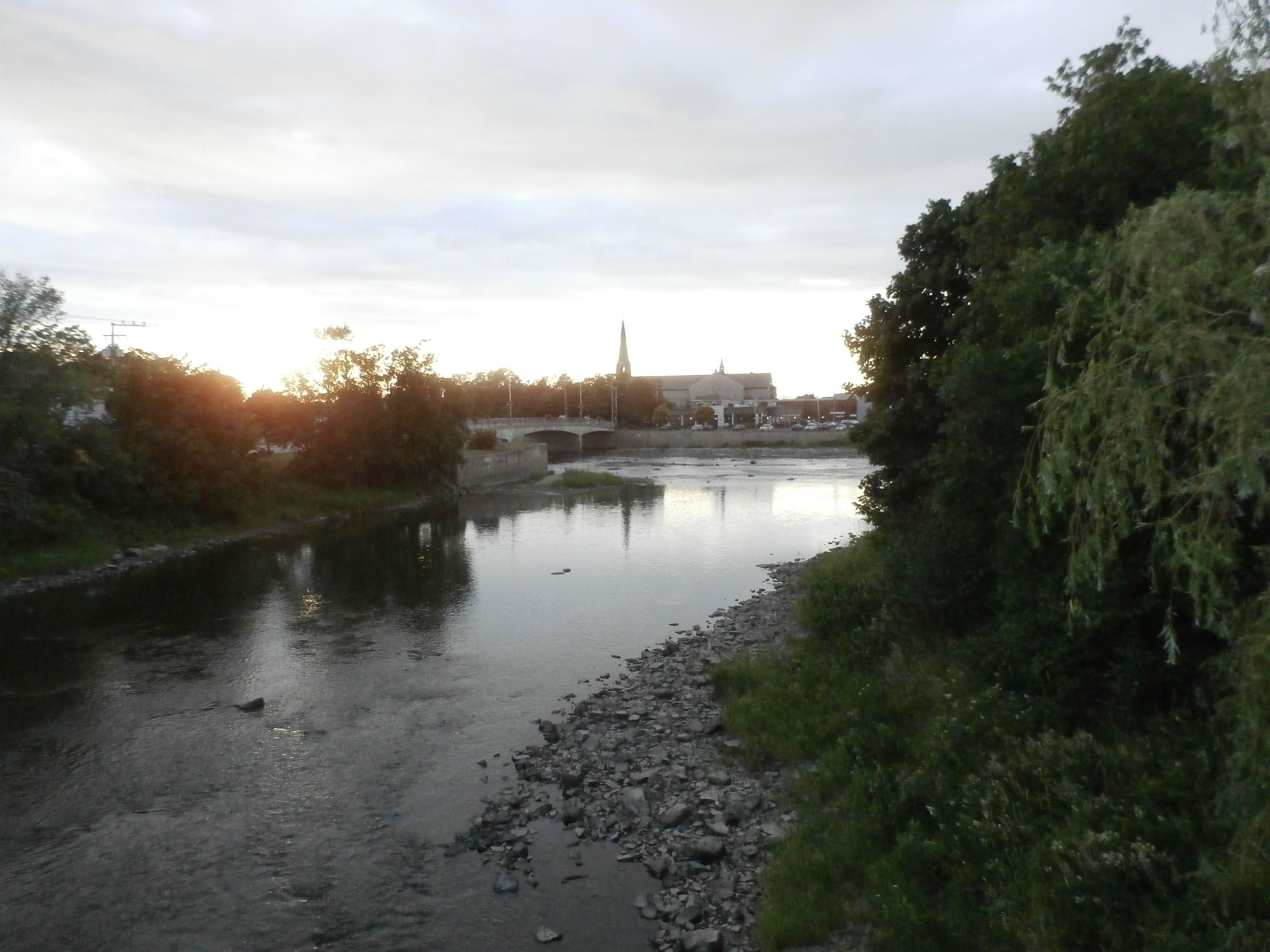
- Confluence of the Bras Saint-Nicolas with the rivière du Sud (Montmagny) at Montmagny.

- Location within Quebec

Location
- Country: Canada
- Province: Quebec
- Region: Chaudière-Appalaches
- MRC: Montmagny Regional County Municipality

Physical characteristics
- Source: Agricultural streams
  - location: Sainte-Apolline-de-Patton
  - coordinates: 46.916343°N 70.254113°W
  - elevation: 361 metres (1,184 ft)
- Mouth: Rivière du Sud (Montmagny)
  - location: Montmagny
  - coordinates: 46.97972°N 70.55444°W
  - elevation: 10 metres (33 ft)
- Length: 45.5 kilometres (28.3 mi)

Basin features
- Progression: Rivière du Sud (Montmagny), St. Lawrence River
- Tributaries
  - left: (upstream) rivière des Perdrix, rivière des Gagnon, ruisseau Normand, ruisseau des Castors, ruisseau Aubert, ruisseau Guimont, Cloutier River, ruisseau Fortin
  - right: (upstream)

The Bras Saint-Nicolas (in English: Saint-Nicolas Arm) is a tributary of the south-eastern bank of the rivière du Sud (Montmagny), which flows north-east to the south bank of the St. Lawrence River.

The Bras Saint-Nicolas flows in the municipalities of Sainte-Apolline-de-Patton, Cap-Saint-Ignace, Saint-Cyrille-de-Lessard, Saint-Eugène, Notre-Dame-de-Bonsecours and Montmagny, in the Montmagny Regional County Municipality, in the administrative region of Chaudière-Appalaches, in Quebec, in Canada.

== Geography ==
The main neighboring watersheds of Bras Saint-Nicolas are:

- north side: St. Lawrence River, Tortue River (L'Islet);
- east side: rivière des Perdrix, brook Guimont, Bras du Nord-Est, Trois Saumons River;
- south side: Paul brook, Le Grand Ruisseau, Cloutier River, Morigeau River, rivière des Poitras, rivière du Sud (Montmagny), rivière des Perdrix;
- west side: rivière du Sud (Montmagny).

The Bras Saint-Nicolas has its source at the confluence of the Méchant Pouce River and Fortin stream, in the municipality of Sainte-Apolline-de-Patton. This spring is located on the west side of the hamlet "L'Espérance", on the north slope of the Notre Dame Mountains.

From its source, the Bras Saint-Nicolas flows over 45.5 kilometres (28.3 mi), divided into the following segments:

Upper course of the river

- 2.2 kilometres (1.4 mi) northwesterly in Sainte-Apolline-de-Patton, to the bridge at the municipal boundary of Cap-Saint-Ignace;
- 4.1 kilometres (2.5 mi) northward in Cap-Saint-Ignace, collecting water from the Cloutier River, to a forest road;
- 5.4 kilometres (3.4 mi) towards the north-west in Cap-Saint-Ignace, collecting the discharge of Isidore lake (coming from the east), up to the municipal limit of Saint-Cyrille-de-Lessard;
- 6.5 kilometres (4.0 mi) north in Saint-Cyrille-de-Lessard, collecting water from the Guimont stream and Bras d'Apic, crossing a series of waterfalls and rapids, up to the municipal limit of Saint-Eugène;
- 3.4 kilometres (2.1 mi) north-west, collecting water from Bras de Riche, until you reach a road;

Lower course of the river

- 4.3 kilometres (2.7 mi) west, to a road;
- 2.1 kilometres (1.3 mi) southwesterly in Saint-Eugène, to the municipal limit of Cap-Saint-Ignace;
- 2.0 kilometres (1.2 mi) southwesterly in Cap-Saint-Ignace, to the highway 20 bridge;
- 1.7 kilometres (1.1 mi) west, up to the bridge;
- 2.2 kilometres (1.4 mi) towards the southwest, passing south of the village of Cap-Saint-Ignace, to the road;
- 3.7 kilometres (2.3 mi) southwesterly, along highway 20, to a road bridge;
- 3.0 kilometres (1.9 mi) southwesterly in Cap-Saint-Ignace, to the municipal limit of Montmagny;
- 4.9 kilometres (3.0 mi) towards the south-west, collecting the waters of the rivière des Perdrix (coming from the south-east), then towards the northwest to its confluence.

The Bras Saint-Nicolas empties onto the south-eastern bank of the rivière du Sud (Montmagny). This confluence is located upstream from the route 132 bridge, downstream from the route 283 bridge, in the heart of the village of Montmagny.

== Toponymy ==
In a lower segment, parallel to the St. Lawrence River, the Bras Saint-Nicolas meanders at an altitude of about fifteen meters, crossing a stronghold granted in 1672 to Nicolas Gamache by the intendant Jean Talon. A first hypothesis associates the origin of the toponym "Bras Saint-Nicolas" with this pioneer. Another hypothesis is rather referred to other to Nicolas Després, father of Geneviève Després whose husband, Louis Couillard de Lespinay, had bought the seigneury of Rivière-du-Sud in 1654 and 1655.

In 1802, the toponym “R. St. Nicholas' appears on a map by surveyor Samuel Holland. In 1803, the toponym appeared on a map of Vondenvelden with the generic Bras. In 1815, Joseph Bouchette also identified it by the same generic, a term used to designate a tributary or a subdivision of a watercourse.

The toponym "Bras Saint-Nicolas" was made official on December 5, 1968, at the Commission de toponymie du Québec.

== List of bridges ==
Sleepers	Photo	Municipality (ies)	Year of construction	Road	Length	Bridge type
Bridge 05076		Cap-Saint-Ignace	1939	Route of Hope	28.1 metres (92 ft)	Reinforced concrete girder bridge
Pierre-Noël Bridge		Saint-Cyrille-de-Lessard	1952	Route Pierre-Noël	17.9 metres (59 ft)	Steel-timber bridge
Bernier Bridge		L'Islet	1891	Norman path	54.8 metres (180 ft)	Bridge with intermediate steel deck
Fafard Bridge		L'Islet	1966	Lamartine Road West	57.1 metres (187 ft)	Reinforced concrete girder bridge
Bridge 05075S		Cap-Saint-Ignace	1966	Highway 20 East	85.3 metres (280 ft)	Steel girder bridge
Bridge 05075N		Cap-Saint-Ignace	1970	Highway 20 West	85.3 metres (280 ft)	Steel girder bridge
Blanchet Bridge		Cap-Saint-Ignace	1929	Four-Chemins Road	70.5 metres (231 ft)	Lower steel deck bridge
Bridge 13999		Cap-Saint-Ignace	1970	Route du Petit-Cap	75.7 metres (248 ft)	Precast prestressed concrete girder bridge
Bridge 05081		Cap-Saint-Ignace	1930	Bellavance Road	55.5 metres (182 ft)	Steel-wood bridge
Bridge 10810		Montmagny	1891	Cloutier Street	55.6 metres (182 ft)	Lower steel deck bridge
Railway bridge		Montmagny		Canadian National Railway		Steel girder bridge
Bridge 05131		Montmagny	1957	Saint-Ignace Street	47.0 metres (154.2 ft)	Reinforced concrete portal bridge

== See also ==
- St. Lawrence River
- Rivière du Sud (Montmagny), a stream
- Sainte-Apolline-de-Patton, a municipality
- Cap-Saint-Ignace, a municipality
- Saint-Cyrille-de-Lessard, a municipality
- Saint-Eugène, a municipality
- Notre-Dame-de-Bonsecours, a municipality
- Montmagny, a municipality
- Montmagny Regional County Municipality (MRC)
