= Vincelotte River =

River in L'Islet and Kamouraska in Quebec (Canada)

Vincellotte River
- Location within Quebec
- Native name: Rivière Vincelotte (French)

Location
- Country: Canada
- Province: Quebec
- Region: Chaudière-Appalaches
- MRC: L'Islet Regional County Municipality, Montmagny Regional County Municipality

Physical characteristics
- Source: Agricultural stream
  - location: Saint-Eugène
  - coordinates: 47.076279°N 70.400011°W
  - elevation: 31 metres (102 ft)
- Mouth: St. Lawrence River
  - location: Cap-Saint-Ignace
  - coordinates: 47.06055°N 70.45583°W
  - elevation: 4 metres (13 ft)
- Length: 5.1 kilometres (3.2 mi)

Basin features
- Tributaries
  - left: (upstream)
  - right: (upstream)

The Vincelotte River (in French: rivière Vincelotte) is a tributary on the south shore of the St. Lawrence River where it flows east of the village of Cap-Saint-Ignace.

This watercourse flows in the municipalities of Saint-Eugène (MRC de L'Islet Regional County Municipality) and Cap-Saint-Ignace, (MRC of Montmagny Regional County Municipality), in the administrative region of Chaudière-Appalaches, in Quebec, in Canada.

== Geography ==
The Vincelotte river takes its source at the confluence of the Bélanger and Caouette streams. This spring is located in an agricultural zone to the northwest of the Canadian National railway line in the municipality of Saint-Eugène, at 2.5 kilometres (1.6 mi) east of the south shore of the middle estuary of the St. Lawrence, at 5.6 kilometres (3.5 mi) west of the center of the village of Saint-Eugène and at 5.7 kilometres (3.5 mi) east of the village of L'Islet.

From its source, the Vincelotte river flows over 5.1 kilometres (3.2 mi), divided into the following segments:

- 1.8 kilometres (1.1 mi) towards the southwest, in Saint-Eugène, to the limit of Cap-Saint-Ignace;
- 8.8 kilometres (5.5 mi) towards the southwest in an agricultural zone, until its confluence.

At the end of its course, the Vincelotte river flows onto the long shore (at low tide) of Anse du Cap, on the south shore of the St. Lawrence River. This confluence is located 2.9 kilometres (1.8 mi) north of the village of Cap-Saint-Ignace and south-west of the village of L'Islet-sur-Mer.

== Toponymy ==
The toponym Rivière Vincelotte evokes Charles-Joseph Amiot (Amyot) de Vincelotte (born on March 23, 1665, in Quebec - died on May 9, 1735, in Quebec). He was a navigator, a lieutenant in the navy, a militia commander, a lord. Charles Amiot de Vincelotte had married, on February 19, 1691, in Montreal, Marie-Gabrielle Philippe de Hautmesnil; 13 children came from this union.

After his primary studies at the Jesuit college in Quebec, he studied navigation. In 1680, he received from his mother the stronghold of Vincelotte (Cap-Saint-Ignace) that Talon had assigned to him in 1672. In 1684, at the age of 19, Charles-Joseph enlisted in the militia. He initialed a will the same year, before leaving “to travel and go to war for the service of the King and the Iroquois”. In 1693, he presented a request - which was to be approved - to Louis de Buade de Frontenac and Jean Bochart de Champigny in order to enlarge his fief, wishing, he wrote, "to contribute with all his to be able to increase this colony and to work hard to establish itself there ”.

In 1703–1704, Amiot took part in some expeditions to the coasts of Newfoundland. In 1706 he was chosen to race the coast of New England as a lieutenant, under the command of Louis Denys de La Ronde. In particular, they had to fight a hard battle against March who besieged Port-Royal (Acadia) (Annapolis Royal, Nova Scotia) on May 26, 1707. Having achieved the victory, they bring the news to the king of France; they then asked for help with an expedition against the city of Boston. Despite the approval of the project, the French government cannot assign them other vessels than the Venus; a rather poor frigate, on which they nevertheless sailed for two years, taking numerous catches. The last reference of his activity in this field is in 1727, when he was appointed commander of the militias of the south coast.

The toponym Rivière Vincelotte was formalized on December 5, 1968, at the Commission de toponymie du Québec.

== Nature reserve ==
With an area of 1.78 hectares (4.4 acres), the “Meander-of-the-river-Vincelotte Nature Reserve” was opened to the public at the end of its development in summer 2013. These developments included in particular a 300 metres (980 ft) footpath with interpretive panels giving access to the St. Lawrence River and a picnic area accessible to pedestrians and cyclists. The bridge spanning the Vincelotte river has also been restored. In the summer of 2011, in addition to the infrastructure, native trees and shrubs were planted there to promote arborescent vegetation.

This property, which was acquired in 2009 by the “Nature Foundation”, was designated a “nature reserve” in 2011 by the Ministry of Sustainable Development, the Environment, Wildlife and Parks. The acquisition and its development were made possible thanks to the contribution of the “Hydro-Quebec Foundation for the Environment” and a set of public and private partners.

This nature reserve is located opposite the Isle-aux-Grues, thus offering a magnificent panorama of the river. This reserve is a stopover for cyclists in transit on the green route. Interpretive panels, a picnic table and park benches have been set up along the route.

The avian fauna is abundant there and the flora is varied. On the river side, visitors can observe a small pond built by the former owners. This pond attracts many shorebirds and various species of waterfowl. The adjacent flats are a feeding and resting area for migratory and aquatic birds. A segment of the coastline adjacent to the reserve is home to a large population of Victorin's water hemlock, a plant species endemic to the freshwater estuary of the St. Lawrence River, considered threatened.

== See also ==
- List of rivers of Quebec
