= Cloutier River =

River in Chaudière-Appalaches, Quebec, Canada

- Location within Quebec
- Native name: Rivière Cloutier (French)

Location
- Country: Canada
- Province: Quebec
- Region: Chaudière-Appalaches
- MRC: Montmagny Regional County Municipality

Physical characteristics
- Source: Mountain and forest streams
  - location: Sainte-Apolline-de-Patton
  - coordinates: 46.832372°N 70.279166°W
  - elevation: 455 metres (1,493 ft)
- Mouth: St. Lawrence River
  - location: Sainte-Apolline-de-Patton
  - coordinates: 46.91833°N 70.25916°W
  - elevation: 360 metres (1,180 ft)
- Length: 16.9 kilometres (10.5 mi)

Basin features
- Progression: Bras Saint-Nicolas, rivière du Sud (Montmagny), St. Lawrence River
- Tributaries
  - left: (upstream)
  - right: (upstream)

The Cloutier river (in French: rivière Cloutier) flows in the municipalities of Sainte-Apolline-de-Patton, Notre-Dame-du-Rosaire, Cap-Saint-Ignace, in the Montmagny Regional County Municipality, in the administrative region of Chaudière-Appalaches, in Quebec, in Canada.

The Cloutier river is a tributary of the southwest shore of the Bras Saint-Nicolas, which flows on the southeast shore of the rivière du Sud (Montmagny); the latter flows north-east to the south shore of the St. Lawrence River.

== Geography ==
The main neighboring watersheds of the Cloutier river are:

- north side: St. Lawrence River, Bras Saint-Nicolas, Inconnue River;
- east side: Bras Saint-Nicolas, Méchant Pouce River;
- south side: rivière du Sud (Montmagny), Fraser River, Alick River;
- west side: rivière des Perdrix, rivière du Sud (Montmagny).

The Cloutier river "has its source on the northern slope of the Notre Dame Mountains, in the municipality of Sainte-Apolline-de-Patton. Several branches of mountain and forest streams feed the head of the Cloutier river.

From its source, the Cloutier river flows over 16.9 kilometres (10.5 mi), with a drop of 95 metres (312 ft), divided into the following segments:

- 4.8 kilometres (3.0 mi) towards the north by pronouncing a curve towards the west, in Sainte-Apolline-de-Patton, to the limit of Notre-Dame-du-Rosaire;
- 1.1 kilometres (0.68 mi) northward, up to the limit of the townships of Ashburton (Notre-Dame-du-Rosaire) and Bourdages (Sainte-Apolline-de-Patton);
- 7.3 kilometres (4.5 mi) northeasterly, up to the limit between Sainte-Apolline-de-Patton and Cap-Saint-Ignace;
- 0.6 kilometres (0.37 mi) by forming a loop towards the north in Cap-Saint-Ignace, up to the limit of Sainte-Apolline-de-Patton;
- 3.1 kilometres (1.9 mi) northeasterly, up to its confluence.

The Cloutier river flows on the southwest bank of the Bras Saint-Nicolas. This confluence is located upstream of the "Great lock" and downstream of the mouth of the Méchant Pouce River.

== Toponymy ==
The toponym Rivière Cloutier was formalized on December 5, 1968, at the Commission de toponymie du Québec.

== See also ==
- List of rivers of Quebec
