= Bras-d'Apic =

Hamlet in Chaudière-Appalaches, Quebec (Canada)

- Hamlet
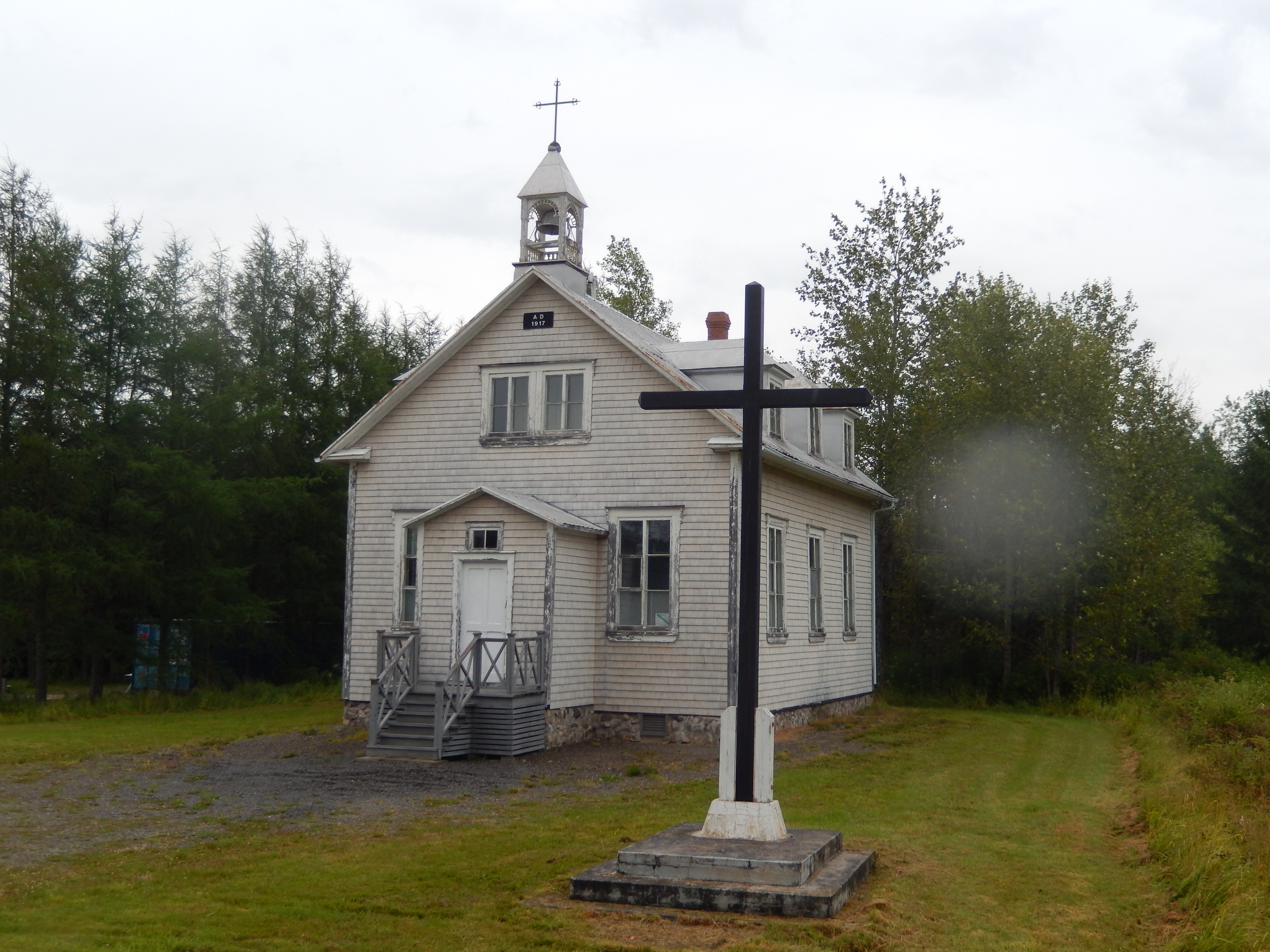
- Bras-d'Apic School-Chapel
- Interactive map of Bras-d'Apic
- Coordinates: 46.95200°N 70.17977°W
- Country: Canada
- Province: Quebec
- Region: Chaudière-Appalaches
- MRC: L'Islet Regional County Municipality
- Municipality: Saint-Cyrille-de-Lessard

Government
  - Type: Municipality
- Elevation: 372 m (1,220 ft)
- Time zone: UTC-5 (MST)
  - Summer (DST): UTC-6 (MDT)

The Bras-d'Apic is a hamlet located within the limits of the municipality of Saint-Cyrille-de-Lessard, in L'Islet Regional County Municipality, Chaudière-Appalaches, in Quebec, in Canada.

The hamlet is formed from the beginning of XXth at the intersection of Transcontinental railroad and Arago road which is then the ancestor of the current one route 285. The station and the post office both take the name of Bras-d'Apic, the name recalling Bras d'Apic which flows to the west of the hamlet.

Around 1916, a Catholic mission was opened under the patronage of Saint-Robert, the name recalls Monsignor Robert Lagueux who was the benefactor of the mission. In 1917, construction began on the school-chapel of Bras-d'Apic which is the only community building that recalls the importance of the railway center that Bras-d'Apic was in the early 1900s, it has been classified as a heritage building by the Ministry of Culture and Communications on September 30, 1982. Indeed, the hamlet had, among others, a general store, a hotel and a sawmill.

In 1925, the hamlet had a population of 123 people., today the place has a very small permanent population, it only about twenty buildings remain.

From 1967, the population decreased more and more, the post office which had been open since 1908 closed its doors. The old Bras-d'Apic station ended up losing all its usefulness when the Monk section of the Transcontinental railway was dismantled in 1986.

== Geographical location ==
To get to Bras d'Apic from Quebec, just take highway 20 eastbound to exit 400 L'Islet and continue south on route 285 beyond Saint-Cyrille-de-Lessard. From Quebec, it takes about an hour and a half to get to Bras d'Apic.
