= Tortue South-West River =

River in L'Islet in Quebec (Canada)

Tortue River South-West
- Location within Quebec
- Native name: Rivière Tortue Sud-Ouest (French)

Location
- Country: Canada
- Province: Quebec
- Region: Chaudière-Appalaches
- MRC: L'Islet Regional County Municipality, Montmagny Regional County Municipality

Physical characteristics
- Source: Agricultural stream
  - location: L'Islet
  - coordinates: 47.084533°N 70.356512°W
  - elevation: 38 metres (125 ft)
- Mouth: Tortue River
  - location: L'Islet
  - coordinates: 47.13083°N 70.33889°W
  - elevation: 18 metres (59 ft)
- Length: 10.7 kilometres (6.6 mi)

Basin features
- Tributaries
  - left: (upstream)
  - right: (upstream) Rivière du Petit Moulin

The Tortue River South-West River (in French: rivière Tortue Sud-Ouest) is a tributary of the west bank of the Tortue River, which flows on the south shore of the St. Lawrence River, east of the village of L'Islet-sur-Mer.

== Toponymy ==
The Southwest Tortue River toponym is derived from the name of the main river, the Tortue River. The use of animal names is frequent in French Canadian toponymy to designate watercourses. The term turtle usually refers to slow current due to the low drop.

The toponym Rivière Tortue Sud-Ouest was made official on December 5, 1968, at the Commission de toponymie du Québec.

== See also ==
- List of rivers of Quebec
