= Inconnue River (rivière des Perdrix tributary) =

River in Chaudière-Appalaches, Quebec (Canada)

Rivière des Perdrix
- Location within Quebec

Location
- Country: Canada
- Province: Quebec
- Region: Chaudière-Appalaches
- MRC: Montmagny Regional County Municipality

Physical characteristics
- Source: Mountain and forest streams
  - location: Cap-Saint-Ignace
  - coordinates: 46.901401°N 70.321295°W
  - elevation: 395 metres (1,296 ft)
- Mouth: Estuary of Saint Lawrence
  - location: Notre-Dame-du-Rosaire
  - coordinates: 46.90222°N 70.37639°W
  - elevation: 361 metres (1,184 ft)
- Length: 5.9 kilometres (3.7 mi)

Basin features
- Progression: rivière des Perdrix, Bras Saint-Nicolas, Rivière du Sud (Montmagny), St. Lawrence River
- Tributaries
  - left: (upstream)
  - right: (upstream)

The Inconnue River (in French: rivière Inconnue) flows in the municipalities of Cap-Saint-Ignace and Notre-Dame-du-Rosaire, in the Montmagny Regional County Municipality, in the administrative region of Chaudière-Appalaches, in Quebec, in Canada.

The "Inconnue River" is a tributary of the east bank of the rivière des Perdrix, which flows towards the south bank of the Bras Saint-Nicolas; from there, the current flows to the southeast shore of the rivière du Sud (Montmagny); the latter flows north-east to the south shore of the St. Lawrence River.

== Geography ==
The main neighboring watersheds of the Inconnue River are:

- north side: rivière des Perdrix, St. Lawrence River, Bras Saint-Nicolas;
- east side: Fortin stream, Bras Saint-Nicolas, Cloutier River;
- south side: rivière des Perdrix, Cloutier River, rivière du Sud (Montmagny), Fraser River;
- west side: rivière des Perdrix, Morigeau River.

The Inconnue River has its source on the north slope of the Notre Dame Mountains, in the township of Bourdages, in the municipality of Cap-Saint-Ignace. Several branches of mountain and forest streams feed the head of the Inconnue River.

From its source, the Inconnue River flows through mountainous and forested areas over 5.9 kilometres (3.7 mi), divided into the following segments:

- 3.1 kilometres (1.9 mi) southwesterly in Cap-Saint-Ignace, to the limit between Cap-Saint-Ignace and Notre-Dame-du-Rosaire;
- 2.8 kilometres (1.7 mi) north-west in Notre-Dame-du-Rosaire, until its confluence.

The Inconnue River flows on the east bank of the Perdrix River (Bras Saint-Nicolas) in a small valley north of the Érables mountain. This confluence is located 14.3 kilometres (8.9 mi) from the south shore of the St. Lawrence River, 8.4 kilometres (5.2 mi) north of the village of Notre-Dame-du-Rosaire and at 15.8 kilometres (9.8 mi) southeast of the Montmagny highway bridge.

== Toponymy ==
The toponym Rivière Inconnue was formalized on December 5, 1968, at the Commission de toponymie du Québec.

== See also ==
- List of rivers of Quebec
