= Morigeau River =

River in Chaudière-Appalaches, Quebec (Canada)

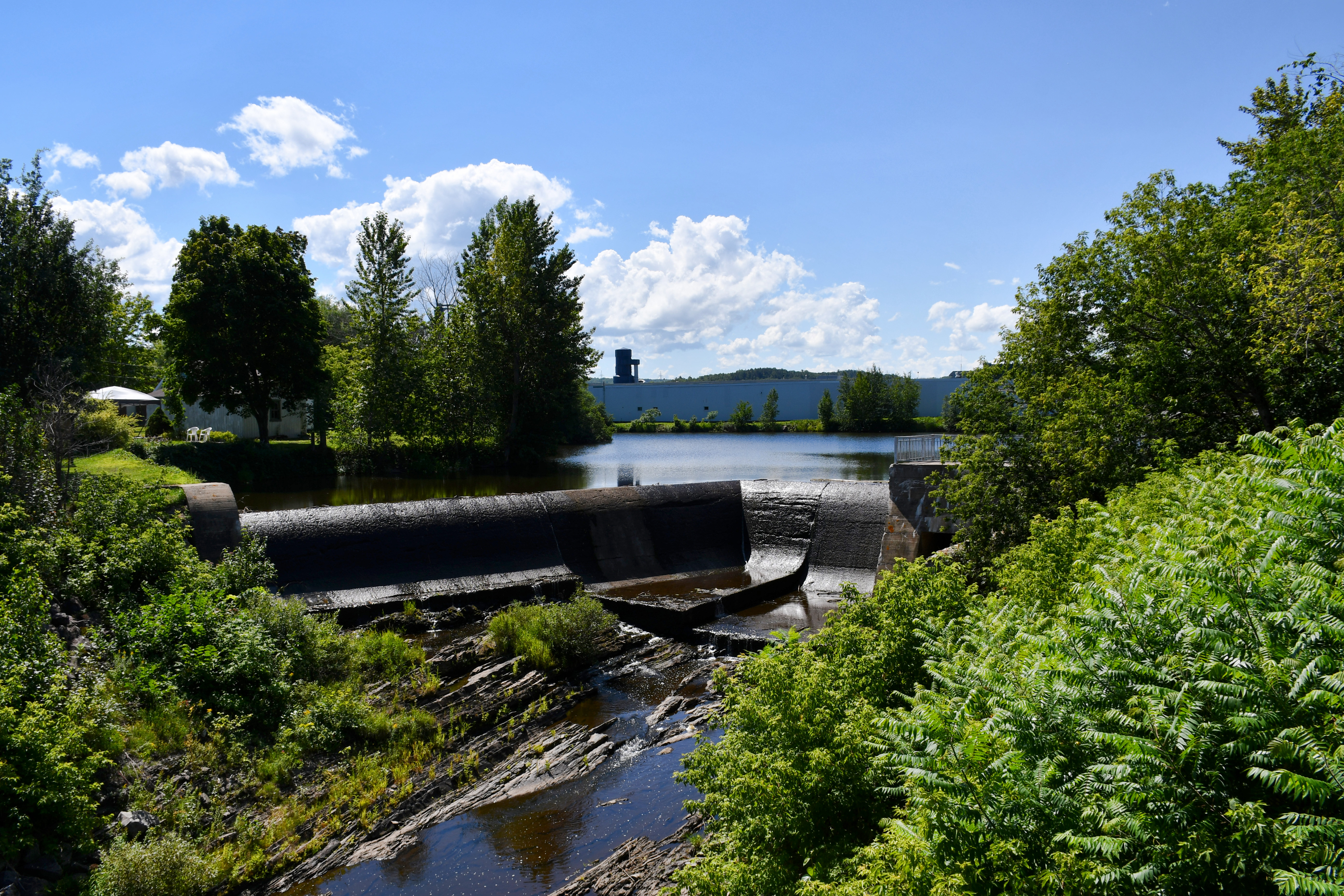
- The Morigeau river in Saint-François-de-la-Rivière-du-Sud

- Location within Quebec
- Native name: Rivière Morigeau (French)

Location
- Country: Canada
- Province: Quebec
- Region: Chaudière-Appalaches
- MRC: Montmagny Regional County Municipality

Physical characteristics
- Source: Agricultural streams
  - location: Montmagny
  - coordinates: 46.909903°N 70.478809°W
  - elevation: 290 metres (950 ft)
- Mouth: Rivière du Sud (Montmagny)
  - location: Montmagny
  - coordinates: 46.8975°N 70.67472°W
  - elevation: 13 metres (43 ft)
- Length: 23.5 kilometres (14.6 mi)

Basin features
- Progression: Rivière du Sud (Montmagny), St. Lawrence River
- Tributaries
  - left: (upstream) rivière des Poitras, ruisseau du Bédule
  - right: (upstream)

The Mongeau River (in French: rivière Morigeau) is a tributary of the south-eastern bank of the rivière du Sud (Montmagny), which flows north-east to the south shore of the St. Lawrence River.

The Morigeau river flows in the municipalities of Saint-François-de-la-Rivière-du-Sud, Saint-Pierre-de-la-Rivière-du-Sud and Montmagny, in the Montmagny Regional County Municipality, in the administrative region of Chaudière-Appalaches, in Quebec, in Canada.

== Geography ==
The main neighboring watersheds of the Morigeau river are:

- North side: Bras Saint-Nicolas, rivière du Sud (Montmagny), St. Lawrence River;
- East side: rivière des Perdrix, brook Guimont, Bras Saint-Nicolas;
- South side: rivière des Poitras;
- West side: rivière du Sud (Montmagny).

The Morigeau River originates from the northeast side of route 283, in the municipality of Montmagny, only 320 metres (1,050 ft) of the municipal boundary of Notre-Dame-du-Rosaire. Located in a forest and mountainous area, this source is 10.0 kilometres (6.2 mi) southeast of the village of Montmagny, 13.8 kilometres (8.6 mi) to the south-west of the village of Cap-Saint-Ignace and 11.2 kilometres (7.0 mi) north of the village of Notre-Dame-du-Rosaire.

The Morigeau River flows northeast, more or less parallel (on the northeast side) to the rivière du Sud (Montmagny), to the south shore of St. Lawrence River and to the rivière des Poitras.

From its source, the Morigeau river flows over 23.5 kilometres (14.6 mi), divided into the following segments:

- 6.4 kilometres (4.0 mi) westward in Montmagny, to the municipal boundary bridge of Saint-Pierre-de-la-Rivière-du-Sud;
- 2.1 kilometres (1.3 mi) west, crossing Chemin des Merisiers-Est, to Route de Saint-Pierre;
- 5.0 kilometres (3.1 mi) south-east, up to the municipal limit of Montmagny;
- 7.0 kilometres (4.3 mi) to the southwest, crossing a small lake, then to the north, crossing the chemin des Prairies-Est and the chemin de l'Aqueduc, collecting the waters of the rivière des Poitras (coming from the south), to the Morigeau path in the hamlet "Morigeau";
- 3.0 kilometres (1.9 mi) north, winding up to its confluence.

The Morigeau river empties on the south-eastern bank of the rivière du Sud (Montmagny). This confluence is located upstream of the rue Principale bridge, downstream of the Montée Saint-François bridge, and south-east of the village of Berthier-sur-Mer.

== Toponymy ==
The toponym Morigeau river was formalized on December 5, 1968, at the Commission de toponymie du Québec.

== See also ==
- List of rivers of Quebec
