= Rivière des Poitras =

River in Chaudière-Appalaches, Quebec (Canada)

- Location within Quebec

Location
- Country: Canada
- Province: Quebec
- Region: Chaudière-Appalaches
- MRC: Montmagny Regional County Municipality

Physical characteristics
- Source: Forest streams
  - location: Saint-Pierre-de-la-Rivière-du-Sud
  - coordinates: 46.879815°N 70.558415°W
  - elevation: 236 metres (774 ft)
- Mouth: Morigeau River
  - location: Saint-François-de-la-Rivière-du-Sud
  - coordinates: 46.86722°N 70.65388°W
  - elevation: 104 metres (341 ft)
- Length: 12.3 kilometres (7.6 mi)

Basin features
- Progression: Morigeau River, rivière du Sud (Montmagny), St. Lawrence River
- Tributaries
  - left: (upstream)
  - right: (upstream)

The rivière des Poitras is a tributary of the south bank of the Morigeau River which flows on the south-eastern bank of the rivière du Sud (Montmagny); the latter flows north-east to the south shore of the St. Lawrence River.

The Poitras river flows in the municipalities of Saint-Pierre-de-la-Rivière-du-Sud and Saint-François-de-la-Rivière-du-Sud, in the Montmagny Regional County Municipality, in the administrative region of Chaudière-Appalaches, in Quebec, in Canada.

== Geography ==
The main neighboring watersheds of the Poitras river are:

- north side: Morigeau River, rivière du Sud (Montmagny), Bras Saint-Nicolas, St. Lawrence River;
- east side: rivière des Perdrix, Bédule stream, Bras Saint-Nicolas;
- south side: Noire River (South River tributary), rivière du Sud (Montmagny);
- west side: rivière du Sud (Montmagny).

The Poitras river has its source near a country road, in the western part of the municipality of Saint-Pierre-de-la-Rivière-du-Sud, at 10.9 kilometres (6.8 mi) south of the village of Montmagny and 8.1 kilometres (5.0 mi) east of the hamlet of Morigeau.

From its source, the Poitras river flows in parallel, on the south side of the Morigeau River. The course of the river descends on 12.3 kilometres (7.6 mi), divided into the following segments:

- 6.1 kilometres (3.8 mi) west in Saint-Pierre-de-la-Rivière-du-Sud, up to the municipal limit of Saint-François-de-la-Rivière-du-Sud;
- 1.9 kilometres (1.2 mi) west, to a country road;
- 1.6 kilometres (0.99 mi) north-west, up to its confluence.

The Poitras river flows on the south-eastern shore of the Morigeau River. This confluence is located at 1.7 kilometres (1.1 mi) north-east of the Martineau hamlet.

== Toponymy ==
The toponym Rivière des Poitras was formalized on December 5, 1968, at the Commission de toponymie du Québec.

== See also ==
- List of rivers of Quebec
