= Inconnu =

Inconnu can mean:

- Inconnu, Stenodus nelma, a freshwater whitefish in the family Salmonidae

== Arts ==
- Inconnu Independent Art Group, an art group
- Inconnu (World of Darkness), a fictional vampire sect
- L'Inconnue de la Seine, a death mask that was perceived as an icon of female beauty in the early 20th century
- Les Inconnus, three French humorists: Didier Bourdon, Bernard Campan and Pascal Légitimus
- Bel Inconnu, an Arthurian character

== See also ==
- Inconnue River (disambiguation)
