= Méchant Pouce River =

River in Chaudière-Appalaches, Quebec (Canada)

- Location within Quebec

Location
- Country: Canada
- Province: Quebec
- Region: Chaudière-Appalaches
- MRC: Montmagny Regional County Municipality

Physical characteristics
- Source: Mountainous area of Côte-du-Sud
  - location: Saint-Marcel
  - coordinates: 46.890009°N 70.179173°W
  - elevation: 442 metres (1,450 ft)
- Mouth: rivière du Sud (Montmagny)
  - location: Sainte-Apolline-de-Patton
  - coordinates: 46.91611°N 70.25305°W
  - elevation: 361 metres (1,184 ft)
- Length: 8.1 kilometres (5.0 mi)

Basin features
- Progression: Bras Saint-Nicolas, rivière du Sud (Montmagny), St. Lawrence River
- Tributaries
  - left: (upstream)
  - right: (upstream)

The rivière Méchant Pouce (in English: Bad Tumb River) flows in the municipalities of Saint-Marcel (MRC of L'Islet Regional County Municipality) and Sainte-Apolline-de-Patton (MRC de Montmagny Regional County Municipality), in the administrative region of Chaudière-Appalaches, in Quebec, in Canada.

The confluence of the Méchant Pouce river forms the head of the Bras Saint-Nicolas which flows north-west, then south-west, to flow onto the south-east bank of the rivière du Sud (Montmagny); the latter flows north-east to the south shore of the St. Lawrence River.

== Geography ==
The main neighboring watersheds of the Méchant Pouce river are:

- north side: Bras Saint-Nicolas;
- east side: Bras d'Apic, outlet of the Lac des Roches;
- south side: Fortin stream;
- west side: Cloutier River, Fortin stream.

The Méchant Pouce river takes its source from mountain streams, north-west of Violon Lake (altitude: 426 metres (1,398 ft)), in the Notre Dame Mountains. Violon Lake straddles the townships of Arago Saint-Marcel and Patton Sainte-Apolline-de-Patton. Rather, this lake is drained by the Rocheuse River (hydrographic slope of the Great Noire River).

From its source, the Méchant Pouce river flows over 8.3 kilometres (5.2 mi), divided into the following segments:

- 0.3 kilometres (0.19 mi) west in Saint-Marcel, up to the municipal limit of Sainte-Apolline-de-Patton;
- 2.9 kilometres (1.8 mi) northwesterly, to the northern limit of the township of Patton;
- 3.7 kilometres (2.3 mi) towards the north-west, crossing an area of marshes, up to the route de l'Esperance;
- 1.4 kilometres (0.87 mi) north-west, up to its confluence.

The Méchant Pouce river flows on the south bank of Bras Saint-Nicolas which flows north-west, then south-west to flow on the south-east bank of rivière du Sud (Montmagny). The confluence of the Méchant Pouce river is located in the hamlet of L'Espérance.

== Toponymy ==
This unusual name appears on a map of the township of Bourdages, drawn up in 1876.

The toponym Rivière Méchant Pouce was made official on December 5, 1968, at the Commission de toponymie du Québec.

== List of bridges ==
Sleepers	Photo	Municipality (ies)	Year of construction	Road	Length	Bridge type	
Bridge 05062		Sainte-Apolline-de-Patton	1945	Route of Hope	14.1 metres (46 ft)	Steel-timber bridge	
Private deck		Sainte-Apolline-de-Patton		Forest road		Steel-wood bridge	
Bridge 11718		Sainte-Apolline-de-Patton		Monk section		Steel-wood bridge	-

== See also ==
- List of rivers of Quebec
