= Inconnue River =

Inconnue River may refer to:

- Inconnue River (rivière des Perdrix tributary), Chaudière-Appalaches, Quebec, Canada
- Inconnue River (Maicasagi River tributary), Nord-du-Québec, Quebec, Canada
