= Amable Bélanger =

Canadian businessman (1846–1919)

Amable Bélanger (September 8, 1846 – September 22, 1919) was an iron founder who became an industrialist and community leader.

Bélanger was born in Saint-Pierre-de-la-Rivière-du-Sud, Lower Canada, and moved his foundry to Montmagny after becoming a master founder. By 1913, he and his son had developed a company with a year-round workforce of 50 people. It sold farm implements and stoves throughout Quebec and east. The son died and the company was sold.

The senior Bélanger was dedicated to developing and improving his community. He successfully developed and marketed subdivisions in the community to municipal and personal benefit. He was involved in a number of industries and was the initial president of the local Chamber of Commerce. He was integral to Montmagny becoming the leading industrial centre in the region at the turn of the 20th century.
