= Saint-Marcel, Quebec =

Saint-Marcel
- Municipality
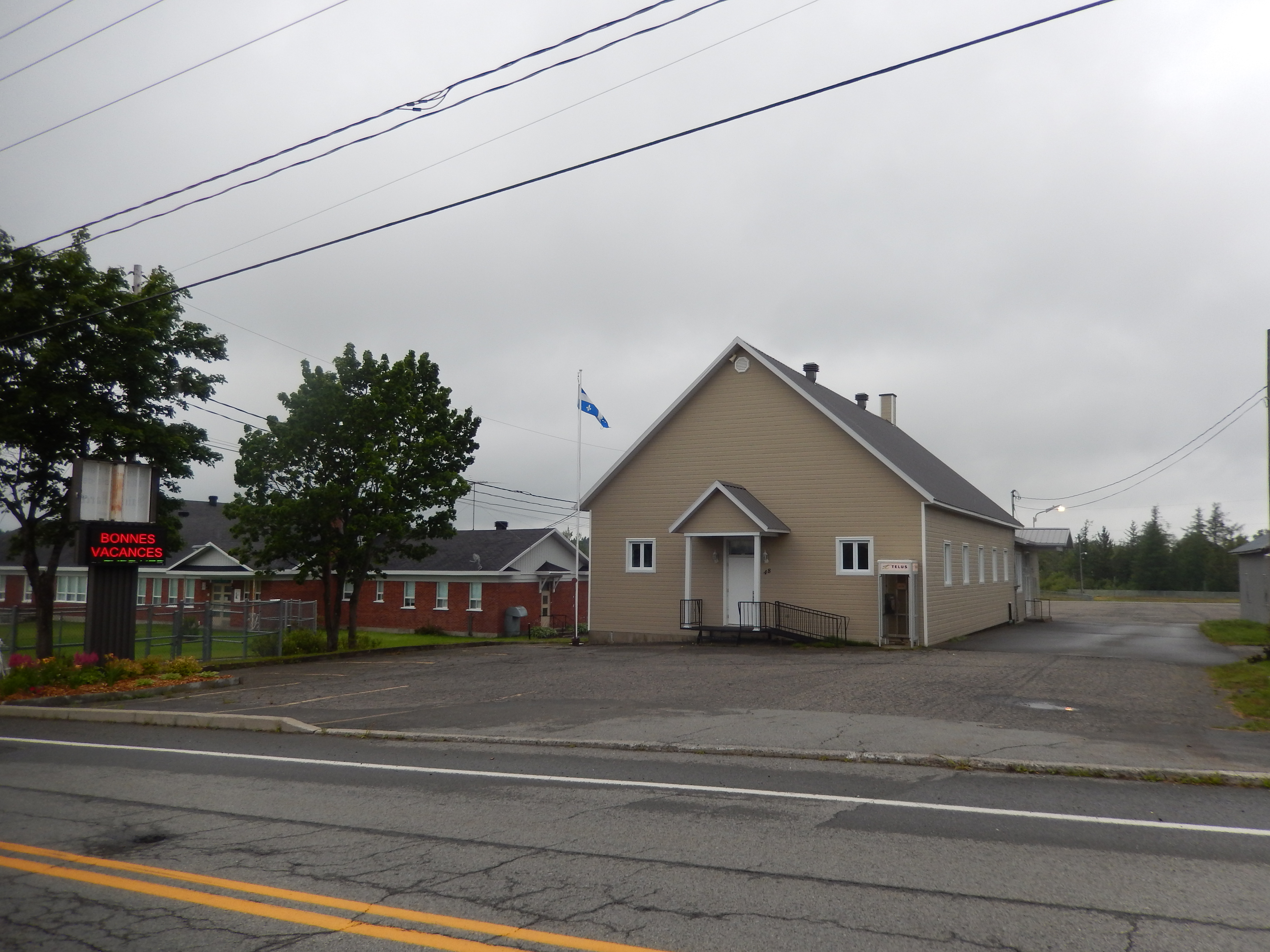

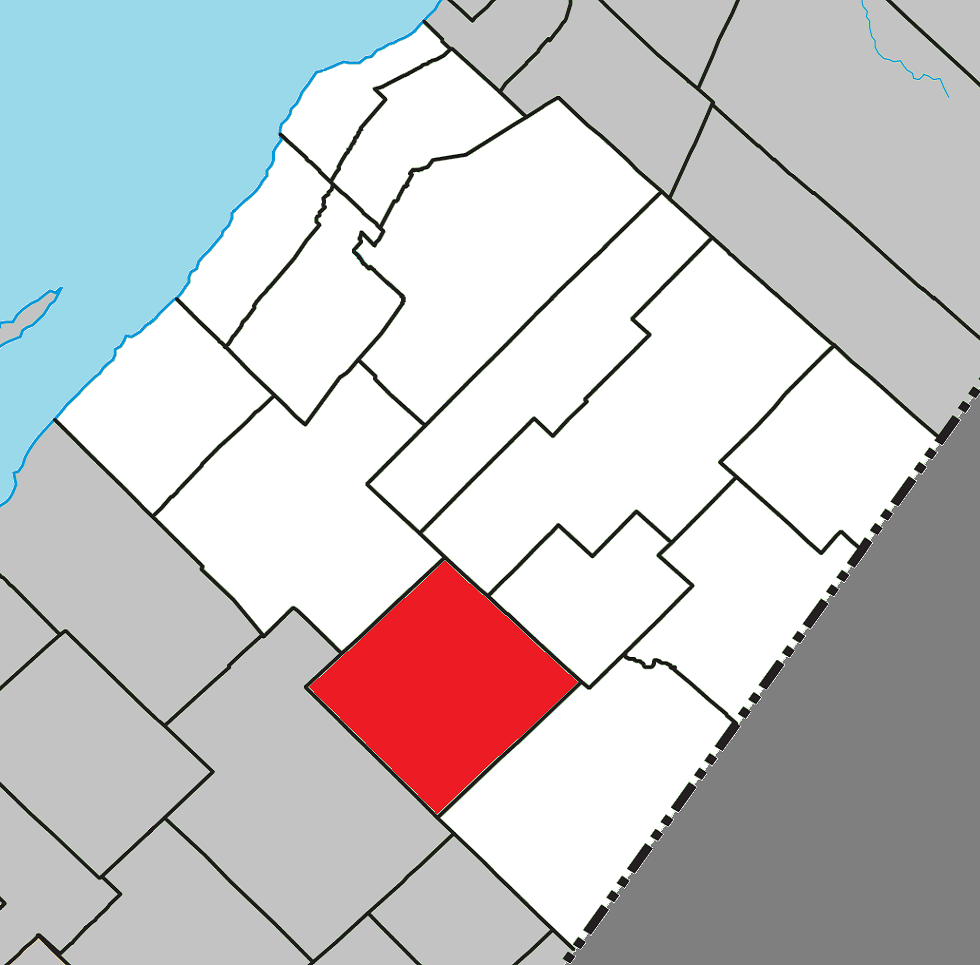
- Location within L'Islet RCM

- Location in southern Quebec
- Coordinates: 46°54′N 70°04′W
- Country: Canada
- Province: Quebec
- Region: Chaudière-Appalaches
- RCM: L'Islet
- Constituted: July 30, 1904

Government
  - Mayor: Clément Bernier
  - Federal riding: Côte-du-Sud—Rivière-du-Loup—Kataskomiq—Témiscouata
  - Prov. riding: Côte-du-Sud

Area
  - Total: 180.10 km^{2} (69.54 sq mi)
  - Land: 179.04 km^{2} (69.13 sq mi)

Population (2011)
  - Total: 428
  - Density: 2.4/km^{2} (6.2/sq mi)
  - Pop 2011-2016: ▼2.5%
- Time zone: UTC−5 (EST)
  - Summer (DST): UTC−4 (EDT)
- Postal code(s): G0R 3R0
- Area codes: 418 and 581
- Highways: R-216; R-285
- Website: www.saintmarcel.qc.ca

Saint-Marcel (French pronunciation: [sɛ̃ maʁsɛl]) is a municipality in Quebec located in the MRC de L'Islet in the Chaudière-Appalaches.

As of the 2016 census, the population of Saint-Marcel is 428.

== Geography ==
Saint-Marcel is located 130 miles from Quebec southeast of the Chaudière-Appalaches region, in the Côte-du-Sud area, on the Appalachian Plateau. Near the Canada–US border, it is halfway between Sainte-Felicite and Sainte-Apolline-de-Patton. The landscape consists of rolling hills and valleys of between 250 and 450 meters (820 and 1,480 feet). There are several rivers and lakes in the municipality, and Saint-Marcel is on the boundary of two watersheds to St. Lawrence River north and south to the border: the Grande rivière Noire, the rivière Rocheuse, and lakes Cayen, aux Canards, d'Apic and Roches et Fontaine Claire. In addition, the motocross circuit Saint-Marcel took the title of the most beautiful track in 2008 SXQC Performance GP series.

== History ==
In 1865, Township of Arago was established, which was named in honour of the French astronomer and politician François Arago (1786–1853). The Pelletier brothers, from the nearby village of St. Cyril, were the first residents. Among the first establishments in the sector was a mission established in 1882, which was recognized civilly in 1904 and canonically in 1924 as the parish of "Saint-Marcel-de-Islet." The municipality of St. Marcel was formed in 1956 under the same name. Although the exact reasons for the name of the first mission are not known, sources say it is ultimately a reference to Saint Marcel 1st, pope from 308 to 309, under the Roman Emperor Maxence. Marcellois (residents of St-Marcel) received the nickname Chapeaux de Paille (Straw Hats) as villagers of the municipality were accustomed to wearing large hats woven with straw. Between 1981 and 2001, the population of the municipality decreased by 18%, due to a declining birth rate and an aging population.

=== Timeline ===
- July 5, 1904: Creation of the municipality of the Township of Arago.
- August 18, 1956: The City of Canton d'Arago became the municipality of Saint Marcel.
- March 15, 1969: The municipality changed its name to Saint-Marcel

== Economy ==
Agriculture (especially dairy) and maple farming are the main activities of the area and surpassed logging, in addition to the presence of quarries and sand pits. To take advantage of d'Apic Lake, a resort includes an interpretive nature trail. In addition, the former parsonage has been transformed into an inn which serves gourmet meals and local produce.

== See also ==
- List of municipalities in Quebec
