= Saint-Pierre-de-la-Rivière-du-Sud =

- Parish municipality
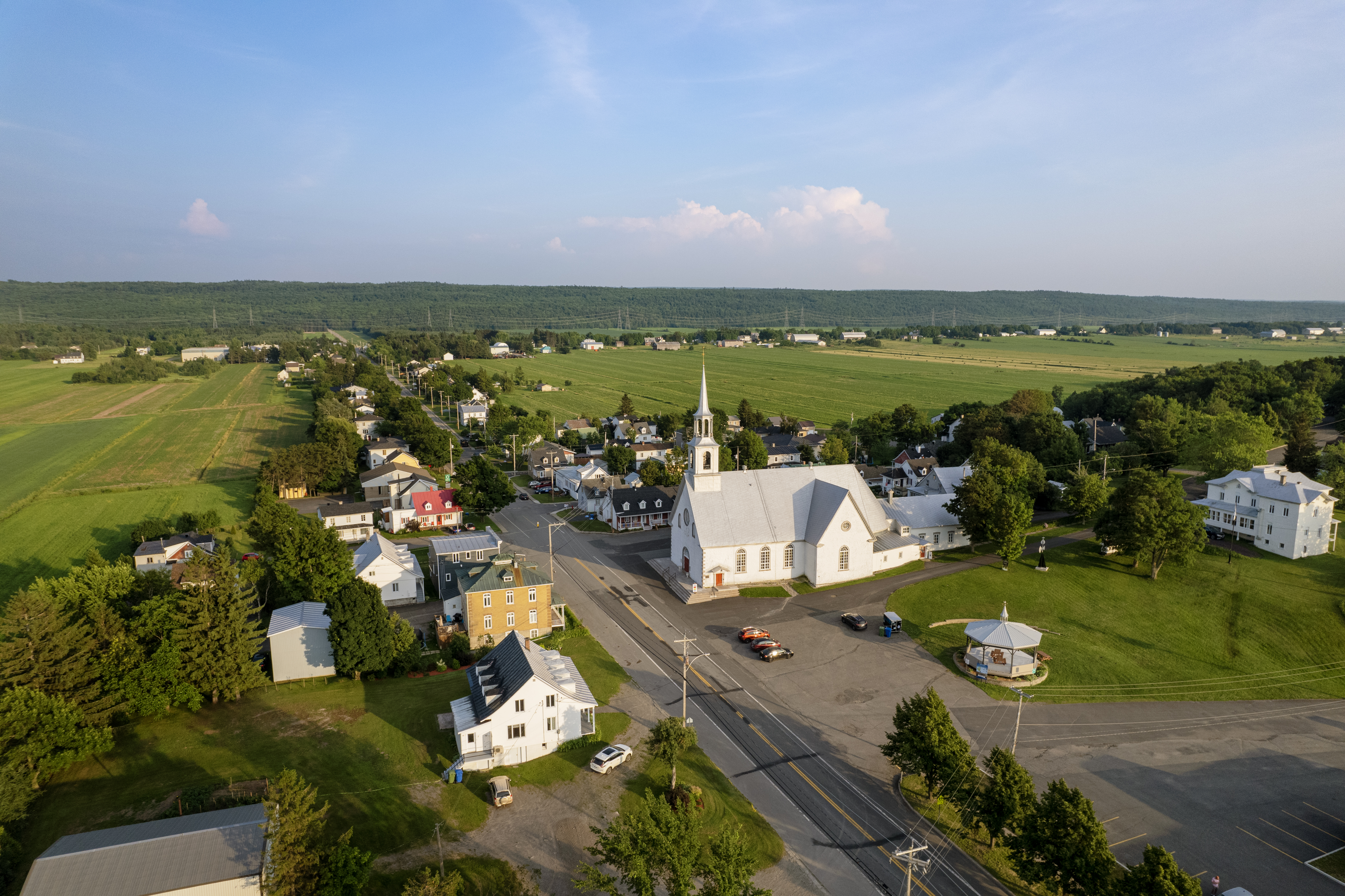

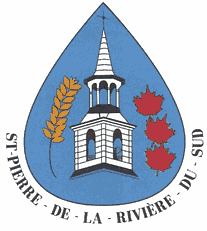
- Coat of arms

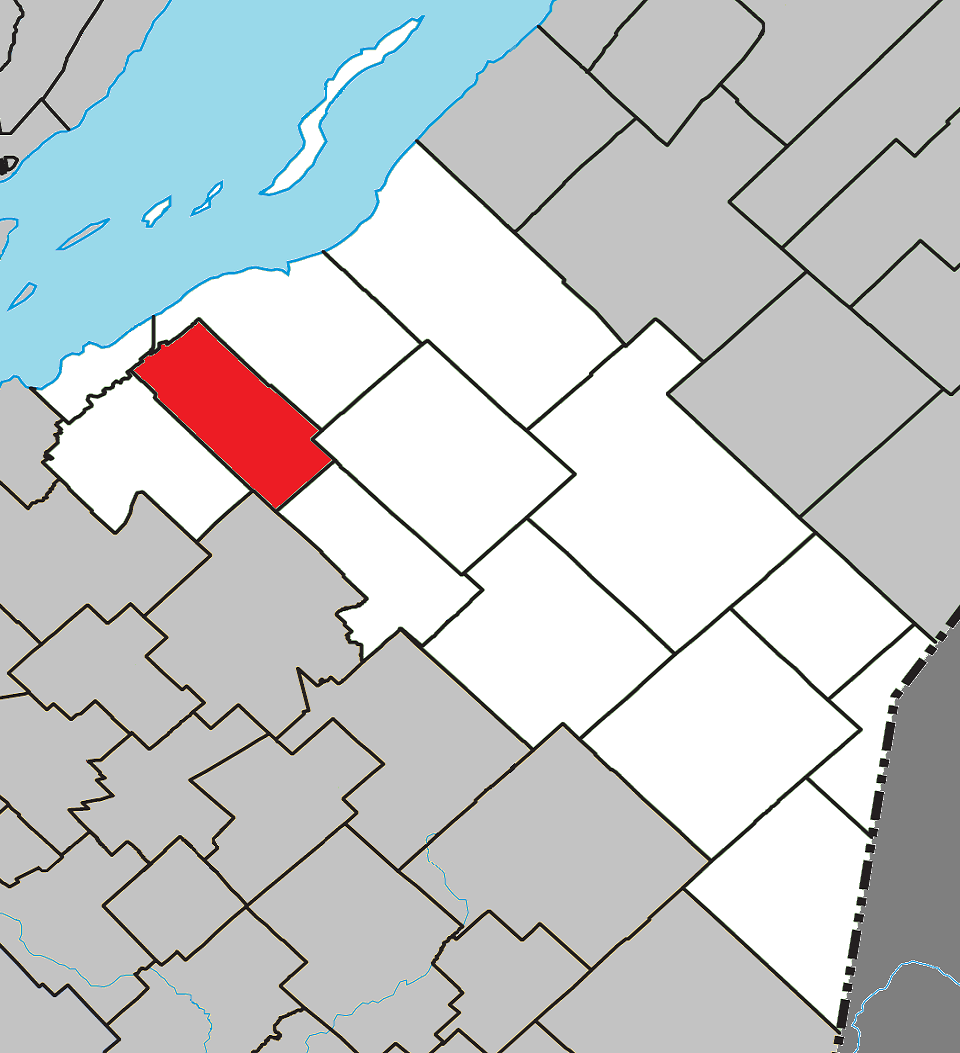
- Location within Montmagny RCM

- Location in province of Quebec
- Coordinates: 46°55′N 70°38′W
- Country: Canada
- Province: Quebec
- Region: Chaudière-Appalaches
- RCM: Montmagny
- Constituted: July 1, 1855

Government
  - Mayor: Alain Fortier
  - Fed. riding: Côte-du-Sud—Rivière-du-Loup—Kataskomiq—Témiscouata
  - Prov. riding: Côte-du-Sud

Area
  - Total: 90.92 km^{2} (35.10 sq mi)
  - Land: 91.05 km^{2} (35.15 sq mi)
- There is an apparent discrepancy between 2 authoritative sources.

Population (2021)
  - Total: 840
  - Density: 9.2/km^{2} (24/sq mi)
  - Pop 2016-2021: ▼7.4%
  - Dwellings: 430
- Time zone: UTC−5 (EST)
  - Summer (DST): UTC−4 (EDT)
- Postal code(s): G0R 4B0
- Area codes: 418 and 581
- Highways A-20 (TCH): R-228
- Website: stpierrerds.ca

Saint-Pierre-de-la-Rivière-du-Sud (French pronunciation: [sɛ̃ pjɛʁ də la ʁivjɛʁ dy syd]) is a parish municipality in Quebec, Canada.

== Demographics ==
In the 2021 Census of Population conducted by Statistics Canada, Saint-Pierre-de-la-Rivière-du-Sud had a population of 840 living in 370 of its 430 total private dwellings, a change of −7.4% from its 2016 population of 907. With a land area of 91.05 km^{2} (35.15 sq mi), it had a population density of 9.2/km^{2} (23.9/sq mi) in 2021.

== Notable people ==
- Amable Bélanger

== See also ==
- List of parish municipalities in Quebec
