= Tortue River (L'Islet) =

River in L'Islet in Quebec (Canada)

- Location within Quebec
- Native name: Rivière Tortue (French)

Location
- Country: Canada
- Province: Quebec
- Region: Chaudière-Appalaches
- MRC: L'Islet Regional County Municipality

Physical characteristics
- Source: Forest stream
  - location: Saint-Aubert
  - coordinates: 47.11974725°N 70.26402715°W
  - elevation: 144 metres (472 ft)
- Mouth: St. Lawrence River
  - location: L'Islet
  - coordinates: 47.14889°N 70.33972°W
  - elevation: 4 metres (13 ft)
- Length: 11.0 kilometres (6.8 mi)

Basin features
- Tributaries
  - left: (upstream)
  - right: (upstream)

The Tortue River (in French: rivière Tortue) is a tributary of the south shore of the St. Lawrence River where it empties east of the village of L'Islet-sur-Mer.

== Toponymy ==
The toponym Rivière Tortue was made official on December 5, 1968, at the Commission de toponymie du Québec.

== See also ==
- List of rivers of Quebec
