= Saint-Eugène, Quebec =

Saint-Eugène
- Municipality
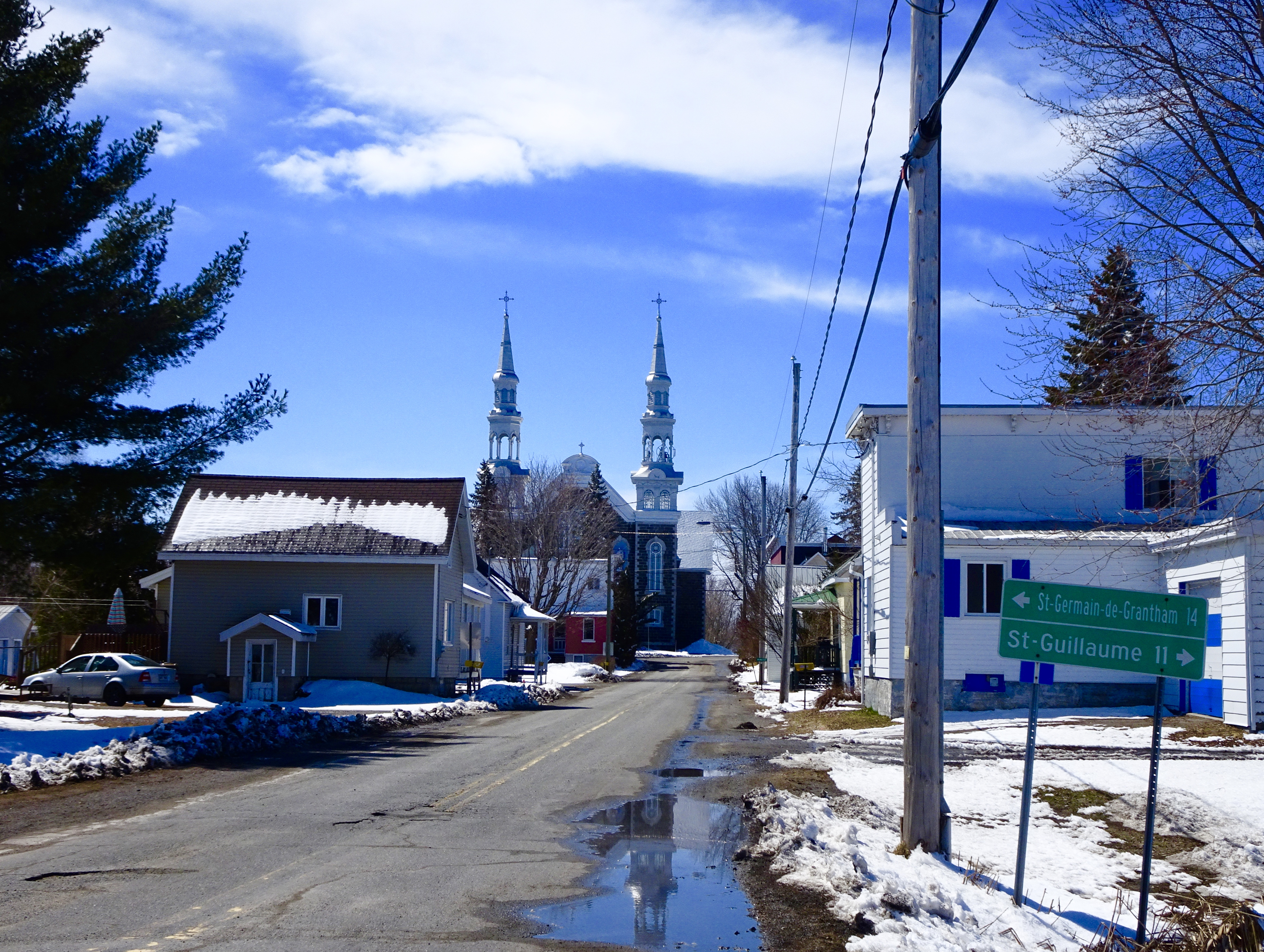
- Loisirs Road

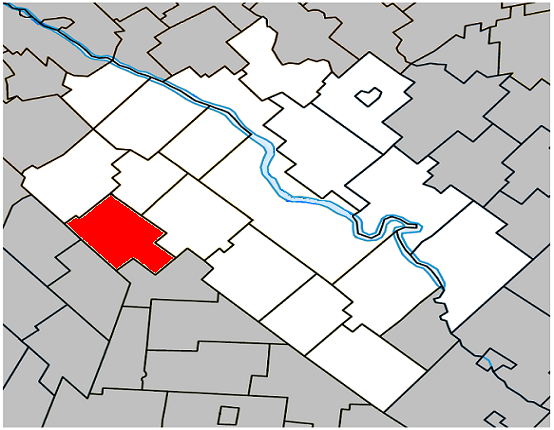
- Location within Drummond RCM.

- Location in southern Quebec.
- Coordinates: 45°48′N 72°42′W
- Country: Canada
- Province: Quebec
- Region: Centre-du-Québec
- RCM: Drummond
- Constituted: October 31, 1879

Government
  - Mayor: Gilles Beauregard
  - Federal riding: Drummond
  - Prov. riding: Marie-Lacoste-Gérin-Lajoie

Area
  - Total: 76.20 km^{2} (29.42 sq mi)
  - Land: 75.84 km^{2} (29.28 sq mi)

Population (2021)
  - Total: 1,139
  - Density: 15/km^{2} (39/sq mi)
  - Pop 2016-2021: ▲1.2%
  - Dwellings: 536
- Time zone: UTC−5 (EST)
  - Summer (DST): UTC−4 (EDT)
- Postal code(s): J0C 1J0
- Area code: 819
- Highways A-20 (TCH): R-239
- Website: www.saint-eugene.ca

Saint-Eugène (French pronunciation: [sɛ̃t‿øʒɛn]) is a municipality in the Centre-du-Québec region of Quebec. The population as of the Canada 2021 Census was 1,139.

== Demographics ==
=== Population ===
Population trend:

Census	Population	Change (%)
2021	1,139	▲1.2%
2016	1,126	▼0.4%
2011	1,131	▼0.2%
2006	1,133	▲4.5%
2001	1,084	▲2.5%
1996	1,058	▲7.7%
1991	982	▲2.8%
1986	955	▲0.2%
1981	953	▲1.6%
1976	938	▼5.8%
1971	996	▲1.4%
1966	982	▼2.1%
1961	1,003	▼1.4%
1956	1,017	▲9.6%
1951	928	▲5.8%
1941	877	▼2.6%
1931	900	▼20.7%
1921	1,135	▲1.3%
1911	1,120	▲35.9%
1901	824	▼21.4%
1891	1,049	▲101.7%
1881	520	N/A

=== Language ===
Mother tongue language (2021)

Language	Population	Pct (%)
French only	1,110	97.4%
English only	10	0.9%
Both English and French	10	0.9%
Other languages	10	0.9%

== See also ==
- List of municipalities in Quebec
