= Sainte-Apolline-de-Patton =

- Parish municipality
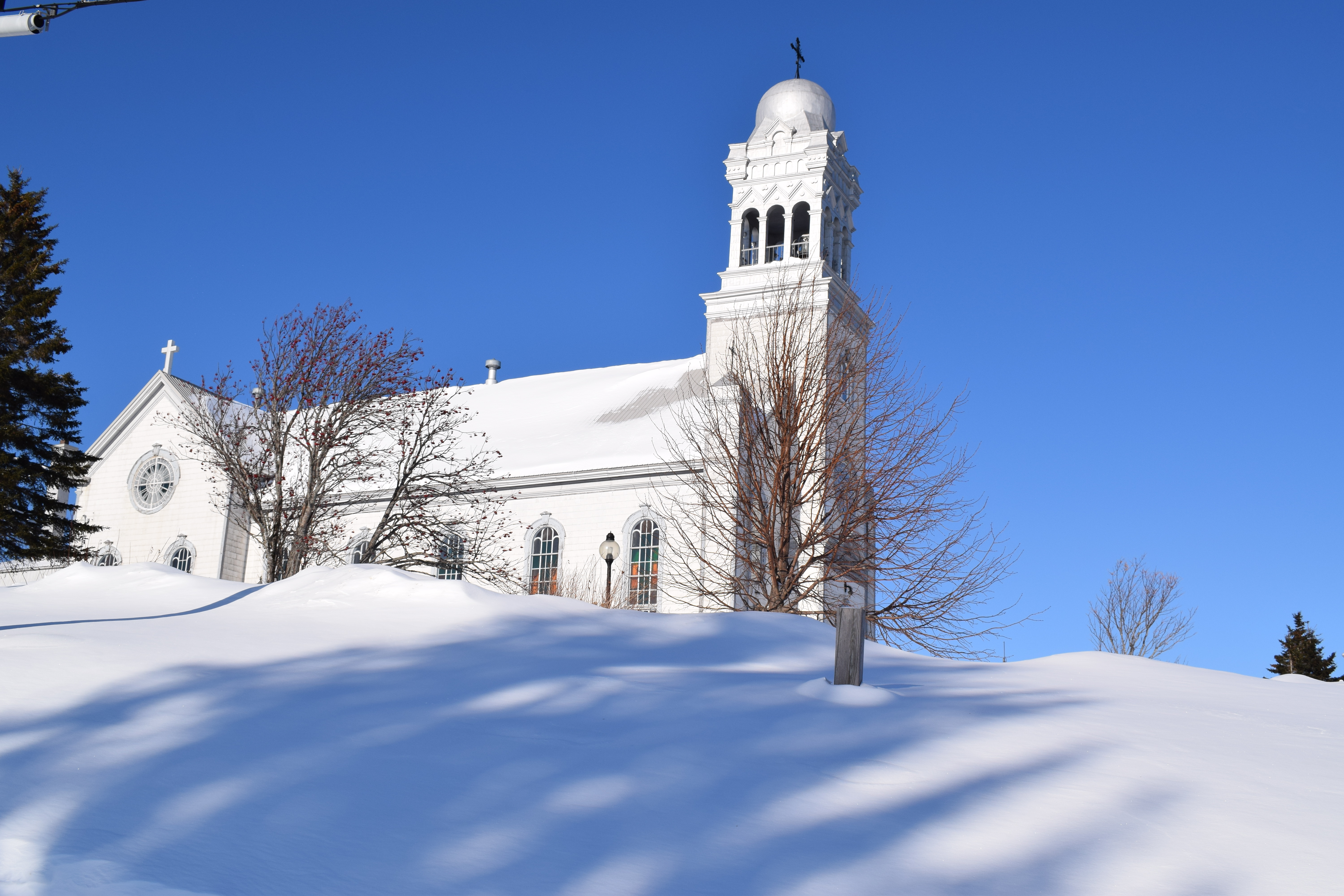

- Coat of arms

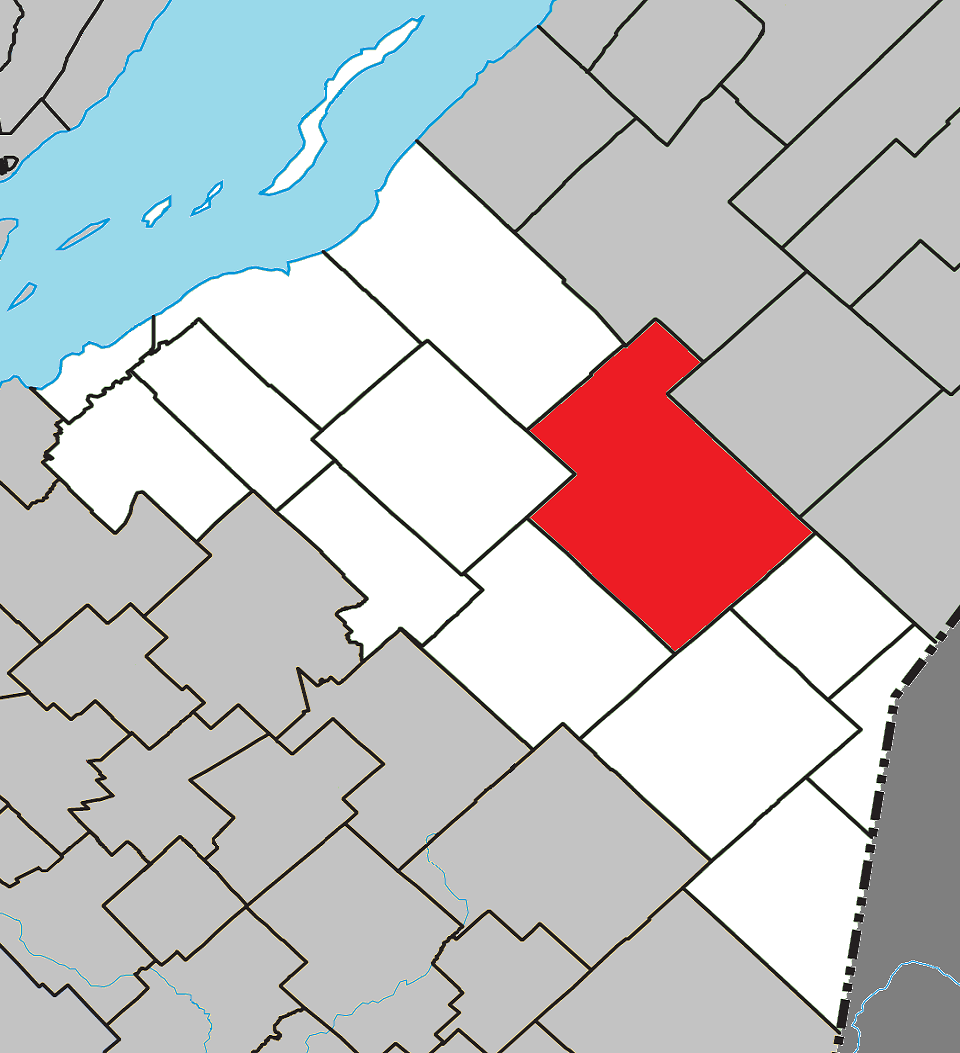
- Location within La Matapédia RCM

- Location in province of Quebec
- Coordinates: 46°48′N 70°12′W
- Country: Canada
- Province: Quebec
- Region: Chaudière-Appalaches
- RCM: Montmagny
- Constituted: December 14, 1909

Government
  - Mayor: Bruno Gagné
  - Federal riding: Côte-du-Sud—Rivière-du-Loup—Kataskomiq—Témiscouata
  - Prov. riding: Côte-du-Sud

Area
  - Total: 258.42 km^{2} (99.78 sq mi)
  - Land: 256.51 km^{2} (99.04 sq mi)

Population (2021)
  - Total: 505
  - Density: 2/km^{2} (5.2/sq mi)
  - Pop (2016-21): ▼6.8%
  - Dwellings: 423
- Time zone: UTC−5 (EST)
  - Summer (DST): UTC−4 (EDT)
- Postal code(s): G0R 2P0
- Area codes: 418 and 581
- Highways: R-216
- Website: www.sainteapolline depatton.ca

Sainte-Apolline-de-Patton is a parish municipality of about 500 people in Montmagny Regional County Municipality in the Chaudière-Appalaches region of Quebec, Canada.

== Demographics ==
In the 2021 Census of Population conducted by Statistics Canada, Sainte-Apolline-de-Patton had a population of 505 living in 257 of its 423 total private dwellings, a change of −6.8% from its 2016 population of 542. With a land area of 256.51 km^{2} (99.04 sq mi), it had a population density of 2.0/km^{2} (5.1/sq mi) in 2021.

== See also ==
- L'Islet Regional County Municipality
- Big Black River (Saint John River), a river
- List of parish municipalities in Quebec
