= Quebec Route 285 =

Highway in Quebec, Canada

Route 285

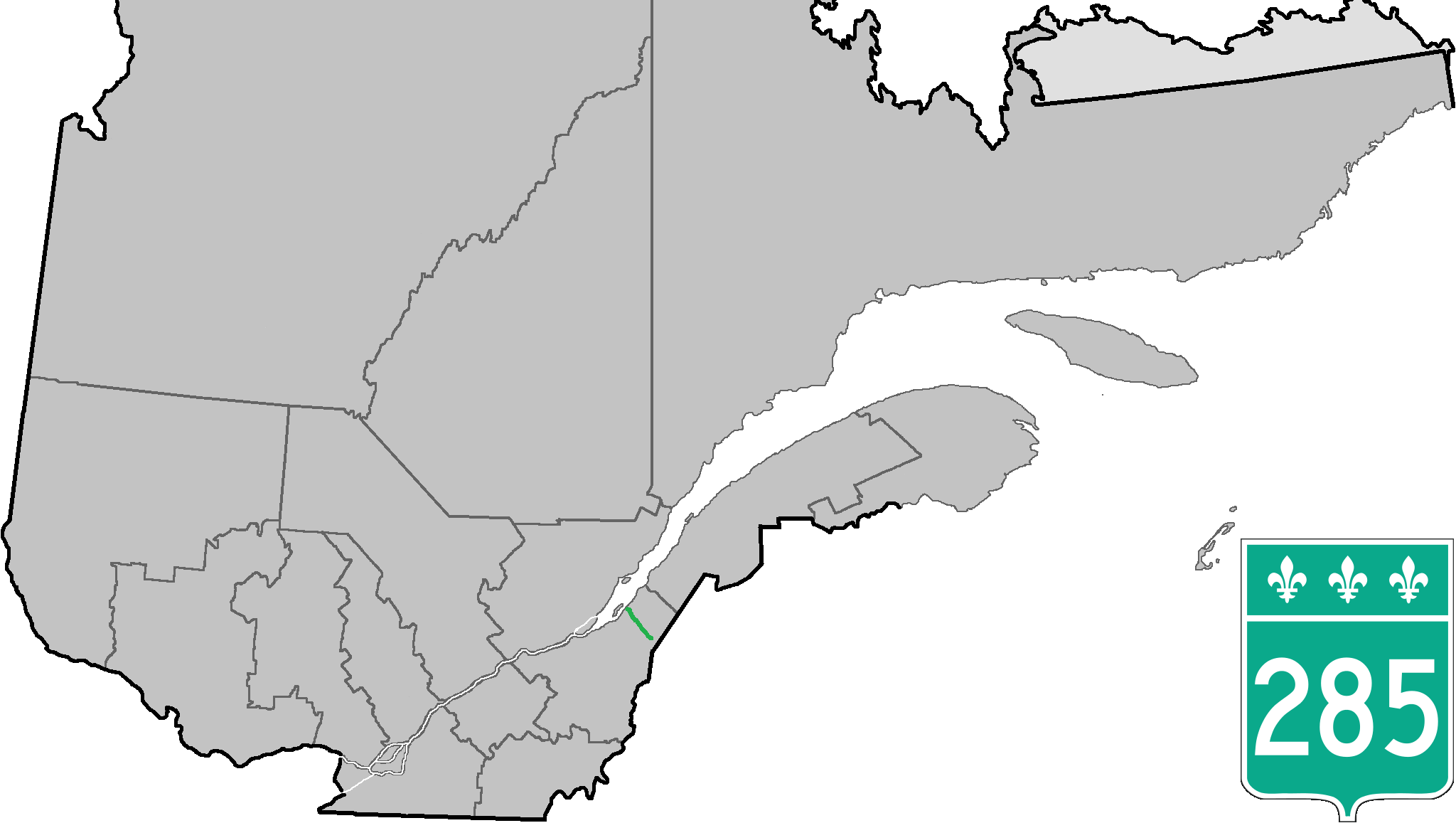

Route information
- Length: 48 km (30 mi)

Major junctions
- South end: R-204 in Saint-Adalbert
- North end: R-132 in L'Islet

Location
- Country: Canada
- Province: Quebec
- Major cities: L'Islet

Highway system
- Quebec provincial highways; Autoroutes; List; Former
← R-283	→ R-287

Route 285 is a 48 km two-lane north/south highway on the south shore of the Saint Lawrence River in the Chaudière-Appalaches region of Quebec, Canada. Its northern terminus is in L'Islet at the junction of Route 132 and the southern terminus is close to Saint-Adalbert at the junction of Route 204.

== Towns along Route 285 ==
- Saint-Adalbert
- Saint-Marcel
- Saint-Cyrille-de-Lessard
- L'Islet
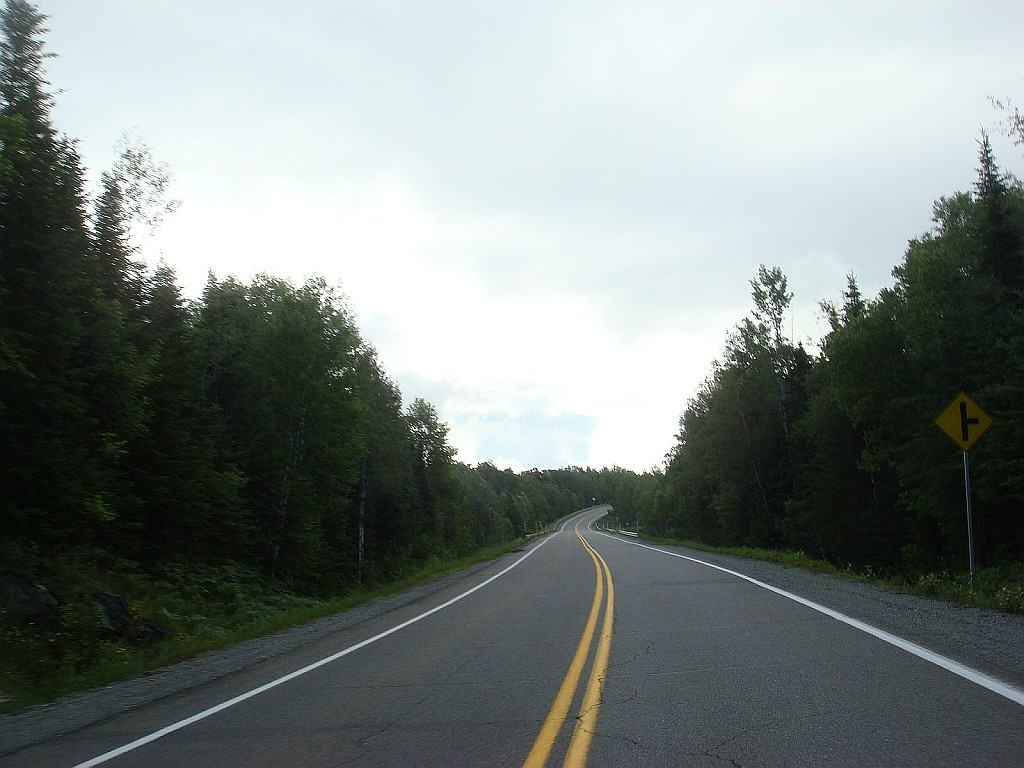
Quebec Route 285 near Saint-Adalbert.

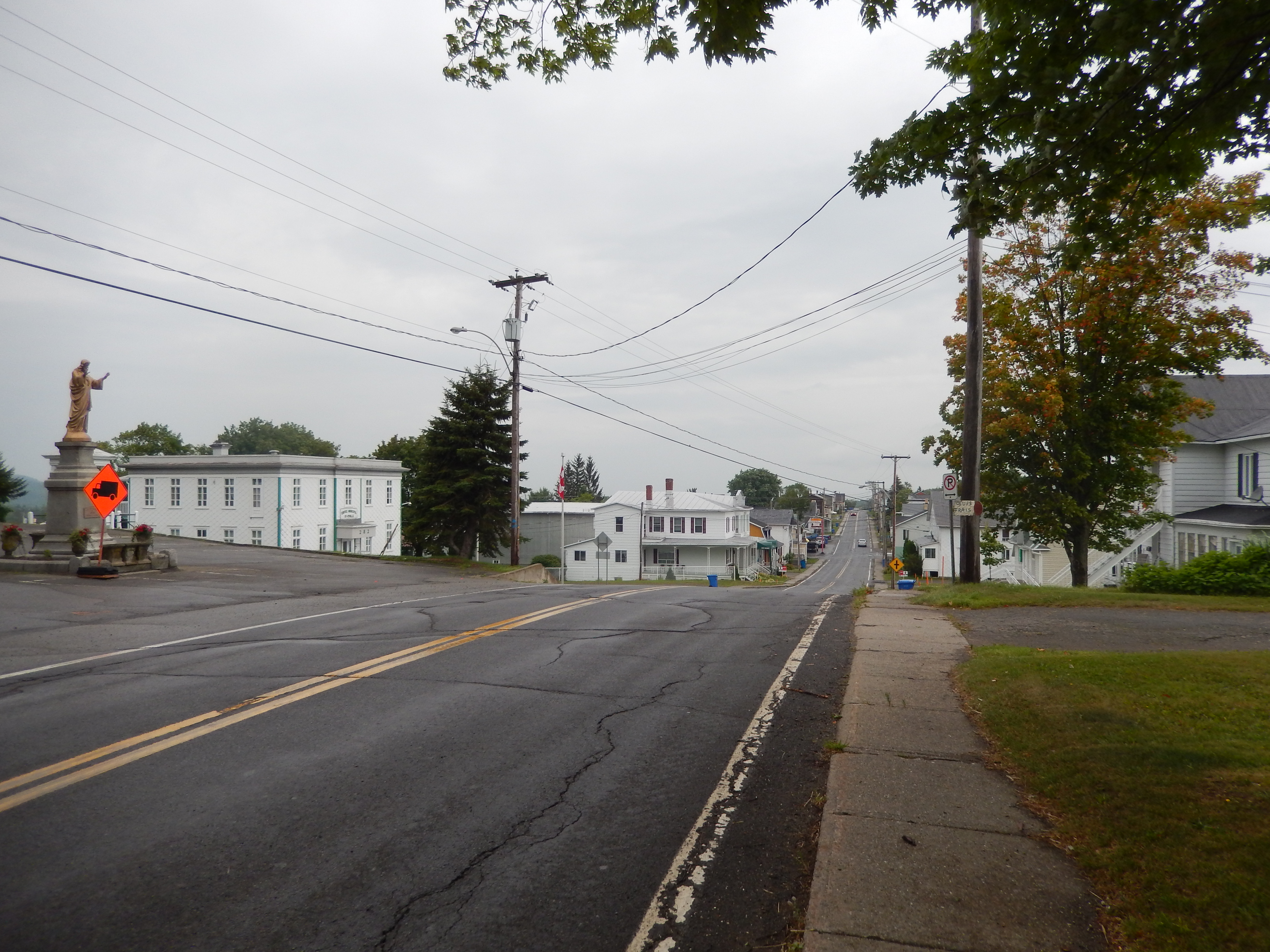
Route 285 in Saint-Cyrille-de-Lessard.

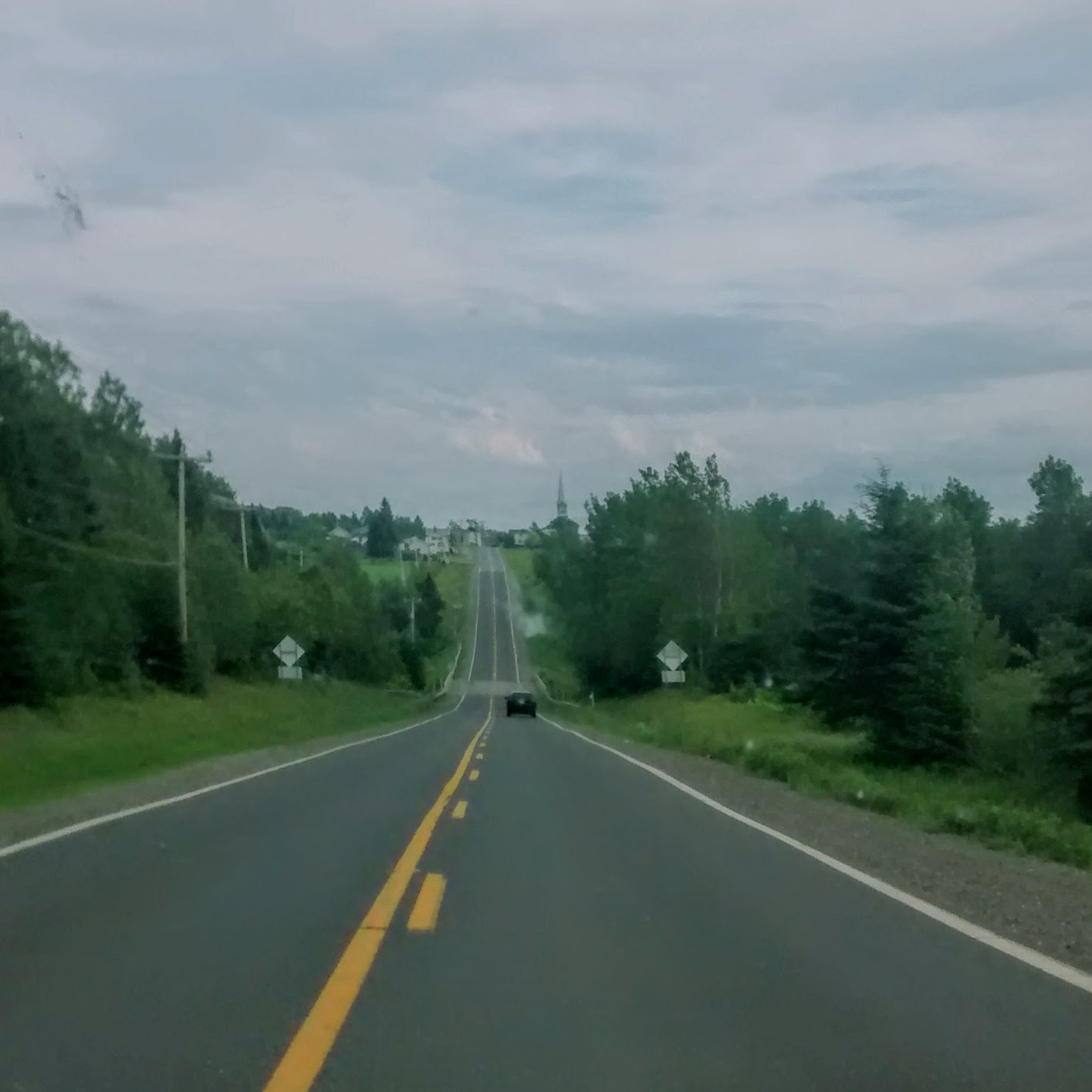
Route 285 south of Saint-Cyrille.

== See also ==
- List of Quebec provincial highways
