= Rivière des Perdrix =

River in Chaudière-Appalaches, Quebec (Canada)

- Location within Quebec

Location
- Country: Canada
- Province: Quebec
- Region: Chaudière-Appalaches
- MRC: Montmagny Regional County Municipality

Physical characteristics
- Source: Mountain and forest streams
  - location: Notre-Dame-du-Rosaire
  - coordinates: 46.864216°N 70.404992°W
  - elevation: 408 metres (1,339 ft)
- Mouth: Bras Saint-Nicolas
  - location: Montmagny
  - coordinates: 46.98583°N 70.51694°W
  - elevation: 10 metres (33 ft)
- Length: 32.3 kilometres (20.1 mi)

Basin features
- Progression: Bras Saint-Nicolas, Rivière du Sud (Montmagny), St. Lawrence River
- Tributaries
  - left: (upstream) ruisseau des Prairies
  - right: (upstream) cours d'eau Gagné, Rivière Inconnue (rivière des Perdrix)

The rivière des Perdrix flows in the municipalities of Notre-Dame-du-Rosaire, Cap-Saint-Ignace and Montmagny, in the Montmagny Regional County Municipality, in the administrative region of Chaudière-Appalaches, in Quebec, in Canada.

The Rivière des Perdrix is a tributary of the south bank of the Bras Saint-Nicolas, which flows on the southeast bank of the rivière du Sud (Montmagny); the latter flows north-east to the south shore of the St. Lawrence River.

== Geography ==
The main neighboring watersheds of the Perdrix river are:

- north side: St. Lawrence River, Bras Saint-Nicolas;
- east side: Guimont stream, Bras Saint-Nicolas, Inconnue River;
- south side: rivière du Sud (Montmagny), Fraser River, Alick River;
- west side: rivière du Sud (Montmagny), Bras Saint-Nicolas.

The Perdrix River has its source on the northern slope of the "Maple Mountain", on the northern slope of the Notre Dame Mountains, in the municipality of Notre-Dame-du-Rosaire. Several branches of mountain and forest streams feed the head of the Perdrix River.

From its source, the Perdrix River flows over 32.3 kilometres (20.1 mi), divided into the following segments:

- 3.3 kilometres (2.1 mi) north-east in Notre-Dame-du-Rosaire, to the confluence of a stream branch (coming from the south);
- 5.9 kilometres (3.7 mi) northward, up to the confluence of the Inconnue River (coming from the south-east);
- 0.8 kilometres (0.50 mi) north, to the limit between Notre-Dame-du-Rosaire and Cap-Saint-Ignace;
- 13.2 kilometres (8.2 mi) north, up to Chemin des Érables-Ouest;
- 5.6 kilometres (3.5 mi) west, crossing the route des Pommiers, to Chemin Bellevue-Ouest;
- 1.3 kilometres (0.81 mi) west, to the limit between Cap-Saint-Ignace and Montmagny;
- 1.9 kilometres (1.2 mi) west, to highway 20;
- 0.3 kilometres (0.19 mi) north, up to its confluence.

Rivière des Perdrix flows on the south shore of Bras Saint-Nicolas. This confluence is located 1.6 kilometres (0.99 mi) from the south shore of St. Lawrence River, at 1.3 kilometres (0.81 mi) downstream of the limit between Cap-Saint-Ignace and Montmagny, as well as 3.1 kilometres (1.9 mi) upstream of the railway bridge that crosses the town of Montmagny.

== Toponymy ==
The toponym Rivière des Perdrix was formalized on December 5, 1968, at the Commission de toponymie du Québec.

== See also ==
- List of rivers of Quebec
