= Saint-Cyrille-de-Lessard =

- Parish municipality
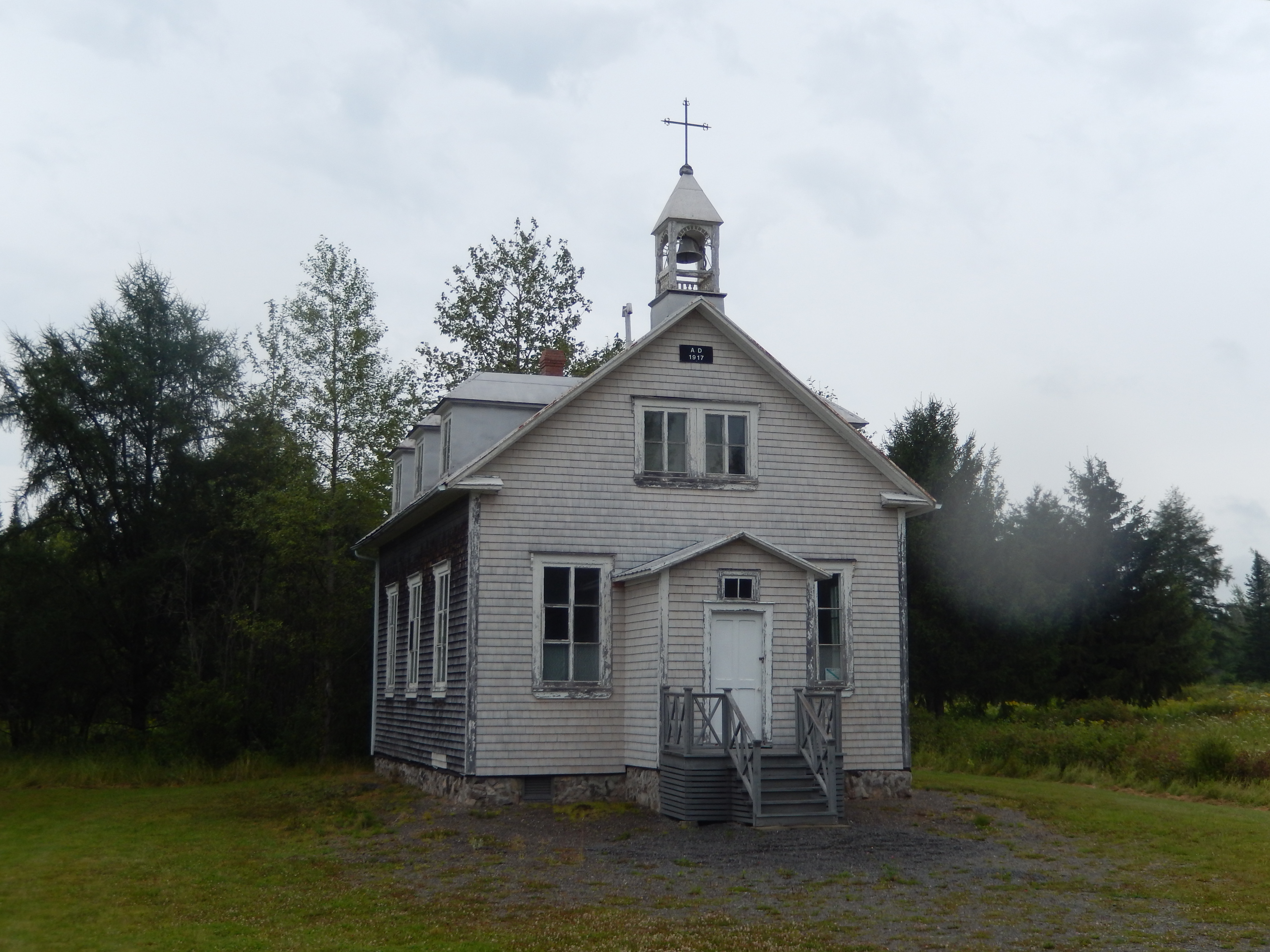

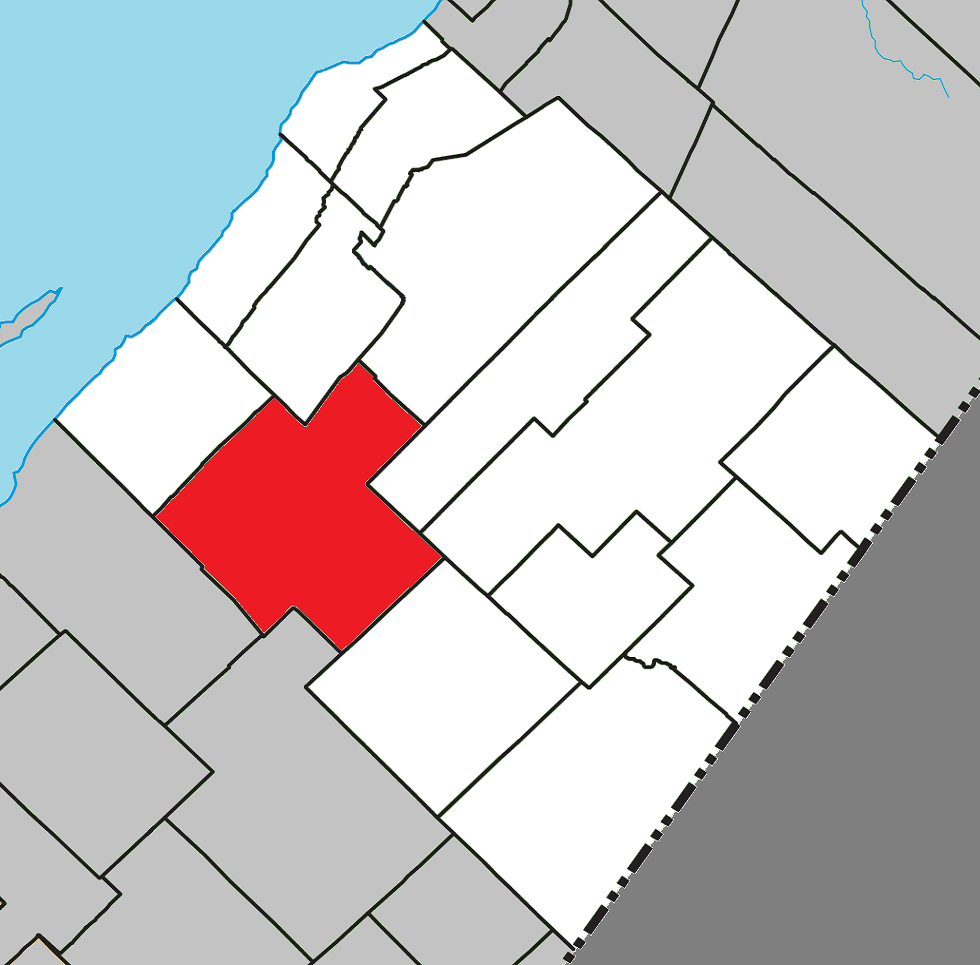
- Location within L'Islet RCM

- Location in southern Quebec
- Coordinates: 47°02′N 70°17′W
- Country: Canada
- Province: Quebec
- Region: Chaudière-Appalaches
- RCM: L'Islet
- Constituted: July 1, 1855

Government
  - Mayor: Luc Caron
  - Federal riding: Côte-du-Sud—Rivière-du-Loup—Kataskomiq—Témiscouata
  - Prov. riding: Côte-du-Sud

Area
  - Total: 231.40 km^{2} (89.34 sq mi)
  - Land: 229.72 km^{2} (88.70 sq mi)

Population (2011)
  - Total: 753
  - Density: 3.3/km^{2} (8.5/sq mi)
  - Pop 2006-2011: ▼3.2%
  - Dwellings: 548
- Time zone: UTC−5 (EST)
  - Summer (DST): UTC−4 (EDT)
- Postal code(s): G0R 2W0
- Area codes: 418 and 581
- Highways: R-285
- Website: www.st-cyrille -de-lessard.ca

Saint-Cyrille-de-Lessard (French pronunciation: [sɛ̃ siʁil də lɛsaʁ]) is a parish municipality in Quebec, Canada.

== Demographics ==
In the 2021 Census of Population conducted by Statistics Canada, Saint-Cyrille-de-Lessard had a population of 742 living in 385 of its 559 total private dwellings, a change of 3.3% from its 2016 population of 718. With a land area of 230.52 km^{2} (89.00 sq mi), it had a population density of 3.2/km^{2} (8.3/sq mi) in 2021.

== See also ==
- List of municipalities in Quebec
