= Cap-Saint-Ignace =

- Municipality
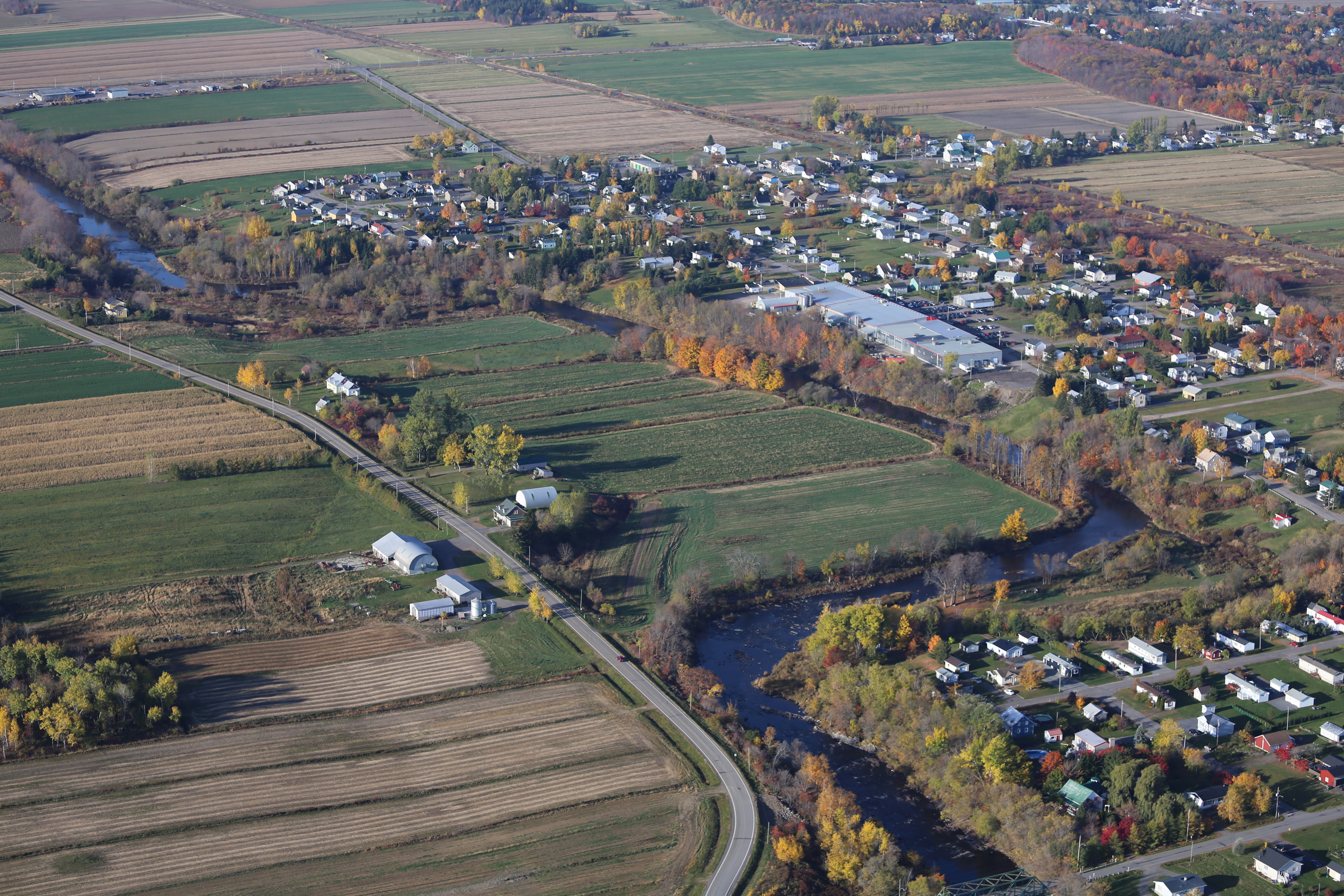

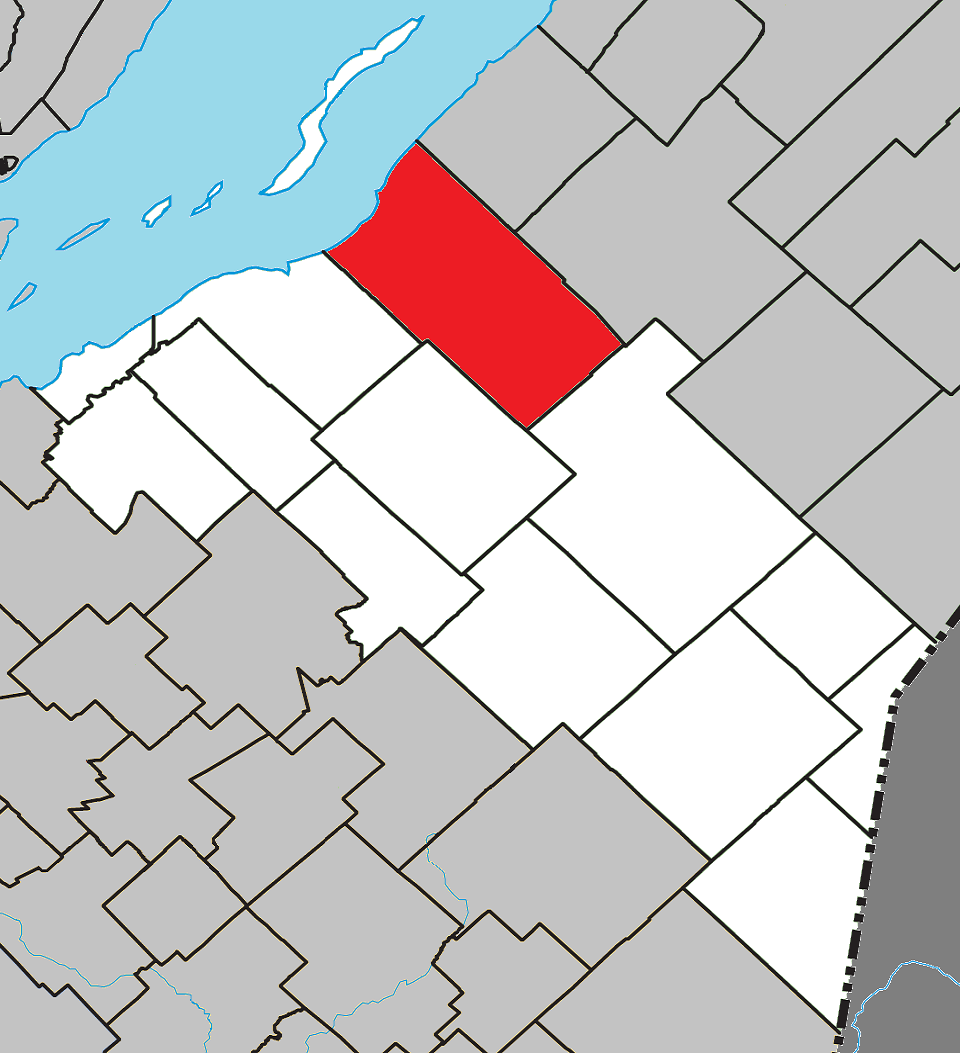
- Location within Montmagny RCM

- Location in province of Quebec
- Coordinates: 47°02′N 70°28′W
- Country: Canada
- Province: Quebec
- Region: Chaudière-Appalaches
- RCM: Montmagny
- Constituted: July 1, 1855

Government
  - Mayor: Jocelyne Caron
  - Federal riding: Côte-du-Sud—Rivière-du-Loup—Kataskomiq—Témiscouata
  - Prov. riding: Côte-du-Sud

Area
  - Total: 205.3 km^{2} (79.3 sq mi)
  - Land: 204.32 km^{2} (78.89 sq mi)

Population (2021)
  - Total: 3,099
  - Density: 15.2/km^{2} (39/sq mi)
  - Pop (2016-21): ▲0.3%
  - Dwellings: 1,521
- Time zone: UTC−5 (EST)
  - Summer (DST): UTC−4 (EDT)
- Postal code(s): G0R 1H0
- Area codes: 418 and 581
- Highways A-20 (TCH): R-132
- Website: www.capsaintignace.ca

Cap-Saint-Ignace (French pronunciation: [kap sɛ̃t‿iɲas]) is a municipality in the Montmagny Regional County Municipality within the Chaudière-Appalaches region of Quebec, Canada. It is located on the south shore of the St. Lawrence River, 70 kilometres (43 mi) east of Quebec City on Route 132.

== Geography ==
Cap-Saint-Ignace is located on the scenic chemin des Pionniers Ouest, also known as Highway 132, at the Junction of the route du Petit-Cap which is accessible from provincial Autoroute 20, the Autoroute Jean-Lesage. The town's total area is 227 square kilometres (88 sq mi) and borders the scenic St. Lawrence River with access to the river and migratory bird sanctuaries.

== Demographics ==
Historical census populations – Cap-Saint-Ignace

Year	Pop.	±%
1871	3,278	—
1881	3,889	+18.6%
1891	3,539	−9.0%
1901	3,519	−0.6%
1911	3,648	+3.7%
1921	3,190	−12.6%
1931	2,881	−9.7%
1941	2,643	−8.3%

Year	Pop.	±%
1951	2,725	+3.1%
1956	2,661	−2.3%
1961	2,691	+1.1%
1966	2,792	+3.8%
1971	2,984	+6.9%
1976	3,086	+3.4%
1981	3,274	+6.1%
1986	3,207	−2.0%

Year	Pop.	±%
1991	2,990	−6.8%
1996	3,078	+2.9%
2001	3,204	+4.1%
2006	3,204	+0.0%
2011	3,045	−5.0%
2016	3,089	+1.4%
2021	3,099	+0.3%

Source: Statistics Canada

== Motto and emblems ==
The town's motto, Mets le cap sur la vaillance, translates as "Vigilance is your bearing" and provides the people of Cap-Saint-Ignace with the popular nickname of "les Vaillants".

Named after its protector, Saint Ignatius of Loyola, the town's emblems are the native blue flax and the eastern bluebird. The blue flax, native to the countryside, is attributed many qualities both as clothing linen and for its medicinal properties. The eastern bluebird frequents the local orchards, farms, hedgerows and rock dikes in the area and is renowned for its songbird qualities.

== Local attractions ==
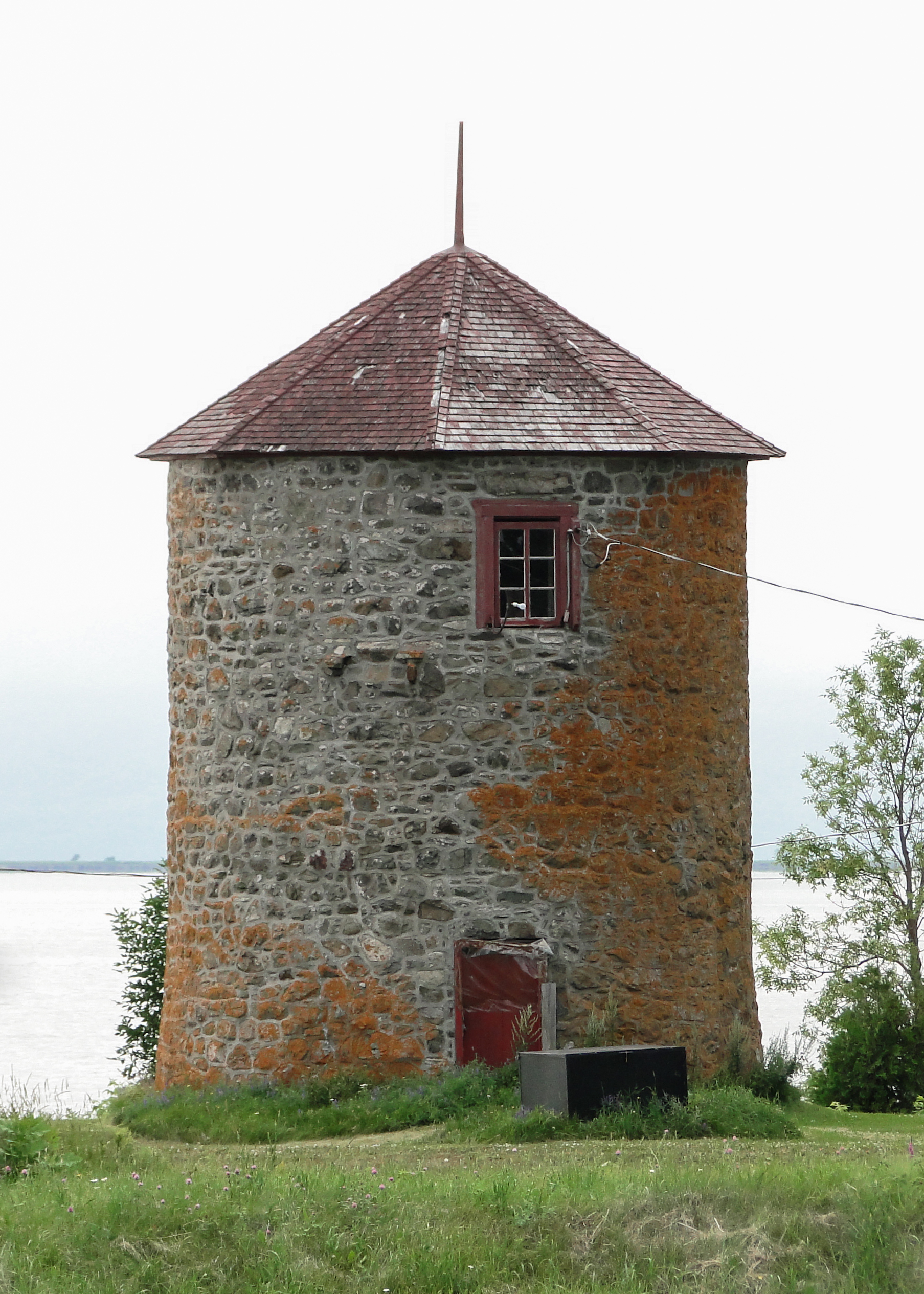
Vincelotte Windmill (1690)

The Petit-Cap ("Little Cape") and the ancient government pier are amongst the local attractions (parking on-site but foot-access only). The area is dotted with trails, observations posts and rest areas with interpretive panels on the local fauna, flora and the areas' rich and colourful history. The fall migration of snow geese, amongst other species, is most spectacular.

For cyclists, the chemin des Pionniers Ouest provides countless hours of scenic riding. Locally, there are four main cycle circuits: Route Verte or Green circuit follows the River through the Town; the Route des pommes or Apple circuit (11 km) takes cyclists by the orchards; the Campagnard or Country trek (21 km) brings cyclists through the local maple sugar and produce areas; and the Seigneurial trek (14.7 km) takes cyclists to and near the historical landmarks. Many of these are natural and preserved sites, pleasant to view and enjoy, but travellers are requested to respect private property. Cycling circuits include rest areas and places where travellers can purchase meals, snacks, refreshments and souvenirs.

There are many events throughout the year in Cap-Saint-Ignace. Not the least is the Feast of the Saint-Hubert (1–3 Sep) held in honour of the Saint and patron of hunters, complete with a procession and solemn mass to the sound of French horns accompanying the great organ pipes, meal, clay pigeon shoot, equestrian demonstrations and other activities related to the hunt.

== Notable natives ==
- Léo-Pol Morin, pianist, music critic, and composer

== See also ==
- List of municipalities in Quebec
