= L'Islet Regional County Municipality =

Location in Quebec, Canada

L'Islet
- Regional county municipality
- Coordinates: 47°06′N 69°59′W
- Country: Canada
- Province: Quebec
- Region: Chaudière-Appalaches
- Effective: January 1, 1982
- County seat: Saint-Jean-Port-Joli

Government
  - Type: Prefecture
  - Prefect: Réal Laverdière

Area
  - Total: 2,448.50 km^{2} (945.37 sq mi)
  - Land: 2,100.02 km^{2} (810.82 sq mi)

Population (2016)
  - Total: 17,798
  - Density: 8.5/km^{2} (22/sq mi)
  - Change 2011-2016: ▼3.9%
  - Dwellings: 9,924
- Time zone: UTC−5 (EST)
  - Summer (DST): UTC−4 (EDT)
- Area codes: 418 and 581
- Website: www.mrclislet.com

L'Islet (French pronunciation: [lilɛ]) is a regional county municipality in the Chaudière-Appalaches region of Quebec, Canada.

The county seat is Saint-Jean-Port-Joli.

== Geography ==
=== Adjacent counties and municipalities ===
- Kamouraska Regional County Municipality – northeast
- Aroostook County, Maine – southeast
- Montmagny Regional County Municipality – southwest
- Charlevoix Regional County Municipality – northwest

== Subdivisions ==
There are 14 subdivisions within the RCM:

Cities & Towns (1)

- Saint-Pamphile

Municipalities (11)

- L'Islet
- Saint-Adalbert
- Saint-Aubert
- Saint-Damase-de-L'Islet
- Sainte-Félicité
- Sainte-Perpétue
- Saint-Jean-Port-Joli
- Saint-Marcel
- Saint-Omer
- Saint-Roch-des-Aulnaies
- Tourville

Parishes (2)

- Saint-Cyrille-de-Lessard
- Sainte-Louise

== Transportation ==
=== Access Routes ===
Highways and numbered routes that run through the municipality, including external routes that start or finish at the county border:

- Autoroutes
  - A-20 (TCH)
- Principal Highways
  - R-132
- Secondary Highways
  - R-204
  - R-216
  - R-285
- External Routes
  - None

== See also ==
- List of regional county municipalities and equivalent territories in Quebec
