= Ouelle River =

River in L'Islet and Kamouraska in Quebec (Canada)

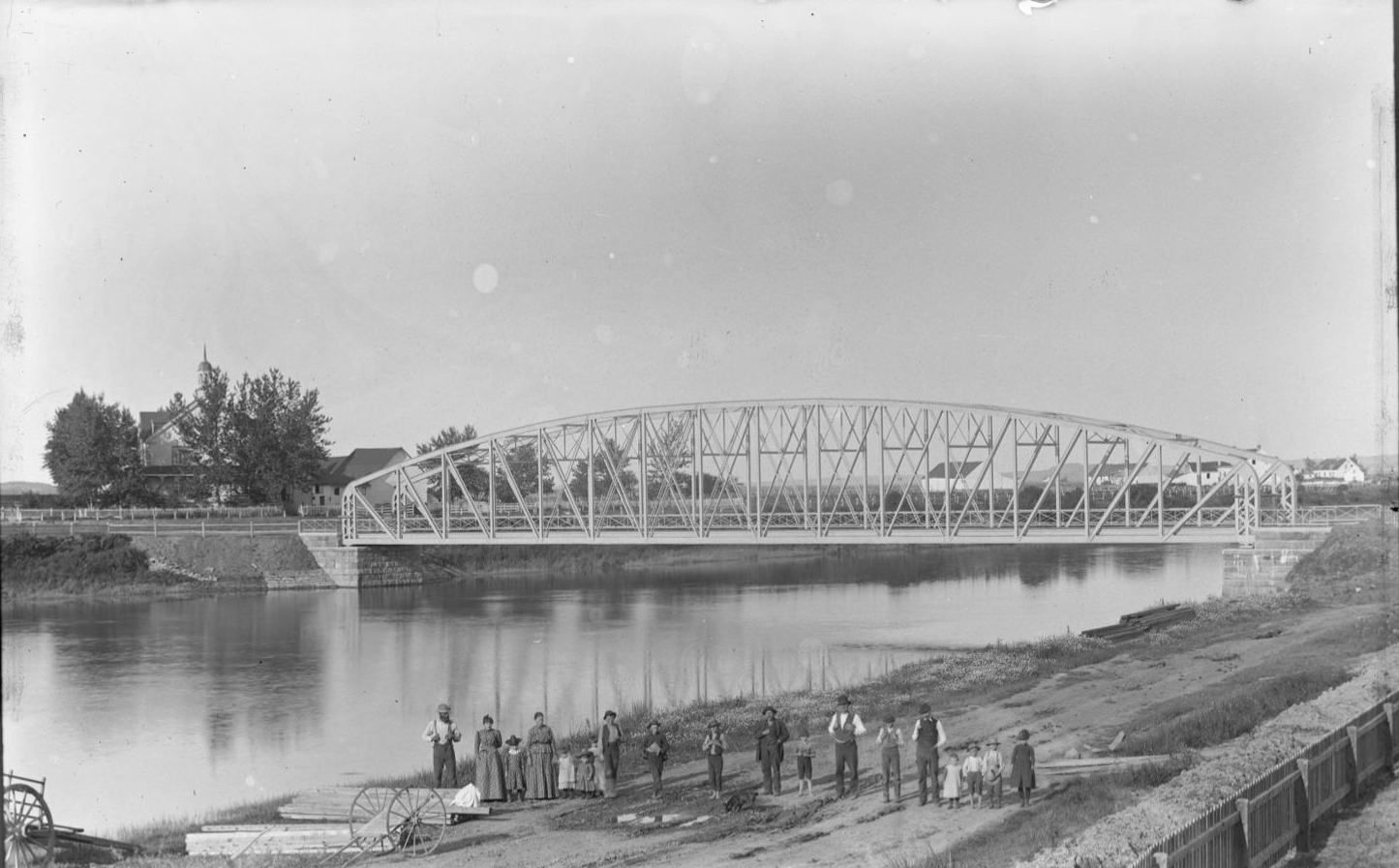

- Location within Quebec

Location
- Country: Canada
- Province: Quebec
- Region: Chaudière-Appalaches, Bas-Saint-Laurent
- MRC: L'Islet Regional County Municipality, Kamouraska Regional County Municipality
- Municipality: Saint-Pacôme, Rivière-Ouelle

Physical characteristics
- Source: Mountain stream
  - location: Tourville
  - coordinates: 47.03194°N 70.11139°W
  - elevation: 345 metres (1,132 ft)
- Mouth: St. Lawrence River
  - location: Rivière-Ouelle
  - coordinates: 47.42528°N 70.04722°W
  - elevation: 3 metres (9.8 ft)
- Length: 734 kilometres (456 mi)
- Basin size: 860 kilometres (534.38 mi)

Basin features
- Tributaries
  - left: (upstream) cours d'eau Bouchard, Damnée River, cours d'eau Joncas, Bras de la rivière Ouelle, ruisseau Charlemagne.
  - right: (upstream) cours d'eau du Cimetière, ruisseau de la Plaine, cours d'eau Lévesque, ruisseau Drapeau, décharge du lac Dargis, ruisseau du Fronteau, cours d'eau Joseph-Ouellet, La Grande Rivière, cours d'eau Paradis, cours d'eau Gérard-Lévesque.

The Ouelle River (in French: rivière Ouelle) is a tributary of the south shore of the St. Lawrence River, in the province of Quebec, in Canada. This river flows successively in the MRC of:

- L'Islet Regional County Municipality (administrative region of Chaudière-Appalaches): municipalities of Sainte-Perpétue, Tourville and Saint-Damase-de-L'Islet;
- Kamouraska Regional County Municipality (administrative region of Bas-Saint-Laurent): municipalities of La Pocatière, Saint-Gabriel-Lalemant, Saint-Pacôme and Rivière-Ouelle.

The Ouelle River flows through the towns of Saint-Pacôme and Rivière-Ouelle in Québec and enters the Saint Lawrence River to the west of Rivière-Ouelle. There are waterfalls (French: Chutes de la Riviere Ouelle) close to the village of Saint-Gabriel-de-Kamouraska.

The main shock epicentre of the Charlevoix earthquake of 1663 is believed to have occurred along the Saint Lawrence River between the mouth of the Malbaie River on the north and the mouth of the Ouelle on the south.

== Geography ==
The Ouelle river has its source in the Notre Dame Mountains east of the junction of Rang Terrebonne and the Rang-Terrebonne crossing. This source is located southwest of the village of Sainte-Perpétue, south of the village of Tourville and east of Lake Therrien.

From its source, the Ouelle river flows for approximately 73 kilometres (45 mi), divided into the following segments:

Upper part of the Ouelle river

- 1.4 kilometres (0.87 mi) west in Sainte-Perpétue, up to Rang Terrebonne;
- 3.2 kilometres (2.0 mi) northward, to the confluence of the Charlemagne stream (coming from the west);
- 3.5 kilometres (2.2 mi) north-east collecting water from the Gérard-Lévesque stream (coming from the south-east), to route 204, connecting Sainte-Perpétue and Tourville;
- 2.5 kilometres (1.6 mi) north, up to the limit between Sainte-Perpétue and Tourville;
- 3.8 kilometres (2.4 mi) northward, to Rang John, which is located adjacent to the confluence of the Bras de la rivière Ouelle (coming from the west);

Intermediate part of the Ouelle river

- 5.6 kilometres (3.5 mi) north, up to 9th Rang;
- 1.7 kilometres (1.1 mi) north-west, to the limit between Tourville and Saint-Damase-de-L'Islet;
- 16.7 kilometres (10.4 mi) northward in a forest zone, to the limit between Saint-Damase-de-L'Islet and La Pocatière;
- 1.5 kilometres (0.93 mi) north, to the covered bridge of Route de l'Eglise;
- 4.9 kilometres (3.0 mi) north, to the Drapeau Sud road bridge;
- 2.3 kilometres (1.4 mi) towards the northeast, crossing the limit between La Pocatière and Saint-Gabriel-Lalemant, up to the confluence of La Grande Rivière (rivière Ouelle) (coming from south-east);

Lower part of the Ouelle river (segment of 26.3 kilometres (16.3 mi))

- 2.2 kilometres (1.4 mi) towards the northeast, straddling the intermunicipal limit four times, in the hamlet "Canton-des-Roches", up to the road bridge on Chemin du Village;
- 1.0 kilometre (0.62 mi) northward, forming the intermunicipal boundary between Saint-Gabriel-Lalemant and Saint-Pacôme;
- 6.6 kilometres (4.1 mi) north in Saint-Gabriel-Lalemant, winding up to the road bridge on Boulevard Bégin (route 230) in the village of Saint-Pacôme;
- 3.1 kilometres (1.9 mi) north, to the bridges on highway 20;
- 1.0 kilometre (0.62 mi) north-west, to the road bridge on Chemin du Sud-de-la-Rivière;
- 9.9 kilometres (6.2 mi) (or 3.3 kilometres (2.1 mi) in a direct line) west, winding up to the highway bridge on route 132;
- 2.5 kilometres (1.6 mi) westward, up to its confluence.

The confluence of the river is located 7.3 kilometres (4.5 mi) west of the center of the village of Saint-Pacôme, 6.4 kilometres (4.0 mi) north of the center of the village of La Pocatière and 3.2 kilometres (2.0 mi) north of the confluence of the Saint-Jean River (La Pocatière).

The Ouelle River, which undergoes the tides of the middle St. Lawrence estuary for a short distance from its confluence, is canoeable. The area of its watershed totals 860 kilometres (534.38 mi). Its average flow rate is 10 cubic metres per second (350 cu ft/s), reaching 100 cubic metres per second (3,500 cu ft/s) in April.

The main tributaries of the Ouelle river are:

- Damnée River,
- Grande Rivière,
  - Chaude River,
  - Sainte-Anne River,
  - Rivière du Rat Musqué,
- Bras de la rivière Ouelle.

== Toponymy ==
The toponym "R. Hoel" appears on a map designed by Jean Bourdon around 1641. This designation of origin honors Louis Houël, Sieur du Petit-Pré, controller of the saltworks of Brouage, member of the Compagnie des Cent-Associés and secretary to the king. Friend and protector of Samuel de Champlain, Houël wintered in Quebec (city) in 1640–1641. He was one of the main instigators of the Récollets coming to New France.

The map drawn up by Jean Deshayes in 1695 bears the modern spelling “rivière Ouelle”.

The toponym “rivière Ouelle” was formalized on December 5, 1968 by the Commission de toponymie du Québec.

== See also ==
- List of rivers of Quebec
