= Grande Rivière (Ouelle River tributary) =

River in MRC L'Islet and Kamouraska, Quebec (Canada)

- Location within Quebec

Location
- Country: Canada
- Province: Quebec
- Region: Chaudière-Appalaches, Bas-Saint-Laurent
- MRC: Kamouraska Regional County Municipality, L'Islet Regional County Municipality

Physical characteristics
- Source: Lake Fournier
  - location: Sainte-Perpétue
  - coordinates: 47.11610°N 69.87767°W
  - elevation: 345 metres (1,132 ft)
- Mouth: Ouelle River
  - location: Saint-Gabriel-Lalemant
  - coordinates: 47.35083°N 69.92861°W
  - elevation: 127 metres (417 ft)
- Length: 32.5 kilometres (20.2 mi)

Basin features
- Tributaries
  - left: (upstream)
  - right: (upstream) Chaude River, Sainte-Anne River, rivière du Rat Musqué

The Grande Rivière (in English: Grand River) is a tributary of the Ouelle River which flows on the south shore of the St. Lawrence River, in the province of Quebec, in Canada.

The Grande Rivière flows successively in the regional county municipalities (MRC) of:

- L'Islet Regional County Municipality (administrative region of Chaudière-Appalaches): municipalities of Sainte-Perpétue, Tourville and Saint-Damase-de-L'Islet;
- Kamouraska Regional County Municipality (administrative region of Bas-Saint-Laurent): municipalities of La Pocatière and Saint-Gabriel-Lalemant.

== Geography ==
The Grande Rivière has its source at Fournier Lake (length: 0.5 kilometres (0.31 mi); altitude: 345 metres (1,132 ft)) which is located in the municipality of Sainte-Perpétue in the heart of the Notre Dame Mountains. This spring is located at 31.6 kilometres (19.6 mi) southeast of the south shore of the St. Lawrence River, at 7.1 kilometres (4.4 mi) northeast of the village center from Sainte-Perpétue and at 8.3 kilometres (5.2 mi) south of the center of the village of Tourville.

From its source, the Grande Rivière flows over 32.5 kilometres (20.2 mi) in forest areas, divided into the following segments:

Upper part of the Grande Rivière (segment of 18.5 kilometres (11.5 mi))

- 3.0 kilometres (1.9 mi) north in Sainte-Perpétue, up to the limit of Tourville;
- 0.4 kilometres (0.25 mi) northward, into Tourville;
- 1.8 kilometres (1.1 mi) northeasterly in Sainte-Perpétue, to the limit of Tourville;
- 9.9 kilometres (6.2 mi) north in Tourville, to the limit between Saint-Damase-de-L'Islet; at the very end of this segment, the Grande Rivière collects water from the rivière du Rat Musqué (coming from the south);
- 3.4 kilometres (2.1 mi) northward, to the confluence of the Sainte-Anne River;

Lower part of the Grande Rivière (segment of 14.0 kilometres (8.7 mi))

- 5.7 kilometres (3.5 mi) north, up to the road bridge;
- 0.4 kilometres (0.25 mi) northward, to the confluence of the Chaude River;
- 6.6 kilometres (4.1 mi) northward in La Pocatière, up to the limit of Saint-Gabriel-Lalemant;
- 1.3 kilometres (0.81 mi) westward, forming a northward loop in Saint-Gabriel-Lalemant, to its confluence.

The confluence of the river is located in the municipality of Saint-Gabriel-Lalemant, very close to the limit of La Pocatière. This confluence is 3.5 kilometres (2.2 mi) south of the center of the village of Saint-Gabriel-de-Kamouraska, 8.6 kilometres (5.3 mi) east of the center of the village of La Pocatière, at 6.5 kilometres (4.0 mi) south of the center of the village of Saint-Pacôme. This confluence is located 2.2 kilometres (1.4 mi) upstream of the Chemin du Village bridge, in the hamlet of Canton-des-Roches.

The Grande Rivière is canoeable.

== Toponymy ==
The toponym La Grande Rivière was made official on December 5, 1968, by the Commission de toponymie du Québec.

== See also ==
- List of rivers of Quebec
