= Sainte-Anne River (Grande Rivière tributary) =

River in MRC Kamouraska in Quebec, Canada

- Location within Quebec
- Native name: Rivière Sainte-Anne (French)

Location
- Country: Canada
- Province: Quebec
- Region: Bas-Saint-Laurent
- MRC: Kamouraska Regional County Municipality

Physical characteristics
- Source: Petit lac Sainte-Anne
  - location: Mont-Carmel
  - coordinates: 47.21332°N 69.804769°W
  - elevation: 350 metres (1,150 ft)
- Mouth: Grande Rivière
  - location: La Pocatière
  - coordinates: 47.25833°N 69.88972°W
  - elevation: 168 metres (551 ft)
- Length: 8.9 kilometres (5.5 mi)

Basin features
- Tributaries
  - left: (upstream)
  - right: (upstream)

The Sainte-Anne River (in French: rivière Sainte-Anne) flows successively in the unorganized territory of Petit-Lac-Sainte-Anne and in the city of La Pocatière, in the Kamouraska Regional County Municipality, in the administrative region of Bas-Saint-Laurent, in Quebec, in Canada.

The Sainte-Anne river is a tributary of the east bank of Grande Rivière, which flows on the east bank of the Ouelle River which empties in turn on the south shore of the St. Lawrence River at the height of Rivière-Ouelle.

== Geography ==
The Sainte-Anne River has its source at Petit lac Sainte-Anne (length: 2.1 kilometres (1.3 mi); altitude: 350 metres (1,150 ft)) which is connected to lac Saint-Anne (length: 3.1 kilometres (1.9 mi); altitude: 350 metres (1,150 ft)), located to the west of the first. This last lake straddles the boundary between the municipality of Sainte-Perpétue. These two water bodies are interconnected by a 0.6 kilometres (0.37 mi) long strait in an east–west direction. These bodies of water are part of the unorganized territory of Petit-Lac-Sainte-Anne, located in the heart of Notre Dame Mountains. This spring is located at 24.4 kilometres (15.2 mi) south-east of the south shore of the St. Lawrence River, at 17.1 kilometres (10.6 mi) south-east of the village center from Saint-Onésime-d'Ixworth, to 18.4 kilometres (11.4 mi) north-east of the village center of Sainte-Perpétue and to 26.3 kilometres (16.3 mi) southeast of the village center of Mont-Carmel.

From the retention dyke at the north mouth of Petit lac Sainte-Anne, the Sainte-Anne river flows entirely through a forest environment over 8.9 kilometres (5.5 mi), divided into the following segments:

- 1.8 kilometres (1.1 mi) northward in the unorganized territory of Petit-Lac-Sainte-Anne, to the Étang de l'Écluse, which the current crosses northward on 1.3 kilometres (0.81 mi), up to its mouth located on the northwest side;
- 4.1 kilometres (2.5 mi) towards the north-west, cutting the Canadian National railway line at the beginning of this segment, to the limit of the city of La Pocatière;
- 3.0 kilometres (1.9 mi) westward into La Pocatière, to its confluence.

The Sainte-Anne river flows on the east bank of La Grande Rivière. This confluence is located 0.4 kilometres (0.25 mi) upstream of a bridge on Ixworth Road and 16.0 metres (52.5 ft) to the southeast of the southern coast of the St. Lawrence River.

== Toponymy ==
The toponym “rivière Sainte-Anne” was formalized on December 5, 1968, by the Commission de toponymie du Québec.

== See also ==
- List of rivers of Quebec
