= Rivière du Rat Musqué =

River in MRC L'Islet in Quebec, Canada

- Location within Quebec

Location
- Country: Canada
- Province: Quebec
- Region: Chaudière-Appalaches
- MRC: L'Islet Regional County Municipality

Physical characteristics
- Source: Lac du Rat Musqué
  - location: Sainte-Perpétue
  - coordinates: 47.139841°N 69.845828°W
  - elevation: 330 metres (1,080 ft)
- Mouth: Grande Rivière
  - location: Tourville
  - coordinates: 47.21972°N 69.89027°W
  - elevation: 211 metres (692 ft)
- Length: 11.4 kilometres (7.1 mi)

Basin features
- Tributaries
  - left: (upstream)
  - right: (upstream)

The rivière du Rat Musqué (in English: Muskrat River) flows successively in the municipality of Sainte-Perpétue and in the municipalities of Tourville, in the L'Islet Regional County Municipality, in the administrative region of Chaudière-Appalaches, in Québec, in Canada.

The Musk Rat River is a tributary of the east bank of Grande Rivière, which flows onto the east bank of the Ouelle River which in turn flows into the south shore of the St. Lawrence River at Rivière-Ouelle.

== Geography ==
The Rivière du Rat Musqué takes its source at Lac du Rat Musqué (length: 0.2 kilometres (0.12 mi); altitude: 322 metres (1,056 ft)) which is bypassed on the south side by the Canadian National. This source is located in the heart of Notre Dame Mountains at:

- 29.0 kilometres (18.0 mi) southeast of the south shore of the St. Lawrence River;
- 21.7 kilometres (13.5 mi) southeast of the center of the village of Saint-Onésime-d'Ixworth;
- 11.3 kilometres (7.0 mi) northeast of the center of the village of Tourville;
- 10.7 kilometres (6.6 mi) northeast of the center of the village of Sainte-Perpétue;
- 3.5 kilometres (2.2 mi) southwest of Lac Sainte-Anne.

From Lac du Rat Musqué, the Rat Musqué river flows entirely through a forest environment over 11.4 kilometres (7.1 mi), divided into the following segments:

- 5.3 kilometres (3.3 mi) north along more or less the railroad, then north-west, in the municipality of Sainte-Perpétue, to the municipal boundary of Tourville;
- 6.1 kilometres (3.8 mi) northwesterly in the municipality of Tourville, until its confluence.

The Rat Musqué river meets on the east bank of Grande Rivière. This confluence is located very close to the southeastern limit of the municipality of Saint-Damase-de-L'Islet and at 19.3 kilometres (12.0 mi) to the southeast of the southern coast of St. Lawrence River.

== Toponym ==
The toponym Rivière du Rat Musqué was formalized on December 5, 1968, by the Commission de toponymie du Québec.

== See also ==
- List of rivers of Quebec
