= Bras de la rivière Ouelle =

River in MRC L'Islet in Quebec (Canada)

Bras de la Rivière Ouelle
- Location within Quebec

Location
- Country: Canada
- Province: Quebec
- Region: Chaudière-Appalaches
- MRC: L'Islet Regional County Municipality

Physical characteristics
- Source
  - location: Tourville
  - coordinates: 47.01877°N 69.99805°W
  - elevation: 350 metres (1,150 ft)
- Mouth: Ouelle River
  - location: Tourville
  - coordinates: 47.11361°N 69.95055°W
  - elevation: 272 metres (892 ft)
- Length: 12.7 kilometres (7.9 mi)

Basin features
- Tributaries
  - left: (upstream) Décharge du lac des Athacas
  - right: (upstream)

The Bras de la Rivière Ouelle (in English: Arm of the Ouelle River) is a tributary of the Ouelle River, flowing entirely in the municipality of Tourville, in the L'Islet Regional County Municipality, in the administrative region of Chaudière-Appalaches, in province of Quebec, in Canada.

== Geography ==
The arm of the Ouelle River has its source at Lake Therrien (lengthː 1.6 kilometres (0.99 mi); altitudeː 381 metres (1,250 ft)), in the canton of Fournier, in the western part of the municipality of Tourville (47.032695°N 70.109253°W), in the Notre Dame Mountains. This lake is located 10.9 kilometres (6.8 mi) south-west of the center of the village of Tourville, at 12.7 kilometres (7.9 mi) south-west of the center of the village of Sainte-Perpétue and 11.3 kilometres (7.0 mi) east of the center of the village of Saint-Cyrille-de-Lessard. The Canadian National railroad runs on the northwest shore of the lake. The resort is developed on the north shore of the lake.

From Lake Therrien, the arm of the Ouelle River flows over 17.9 kilometres (11.1 mi), distributed according to the following segmentsː

- 11.9 kilometres (7.4 mi) towards the northeast, following more or less the course of the railway, until the outlet of the lake of Athacas (coming from the northwest);
- 2.0 kilometres (1.2 mi) eastward, to rue Principale de Tourville, which it intersects at 0.9 kilometres (0.56 mi) north-west of the village center;
- 4.0 kilometres (2.5 mi) towards the northeast, until its confluence where it flows into the Ouelle River (coming from the south).

The Rang John road bridge spans the Ouelle River and the confluence of the Ouelle River arm is located near the bridge (northwest side). This confluence is located 3.1 kilometres (1.9 mi) northeast of the center of the village of Tourville.

== Toponym ==
The origin of the toponym arm of the Ouelle River derives from the name of the Ouelle river.

The toponym "R. Hoel" appears on a map designed by Jean Bourdon around 1641 to designate the Ouelle river. This designation of origin evokes Louis Houël, Sieur du Petit-Pré, controller of the salt works of Brouage, member of the Compagnie des Cent-Associés and secretary to the king. Friend and protector of Samuel de Champlain, Houël wintered in Quebec in 1640–1641. He was one of the main instigators of the Récollets coming to New France.

The map drawn up by Jean Deshayes of 1695 bears the modern spelling of the Ouelle river.

The toponym "arm of the Ouelle River" was formalized on December 5, 1968, by the Commission de toponymie du Québec.

== See also ==
- List of rivers of Quebec
