= Damnée River =

River in L'Islet in Quebec (Canada)

- Location within Quebec

Location
- Country: Canada
- Province: Quebec
- Region: Chaudière-Appalaches
- MRC: L'Islet Regional County Municipality
- Municipality: Saint-Damase-de-L'Islet

Physical characteristics
- Source: Mountain and forest stream
  - location: Saint-Damase-de-L'Islet
  - coordinates: 47.123894°N 70.091586°W
  - elevation: 382 metres (1,253 ft)
- Mouth: St. Lawrence River
  - location: Saint-Damase-de-L'Islet
  - coordinates: 47.18611°N 69.99028°W
  - elevation: 3 metres (9.8 ft)
- Length: 16.7 kilometres (10.4 mi)

Basin features
- Tributaries
  - left: (upstream)
  - right: (upstream)

The Damnée River (in French: rivière Damnée) flows entirely in the municipality of Saint-Damase-de-L'Islet, in the L'Islet Regional County Municipality, in the administrative region of Chaudière-Appalaches, in the province of Quebec, in Canada.

The Damnée river is a tributary of the Ouelle River which flows northeast and empties into the municipality of Rivière-Ouelle, on the south shore of the St. Lawrence River.

== Geography ==
The Damnée river takes its source from streams descending the eastern slope of Mont Fournier which is located in the municipality of Saint-Damase-de-L'Islet, very close to the limit of the municipality of Saint-Aubert, in the heart of Notre Dame Mountains. This spring is located at 15.4 kilometres (9.6 mi) southeast of the south shore of the St. Lawrence River, at 4.4 kilometres (2.7 mi) east of Lac Trois Saumons, at 11.3 kilometres (7.0 mi) southeast of the center of the village of Saint-Aubert and at 8.3 kilometres (5.2 mi) south of the center of village of Saint-Damase-de-L'Islet.

From its source, the Damnée river flows over 16.7 kilometres (10.4 mi) in a forest zone, divided into the following segments:

- 3.9 kilometres (2.4 mi) heading northeast through Saint-Damase-de-L'Islet, to route 204;
- 2.6 kilometres (1.6 mi) northeasterly, to the outlet of Lac Boucher;
- 2.8 kilometres (1.7 mi) to the northeast;
- 7.4 kilometres (4.6 mi) towards the northeast, until its confluence.

The confluence of the Damnée river is located in the municipality of Saint-Damase-de-L'Islet, at 2.7 kilometres (1.7 mi) downstream of the limit of Tourville. This confluence is 12.8 kilometres (8.0 mi) east of Lac Sainte-Anne (located in Tourville), at 9.7 kilometres (6.0 mi) north of village of Tourville.

== Toponymy ==
The toponym Damnée river was formalized on December 5, 1968, by the Commission de toponymie du Québec.

== See also ==
- List of rivers of Quebec
