= Roquemaure, Quebec =

Roquemaure
- Municipality
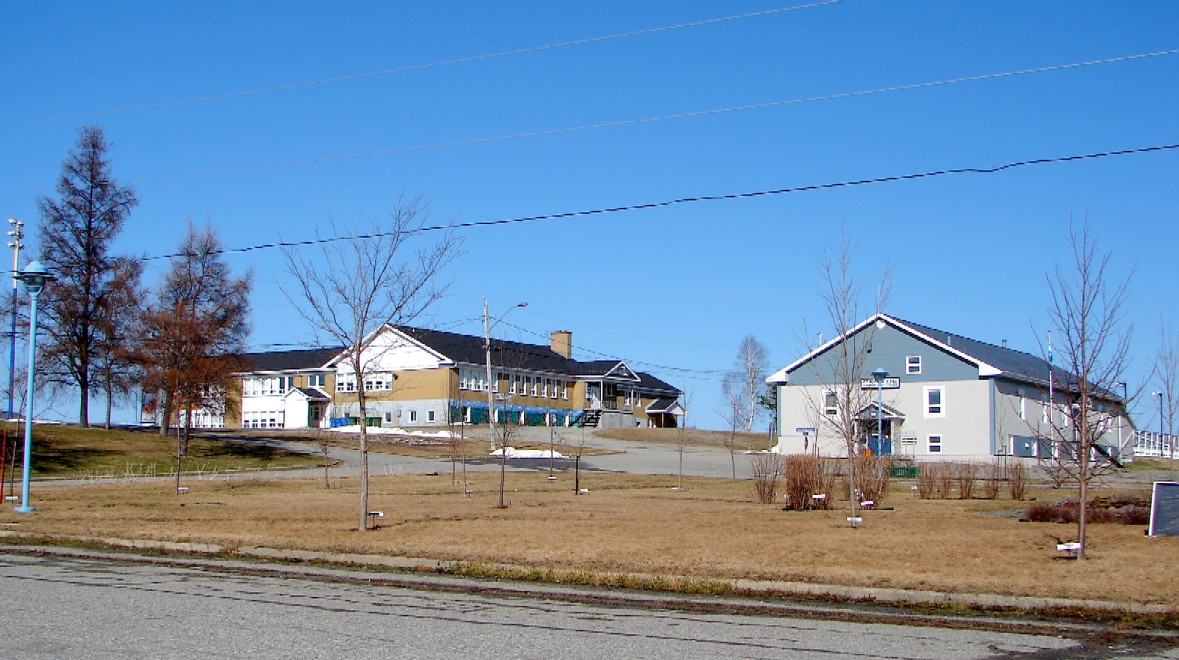

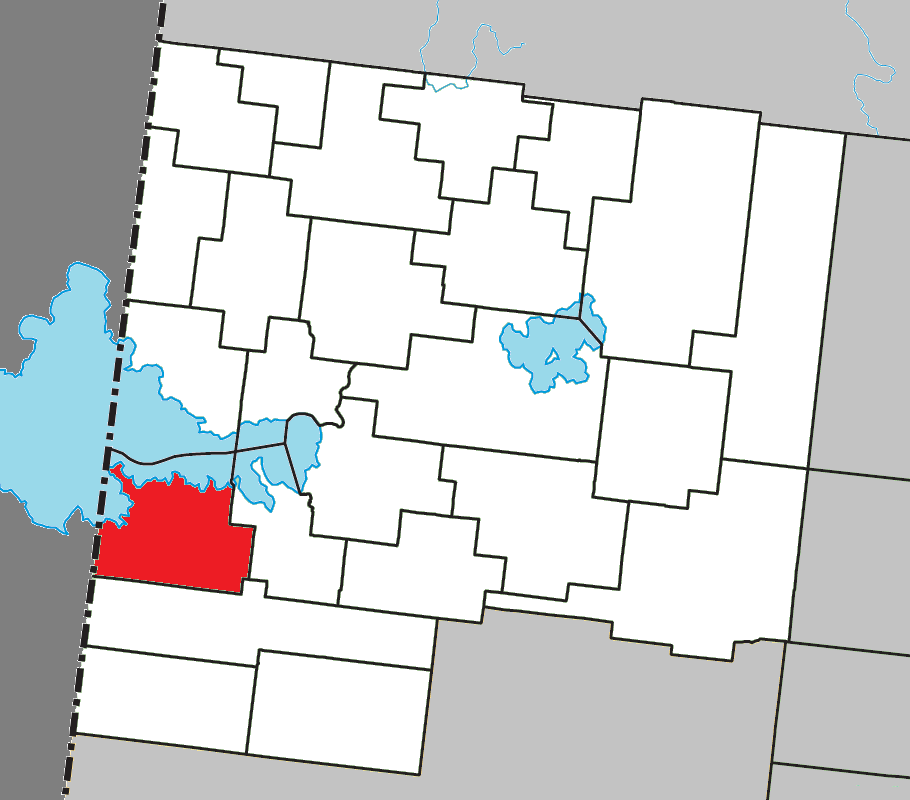
- Location within Abitibi-Ouest RCM

- Location in western Quebec
- Coordinates: 48°36′N 79°24′W
- Country: Canada
- Province: Quebec
- Region: Abitibi-Témiscamingue
- RCM: Abitibi-Ouest
- Settled: 1933
- Constituted: January 1, 1952

Government
  - Mayor: Mathieu Guillemette
  - Federal riding: Abitibi—Témiscamingue
  - Prov. riding: Abitibi-Ouest

Area
  - Total: 153.97 km^{2} (59.45 sq mi)
  - Land: 120.02 km^{2} (46.34 sq mi)

Population (2021)
  - Total: 409
  - Density: 3.4/km^{2} (8.8/sq mi)
  - Pop (2016-21): ▲3.5%
  - Dwellings: 215
- Time zone: UTC−5 (EST)
  - Summer (DST): UTC−4 (EDT)
- Postal code(s): J0Z 3K0
- Area code: 819
- Highways: No major routes
- Website: roquemaure.ao.ca/fr/

Roquemaure (French pronunciation: [ʁɔkmɔʁ]) is a municipality in northwestern Quebec, Canada in the MRC d'Abitibi-Ouest. It covers 120.02 km^{2} and had a population of 409 as of the 2021 Canadian census.

The municipality was incorporated on January 1, 1952. The name evokes the memory of Jean-Georges Dejean de Roquemaure, who was promoted to second lieutenant in 1723, captain in 1735, lieutenant-colonel in the Queen's regiment in 1755 and brigadier in 1759. Roquemaure is originally a place name from the south of France, derived from the Occitan ròca maura, francised as roque maure and meaning ‘rock’, ‘dark rock’ or ‘black’.

== History ==
The settlement of Roquemaure dates back to 1933 when Father François-Xavier Jean and Mr. Auguste Scott, both professors at the School of Agriculture of Sainte-Anne-de-la-Pocatière, went to Abitibi to choose land where the Colonization Society of the diocese of Quebec, in the process of being formed, would lead the establishment of colonists. The choice of Roquemaure, rather than another township, is based on the advantageous afforestation present and on its proximity to Lake Abitibi and the Duparquet River supposedly favorable to a more lenient climate. The Colonization Society of the diocese of Quebec would be founded one month later. Mgr Auguste Boulet, superior of the College of Sainte-Anne-de-la-Pocatière, chairs the organization. The Colonization Society undertakes to provide the colonists with food and essentials for the first winter, and no more. It has a meager budget, $250 granted by Cardinal Villeneuve and $400 from the Ministry of Colonization. The first settlers would arrive two months later, including Pierre Pelletier, Léon Briand, Ludger Dionne, Gustave Massé, Albert Raymond, Alphonse Charest and Ernest Lévesque. A second group would arrive two weeks later coming from Saint-Cyrille-de-Lessard, Ashford, Port-Joli, Sainte-Perpétue and Woodbridge. Among them were: Amédée Bélanger, Étienne Caron, Jos. Chrétien, Georges Chrétien, Gérard Fournier, Maurice Gamache, Wellie Plourde, Octave Plourde (fils de Wellie), François Pellerin, Auguste Bélanger, Albert Giasson, Ernest Dionne, Alfred Dubé, Marc Fortin, Cyrille Lamarre and Noël Lord. A third wave of settlers would arrive one month later, including: Elzéard Chouinard, Jos. Pit Fortin, Laurent Lebel, Georges Mainville, Rosaire Mainville, Léo St-Amant and Oscar Soucy. The first mass would be celebrated on the last thursday of the year by Father Ephrem Halde, parish priest of Palmarolle, in the camp of Amédée Bélanger. The settlers sing hymns, accompanied by the violin of Gérard Fournier.

March 1934 marks the arrival of arrival of Mrs. Maria Lord, spouse of Gérard Fournier, first woman to enter the colony, as well as her six children. She later said: “It’s a remarkable date. I left Port-Joli on the feast of Saint-Joseph, March 19, and three days later I arrived here". One year later, the first two teachers arrives in the colony, Misses Anna-Marie and Germaine Martel, daughters of Charles Martel of Saint-Marc-des-Carrières. In 1937, the film En pays neufs, is released by Father Maurice Proulx. This is a directed documentary which focuses on the so-called success of the colonization of Abitibi and mainly in Roquemaure.

In the 1940's the population numbers 1,150 people including 170 families. The colony includes 8 schools (9 classes) which are attended by 223 children. Since its foundation, Roquemaure has seen 334 baptisms, 67 marriages and 45 burials. This development permits the official creation of the Municipality of Roquemaure in 1952. Some of the important milestone from the municipality includes the day the church of burns down in 1970 and the construction of church Sainte-Anne. Also, in 1983 an episode of Soirée canadienne was shot in Roquemaure.

== Demographics ==
=== Population ===
Canada census – Roquemaure community profile

	2021	2016	2011
Population	409 (+3.4% from 2016)	395 (-4.6% from 2011)	414 (+3.0% from 2006)
Land area	120.02 km^{2} (46.34 sq mi)	120.86 km^{2} (46.66 sq mi)	120.78 km^{2} (46.63 sq mi)
Population density	3.4/km^{2} (8.8/sq mi)	3.3/km^{2} (8.5/sq mi)	3.4/km^{2} (8.8/sq mi)
Median age	48.4 (M: 44.4, F: 50.8)	47.8 (M: 48.2, F: 47.2)	46.4 (M: 45.8, F: 47.5)
Private dwellings	215 (total) 185 (occupied)	215 (total) 175 (occupied)	207 (total)
Median household income	$62,400	$51,776	$43,118

References: 2021 2016 2011

Historical census populations – Roquemaure, Quebec

Year	Pop.	±%
1956	1,276	—
1961	1,149	−10.0%
1966	990	−13.8%
1971	868	−12.3%
1976	682	−21.4%
1981	554	−18.8%
1986	508	−8.3%

Year	Pop.	±%
1991	455	−10.4%
1996	459	+0.9%
2001	451	−1.7%
2006	402	−10.9%
2011	414	+3.0%
2016	395	−4.6%
2021	409	+3.5%

Source: Statistics Canada

Private dwellings occupied by usual residents (2021): 185 (total dwellings: 215)

Mother tongue (2021):

- English as first language: 1%
- French as first language: 98%
- English and French as first language: 0%
- Other as first language: 1%

== Government ==
Municipal council (2024):

- Mayor: Mathieu Guillemette
- Councillors: Chantal Mainville, Josée Chrétien, Marcel Mainville, Jacques Bergeron, Sébastien Roy, Bertrand Béchard

List of former mayors:

- Marcel Mainville (...–2009)
- Léo Pinard (2009–2013)
- Lucie Gravel (2013–2017)
- Léo Plourde (2017–2021)
- Rachel Alarie (2021–2023)
- Mathieu Guillemette (2023–present)
