= Chaude River (Grande Rivière tributary) =

River in MRC Kamouraska in Quebec (Canada)

- Location within Quebec
- Native name: Rivière Chaude (French)

Location
- Country: Canada
- Province: Quebec
- Region: Bas-Saint-Laurent
- MRC: Kamouraska Regional County Municipality

Physical characteristics
- Source: Lake Chaudière
  - location: Mont-Carmel
  - coordinates: 47.288299°N 69.764265°W
  - elevation: 381 metres (1,250 ft)
- Mouth: Grande Rivière
  - location: La Pocatière
  - coordinates: 47.30194°N 69.90361°W
  - elevation: 153 metres (502 ft)
- Length: 15.1 kilometres (9.4 mi)

Basin features
- Tributaries
  - left: (upstream) Tête de la Rivière Chaude
  - right: (upstream)

The Chaude River (in French: rivière Chaude) flows successively in the municipalities of Mont-Carmel, Saint-Gabriel-Lalemant and La Pocatière, in the Kamouraska Regional County Municipality, in the administrative region of Bas-Saint-Laurent, in Quebec, in Canada.

The Chaude River is a tributary of the east bank of the Grande River, which flows on the eastern bank of the Ouelle River which in turn flows on the south bank of the St. Lawrence River.

== Geography ==
The Chaude River has its source in Chaudière Lake (length: 2.7 kilometres (1.7 mi); altitude: 381 metres (1,250 ft)) which is located in the municipality of Mont-Carmel in the heart of the Notre Dame Mountains. This spring is located at 22.6 kilometres (14.0 mi) southeast of the south shore of the St. Lawrence River, at 29.4 kilometres (18.3 mi) northeast of the village center from Sainte-Perpétue and at 15.3 kilometres (9.5 mi) southeast of the center of the village of Mont-Carmel.

From its source, the Chaude River flows over 15.1 kilometres (9.4 mi), with a drop of 228 metres (748 ft), divided into the following segments:

- 1.4 kilometres (0.87 mi) towards the south in Mont-Carmel, until the confluence of a stream (coming from the south) which drains the locality “La Plaine Molle”;
- 1.0 kilometre (0.62 mi) north-west, up to the confluence of the waterway designated "Tête de la Rivière Chaude" which has its source at Lac des Cinq Milles and flows 12.6 kilometres (7.8 mi);
- 3.3 kilometres (2.1 mi) northeasterly, to the Canadian National railway;
- 3.3 kilometres (2.1 mi) westward, up to the limit between Saint-Gabriel-Lalemant;
- 2.0 kilometres (1.2 mi) westward in Saint-Gabriel-Lalemant, to the limit of La Pocatière;
- 4.1 kilometres (2.5 mi) westward, up to its confluence.

The confluence of the river is located in the city of La Pocatière. This confluence is located 0.6 kilometres (0.37 mi) upstream of the covered bridge.

== Toponymy ==
The toponym Chaude River was formalized on December 2, 1975, by the Commission de toponymie du Québec.

== See also ==
- List of rivers of Quebec
