= Musée québécois de l'agriculture et de l'alimentation =

Coordinates: 47.3672°N 70.0424°W

The Musée québécois de l'agriculture et de l'alimentation, formerly known as Musée François-Pilote, is a museum of Québécois ethnology located La Pocatière, Quebec, Canada. The museum features a wide variety of collections and displays, and specializes in the history of agricultural education in the region.

The museum's namesake, l'Abbé François Pilote, founded the first permanent school of agriculture in Canada (and the second in North America, after Michigan Agricultural College), and the museum showcases equipment used throughout the history of the school. The fourth and top floor of the museum is dedicated to the history of agricultural education, as well as a display of birds preserved by the ornithologist Antoine Tanguay.

The third floor presents examples of rooms from Québécois homes in the early 1900s; there are three from a bourgeois household, and several from the home of a well-off farmer, using the real furniture from his estate, as well as an example of a rural schoolroom, country store, optician's office, and the offices of a parish priest, notary, doctor and dentist. There is an exhibit on the work of l'Abbé Maurice Proulx, a pioneer in Québécois cinema and a former educator at the School of Agriculture.

The second floor presents the animals of the region, as well as a visiting exhibition which changes each year.

Finally, on the first floor is the history of maple syrup production, a display of the tools of several crafts practiced in the region, an exhibit of modes of transportation, and examples of agricultural machinery.
