= Jean Lesueur =

Jean Lesueur may refer to:

- Jean Le Sueur (1598–1668), French priest
- Jean-François Le Sueur (1760–1837), French composer
- Jean Lesueur (tennis) (1910–1969), French tennis player

== See also ==
- Jean Lesieur (1904–1943), French sailor
