= Sainte-Perpétue, Quebec =

There are two municipalities named Sainte-Perpétue in Quebec:

- Sainte-Perpétue, Centre-du-Québec, Quebec, in Nicolet-Yamaska Regional County Municipality
- Sainte-Perpétue, Chaudière-Appalaches, Quebec, in L'Islet Regional County Municipality
