= Cégep de La Pocatière =

Public college in La Pocatière, Quebec

Coordinates: 47°22′03″N 70°02′27″W

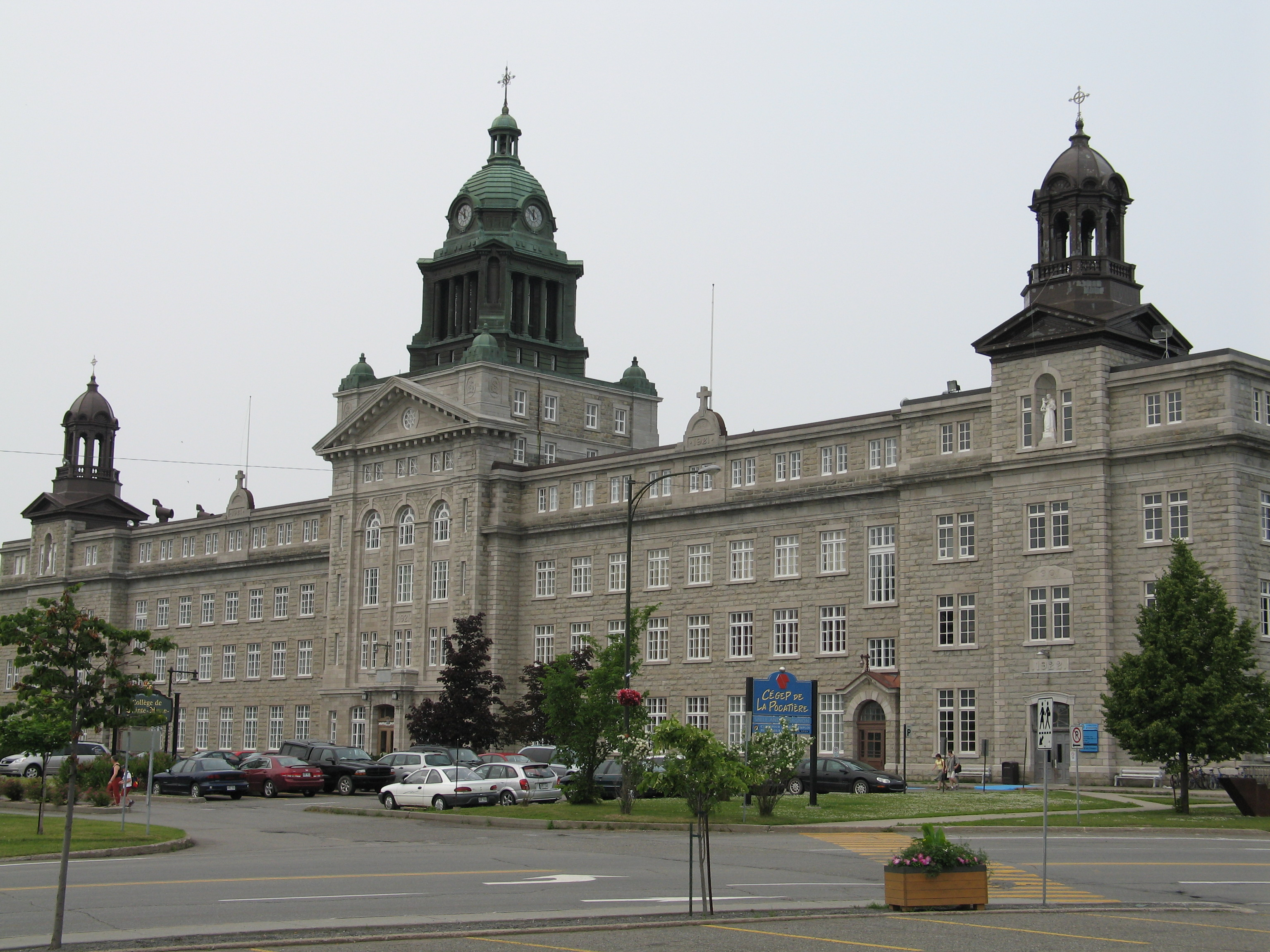
- Motto: Viens changer d'air
- Motto in English: Come for a change of air
- Type: Public CEGEP
- Established: 1967
- Academic affiliations: ACCC, CCAA,
- Students: 2,000 students 1,000 full-time & 1,000 continuing studies
- Location: 140, 4e avenue, La Pocatière, Quebec, Canada
- Campus: Urban, one hour east of Quebec city
- Website: www.cegeplapocatiere.qc.ca

Cégep de la Pocatière is a Cégep in La Pocatière, Quebec, Canada.

== Campus ==
The CEGEP has a campus at La Pocatière and the campus of Centre d'études collégiales de Montmagny.

== Partnership ==
The College of General and Vocational Education is affiliated with the ACCC, and CCAA.

== History ==
In 1967, several institutions were merged and became public ones, when the Quebec system of CEGEPs was created.

== Programs ==
Cégep de La Pocatière in 2026

The CEGEP offers two types of programs: four pre-university and eight technical. The pre-university programs, which take two years to complete, cover the subject matters which roughly correspond to the additional year of high school given elsewhere in Canada in preparation for a chosen field in university. The technical programs, which take three-years to complete, applies to students who wish to pursue a skill trade. In addition Continuing education and services to business are provided.

== See also ==
- List of colleges in Quebec
- Higher education in Quebec
