= Maurice Proulx =

Canadian priest and filmmaker

Maurice Proulx OC OQ
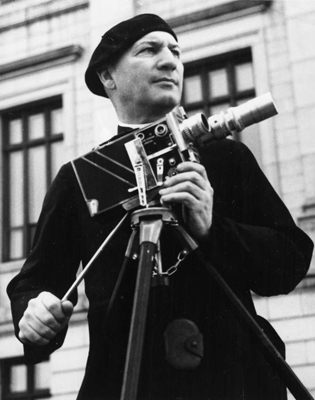
- Born: Joseph Maurice Proulx; April 13, 1902; Saint-Pierre-de-Montmagny, Quebec, Canada
- Died: June 7, 1988 (aged 86); La Pocatière, Quebec, Canada
- Education: Agricultural School of Saint-Anne-de-la-Pocatière (BAgr); Cornell University (PhD, agriculture)
- Occupations: Priest, Agronomist, Filmmaker
- Employer: Service de ciné-photographie provincial
- Notable work: En pays neufs En pays pittoresque
- Honours: Honorary doctorate from Concordia University; Gold medal from the ordre du mérite agricole Gloire de l'Escolle medal from Université Laval

Maurice Proulx (13 April 1902 – 7 June 1988) was a Québécois priest, agronomist and filmmaker.

== Biography ==
Joseph Maurice Proulx was born on 13 April 1902 in Saint-Pierre-de-la-Rivière-du-Sud, Québec to Fortunat Proulx, a farmer, and Gracia Blais. He was the first of sixteen children.

Proulx's parents valued education, and thus, uncharacteristically for the time period, Proulx did not work on his parents' fields and was instead sent to school. In 1915, he joined the Montmagny college for his commercial in 1915 for his commercial course, before joining the College of Saint-Anne-de-la-Pocatière in 1916 for his classical course. He obtained his diploma in 1924.

He entered the Séminaire de Québec in 1924. He was a good student and was named room supervisor in the Agricultural School. He was ordained priest in 1928. The next year, he enrolled in the Agricultural School of Saint-Anne-de-la-Pocatière. He became friends with many of his professors, including Adélard Godbout. He obtained a Bachelor of Agricultural Sciences in 1931.

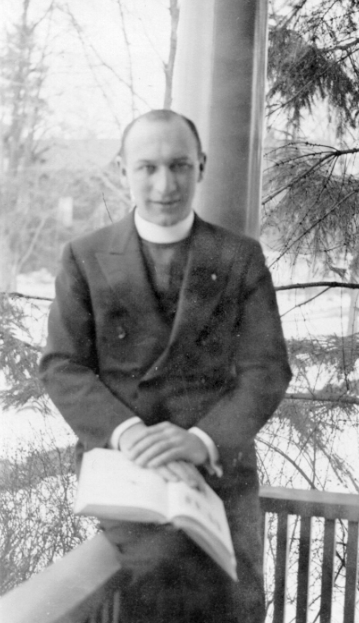
Maurice Proulx, 1932-1933

Proulx was given a grant by the government of Québec on the request of the bishop Jean-Marie-Rodrigue Villeneuve to pursue his studies in the United States. Proulx enrolled in Cornell University, New York.

Proulx could read and write in English, but did not know American slang. To learn, he initially read funny papers, then started watching movies. Proulx watched every film screening of Ithaca's two movie theaters for months on end. He thus inadvertently grew impassioned with movies.

After attending a conference organized at Cornell University in which a presenter commented a silent documentary, Proulx realized the didactic potential of films and bought a Ciné-Kodak Model K using funds sent by the Agricultural School.

In 1933, Proulx obtained his doctorate in agronomy and returned to Québec. He completed an internship the next year.

=== Filmmaking career ===
Proulx became an agronomy professor at the Agricultural School of Saint-Anne-de-la-Pocatière. He continued using his Kodak camera, which he carried with him at all times.

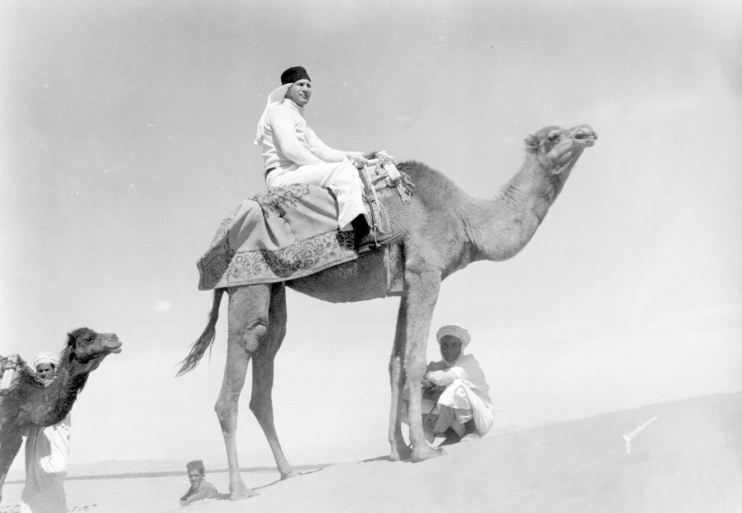
Maurice Proulx in Biskra, Algeria (1936)

On the request of his director François-Xavier Jean, Proulx joined a group of priests-settlers to Roquemaure and spent the next three years filming their lives. The resulting footage would become his first feature film, En pays neufs : un documentaire sur l'Abitibi.

At the same time, in 1936, he took a seven-month trip to Europe and North Africa, visiting France, England, Scotland, Germany, Switzerland, the Netherlands, Belgium, Spain, Italy and Algeria. He filmed footage there, but did not make a movie.

In 1937, the Deputy Minister of Colonisation Joseph-Ernest Laforce offered Proulx to showcase En pays neufs in the Provincial Exhibition of Quebec. Proulx however could not comment the film during the event's ten days, for thirteen hours each day, and instead offered to make a sound film if all expenses were paid by the government. Laforce accepted.

Sonorization on 16 mm film had by then only existed for a few months. Proulx went to New York and was taught how to sonorize a 16 mm film by a Polish engineer named Toulousky. He returned to Québec, and with his friend Maurice Montgrain composed the film's soundtrack and wrote its script. They returned to New York to finalize the editing with Toulousky. On the Provincial Exhibition's eve, the sonorization of En pays neufs was achieved and presented to the Minister and Deputy minister of colonization, to their approval. The movie was showcased at the Provincial Exhibition and was strongly praised by attendees. It was the first sonorized documentary feature film in Québec's history.

In 1938, Proulx was hired by the Ministry of Colonization to make a film about the colonization of Gaspésie. He again worked with Montgrain in New York to record the movie's soundtrack and commentary, but chose the River Sound Studio recording studio instead of Toulousky's. The unfinished version of this movie called En pays pittoresque : un documentaire sur la Gaspésie would be shown in the 1938 Provincial Exhibition. It was the longest feature film of its time in Québec, lasting over two hours.

Proulx grew famous thanks to En pays neufs and En pays pittoresque. He participated in the Service de ciné-photographie provincial's creation in 1941 and made many films on its behalf. Proulx produced over thirty films between 1944 and 1959, most for the government under Godbout or Duplessis. He had become a full-time filmmaker by 1944 and was very wealthy by the 1950s.

In 1953 he participated in the creation of the Social service of childhood and family in La Pocatière. He took care of adoptions, and gradually reduced his filmmaking activity in favor of this duty.

In 1955–1959, Proulx still made movies, but often as a producer. Proulx was sidelined by the new Jean Lesage government and then stopped almost all filmmaking. He retired in La Pocatière after a heart attack in 1966.

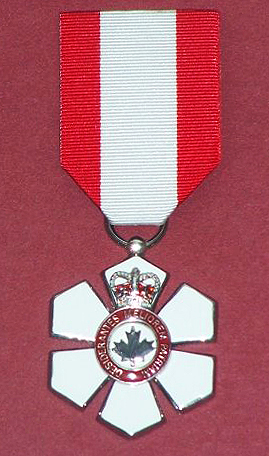
Replica of Proulx's Order of Canada medal

In 1979, he was given an honorary degree by the University of Concordia, and that same year Radio-Canada broadcast a three hours long program about him called Le cinéaste d'un Québec oublié. In 1984, he was honored by the Montreal World Film Festival, which he attended yearly. In 1985, he received a gold medal from the ordre du mérite agricole and the Gloire de l'Escolle medal from Laval University. The Association pour le développement et l'application de la technologie en éducation also created the Maurice Proulx prize. In 1986 he was a recipient of the Order of Canada, and in 1987, of the Order of Québec.

Proulx died on 7 June 1988 at his La Pocatière home.

== Filmography ==
Year	Title
1937	En pays neufs : un documentaire sur l'Abitibi
1938	La vache canadienne
1938	Congrès eucharistique de Québec
1939	En pays pittoresque : un documentaire sur la Gaspésie
1939	Le labour Richard
1942	En pays neufs - Saint-Anne de Roquemaure
1942	La betterave à sucre
1942	Les couches chaudes
1942	Le miel nectar
1942	Une journée à l'Exposition provinciale de Québec
1946	Défrichement motorisé
1946	Le percheron
1947	Le lin du Canada
1947	Congrès marial d'Ottawa
1949	La chimie et la pomme de terre
1949	La culture de la betterave à sucre
1949	Les ennemis de la pomme de terre
1950	Les ailes sur la Gaspésie
1950	Congrès marial Ottawa juin 1947
1950	Ski à Québec
1950	Sucre d'érable et coopération
1951	Les routes du Québec
1951	Le tabac jaune du Québec
1951	Jeunesse rurale
1951	Le cinquantenaire des caisses populaires
1954	Marguerite Bourgeoys
1955	Vers la compétence
1955	Waconichi
1956	Îles de la Madeleine
1957	Au royaume du Saguenay
1957	La Gaspésie pittoresque
1958	Penser avant de dépenser
1959	Médecine d'aujourd'hui
1959	Le bas du Saint-Laurent
1960	La béatification de la Mère d'Youville
1960	Film politique de Roméo Lorrain
1961	La culture maraîchère en évolution
