= Service de ciné-photographie provincial =

Quebec governmental film producer and distributor

- Abbreviation: SCP
- Successor: Office du film de la province de Québec
- Formation: 1940 (unofficially); June 5, 1941; 85 years ago
- Dissolved: April 27, 1961; 65 years ago
- Purpose: Film producer and distributor
- Headquarters: Quebec City, Quebec, Canada
- Members: 53 (1952)
- Official language: French

The Service de ciné-photographie provincial (lit. 'Provincial Service of cine-photography') was a Québec film producer and distributor active from 1941 to 1961. It was part of the Government of Québec.

== History ==
The Service de ciné-photographie provincial (SCP) was officially created by an Order in Council of 5 June 1941 under the government of Adélard Godbout. The various cinematographic services of Québec's ministries were thus centralized in one organization. (Note: The centralization process would finish around 1945.) It had existed unofficially since September 1940, only a few months after the submission of a report by agronomist Joseph Morin that would spark the Service's creation.

The Service de ciné-photographie was attached to the department of the Executive Council of Quebec. The budget allocated to cinematographic services now had to be voted separately by the Parliament instead of receiving a portion of each ministry's allocated budget. The SCP received $50 000 per year from the Godbout government in its two first years of operation. From the start the SCP owned a head office in Québec and an office in Montréal, which operated in western Québec.

The SCP was temporarily endangered after the Union Nationale's ascension to power in 1944 due to its director Joseph Morin's association with Godbout, but Duplessis was convinced of the Service's utility by Maurice Proulx.

After Bill 35 passed on 17 April 1946, the Service de ciné-photographie went under the authority of the Office provincial de publicité. The SCP was now to participate in OPP's goal of tourism advertising. The Union Nationale would repeatedly attempt to remove Joseph Morin and his allies from their positions. The government would communicate with the director of the Section de la cinémathèque Alphonse Proulx instead of with Joseph Morin.

Thanks to the SCP's small size, a climate of collegiality, trust and loyalty prevailed. Decisions were often taken collectively.

On 27 April 1961 the Office provincial de publicité was split into two independent organizations by the Loi modifiant la loi du Secrétariat. The Service de ciné-photographie became the Office du film de la province de Québec (OFQ).

== Production ==
The SCP's film production operations were relatively modest. It was headed by the Section de la production. Until 1944, practically all of SCP's production was photographic (not cinematographic) in nature. In 1942–1943, the SCP was only working on four films.

The Section's goal was to encourage filmmakers, and most films were made under contract by independent producers and filmmakers. Many pioneers of Quebec cinema thus emerged thanks to the SCP; notably, Albert Tessier, Maurice Proulx, Louis-Roger Lafleur, Jean Arsin, Fernand Guertin and Michel Vergnes. There were also in-house staff to help with various projects, such as making translations of technical films and making films for governmental organizations.

The SCP mainly worked on touristic films. It also worked on some films for governmental organizations. In 1958–1959, the SCP created 23 films, fully edited but without sound.

In 1944, the Section de la production was split into the Section de photography led by a photograph and cameraman and the Section de la production cinématographique led by a producer and a filmmaker.

The SCP rarely directly praised the government, but its films reflected the unionist ideas of progress and some film topics were imposed by political authorities.

In 1952, 10 out of 53 of the SCP's employees were assigned to cinematographic production.

== Distribution ==
SCP's distribution per fiscal year
	1940-1941	1942-1943
Films owned	240 (Note: In December 1941; not in the 1940-1941 fiscal year.)	600+
Screenings	1200	7500+
Projections	~5000	24 000+
Watchers	340 000	1 500 000+

The bulk of the SCP's activities were in film distribution, which was headed by the Section de la cinémathèque.

The SCP's film collection initially grew rapidly from donations and acquisitions. Films were obtained from the SCP's ministerial predecessors and from organizations such as the National Film Society of Canada and the National Film Board of Canada. Due to a lack of space in their offices, the SCP had to stop expanding their collection. The acquisition of new films was guided by professionals from ministries that would eventually borrow these films.

The Section de la cinémathèque's biggest client was the Department of Public Education. In 1942-1943 there were over 3200 screenings and 4600 projections (Note: Projections were inflated by repeated showings of films to the same classes . Many of these projections were also of "fixed view films"; the ancestor of the powerpoint presentation.) in education with around 400 000 watchers. Other important clients were the Ministry of Agriculture, the Ministry of Health and the Ministry of Lands and Forests. By late 1950s, the Department of Public Education, the Ministry of Transportation and Communications, the Ministry of health, the Ministry of Youth and the Office provinciale de la publicité were the SCP's main clients.

The SCP distributed films internationally. The SCP distributed films to an American audience in 1942, first with the Associated Screen News, then with a variety of local organizations (Note: Ex. University of Texas in Austin, Texas; Boston University in Boston, Massachusetts; Bureau of tourism of the province of Quebec in New York, New York.) from 1942-1943 onward. The SCP also gave films to the Canadian embassy in Paris in 1959; there were 194 projections with 24 700 watchers by early 1960.

The SCP worked with the National Film Board of Canada (NFB) for the Civic Education Film Campaign in 1943–1944, until it was cut off in late 1944 after tensions between the two organizations rose. These tensions were maintained, and the SCP obtained support from the Legislative Assembly on the grounds of provincial autonomy. They would fade in the post-war period, and the organizations would benefit from their mutual distribution networks. The NFB would eventually credit the SCP for the campaign's success in Quebec. These tensions would return in the 1950s, mainly for political reasons, and Duplessis forbade the SCP to buy and distribute films from the National Film Board of Canada. (Note: The ban would last until 1961.)

In 1948, the SCP was ranked one of the ten best cinematheques in North America by the American Cinematheques Association.

In 1952, 15 out of 53 of the SCP's employees were assigned to cinematographic distribution.

== Direction ==
Director of the Service de ciné-photographie

1941-1961 - Joseph Morin

Director of the Section de la cinémathèque

1941-19?? Alphonse Proulx

Director of the Section de la production

1941-19?? Paul Carpentier

Director of the Section de la photographie

1941-mid 1950s Maurice Montgrain

Mid 1950s-19?? Michel Vergnes
