= Saint-Jean River (La Pocatière) =

River in MRC L'Islet and Kamouraska in Quebec, Canada

- Location within Quebec
- Native name: Rivière Saint-Jean (French)

Location
- Country: Canada
- Province: Quebec
- Region: Chaudière-Appalaches, Bas-Saint-Laurent
- MRC: L'Islet Regional County Municipality, Kamouraska Regional County Municipality

Physical characteristics
- Source: Lake Litalien
  - location: Sainte-Louise
  - coordinates: 47.28139°N 70.01472°W
  - elevation: 291 metres (955 ft)
- Mouth: St. Lawrence River
  - location: La Pocatière
  - coordinates: 47.39555°N 70.04388°W
  - elevation: 4 metres (13 ft)
- Length: 24.6 kilometres (15.3 mi)

Basin features
- Tributaries
  - left: (upstream) ruisseau des Prairies, décharge du lac de la Traverse
  - right: (upstream) ruisseau Dionne, ruisseau Guy-Lemieux, cours d'eau Bard-Drapeau, cours d'eau Chrétien, décharge du lac Ti-Pierre, cours d'eau Blanchet

The Saint-Jean River (in French: rivière Saint-Jean) flows through the municipalities of Sainte-Louise (MRC of L'Islet Regional County Municipality), as well as La Pocatière, in the Kamouraska Regional County Municipality, in the administrative region of Bas-Saint-Laurent, in Quebec, in Canada.

== Toponymy ==
The toponym Rivière Saint-Jean was formalized on December 5, 1968, by the Commission de toponymie du Québec.

== See also ==
- List of rivers of Quebec
