= Petit-Lac-Sainte-Anne =

- Unorganized territory
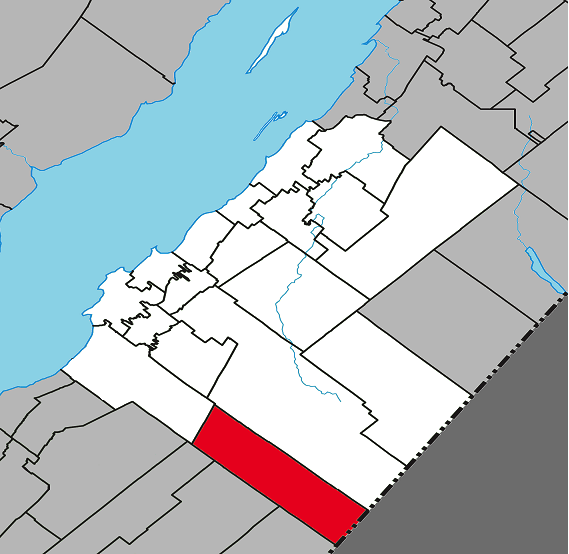
- Location within Kamouraska RCM.

- Location in eastern Quebec.
- Coordinates: 47°12′N 69°48′W
- Country: Canada
- Province: Quebec
- Region: Bas-Saint-Laurent
- RCM: Kamouraska

Government
  - Federal riding: Côte-du-Sud—Rivière-du-Loup—Kataskomiq—Témiscouata
  - Prov. riding: Côte-du-Sud

Area
  - Total: 188.60 km^{2} (72.82 sq mi)
  - Land: 191.80 km^{2} (74.05 sq mi)
- There is an apparent contradiction between two authoritative sources

Population (2011)
  - Total: 0
  - Density: 0/km^{2} (0/sq mi)
  - Pop 2006-2011: 0.0%
  - Dwellings: 1
- Time zone: UTC−5 (EST)
  - Summer (DST): UTC−4 (EDT)
- Highways: No major routes

Petit-Lac-Sainte-Anne (French pronunciation: [pəti lak sɛ̃t an]) is an unorganized territory in the Canadian province of Quebec, located in the Kamouraska Regional County Municipality.

== See also ==
- List of unorganized territories in Quebec
