= Jean Le Sueur =

Jean Le Sueur (French pronunciation: [ʒɑ̃ lə sɥœʁ]; c. 1598 – 29 November 1668), also known as Abbé Saint-Sauveur, was a priest from France who arrived at the colony of New France in 1634 on the same ship as Jean Bourdon.

The arrival of these two people is important to their history because a friendship developed that affected both their lives. Bourdon received a number of parcels of land as payments for various services. One, a fief that he named Saint-Jean, was given to him by Governor Charles de Montmagny in 1639 and he later built a chapel there for his friend, Abbé Le Sueur.

In 1650, Le Sueur moved to the site where the chapel was being built. It became the parish church for Sainte-Geneviève hill, under the ministry of Abbé Le Sueur, who also became the tutor to the Bourdon progeny. The chapel was even mentioned in a 1660 dispatch to the Holy See by Bishop Laval.
