= Saint-Onésime-d'Ixworth =

- Former municipality
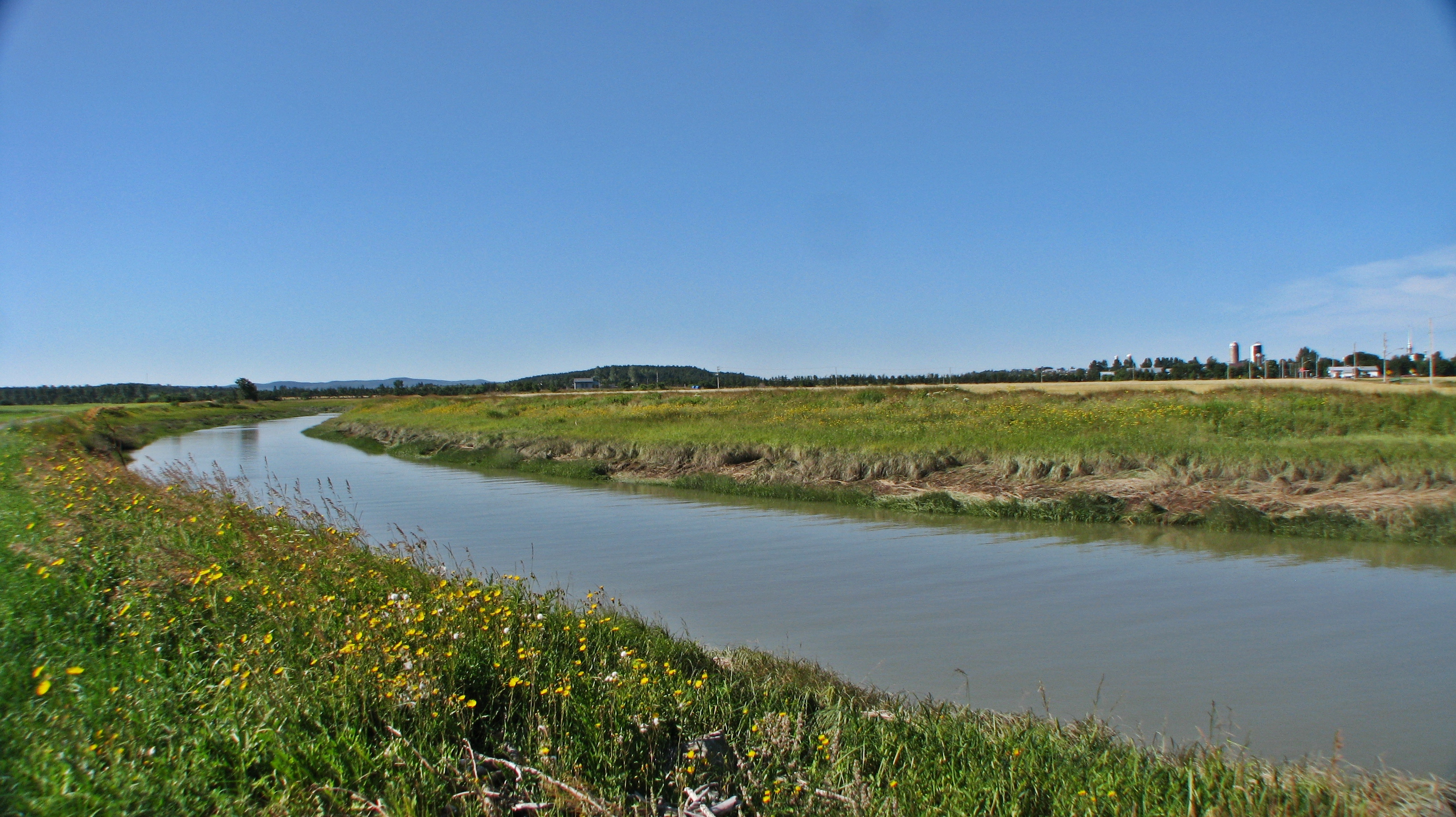

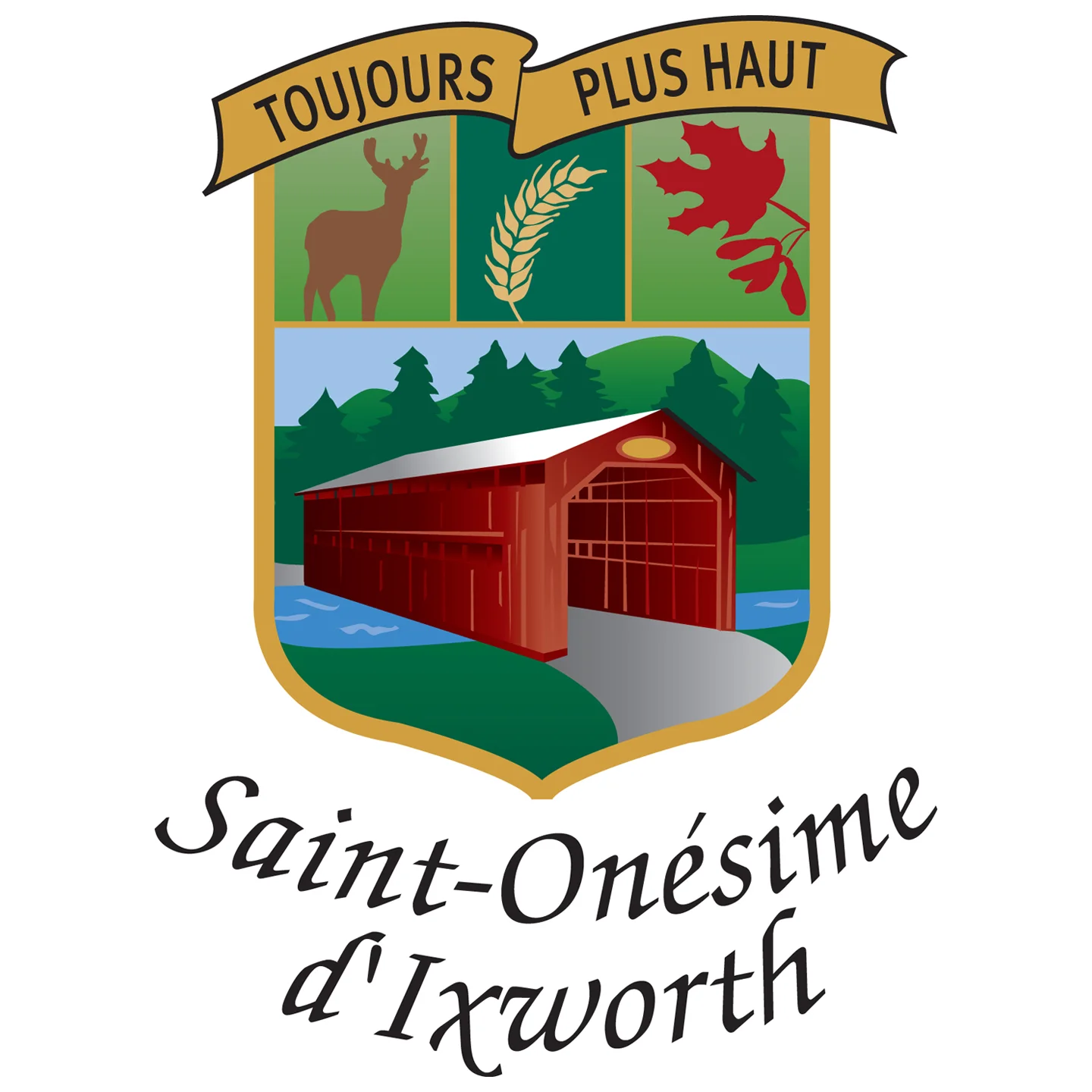
- Coat of arms

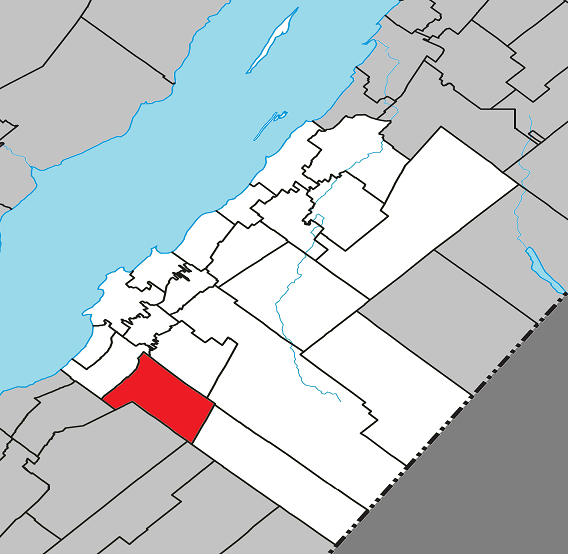
- Location within Kamouraska RCM

- Location in eastern Quebec
- Coordinates: 47°18′N 69°56′W
- Country: Canada
- Province: Quebec
- Region: Bas-Saint-Laurent
- RCM: Kamouraska
- City: La Pocatière
- Constituted: May 13, 1859
- Dissolved: September 3, 2025

Government
  - Federal riding: Côte-du-Sud—Rivière-du-Loup—Kataskomiq—Témiscouata
  - Prov. riding: Côte-du-Sud

Area
  - Total: 100.97 km^{2} (38.98 sq mi)
  - Land: 102.76 km^{2} (39.68 sq mi)
- There is an apparent contradiction between two authoritative sources

Population (2021)
  - Total: 522
  - Density: 5.1/km^{2} (13/sq mi)
  - Pop (2016-21): ▼6.8%
  - Dwellings: 305
- Time zone: UTC−5 (EST)
  - Summer (DST): UTC−4 (EDT)
- Postal code(s): G0R 3W0
- Area codes: 418, 581
- Highways: No major routes
- Website: www.st-onesime.ca

Saint-Onésime-d'Ixworth is a former municipality in the Canadian province of Quebec, that was located in the Kamouraska Regional County Municipality.

== History ==
Saint-Onésime-d'Ixworth was created in 1859 by separating from Sainte-Anne-de-la-Pocatière. In 2011 the status changed from a parish municipality to a regular municipality. In 2025 it was merged with La Pocatière and Sainte-Anne-de-la-Pocatière.

== Government ==
- Mayor: Benoît Pilotto
- Councillors: Dan Drapeau, Cathy Fontaine, Marie-Josée Hudon, Patrick Lavoie, Bertrand Ouellet, François Ouellet

== See also ==
- List of former municipalities in Quebec
