= Jean Bourdon =

French engineer and land-surveyor

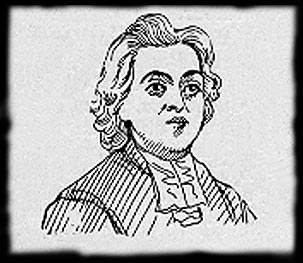
Jean Bourdon.

Jean Bourdon (French pronunciation: [ʒɑ̃ buʁdɔ̃]; c. 1601 – 1668) was the first engineer-in-chief and land-surveyor in the colony of New France, and the first attorney-general of the Conseil Superieur.

Bourdon came to New France in 1634 and he was designated as the engineer to Governor Charles de Montmagny. In 1639, the governor made a land grant to him of 50 acres (200,000 m^{2}) and, later, he built a mill. He also built a chapel on it for his friend, Jean Le Sueur. This was only one of several seigneuries that Bourdon received.
