= Tourville, Quebec =

Tourville
- Municipality
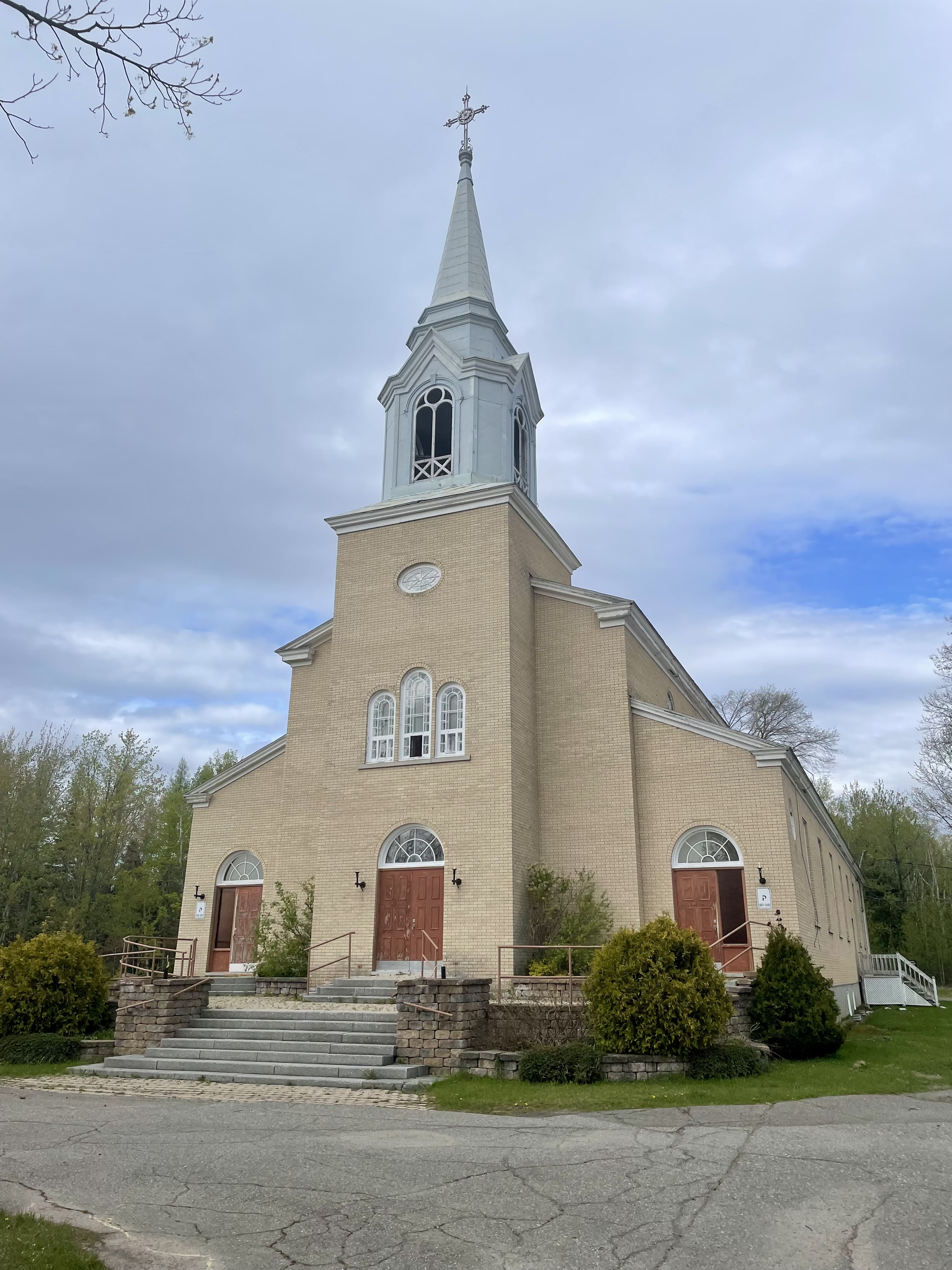
- Church of Tourville

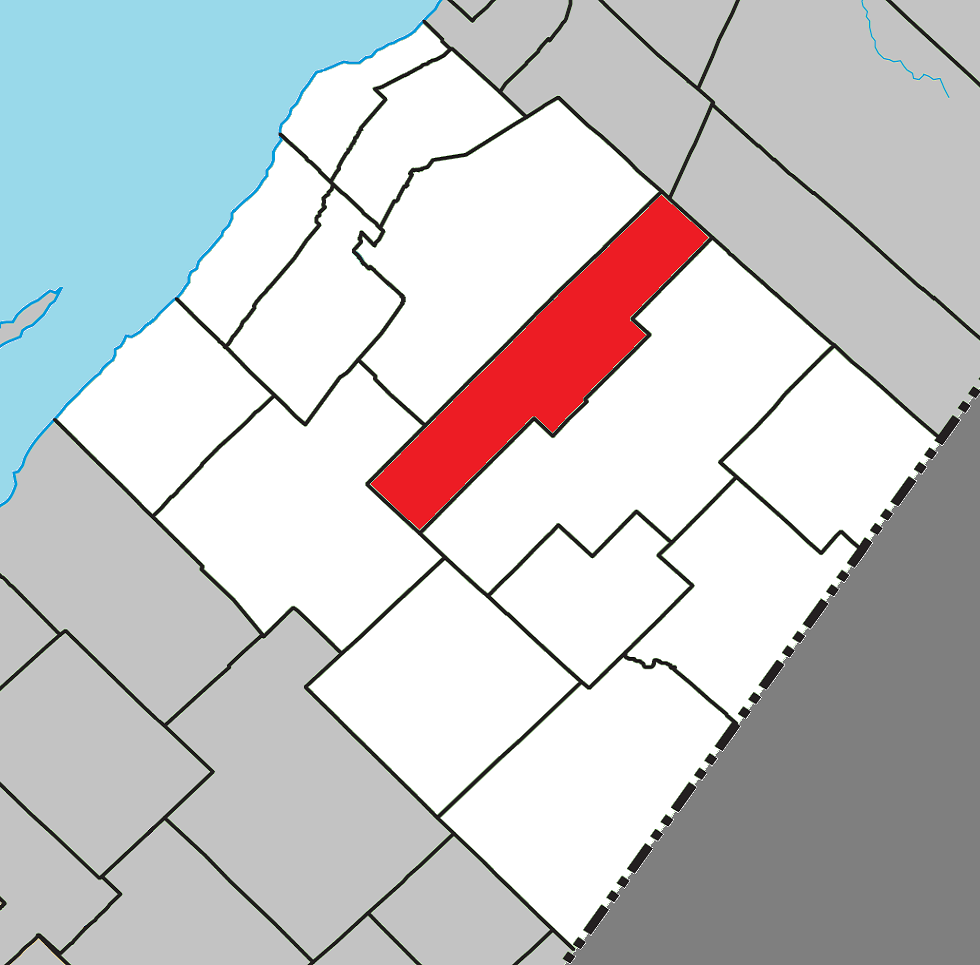
- Location within L'Islet RCM

- Location in southern Quebec
- Coordinates: 47°06′N 69°59′W
- Country: Canada
- Province: Quebec
- Region: Chaudière-Appalaches
- RCM: L'Islet
- Constituted: November 14, 1918

Government
  - Mayor: Benoit Dubé
  - Federal riding: Côte-du-Sud—Rivière-du-Loup—Kataskomiq—Témiscouata
  - Prov. riding: Côte-du-Sud

Area
  - Total: 165.10 km^{2} (63.75 sq mi)
  - Land: 164.36 km^{2} (63.46 sq mi)

Population (2021)
  - Total: 576
  - Density: 3.5/km^{2} (9.1/sq mi)
  - Pop 2016-2021: ▼2.2%
  - Dwellings: 337
- Time zone: UTC−5 (EST)
  - Summer (DST): UTC−4 (EDT)
- Postal code(s): G0R 4M0
- Area codes: 418 and 581
- Highways: R-204
- Website: www.muntourville.qc.ca

Tourville (French pronunciation: [tuʁvil]) is a municipality in the L'Islet RCM in Quebec, Canada. It is located in the Chaudière-Appalaches administrative region.

== History ==
The parish of Saint-Clément-de-Tourville, which served as a mission from 1913-1919, was officially founded in 1919 by an abbot named Bernard-Édouard Martin. The citizens wished to name it Martinville in his honour, but since there was another post office that had been established under this name, they opted for Tourville, which also honours Saint Martin of Tours.

A road to the village (today known as Route 204), was constructed between 1854 and 1859. At that time, the village had already been taking advantage of the abundant wood, particularly pine. In 1856, a farmer from Saint-Roch-des-Aulnaies settled near Black Lake and lowered its water level by digging an outlet in hopes of making a pasture. During winter, he would use a special shovel that caused the lake to rise once again, which protected the seeds from freezing. In 1858, construction began on sawmills along the Ouelle and Le Bras rivers.

Railroad construction took place between 1905 and 1915 which went on to run from the municipality of Charny to Edmundston. Two hotels had already been built to accommodate the travellers. A roundhouse was built, in addition to a carbon chute, a water reservoir, and a train station named in the honor of former Chief Justice of Lower Canada James Monk. The roundhouse eventually closed in 1954, and in 1958 was replaced by the Napoléon Gagnon sawmill which burned down in 1972. The train station was demolished in 1982 and its rails, as well as recreational vehicle trails, were removed. The population has since decreased to 698.

In 1918, Abbot Martin built a 2-story fishing cabin on the southern tip of the Lake Therrien lock. This area, then known as Beaubien, gave work to about sixty people to cut and drive logs along the river. For this reason, in 1923, Power Lumber became active, followed by La Rivière Ouelle Lumber's opening of a steam-powered saw to square the harvested logs in 1926. In 1927, the Canadian National Railway opened a sidetrack that would allow wood to be loaded without disrupting train traffic. Twenty-something families settled around the lake. In 1928, a school was at last built in Tourville. In 1939, the mill on the lake closed down.

== Demographics ==
=== Population ===
Canada census – Tourville community profile

	2021	2016	2011
Population	576 (-2.2% from 2016)	589 (-7.0% from 2011)	633 (-13.3% from 2006)
Land area	164.36 km^{2} (63.46 sq mi)	164.73 km^{2} (63.60 sq mi)	167.46 km^{2} (64.66 sq mi)
Population density	3.5/km^{2} (9.1/sq mi)	3.6/km^{2} (9.3/sq mi)	3.8/km^{2} (9.8/sq mi)
Median age	54.4 (M: 55.2, F: 53.2)	50.8 (M: 51.2, F: 49.7)	46.8 (M: 47.4, F: 46.2)
Private dwellings	337 (total) 281 (occupied)	341 (total) 277 (occupied)	349 (total)
Median household income	$51,200	$41,024	$42,363

References: 2021 2016 2011

Historical Census Data - Tourville, Quebec

Year	Pop.	±%
1921	766	—
1931	913	+19.2%
1941	1,076	+17.9%
1951	1,236	+14.9%
1956	1,350	+9.2%
1961	1,353	+0.2%

Year	Pop.	±%
1966	1,324	−2.1%
1971	1,205	−9.0%
1976	1,113	−7.6%
1981	962	−13.6%
1986	921	−4.3%
1991	834	−9.4%

Year	Pop.	±%
1996	800	−4.1%
2001	714	−10.8%
2006	730	+2.2%
2011	633	−13.3%
2016	589	−7.0%
2021	576	−2.2%

Source: Statistics Canada

== See also ==
- List of municipalities in Quebec
