= La Pocatière =

- City
- La Pocatière in 2026

- Coat of arms Logo
- Motto: Intellectum valde amo
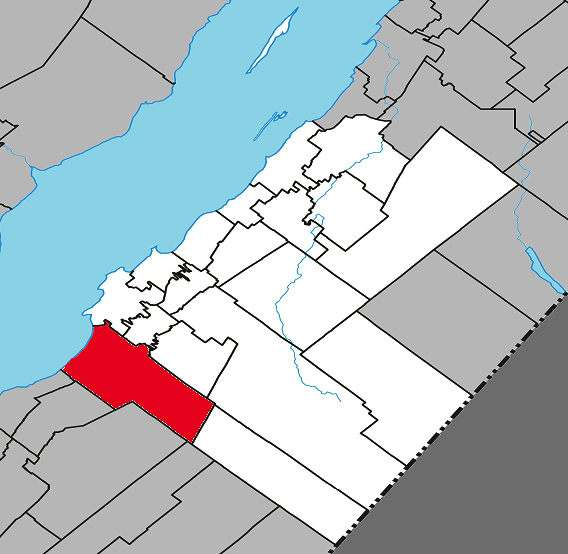
- Location within Kamouraska RCM

- Location in eastern Quebec La Pocatière (Canada)
- Coordinates: 47°22′N 70°02′W
- Country: Canada
- Province: Quebec
- Region: Bas-Saint-Laurent
- RCM: Kamouraska
- Settled: 1672
- Constituted: September 3, 2025

Government
  - Mayor: Vincent Bérubé
  - Federal riding: Côte-du-Sud—Rivière-du-Loup—Kataskomiq—Témiscouata
  - Prov. riding: Côte-du-Sud

Area
  - City: 202.05 km^{2} (78.01 sq mi)
  - Land: 178.72 km^{2} (69.00 sq mi)
  - Urban: 5.22 km^{2} (2.02 sq mi)

Population (2021)
  - City: 6,197
  - Density: 34.7/km^{2} (90/sq mi)
  - Urban: 3,921
  - Urban density: 751/km^{2} (1,950/sq mi)
  - Pop 2016-2021: ▼1.9%
  - Dwellings: 3,223
- Demonyms: Pocatois, Pocatoise
- Time zone: UTC−5 (EST)
  - Summer (DST): UTC−4 (EDT)
- Postal code(s): G0R 1Z0; G0R 2A0; G0R 3W0
- Area codes: 418 and 581
- Highways A-20 (TCH): R-132; R-230
- Website: www.lapocatiere.ca

La Pocatière (French pronunciation: [la pɔkatjɛʁ]) is a town in the Kamouraska Regional County Municipality in the Bas-Saint-Laurent region of Quebec, Canada. The town is listed as a Village rélais.

== History ==
The name La Pocatière refers to François Pollet de La Combe-Pocatière (c. 1630-1672).

In 2025, Sainte-Anne-de-la-Pocatière and Saint-Onésime-d'Ixworth were merged with La Pocatière.

== Geography ==
Located 130 km northeast of Quebec City, La Pocatière is the gateway to the Lower St. Lawrence region. Situated in the eastern Appalachian Mountains, the town of La Pocatière and its surroundings constitute the largest urban area between Montmagny and Rivière-du-Loup. The region offers an interesting geological feature: steep, isolated hills, known as monadnocks, which rise up from the plain. Montagne du Collège, located in the centre of the city, is one of these hills and offers a panoramic view of the region.

The Saint-Jean River flows through the municipality from southwest to northeast, where it empties into the estuary of St. Lawrence.

== Demographics ==
In the 2021 Census of Population conducted by Statistics Canada, La Pocatière had a population of 4,078 living in 1,981 of its 2,201 total private dwellings, a change of −1% from its 2016 population of 4,120. With a land area of 21.18 km^{2} (8.18 sq mi), it had a population density of 192.5/km^{2} (498.7/sq mi) in 2021.

Canada census – La Pocatière community profile

	2021	2016
Population	4,078 (-1.0% from 2016)	4,120 (-3.4% from 2011)
Land area	21.18 km^{2} (8.18 sq mi)	21.63 km^{2} (8.35 sq mi)
Population density	192.5/km^{2} (499/sq mi)	190.4/km^{2} (493/sq mi)
Median age	50.4 (M: 48.4, F: 52.8)	51.1 (M: 48.2, F: 53.4)
Private dwellings	2,201 (total)	2,155 (total)
Median household income	$56,800	$48,144

References: 2021 2016

== Economy ==
Alstom has a 51,135 square metres (550,410 sq ft) plant which manufactures subway and railway cars:

- R62A (New York City Subway car)
- New Technology Prototype R110B (New York City Subway car)
- R142 (New York City Subway car)
- R179 (New York City Subway car)
- Long Island Railroad and Metro-North Railroad M7/A cars
- Montreal Metro MR-73 and MPM-10
- Boston Red Line (MBTA) 1800-85 series cars
- MultiLevel Coach cars
- VIA Rail LRC (train) set
- shell for Toronto Transit Commission subway cars (T1 and TR) and streetcars (Flexity Outlook)

The plant was built in 1961 to build Moto-Ski snowmobiles and the plant was converted to railcars in 1971 (Bombardier continued to market Moto-Ski until 1985).

== Arts and culture ==
La Pocatière is home to the Musée François-Pilote, a museum of Quebec ethnology. The museum features exhibits on the history of agricultural education, a number of historical period rooms, stuffed bird and animal displays, and presentations on other aspects of local history.

== Attractions ==
Near the city are small isolated hills known as monadnocks. The Montagne du College-de-Sainte-Anne-de-la-Pocatière is 119 metres high.

== Government ==
City council consists of a mayor and six councillors:

As of 2024 the council consisted of:

- Mayor: Vincent Bérubé
- Councillors:
  - 1: Guillaume Dufour
  - 2: Émilie Dionne
  - 3: Marie-Claude Godin
  - 4: Mario Guignard
  - 5: Simon Fissette
  - 6: Steve Leclerc

== Education ==
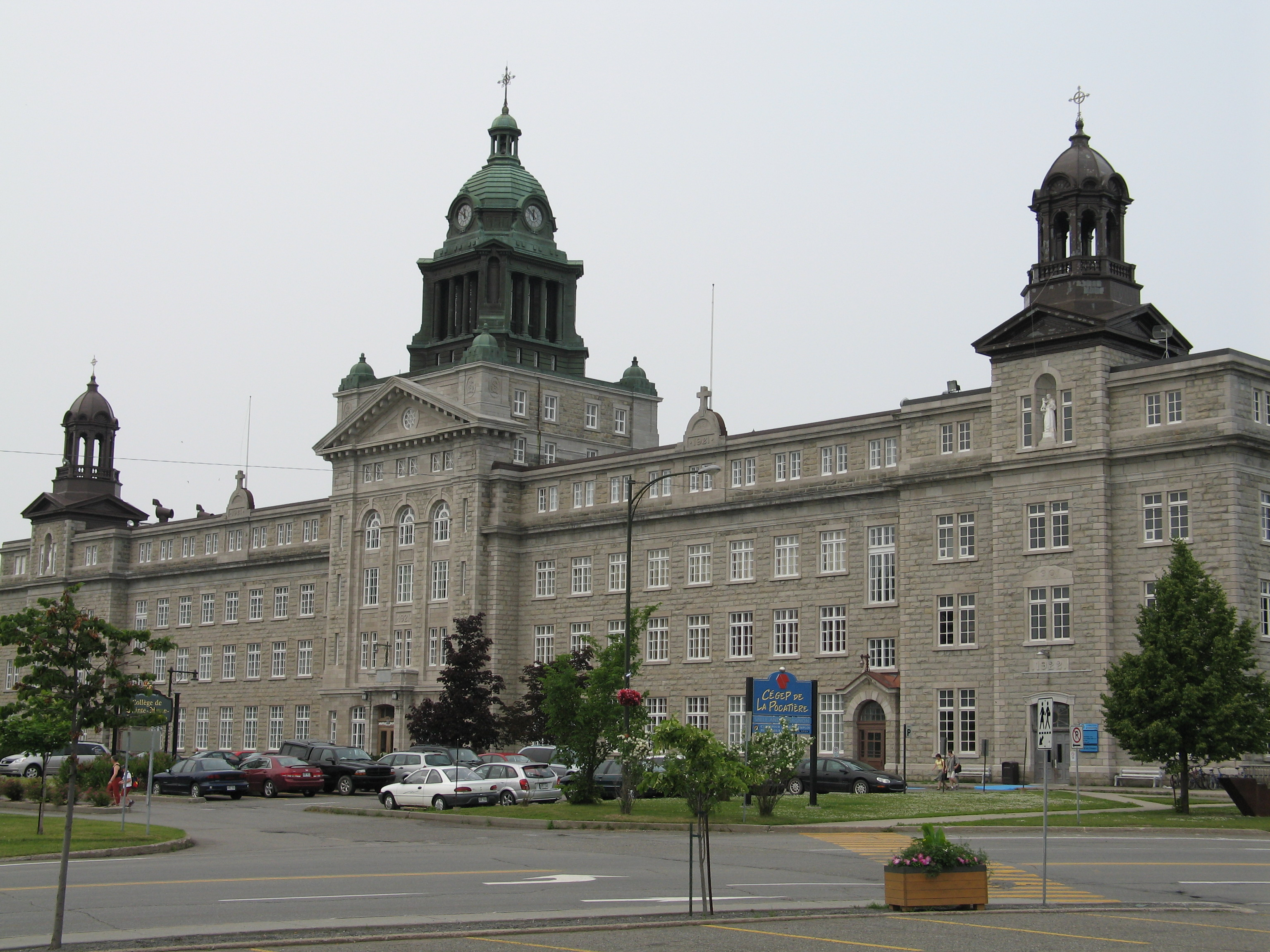
Cégep de La Pocatière

There are three post-secondary institutions in La Pocatière:

- Collège de Sainte-Anne-de-la-Pocatière - c. 1827
- Cégep de La Pocatière c. 1967
- Institut de technologie agroalimentaire - agro-food technology institute with focus on equines (horses) at the La Pocatière campus

The town has three public schools under the Commission scolaire de Kamouraska—Rivière-du-Loup:

- École Sacré-Coeur - elementary school
- École Polyvalente La Pocatière - secondary school
- Éducation des adultes - adult learning

== Sister cities ==
La Pocatière is twinned with:

- Coutances in France

== Notable people ==
- Hélène Alarie (1941-2023), politician
- Jean-François Caron, writer
- Bernard Généreux, politician
- Jean-Guy Hudon, politician
- Jean-Marie Pelletier, politician

== See also ==
- List of municipalities in Quebec
