= Saint-Damase-de-L'Islet =

- Municipality
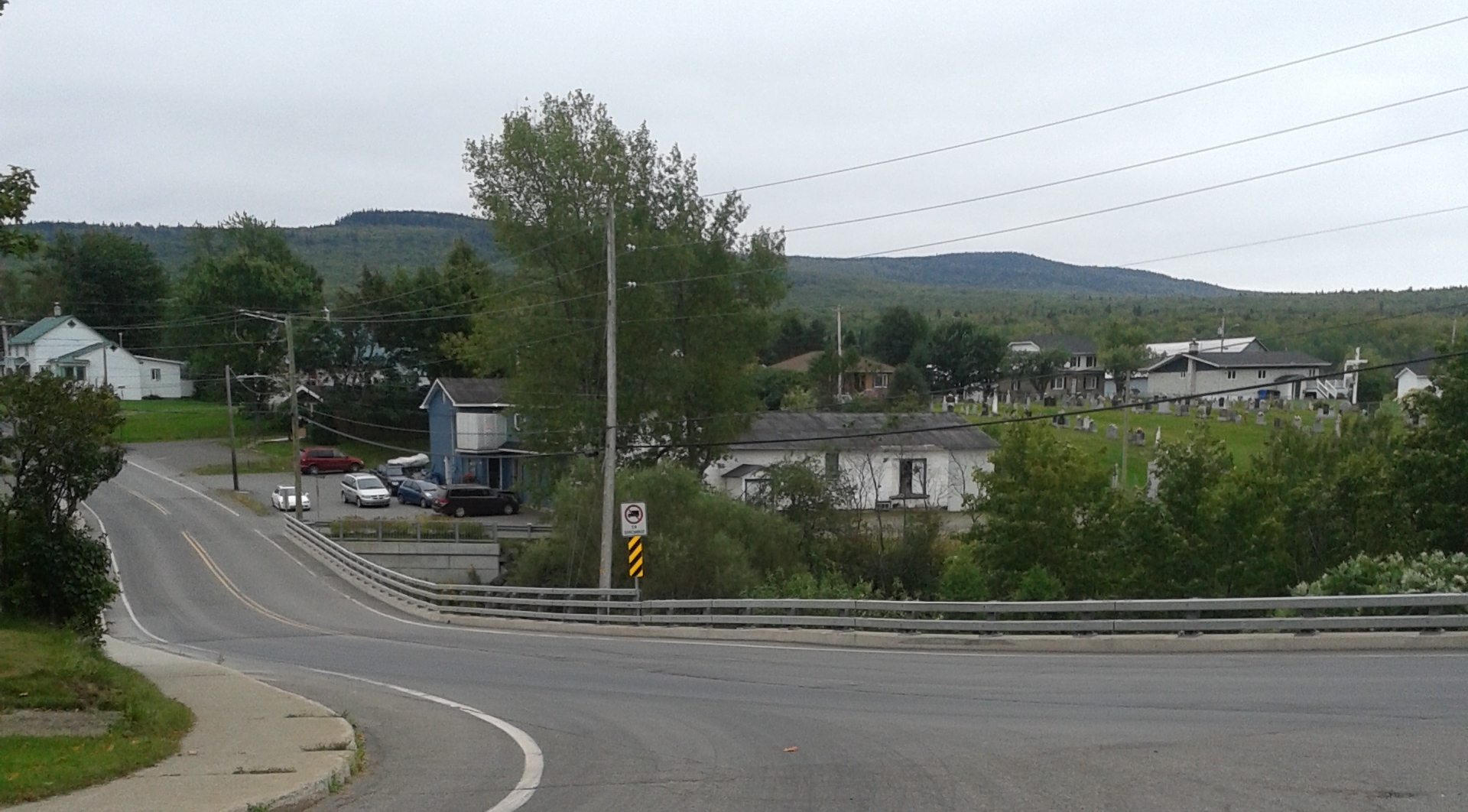

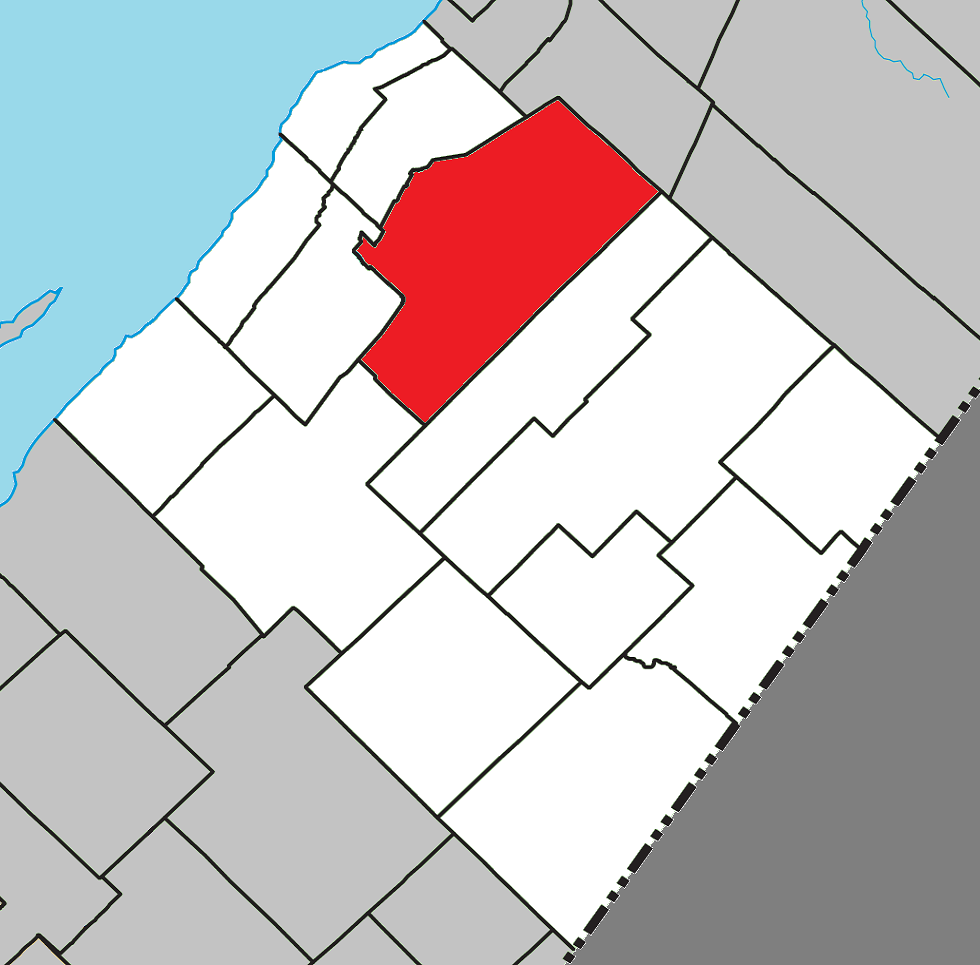
- Location within L'Islet RCM

- Location in southern Quebec
- Coordinates: 47°12′N 70°08′W
- Country: Canada
- Province: Quebec
- Region: Chaudière-Appalaches
- RCM: L'Islet
- Constituted: November 9, 1898

Government
  - Mayor: Anne Caron
  - Federal riding: Côte-du-Sud—Rivière-du-Loup—Kataskomiq—Témiscouata
  - Prov. riding: Côte-du-Sud

Area
  - Total: 249.60 km^{2} (96.37 sq mi)
  - Land: 247.64 km^{2} (95.61 sq mi)

Population (2021)
  - Total: 563
  - Density: 2.3/km^{2} (6.0/sq mi)
  - Pop 2016-2021: ▲2.3%
  - Dwellings: 321
- Time zone: UTC−5 (EST)
  - Summer (DST): UTC−4 (EDT)
- Postal code(s): G0R 2X0
- Area codes: 418 and 581
- Highways: R-204
- Website: www.saintdamasedelislet.com

Saint-Damase-de-L'Islet (French pronunciation: [sɛ̃ damaz də lilɛ]) is a municipality in Quebec, Canada, with a population of about 600 people nestled in the Appalachian Mountains. It is located about 15 kilometres (9.3 mi) southeast of Saint-Jean-Port-Joli. It is named after the Pope Damasus I and Damase Ouellet (1826–1908), which is known as the pioneer of the town.

The town was first named "Municipalité du canton d'Ashford" in 1898 and got its current name in 1955.

It is known for its local Chicken Festival every September.

== History ==
Although the territory of Saint-Damase-de-L'Islet formed part of the former seigneury of Les Aulnaies during the New France era, its current name is a reference to the neighbouring seigneury of L'Islet, which was granted in 1677 to Geneviève Couillard by Frontenac, Governor-General of New France. The name derives from 'îlet', meaning 'rock surrounded by water' or 'small island'. In 1880, a Catholic mission named 'Mission du Cinquième-Rang' was founded there; this became Saint-Damase-des-Aulnaies in 1889, when the christian parish was established, and its canonical erection took place in 1924. Damase Ouellet was indeed one of the region's pioneers. His brother, Pierre Ouellet, had offered the local priest a place to stay so that he could celebrate Mass there between 1880 and 1885. However, Damase's name was preferred as he was the eldest and a neighbouring village was already called Saint-Pierre-de-la-Rivière-du-Sud.

The municipality was officially created in 1898 and it took the name Ashford, thus evoking the name of a British town. In 1918, the southern part seceded from Ashford to become Tourville. In 1955, the municipality's name was changed from Ashford to Saint-Damase-de-L'Islet in order to reflect both the history of the parish and its membership of the L'Islet Regional County Municipality (RCM).

Like many villages and towns in Quebec, Saint-Damase-de-L'Islet has its own local festival: a chicken festival is now held there every year.

== Geography ==
Saint-Damase-de-L'Islet is located near the south shore of the upper Estuary of St. Lawrence, in the Côte-du-Sud region, at the eastern border of the municipalities of Saint-Aubert and Saint-Cyrille-de-Lessard. The municipality of L'Islet, to the west, is located nearby.

=== Climate ===
Saint-Damase-de-L'Islet has a Humid continental climate (Dfb), characterized by four distinct seasons and large seasonal temperature differences, with warm to hot summers, and cold and snowy winters.

Climate data for Saint-Damase-de-L'Islet
Month	Jan	Feb	Mar	Apr	May	Jun	Jul	Aug	Sep	Oct	Nov	Dec	Year
Mean daily maximum °C (°F)	−6.2 (20.8)	−4.2 (24.4)	0.2 (32.4)	7.4 (45.3)	14.9 (58.8)	20.1 (68.2)	22.8 (73.0)	22.0 (71.6)	17.2 (63.0)	10.9 (51.6)	3.9 (39.0)	−2.5 (27.5)	8.9 (48.0)
Mean daily minimum °C (°F)	−15.0 (5.0)	−13.4 (7.9)	−8.0 (17.6)	−0.6 (30.9)	5.0 (41.0)	10.2 (50.4)	13.1 (55.6)	12.2 (54.0)	8.3 (46.9)	3.0 (37.4)	−2.9 (26.8)	−10.0 (14.0)	0.2 (32.3)
Average precipitation mm (inches)	71 (2.8)	58 (2.3)	68 (2.7)	70 (2.8)	91 (3.6)	91 (3.6)	91 (3.6)	88 (3.5)	82 (3.2)	78 (3.1)	78 (3.1)	67 (2.6)	933 (36.9)
Source: (Based on ILE AUX COUDRES weather station) Environment Canada

== See also ==
- List of anglophone communities in Quebec
- List of municipalities in Quebec
