= Sainte-Perpétue, Chaudière-Appalaches =

Sainte-Perpétue
- Municipality
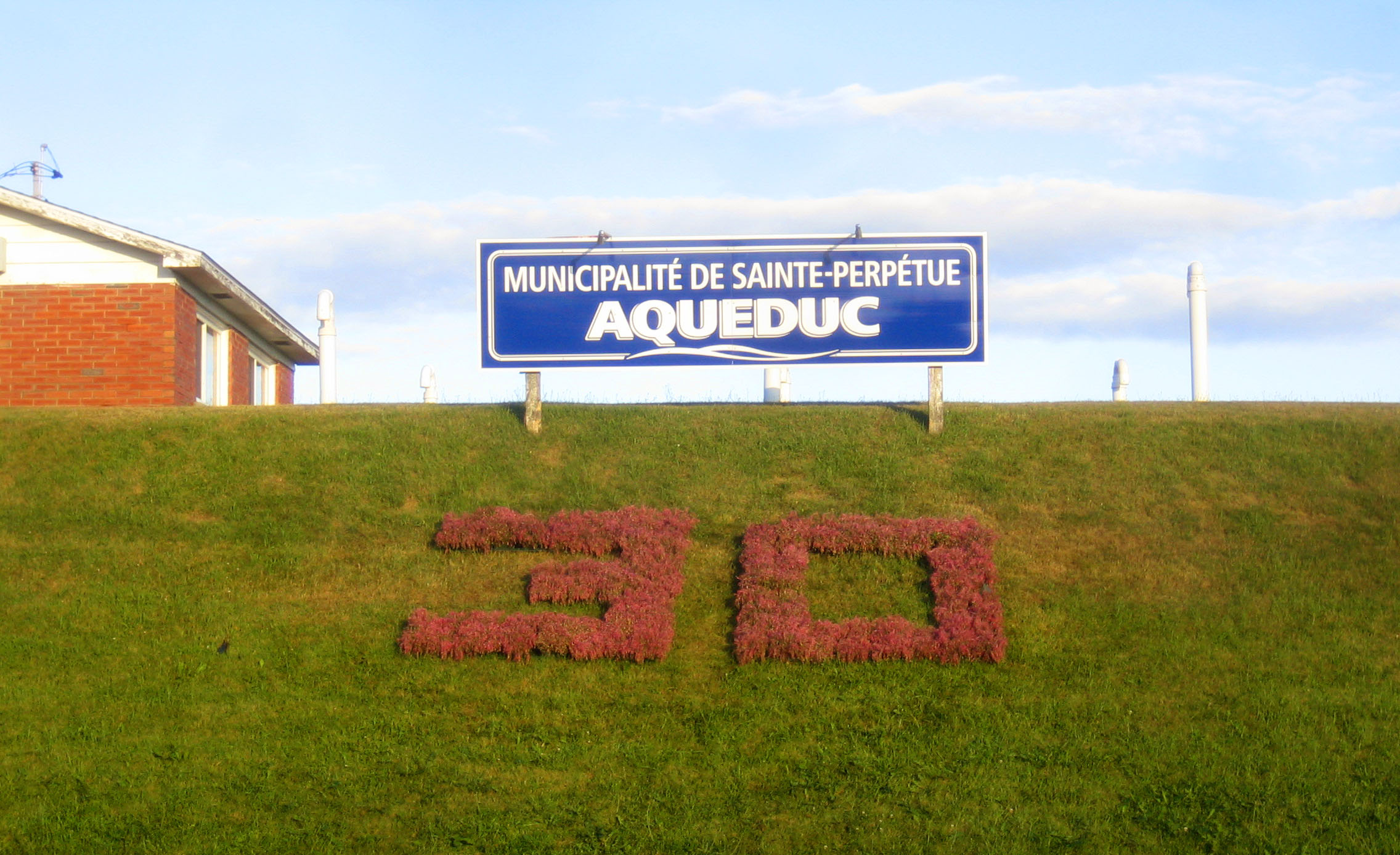
- Sainte-Perpétue Welcome sign

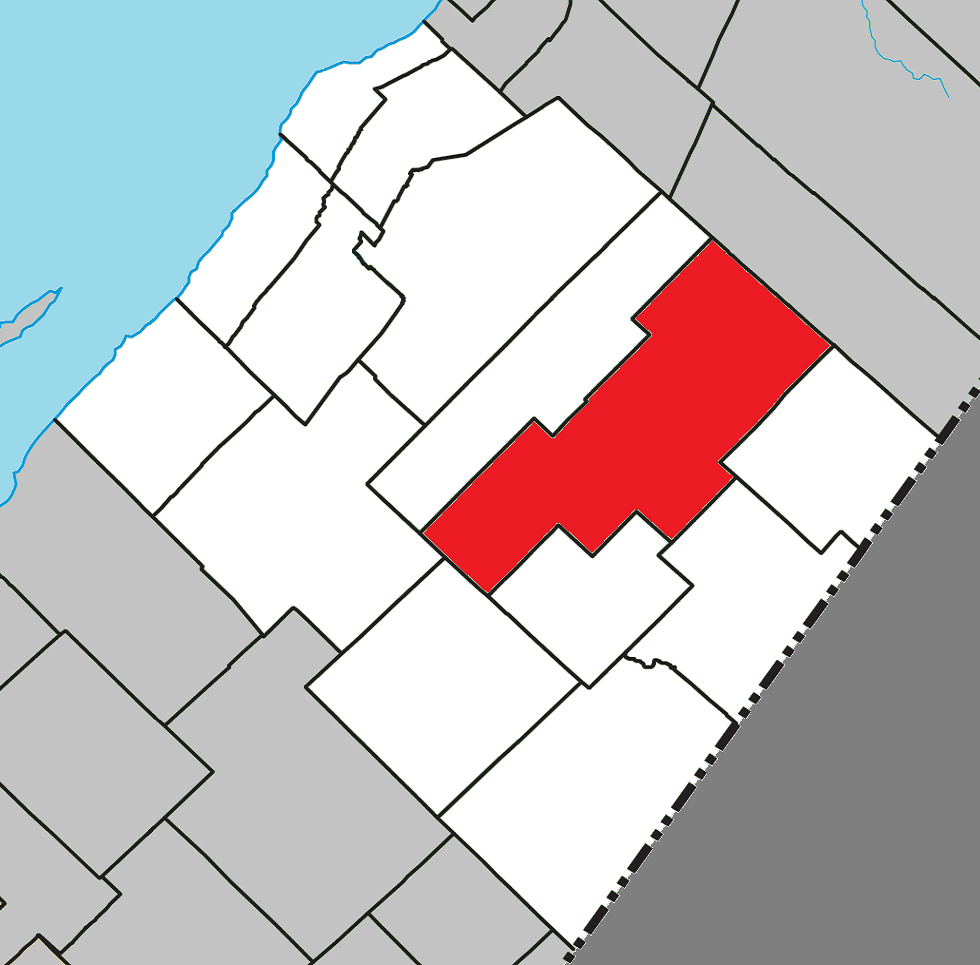
- Location within L'Islet RCM

- Location in southern Quebec
- Coordinates: 47°03′N 69°56′W
- Country: Canada
- Province: Quebec
- Region: Chaudière-Appalaches
- RCM: L'Islet
- Constituted: January 21, 1888

Government
  - Mayor: Daniel Robichaud
  - Federal riding: Côte-du-Sud—Rivière-du-Loup—Kataskomiq—Témiscouata
  - Prov. riding: Côte-du-Sud

Area
  - Total: 292.40 km^{2} (112.90 sq mi)
  - Land: 291.04 km^{2} (112.37 sq mi)

Population (2021)
  - Total: 1,715
  - Density: 5.9/km^{2} (15/sq mi)
  - Pop 2016-2021: ▲4.6%
  - Dwellings: 854
- Time zone: UTC−5 (EST)
  - Summer (DST): UTC−4 (EDT)
- Postal code(s): G0R 3Z0
- Area codes: 418 and 581
- Highways: R-204; R-216
- Website: www.sainteperpetue.com

Sainte-Perpétue (French pronunciation: [sɛ̃t pɛʁpety]) is a municipality in Quebec, Canada.

== History ==
From an administrative point of view, the first official action relating to the territory of Sainte-Perpétue, in the L’Islet region, dates back to 1862, with the creation of the municipality of Chemins-Elgin-et-Taché. The Chemin-Elgin sector, so named in honour of James Bruce, 8th Earl of Elgin, Governor of the United Province of Canada (1841–1854), was surveyed in 1852 by surveyor Charles-François Fournier along the boundaries of the townships of Ashford, LaFontaine and Dionne to the north-east, and Fournier, Garneau and Casgrain to the south-west.

As for the Taché sector, the intention was to pay tribute to the very promoter of the Taché Road project, Étienne-Paschal Taché (1795–1865), a doctor and politician; the plan was to use this municipality to link Dorchester County with Gaspé County, a distance of some 335 km across 22 townships. Subsequently, in 1888, the municipality of Sainte-Perpétue, which emerged from the division of the Chemins-Elgin-et-Taché into two separate municipalities (Saint-Pamphile and Sainte-Perpétue) was officially created. It was canonically established as a parish in 1918. In 1950, Sainte-Félicité was created from the southern section of Sainte-Perpétue and sections of Saint-Pamphile and Casgrain-et-Leverrier. In 1954, Saint-Omer was created from the eastern section of Sainte-Perpétue and sections of Saint-Pamphile.

== Geography ==
=== Climate ===
Climate data for Sainte-Perpétue, Quebec: 411 m (1981–2010 normals, extremes 1963–1991)
Month	Jan	Feb	Mar	Apr	May	Jun	Jul	Aug	Sep	Oct	Nov	Dec	Year
Record high °C (°F)	11.7 (53.1)	13.5 (56.3)	17.5 (63.5)	26.0 (78.8)	31.1 (88.0)	31.7 (89.1)	32.5 (90.5)	33.9 (93.0)	29.0 (84.2)	25.6 (78.1)	18.3 (64.9)	12.5 (54.5)	33.9 (93.0)
Mean daily maximum °C (°F)	−8.1 (17.4)	−5.5 (22.1)	−0.3 (31.5)	6.8 (44.2)	15.6 (60.1)	20.9 (69.6)	23.1 (73.6)	21.9 (71.4)	16.6 (61.9)	9.4 (48.9)	1.7 (35.1)	−4.6 (23.7)	8.1 (46.6)
Daily mean °C (°F)	−13.6 (7.5)	−11.3 (11.7)	−5.9 (21.4)	1.8 (35.2)	9.5 (49.1)	14.9 (58.8)	17.4 (63.3)	16.3 (61.3)	11.4 (52.5)	4.8 (40.6)	−2.2 (28.0)	−9.2 (15.4)	2.8 (37.1)
Mean daily minimum °C (°F)	−19.0 (−2.2)	−17.0 (1.4)	−11.5 (11.3)	−3.3 (26.1)	3.5 (38.3)	8.9 (48.0)	11.8 (53.2)	10.7 (51.3)	6.3 (43.3)	0.2 (32.4)	−6.1 (21.0)	−13.8 (7.2)	−2.5 (27.5)
Record low °C (°F)	−36.5 (−33.7)	−37.2 (−35.0)	−35.0 (−31.0)	−20.0 (−4.0)	−10.6 (12.9)	−1.5 (29.3)	2.5 (36.5)	−0.5 (31.1)	−4.5 (23.9)	−12.8 (9.0)	−24.5 (−12.1)	−37.2 (−35.0)	−37.2 (−35.0)
Average precipitation mm (inches)	91.7 (3.61)	81.2 (3.20)	90.6 (3.57)	93.3 (3.67)	103.6 (4.08)	102.1 (4.02)	123.5 (4.86)	122.1 (4.81)	115.1 (4.53)	99.4 (3.91)	96.9 (3.81)	99.3 (3.91)	1,218.8 (47.98)
Average snowfall cm (inches)	79.2 (31.2)	72.5 (28.5)	66.4 (26.1)	38.8 (15.3)	4.0 (1.6)	0.0 (0.0)	0.0 (0.0)	0.0 (0.0)	0.4 (0.2)	4.7 (1.9)	49.9 (19.6)	82.7 (32.6)	398.6 (157)
Average precipitation days (≥ 0.2 mm)	14.8	12.9	13.4	12.9	14.9	14.2	14.6	14.6	16.0	14.5	14.8	15.1	172.7
Average snowy days (≥ 0.2 cm)	13.7	11.9	10.8	5.7	0.9	0.0	0.0	0.0	0.0	1.4	8.5	13.0	65.9
Source 1: Ministère de l’Environnement
Source 2: Environment Canada (extremes & precip/snow)

== See also ==
- List of municipalities in Quebec
