= Otter River (Northwest Branch Saint John River tributary) =

River in Canada and the United States

Physical characteristics
- Source
  - location: Saint-Fabien-de-Panet, Quebec, Les Etchemins Regional County Municipality, Chaudière-Appalaches, Quebec
  - coordinates: 46°28′43″N 70°15′05″W
  - elevation: 400 metres (1,300 ft)
- Mouth
  - location: Township T11 R17 WELS, Aroostook County, Maine, United States
  - coordinates: 46°37′07″N 69°59′59″W
  - elevation: 336 metres (1,102 ft)
- Length: 14.9 kilometres (9.3 mi)

Basin features
- Tributaries
  - left: Ruisseau de la Dame à Proulx
  - right: (from the mouth) Sauvage brook, Lejeune brook, discharge of "Lac du Canard".

The Otter River (French: Rivière à la Loutre) is a tributary of the Northwest Branch Saint John River, flowing in Quebec (Canada) and in Maine (United States). This river crosses the following administrative territories:

- Les Etchemins Regional County Municipality in the administrative region of Chaudière-Appalaches, in South of Quebec, in Canada, crossing through the municipalities of Saint-Fabien-de-Panet, Quebec, Lac-Frontière, Quebec and Saint-Just-de-Bretenières, Quebec;
- Aroostook County (Maine), in United States: Township 11 Range 17 WELS.

The "Otter River" mostly flows Southeast into forest areas, in a small valley and crosses the Canada-US border.

== Geography ==
The "Otter Otter" rises between two mountains. This source is located at 4.3 kilometres (2.7 mi) Northeast from the village of Saint-Fabien-de-Panet, Quebec.

The "Otter River" flows over on 14.9 kilometres (9.3 mi) as is:

- 3.2 kilometres (2.0 mi) to the Southeast, to the road of Rang Saint-Jean-Baptiste;
- 2.3 kilometres (1.4 mi) to the Southwest, collecting the waters of the Lejeune creek (from the Southwest) up to the boundary of the municipality of Lac-Frontiere, Quebec;
- 1.8 kilometres (1.1 mi) to the Southeast in the municipality of Lac-Frontiere, Quebec, up to the Wild creek (from the Southwest);
- 0.4 kilometres (0.25 mi) to the West of the route 204
- 3.5 kilometres (2.2 mi) to the South, curving on 0.6 kilometres (0.37 mi) in Saint-Just-de-Bretenières, Quebec up to the "stream of Lady Proulx";
- 2.3 kilometres (1.4 mi) to the East, up to the Canada-US border;
- 1.4 kilometres (0.87 mi) to the Southeast in the Maine, up to the confluence of the river

The "River Otter" pours on the West bank of the Northwest Branch Saint John River. This confluence is located at:

- 2.5 kilometres (1.6 mi) upstream of the confluence of the Daaquam River;
- 10.5 kilometres (6.5 mi) downstream from the mouth of the Frontier Lake (Quebec-Maine).

From the confluence of "Otter River", the Northwest Branch Saint John River flows Southeast up to Saint John River (Bay of Fundy). It flows to the East and the Northeast, crossing the Maine, then East and Southeast through the New Brunswick. Finally, the current flows on the North bank of the Bay of Fundy which opens to the southwest on the Atlantic Ocean.

== Toponymy ==
The place name "Otter River" was formalized December 5, 1968, at the Commission de toponymie du Québec (Quebec Places Names Board).

== See also ==
Media related to Category: Otter River (Northwest Branch Saint John River at Wikimedia Commons

- List of rivers of Quebec
- List of rivers of Maine
