= Southwest Branch =

Southwest Branch may refer to:

Streams

- Southwest Branch Indian River, in Maine
- Southwest Branch Rancocas Creek, in New Jersey
- Southwest Branch Saint John River, in Maine and Quebec

== See also ==
- Little Southwest Branch Saint John River, in Maine
