= Northwest Branch =

Northwest Branch may refer to:

- Northwest Branch Anacostia River, in Maryland
- Northwest Branch Saint John River, in Maine
