= Sainte-Justine =

Sainte-Justine may refer to:

- Centre hospitalier universitaire Sainte-Justine, a Montreal hospital.
- Sainte-Justine, a municipality in Quebec
- Sainte-Justine-de-Newton, a municipality in Quebec
