= Sainte-Lucie-de-Beauregard =

- Municipality
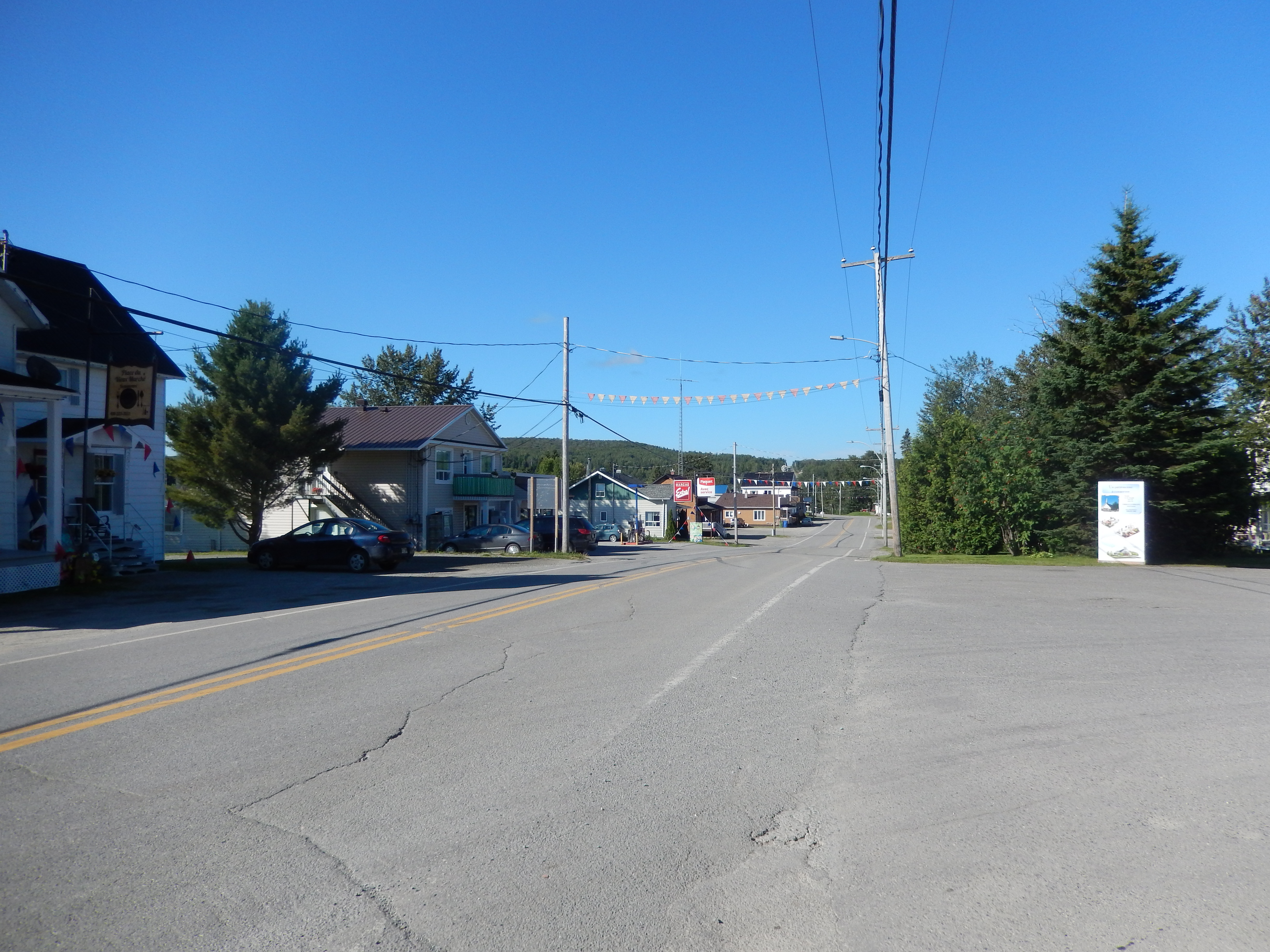

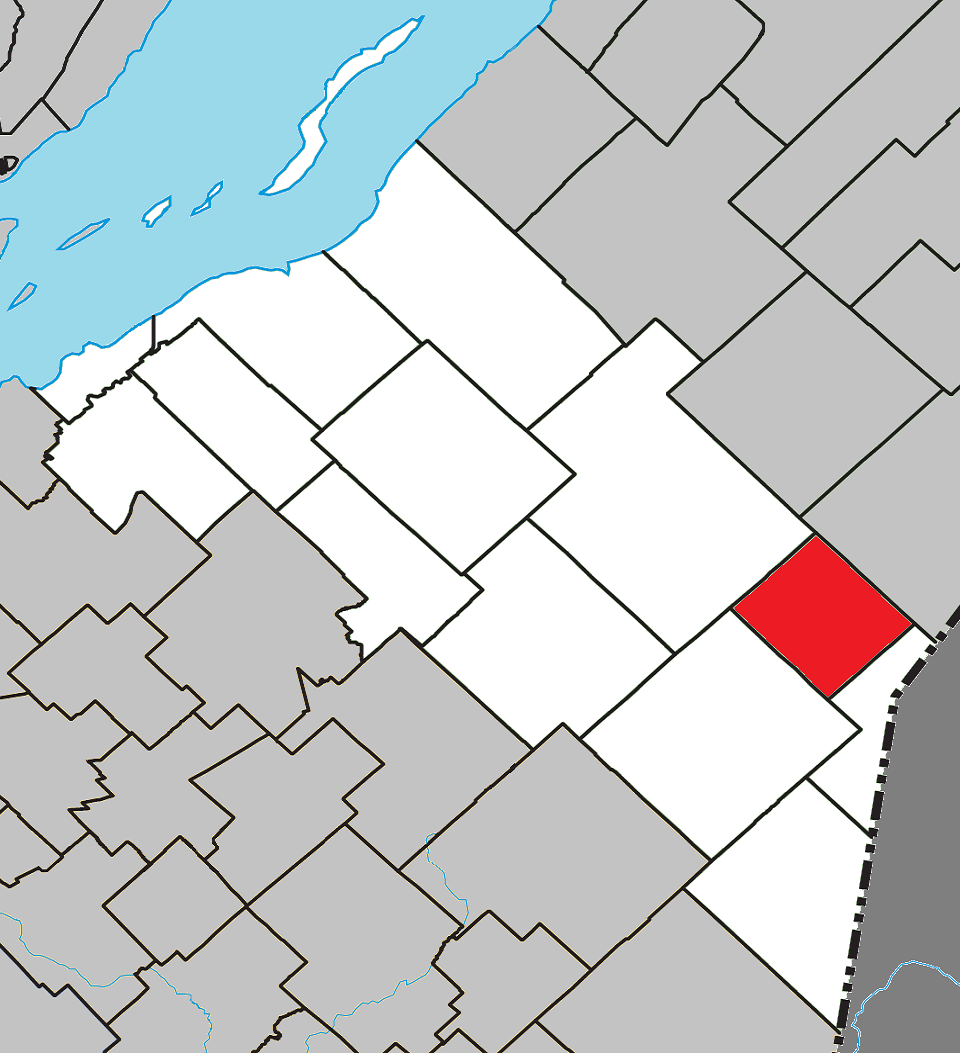
- Location within Montmagny RCM

- Location in southern Quebec
- Coordinates: 46°44′N 70°01′W
- Country: Canada
- Province: Quebec
- Region: Chaudière-Appalaches
- RCM: Montmagny
- Constituted: November 18, 1924

Government
  - Mayor: Louis Lachance
  - Federal riding: Côte-du-Sud—Rivière-du-Loup—Kataskomiq—Témiscouata
  - Prov. riding: Côte-du-Sud

Area
  - Total: 81.71 km^{2} (31.55 sq mi)
  - Land: 82.17 km^{2} (31.73 sq mi)
- There is an apparent contradiction between two authoritative sources.

Population (2021)
  - Total: 275
  - Density: 3.3/km^{2} (8.5/sq mi)
  - Pop (2016-21): ▼1.8%
  - Dwellings: 200
- Time zone: UTC−5 (EST)
  - Summer (DST): UTC−4 (EDT)
- Postal code(s): G0R 3L0
- Area codes: 418 and 581
- Highways: R-204
- Website: www.sainteluciedebeauregard.com

Sainte-Lucie-de-Beauregard (French pronunciation: [sɛ̃t lysi də boʁəɡaʁ]) is a municipality in Quebec, Canada.

== History ==
At the turn of the 20th century, the area now known as Sainte-Lucie-de-Beauregard began to attract settlers. Most pioneers arrived from Beauce and La Malbaie around 1905–1906, responding to the government’s offer of affordable arable land in the rugged Chaudière‑Appalaches region. In 1911, local families founded the mission of Sainte‑Lucie‑de‑Rivière‑Noire‑Nord‑Ouest in a forested valley along the Noire Nord‑Ouest River. Initially, the mission was served by the priest from nearby Saint‑Fabien‑de‑Panet.

By 1915, the community had petitioned for an official church. With the blessing of Cardinal Louis‑Nazaire Bégin, the parish was dedicated to Saint Lucia in honor of his mother, Lucie Paradis; the addition “Beauregard” commemorated his friend Marquis Costa de Beauregard, whom he had met in Rome. The first resident priest was installed in 1916, and civil governance began that same year with the formation of the township municipality of Talon‑Partie‑Sud‑Ouest, later modern-day Lac‑Frontière.

On 9 June 1924, the parish of Sainte-Lucie was canonically erected, and just a few months later on 18 November 1924, the civil municipality of Sainte-Lucie-de-Beauregard was officially established through separation from the township municipality.

The Société des Côtes‑du‑Talon had been erected earlier, in 1920, and its territory was carved out in part to form Sainte-Lucie. Over the years, the settlement gradually developed around its church and rural infrastructure. In 1946, residents founded their first caisse populaire, signaling local economic growth. Today, the municipality preserves elements of its rural heritage; including a notable covered bridge built in 1936, known as the pont des Défricheurs, which spans the Noire Nord‑Ouest River.

== See also ==
- L'Islet Regional County Municipality
- Big Black River (Saint John River), a river
- List of municipalities in Quebec
