= Frontier Lake (Quebec-Maine) =

Lake in Quebec, Canada

Lake Frontier
- Location within Quebec
- Location: Lac-Frontière, Montmagny, Chaudière-Appalaches, Quebec
- Coordinates: 46°42′24″N 70°00′04″W
- Primary inflows: Northwest Branch Black River
- Primary outflows: Northwest Branch Saint John River
- Basin countries: Canada
- Max. length: 1.8 kilometres (1.1 mi)
- Max. width: 0.7 kilometres (0.43 mi)
- Surface elevation: 347 metres (1,138 ft)
- Settlements: Lac-Frontière, Quebec

The Lake Frontier is a lake located entirely in the municipality of Lac-Frontière, Quebec in regional county municipality (RCM) Montmagny in the administrative region of Chaudière-Appalaches, in Quebec, in Canada.

From 1915, the small town South of the lake, called "Lac-Frontière" (English: Lake-Frontier), has had some development through the terminus of the Central Quebec railway.

In the nineteenth and twentieth centuries, the forest industry was the main economic activity of the region. Upon arrival of the railroad, the recreational and tourist vocation of the region has significantly developed.

== Geography ==
Frontier lake supplies water by its tributary the Northwest Black River (from the North) and the Creek Reservoir (from the West). The village in the municipality of Lac-Frontière, Quebec is located at South of the lake.

The mouth of Frontier Lake is located on Southeast bank of the lake at:

- 0.9 kilometres (0.56 mi) West of the Canada-US border;
- 0.5 kilometres (0.31 mi) North of the village center of Lac-Frontière, Quebec;
- 1.9 kilometres (1.2 mi) East of the summit of the "Montagne du Lac" (Mountain of the Lake) (elevation: 510 metres (1,670 ft));
- 4.4 kilometres (2.7 mi) Southeast from the village of Sainte-Lucie-de-Beauregard, Quebec.

== Toponymy ==
The choice of this place name is explained by its proximity to the US border. Established in 1842, this border in the Treaty of Webster-Ashburton, after lengthy negotiations between the British and the Americans.

Subsequently, the British set up camp on the banks of the lake, to accommodate their surveyors who went to topographic surveys in order to determine more precisely the border. At the same time, the inhabitants of the region of Montmagny had designated this expanse of water "English Lake", by associating it with the language of people who were there, both British Americans. Cartographic documents of the time translated this term as "English Lake"

The place name "Lake Frontier" was formalized as of December 5, 1968, at the Commission de toponymie du Québec (Quebec Names Board).

== See also ==
- Saint John River (Bay of Fundy)
