= Daaquam River =

Location
- Countries: Canada, United States
- States: Quebec (Canada); Maine (United States)

Physical characteristics
- Source
  - location: Ware Township, Lac-Etchemin, Les Etchemins Regional County Municipality, Chaudière-Appalaches, Quebec, Canada
  - coordinates: 46°23′20″N 70°27′34″W
  - elevation: 1,380 feet (420 m)
- Mouth
  - location: NW Branch Saint John River, Somerset County, Maine, Maine, United States
  - coordinates: 46°36′00″N 69°58′55″W
  - elevation: 1,090 feet (330 m)
- Length: about 3.6 kilometres (2.2 mi) in US and 45.0 kilometres (28.0 mi) in Canada

Basin features
- Tributaries
  - left: (from the mouth) in Quebec: Lavoie Branch, Nolet brook, Shidgel river, Black River (Daaquam River), Deer brook, Sauvage brook, Roche River, Blanchette brook.
  - right: (from the mouth) in Quebec: Charland brook, Rodrigue brook, Carter brook, Bédard brook, discharge of lake Henri-Maurice, discharge of lakes "à Garon", André-Chabot, discharge of Lac Théberge.

The Daaquam River (French: Rivière Daaquam) is a river primarily flowing in the administrative region of Chaudière-Appalaches, at South of Quebec in Canada and northern Maine, in United States. The river runs from its source (46°22′01″N 70°22′48″W), south of Sainte-Justine, northeast across the Canada–United States border to the Northwest Branch of the Saint John River in Maine.

Its current is flowing through:

- Les Etchemins Regional County Municipality (RCM): municipalities Lac-Etchemin, Quebec, Sainte-Justine, Quebec and Saint-Camille-de-Lellis, Quebec (forming the boundary of the townships of Daaquam and Bellechasse);
- Montmagny Regional County Municipality (RCM): municipality Saint-Just-de-Bretenières, Quebec (Panet Township);
- Aroostook County (Township T11 R17 WELS), in the state of Maine, the United States.

On the Canadian side, the Canadian Pacific Railway and Route 204 runs along the North side of the Daaquam river. The Daaquam river flows mostly in forest areas, crossing some agricultural areas. This river flows into the North East by gradually approaching the Canada-US border that it cross the boundary in the Township of Panet (in Quebec) and T11 R17 WELS Township (in Maine).

== Geography ==
=== Canadian side ===
The Daaquam river rises in Notre Dame Mountains, in the township of Ware in the municipality of Lac-Etchemin, Quebec, in Les Etchemins Regional County Municipality (RCM), in the administrative region of Chaudière-Appalaches in the south-central Quebec. This source is located at 6.5 kilometres (4.0 mi) southeast of Lake Etchemin, to 3.8 kilometres (2.4 mi) east of the center of the village of Sainte-Germaine-Station and 13.5 kilometres (8.4 mi) north-east of the Canada-US border.

The Daaquam River drains a small catchment in the Appalachian. The river runs through the municipality of Saint-Camille-de-Lellis, Quebec <! - Where it was dredged in several places leaving horseshoes -> and that of Saint-Just-de-Bretenières, Quebec where it has long served to drag because of the saw mills were located on both banks. A covered bridge (destroyed in 1960) crossing the river in the "Rue des Moulins".

From its source, the Daaquam river flows on 48.6 kilometres (30.2 mi) of which 45.0 kilometres (28.0 mi) in Quebec and 3.6 kilometres (2.2 mi) in Maine:

Upper course of river Daaquam (segment of 15.6 kilometres (9.7 mi))

- 4.0 kilometres (2.5 mi) to the North East in the township of Ware, forming a curve to the South, up to the limit of the township of Langevin;
- 0.9 kilometres (0.56 mi) Eastward up to the discharge la Lake Labonté (from the Southeast);
- 1.9 kilometres (1.2 mi) to the Northeast, up to the bridge of the road of the Church, linking Sainte-Justine, Quebec and Saint-Cyprien, Quebec;
- 4.4 kilometres (2.7 mi) to the Northeast, up to the discharge (from the South) of the Lakes Garon and André Chabot;
- 2.4 kilometres (1.5 mi) to the North, collecting the discharge from Lake Henry Maurice (from the Southeast), up to Blanchette Brook (from the North);
- 2.0 kilometres (1.2 mi) to the Northeast, up to the limit of Saint-Camille-de-Lellis, Quebec;

Middle course of river Daaquam (segment of 12.9 kilometres (8.0 mi)) Segment forming the boundary between Township Bellechasse and Township Daaquam.

- 1.6 kilometres (0.99 mi) to the Northeast, up to the confluence of the Roche River (from the West);
- 1.9 kilometres (1.2 mi) to the Northeast, up to Edmond-Blais road;
- 4.3 kilometres (2.7 mi) to the Northeast, up to the "route de la rivière Saint-Jean" (road of Saint John River), that she cut at 2.1 kilometres (1.3 mi) Southeast of Saint-Camille-de-Lellis's village;
- 5.1 kilometres (3.2 mi) to the Northeast, up to the confluence of the Black River (river Daaquam) (from the West);

Lower course of river Daaquam (segment 20.1 kilometres (12.5 mi))

- 2.6 kilometres (1.6 mi) to the Northeast, up to the limit of Saint-Just-de-Bretenières, Quebec (Panet Township);
- 2.5 kilometres (1.6 mi) to the Northeast, up to the stream of Carter (from the South);
- 3.4 kilometres (2.1 mi) to the Northeast, up to the confluence of the Shidgel River (from the North);
- 3.5 kilometres (2.2 mi) to the Northeast, cutting the Rue des Moulins, up to Nolet stream (from the North);
- 4.5 kilometres (2.8 mi) to the Northeast, passing South of the village of Daaquam up to the Canada-US border;

=== American side ===
After passing near the road of Daaquam (Quebec) village that led to the former village of Daaquam (Quebec), Daaquam river crosses the Canada-US border. In the Maine, it flows Eastward to empty into the Northwest Branch Saint John River (as designated in the Maine); this river segment is the continuity to the South of the Northwest Black River (French: "Rivière Noire Nord-Ouest") (as designated in Quebec). The latter constitutes the outlet of Lake Frontier located in Quebec. The Northwest Branch Saint John River proves to be a major tributary of the St. John River as to its confluence, it has an important rate as the confluence of the Southwest Branch Saint John River whose source comes from Saint-Zacharie in Southern Quebec.

== Toponymy ==
The river appears on survey cards since 1850. The name "Daaquam" is also linked to that of a township (1861), a village (1915), a post office (1916) and hamlet (Daaquam North), the last three located in the township of Panet. In a survey report in 1828, Joseph Bouchette designates this river under the Indian name "Mittaywanquam".

The place name "River Daaquam" was formalized on December 5, 1968, at the Commission de toponymie du Québec (Quebec Place Names Board).

== Floods ==
The river often floods in Spring but two were more destructive. The 1971 flood caused property damage. As for the 2008 flood, it caused to 250 000$CAN damage at the site of the Outfitter Daaquam (French: Pourvoirie Daaquam).

== See also ==
Media related to Category: Daaquam River at Wikimedia Commons

- Lac-Etchemin, Quebec, a municipality of Quebec
- Sainte-Justine, Quebec, a municipality of Quebec
- Saint-Camille-de-Lellis, Quebec, a municipality of Quebec
- Saint-Just-de-Bretenières, Quebec, a municipality of Quebec
- Aroostook County, a county of Maine
- Shidgel River, a stream of Quebec
- Black River (Daaquam River), a stream of Quebec
- Roche River, a stream of Quebec
- Northwest Branch Saint John River
- List of rivers of Maine
