= Little Southwest Branch Saint John River =

Location
- Country: United States
- State: Maine
- County: Somerset County, Maine

Physical characteristics
- Source
  - location: Mountain brook, Somerset County, Maine, Maine
  - coordinates: 46°07′34″N 70°11′37″W
  - elevation: 495 m (1,624 ft)
- Mouth
  - location: Southwest Branch Saint John River
  - coordinates: 46°07′34″N 70°11′37″W
  - elevation: 363 m (1,191 ft)
- Length: 46.5 km (28.9 mi)

Basin features
- Tributaries
  - left: Black brook

The Little Southwest Branch Saint John River is a tributary of Southwest Branch Saint John River, flowing on 46.5 kilometres (28.9 mi) in Somerset County, in North Maine Woods, in Maine, in United States.

From its source (46°07′34″N 70°11′39″W) in Maine Township 6, Range 19, WELS, it flows northward in a deep valley in forest area, a few miles east of the Canada–United States border to its mouth on South bank of the Southwest Branch Saint John River in T 9, R 18.

== Geography ==
The source of the "Little Southwest Branch Saint John River" is located in the Big SIX region, in Township 6, Range 19 Wels, in the Somerset County, Maine, in northern Maine. The upper part of the "Little Southwest Branch Saint John River" proves to be the continuity towards the North of the Valley "Middle Branch Norris Brook", a tributary of Norris Brook which in turn is a tributary of the Penobscot River.

The source of the "Little Saint John West River" is located at:

- 0.3 kilometres (0.19 mi) north of the border townships T6 R19 Wels and T5 R19 Wels;
- 3.4 kilometres (2.1 mi) east of the Canada-US border;
- 30.1 kilometres (18.7 mi) south of the confluence of the "Little Southwest Branch Saint John River".

From its source, the "Little Southwest Branch Saint John River" runs on 46.5 kilometres (28.9 mi), in these segments:

- 8.2 kilometres (5.1 mi) north, in a valley collecting the waters of four mountain streams, up to Black Creek (coming from the West);
- 7.9 kilometres (4.9 mi) north, passing under a bridge of a forest road and cutting the limit of Township T7 R19 Wels, up to a stream (coming from the West);
- 11.0 kilometres (6.8 mi) north, meandering in a plain up to limit of township T8 R19 Wels;
- 4.7 kilometres (2.9 mi) to the northeast, passing under a bridge of a forest road at the end of the segment, up to limit of the township T8 R18 Wels;
- 10.5 kilometres (6.5 mi) to the northeast, up to the limit of township R18 T9 Wels;
- 4.2 kilometres (2.6 mi) (or 1.9 kilometres (1.2 mi) in direct line) to the northeast, meandering in a marsh area up to the confluence of the river.

"Little Southwest Branch Saint John River" flows on the south bank of the Southwest Branch Saint John River, which forms the border between Canada (Quebec) and United States (Maine) in this area.

== Toponymy ==
The place name "Little Southwest Branch Saint John River" derives from the name of the main river designated Southwest Branch Saint John River.

== See also ==
Media related to Category:Little Saint John South-West River at Wikimedia Commons

- Somerset County, Maine
- Southwest Branch Saint John River, river of Quebec and Maine
- List of rivers of Maine
