= Sainte-Justine, Quebec =

Sainte-Justine
- Municipality
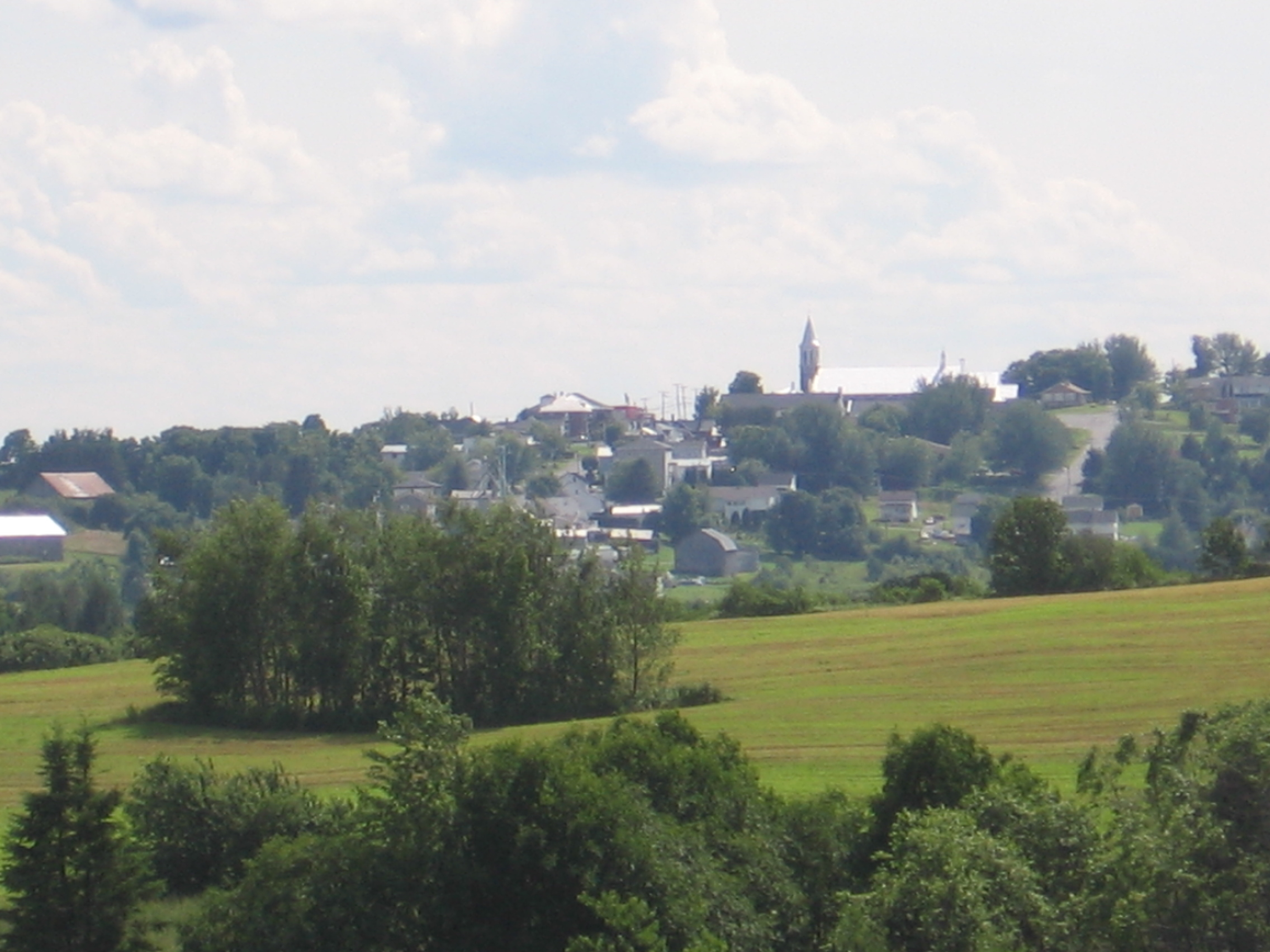

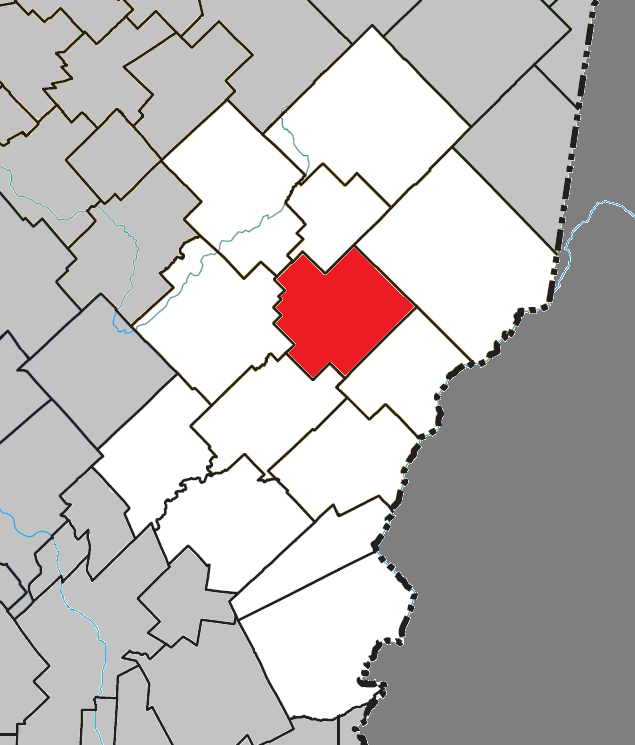
- Location within Les Etchemins RCM

- Location in southern Quebec
- Coordinates: 46°24′N 70°21′W
- Country: Canada
- Province: Quebec
- Region: Chaudière-Appalaches
- RCM: Les Etchemins
- Constituted: January 1, 1870

Government
  - Mayor: Denis Beaulieu
  - Federal riding: Bellechasse—Les Etchemins—Lévis
  - Prov. riding: Bellechasse

Area
  - Total: 126.40 km^{2} (48.80 sq mi)
  - Land: 126.10 km^{2} (48.69 sq mi)

Population (2011)
  - Total: 1,845
  - Density: 14.6/km^{2} (38/sq mi)
  - Pop 2006-2011: ▲1.1%
  - Dwellings: 834
- Time zone: UTC−5 (EST)
  - Summer (DST): UTC−4 (EDT)
- Postal code(s): G0R 1Y0
- Area codes: 418 and 581
- Highways: R-204
- Website: www.stejustine.net

Sainte-Justine (French pronunciation: [sɛ̃t ʒystin]) is a municipality in the Les Etchemins Regional County Municipality in Quebec, Canada. It is part of the Chaudière-Appalaches region and the population is 1,835 as of 2009. It is named after Marie-Justine Têtu, wife to Hector-Louis Langevin, member of Parliament for Dorchester.

It is home to a regional secondary school, Polyvalente des Appalaches.

The famous Canadian short story The Hockey Sweater takes place in Sainte-Justine, the hometown of the author, Roch Carrier.

== People linked to Sainte-Justine ==
- Roch Carrier, author
- Marius Cayouette, organist and composer
- Alex Tanguay, National Hockey League player

== See also ==
- Daaquam River, a stream
- Roche River (Daaquam River), a stream
- Onze River (Roche River), a stream
- Douze River (Roche River), a stream
- Moulin River (Roche River), a stream
- Famine River, a stream
- Les Etchemins Regional County Municipality (RCM)
- List of municipalities in Quebec
