= Saint-Just-de-Bretenières =

- Municipality
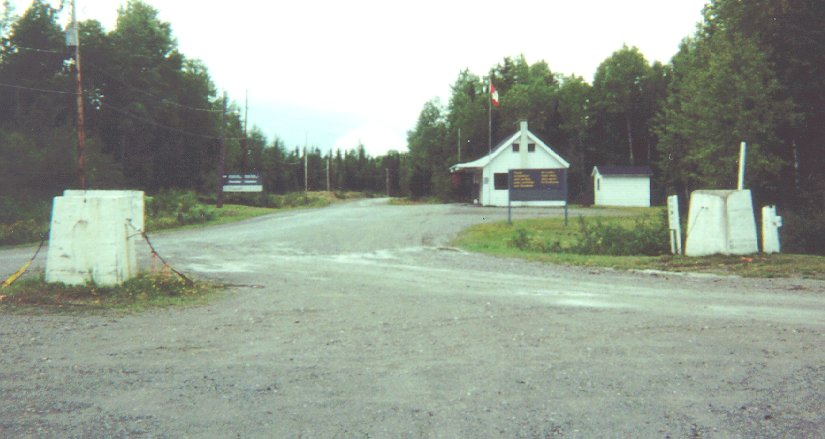

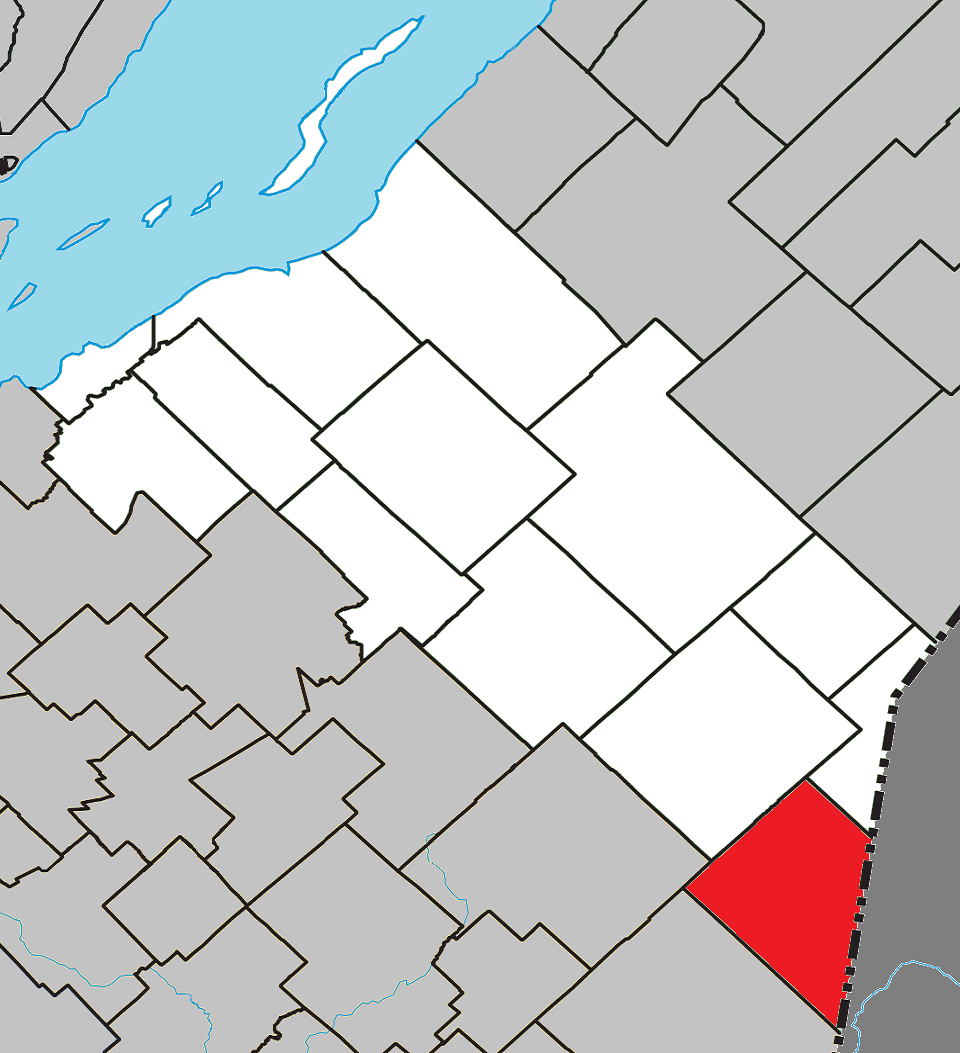
- Location within Montmagny RCM

- Location in province of Quebec
- Coordinates: 46°34′N 70°06′W
- Country: Canada
- Province: Quebec
- Region: Chaudière-Appalaches
- RCM: Montmagny
- Constituted: May 27, 1918

Government
  - Mayor: Donald Gilbert
  - Fed. riding: Côte-du-Sud—Rivière-du-Loup—Kataskomiq—Témiscouata
  - Prov. riding: Côte-du-Sud

Area
  - Total: 133.82 km^{2} (51.67 sq mi)
  - Land: 132.60 km^{2} (51.20 sq mi)

Population (2021)
  - Total: 639
  - Density: 5/km^{2} (13/sq mi)
  - Pop (2016-21): ▼4.3%
  - Dwellings: 412
- Time zone: UTC−5 (EST)
  - Summer (DST): UTC−4 (EDT)
- Postal code(s): G0R 3H0
- Area codes: 418 and 581
- Highways: R-204
- Website: www.saintjust debretenieres.com

Saint-Just-de-Bretenières is a municipality in Quebec, Canada. It is located on the Canada–United States border.

== See also ==
- Daaquam River
- List of municipalities in Quebec
