= Northwest Branch Saint John River =

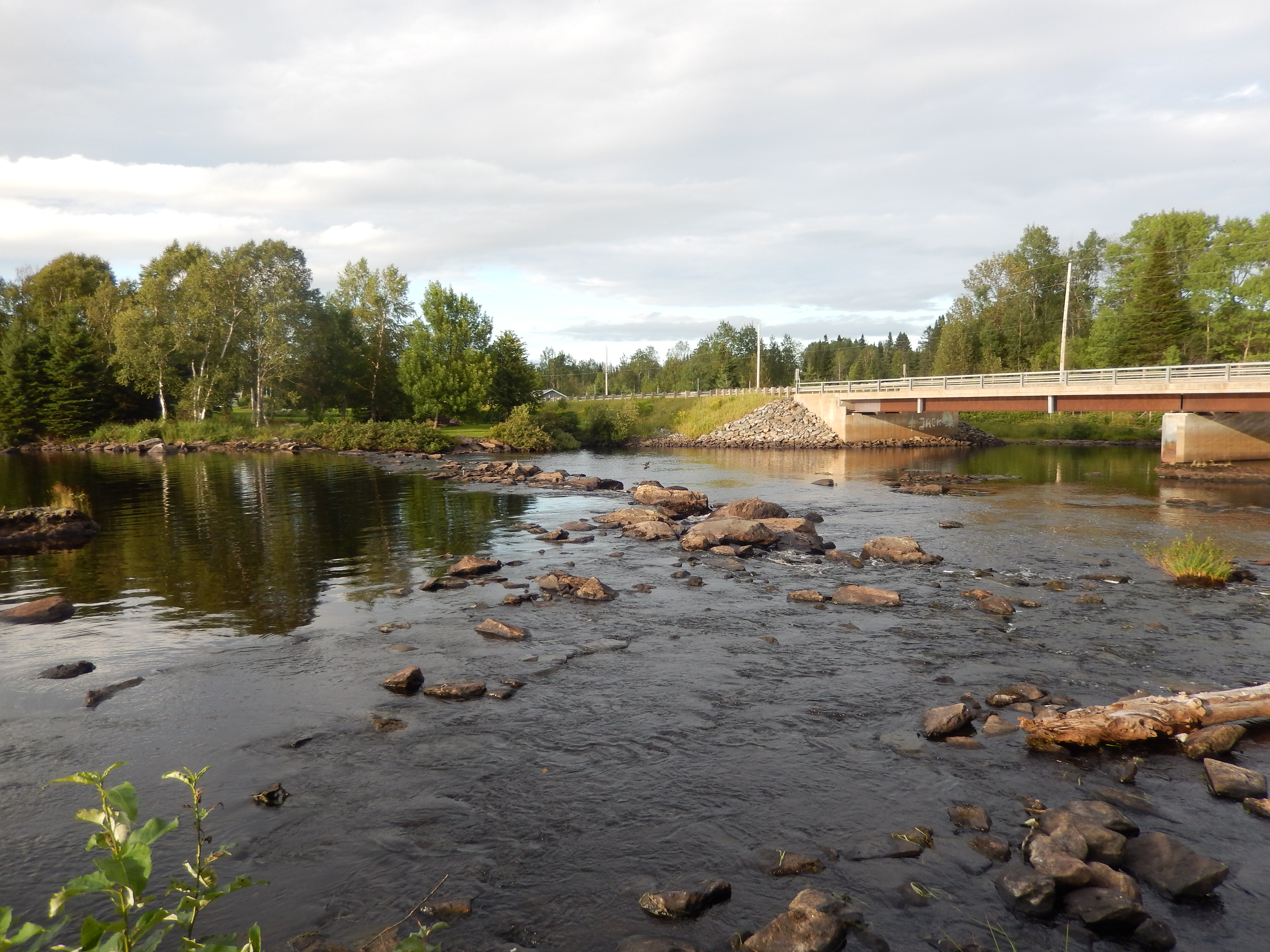
- Native name: Décharge du Lac Frontière (French)

Location
- Countries: Canada, United States
- States: Quebec, Maine
- Cities: Lac-Frontière, Quebec

Physical characteristics
- Source
  - location: Frontier Lake (Quebec-Maine), municipality of Lac-Frontière, Quebec, Montmagny Regional County Municipality, Quebec
  - coordinates: 46°42′05″N 69°59′55″W
  - elevation: 357 metres (1,171 ft)
- Mouth
  - location: Saint John River, Somerset County, Maine, Maine, United States
  - coordinates: 46°33′48″N 69°53′08″W
  - elevation: 318 metres (1,043 ft)
- Length: about 20.7 kilometres (12.9 mi)

Basin features
- Tributaries
  - left: (from the mouth) Oak Brook, Bean Brook, discharge of Beaver Pond.
  - right: (from the mouth) Eastman Brook, Daaquam River, Otter Brook (or "rivière à la Loutre" in Quebec).

The Northwest Branch Saint John River (French: Décharge du Lac Frontière) is a 15.5-mile-long (24.9 km) river primarily in Aroostook County, Maine, USA. Its origin (46°42′04″N 69°59′55″W) is Frontier Lake (Quebec-Maine) in Quebec, Canada. After crossing the Canada–United States border, the Northwest Branch runs south close to the border until it picks up its tributary, the Daaquam River, which also flows out of Canada. The Northwest Branch then runs generally eastward to its confluence with the Southwest Branch to form the Saint John River.

Has current flowing in:

- Montmagny Regional County Municipality (RCM): municipality of Lac-Frontière, Quebec;
- Aroostook County: (township T11 R17 WELS), in the state of Maine;
- Somerset County, Maine: (township T10 R17 WELS), in the state of Maine.

On the Canadian side, the road 283 runs along the Canada-US border on 6.4 kilometres (4.0 mi) and crosses the "Northwest Branch Saint John River" at the South East side of the Frontier Lake (Quebec-Maine).

On the US side, a road from Frontier Lake (Quebec-Maine) moves Eastward through the mountains. In addition, a road runs on the North bank on a river segment, downstream of the confluence of the Daaquam River and serves the township T11 R17 WELS in the North Maine Woods.

== Geography ==
The river segment of 1.1 kilometres (0.68 mi) between the bridge of the road 283 and the Canada-US border is considered an extension of Frontier Lake (Quebec-Maine). Consequently, the "Northwest Branch Saint John River" officially rises at the US border and not at the mouth of Frontière Lake in the municipality of Lac-Frontière, Quebec.

This source is located at 6.5 kilometres (4.0 mi) Southeast of Lac Etchemin and 13.5 kilometres (8.4 mi) Northeast of the Canada-US border.

From its source, the "Northwest Branch Saint John River" flows on 20.7 kilometres (12.9 mi) of which 1.1 kilometres (0.68 mi) in Quebec and 19.6 kilometres (12.2 mi) in the Maine:

Higher courses of Northwest Branch Saint John River (segment of 1.1 kilometres (0.68 mi) in Quebec)

- 1.1 kilometres (0.68 mi) to the South in the municipality of Lac-Frontière, Quebec, to the Canada-US border;

Intermediate Course of the Northwest Branch Saint John River (segment of 9.9 kilometres (6.2 mi) in Maine, up to the confluence of the Daaquam River)

- 3.9 kilometres (2.4 mi) to the Southeast, up to the limit of the township T12 R17 WELS;
- 5.5 kilometres (3.4 mi) to the South and the Southwest, up to the confluence of the Otter River (Northwest Branch Saint John River) (from the West), located in the township T11 R17 WELS;
- 2.5 kilometres (1.6 mi) to the Southeast, up to the confluence of the Daaquam River (from West);

Lower course of the Northwest Branch Saint John River (segment of 9.7 kilometres (6.0 mi) downstream of the confluence of the Daaquam River)

- 0.6 kilometres (0.37 mi) Eastward up to Bean Creek (from the North);
- 6.3 kilometres (3.9 mi) to Southeast, up to Oak Brook (from the North);
- 1.3 kilometres (0.81 mi) Southward forming a curve to the East, up to the boundary between Bellechasse Township and the Township of St. John West, to the limit of Somerset County, Maine;
- 1.5 kilometres (0.93 mi) to Southeast in the township of T10 R17 WELS Somerset County, Maine, up to the confluence of the river

"Northwest Branch Saint John River" flows on the Southwest bank of the Saint John River. This confluence is common with that of the Southwest Branch Saint John River (coming from South).

From the confluence of the Northwest Branch Saint-Jean River, the Saint John River flows Eastward and Northeast through Maine, then East and Southeast through New Brunswick. Finally, the current flows on the North bank of the Bay of Fundy which opens to the Southwest on the Atlantic Ocean.

== See also ==
- List of rivers of Maine
- List of rivers of Quebec
