= Saint-Camille-de-Lellis =

- Parish municipality
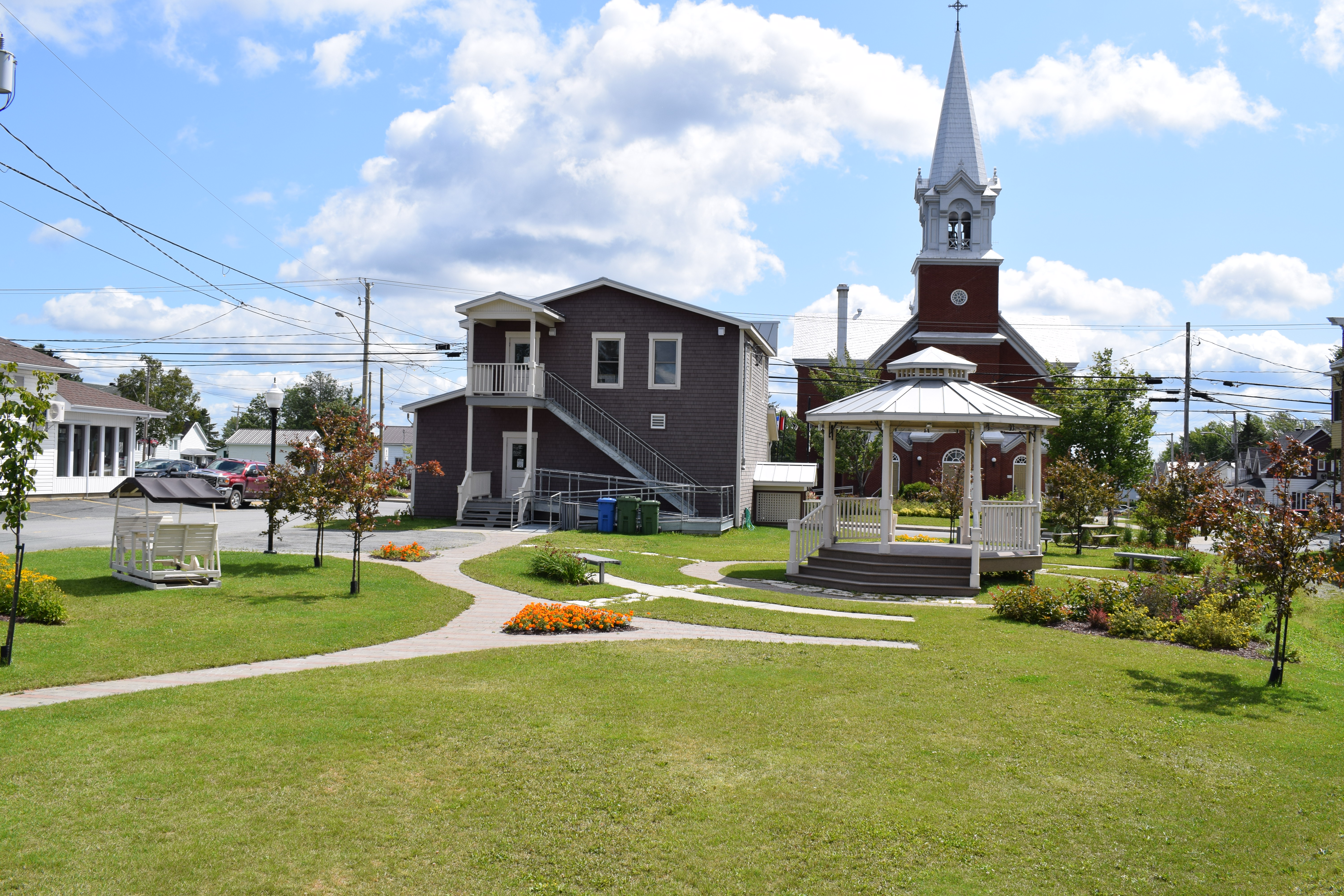

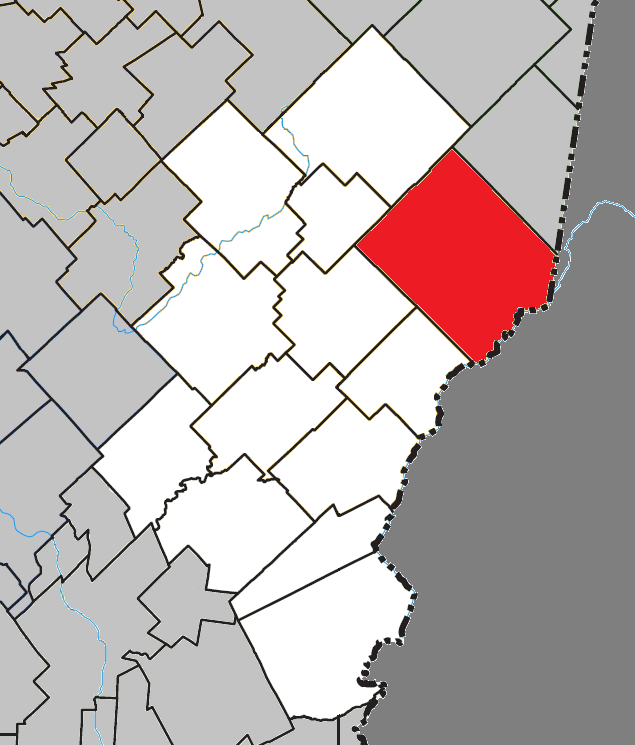
- Location within Les Etchemins RCM.

- Location in southern Quebec.
- Coordinates: 46°27′N 70°11′W
- Country: Canada
- Province: Quebec
- Region: Chaudière-Appalaches
- RCM: Les Etchemins
- Constituted: January 11, 1904
- Named for: Camillus de Lellis

Government
  - Mayor: Tom Lecle
  - Federal riding: Bellechasse—Les Etchemins—Lévis
  - Prov. riding: Bellechasse

Area
  - Total: 251.50 km^{2} (97.10 sq mi)
  - Land: 251.92 km^{2} (97.27 sq mi)
- There is an apparent contradiction between two authoritative sources

Population (2021)
  - Total: 737
  - Density: 2.93/km^{2} (7.58/sq mi)
  - Pop 2011-2021: ▼10.9%
  - Dwellings: 467
- Time zone: UTC−5 (EST)
  - Summer (DST): UTC−4 (EDT)
- Postal code(s): G0R 2S0
- Area codes: 418 and 581
- Highways: R-204; R-281
- Website: www.saint-camille.net

Saint-Camille-de-Lellis is a parish in the Les Etchemins Regional County Municipality in Quebec, Canada. It is part of the Chaudière-Appalaches region and the population is 737 as of the Canada 2021 Census. It is named after Saint Camillus de Lellis, but also commemorates Reverend Camille-Stanislas Brochu, first priest of the parish.

Saint-Camille-de-Lellis lies on the Canada–United States border.

== Demographics ==
In the 2021 Census of Population conducted by Statistics Canada, Saint-Camille-de-Lellis had a population of 737 living in 380 of its 458 total private dwellings, a change of −2% from its 2016 population of 752. With a land area of 251.93 km^{2} (97.27 sq mi), it had a population density of 2.9/km^{2} (7.6/sq mi) in 2021.

== See also ==
- Daaquam River, a stream
- Orignaux River (Black River), a stream
- Black River (Daaquam River), a stream
- Little River (Black River), a stream
- Southwest Branch of Saint-John River, a stream
- Les Etchemins Regional County Municipality (RCM)
