= Southwest Branch Saint John River =

Location
- Countries: Canada, United States
- States: Quebec, Maine

Physical characteristics
- Source
  - location: Little Saint John Lake (French: Petit lac Saint-Jean), Maine–Quebec border
  - coordinates: 46°06′19″N 70°15′09″W
  - elevation: 489 metres (1,604 ft)
- Mouth
  - location: Saint John River
  - coordinates: 46°33′46″N 69°53′06″W
  - elevation: 333 metres (1,093 ft)
- Length: 91.9 km (57.1 mi)

Basin features
- Tributaries
  - left: (from the mouth) In Maine: Carter Brook; in Quebec: Doucet Brook, Morning North Brook, Morning South Brook, discharge of Lac Croche, discharge of 3 unnamed little lakes, discharge of Giguère lake, discharge of Joli lake.
  - right: (from the mouth) In Maine: Knowles Brook, Doucie Brook, Little Southwest Branch, Dead brook.

The Southwest Branch Saint John River (French: Rivière Saint-Jean Sud-Ouest) is a 62.0-mile-long (99.8 km) river in Maine and Quebec. The branch originates in "Little Saint John Lake" (46°06′18″N 70°15′09″W) on the international boundary between Saint-Zacharie, Quebec and Seboomook Lake Township 5, Range 20, WELS. The branch forms the Canada–United States border as it flows northeasterly to a confluence with the Little Southwest Branch Saint John River in Seboomook Lake Township 9, Range 18, WELS. The Southwest Branch flows briefly into Quebec (46°24′58″N 70°03′24″W) and then through Maine to its confluence with the Baker Branch Saint John River in Seboomook Lake Township 9, Range 17, WELS. The Southwest Branch finally joins with the Northwest Branch to form the Saint John River.

== Geography ==
The "Southwest Branch Saint John River" rises at the mouth of the "Little Saint John Lake" (length: 1.0 kilometre (0.62 mi); height: 489 metres (1,604 ft)) which straddles the border between the Canada (Quebec, MRC Les Etchemins Regional County Municipality) and the United States (Maine, Somerset County, Maine). This lake which empties at the North is surrounded by mountains.

The "Little Saint John Lake" is located on the East side of the watershed line corresponding to the crest of surrounding mountains. The Metgermette North River (in Quebec) drains the Northwest side of this watershed slope. The West slope falls toward "Hurricane Pond" for which water empties on Southwest (Maine), through tributary "Hurricane Brook"; then the current runs down Southwest successively into Dole Brook and North Branch Penobscot River.

The mouth of the "Little Saint John Lake" is located on the Canada-US border:

- 2.2 kilometres (1.4 mi) south of the top of a mountain Maine, whose altitude is 578 metres (1,896 ft);
- 8.6 kilometres (5.3 mi) to the southeast from the village of Saint-Zacharie, Quebec;
- 20.7 kilometres (12.9 mi) north-east from the village of Armstrong in Saint-Théophile, Québec.

From the mouth of the "Little Lake St John", the "Saint John River West" runs on 91.9 kilometres (57.1 mi) of which 54.6 kilometres (33.9 mi) delimiting the Canada-US border in its upper part and then flows on 37.3 kilometres (23.2 mi) in the Maine. Its course describes the following segments:

Higher Courses of the "Southwest Branch Saint John River"(segment of 26.1 kilometres (16.2 mi) delimiting the Canada-US border)

- 2.5 kilometres (1.6 mi) Northward, up to a stream (from the West, i.e. from the North Metgermette Township, in Quebec);
- 0.8 kilometres (0.50 mi) Northward, up to a stream (from the East, i.e. from the Somerset County, Maine);
- 3.5 kilometres (2.2 mi) Northward, meandering up to a stream (from the Southeast);
- 9.6 kilometres (6.0 mi) (or 6.1 kilometres (3.8 mi) in direct line) to the northwest, winding up to the discharge of Lake Joli (from the West, i.e. from Quebec);
- 5.2 kilometres (3.2 mi) to the northeast, to the limit of the township of Langevin (municipality of Saint-Louis-de-Gonzague, Quebec;
- 4.5 kilometres (2.8 mi) to the Northeast, up to the discharge (from the West) of Lake Veilleux and Lake Croche.

Intermediate Course of the "Southwest Saint John River" (segment of 28.5 kilometres (17.7 mi) delimiting Canada-US border)

- 8.8 kilometres (5.5 mi) to the Northeast, up to Morning Creek South (from the Southwest);
- 1.0 kilometre (0.62 mi) to the Northeast, up to Morning Creek North (from Northwest);
- 3.3 kilometres (2.1 mi) to the Northeast snaking up to the limit of the Bellechasse Regional County Municipality, Quebec (township Daaquam);
- 4.8 kilometres (3.0 mi) to the Northeast, up to a stream (from the Northwest, i.e. from Saint-Camille-de-Lellis, Quebec);
- 6.6 kilometres (4.1 mi) (or 3.0 kilometres (1.9 mi) in direct line) to the Northeast, winding up to Doucet stream (from the Northwest, i.e. from Saint-Camille-de-Lellis, Quebec);
- 2.4 kilometres (1.5 mi) to the Northeast and winding up to "Little Southwest Branch" (French: "Petite branche Sud-Ouests" (from the South) i.e. from the township T8 R18 WELS of Maine);
- 1.6 kilometres (0.99 mi) to the Northeast up to the point where the "Southwest Branch Saint John River" ceases to serve as Canada-US border.

Lower course of the river, downstream of Canada-US border (segment of 21.4 kilometres (13.3 mi) flowing especially in Maine)

- 1.1 kilometres (0.68 mi) Northward, with a detour to the West in the Quebec, to return up to the US border;
- 5.8 kilometres (3.6 mi) to Northeast in the Maine up to Carter Creek (from the West, the RCM to be Montmagny Regional County Municipality in Quebec). Note: This stream flows mainly in Quebec and only 0.9 kilometres (0.56 mi) in Maine;
- 3.0 kilometres (1.9 mi) to the Northeast, up to a stream (from the West). Note: This stream drains a marsh area of the eastern part of the township of Panet, then flows over 2.1 kilometres (1.3 mi) in Maine;
- 4.0 kilometres (2.5 mi) to the Northeast, up to a stream (from the north);
- 7.5 kilometres (4.7 mi) to the southeast, up to the confluence of the Baker Branch Saint John River.

Lower course of the river, downstream of the Baker Branch Saint John River (segment 15.9 kilometres (9.9 mi) flowing especially in Maine)

- 2.4 kilometres (1.5 mi) eastward to the highway bridge;
- 6.0 kilometres (3.7 mi) to the Northeast, to Knowles stream (from the east);
- 7.5 kilometres (4.7 mi) to the northeast, to the confluence of the river

At its confluence, the "Southwest Branch Saint John River" joins the "Northwest Branch Saint John River" whose source is at the mouth of Lake Frontier, in Quebec. This junction of the confluence of the two rivers is the head of the Saint John River.

From the confluence of the "Southwest Branch Saint John River", the Saint John River flows to the East and Northeast through the Maine; then East and Southeast through the New Brunswick. The Saint John River flows on the North bank of the Bay of Fundy which opens to the Southwest to the Atlantic Ocean.

== Toponymy ==
The name "Southwest Branch Saint John River" derives from the name of its parent river, the Saint John River. The cardinal points integrated in the place-name distinguish the two main tributaries of the upper part of the Saint John River.

During his exploratory expedition of 1604 of the south coast of current New Brunswick, Samuel de Champlain named this river the Saint John River because it is consistent with the saint of the day in the calendar of Christendom.

In history, the current Southwest Branch Saint John River was commonly referred to as "Saint John River" (like the main stem), especially in an 1863 report of the surveyor Eugene Casgrain, describing the township of Daaquam. The editions of 1914 and 1925 of Dictionnaire des rivières et lacs de la province de Québec (Dictionary of rivers and lakes in the province of Quebec) refer to the hydronym of "St. John River".

The 1925 map of township Metgermette North indicates "St. John River West Branch" and that of Daaquam township of 1927. Subsequently, several maps and documents published refer to the cardinal point. The "Répertoire géographique du Québec" (English: Geographical Gazetteer of Quebec) of 1969 indicates "Rivière Saint-Jean" (English: Saint John River).

In 1975 the "Commission de toponymie du Québec" (Quebec Places Names Board) officially changed this hydronym to Rivière Saint-Jean Sud-Ouest (English: Southwest Branch Saint John River).

The place name Rivière Saint-Jean Sud-Ouest was formalized on December 2, 1975, by the Commission de toponymie du Québec (Quebec Names Board)

== See also ==
Media related to Category:International rivers of North America at Wikimedia Commons

- Saint-Zacharie, Quebec, a municipality of Quebec
- Saint-Louis-de-Gonzague, Chaudière-Appalaches, Quebec, a municipality of Quebec
- Saint-Camille-de-Lellis, Quebec, a municipality of Quebec
- Les Etchemins Regional County Municipality (RCM)
- Bellechasse Regional County Municipality (RCM)
- Somerset County, Maine
- Saint John River (Bay of Fundy)
- List of rivers of Maine
- List of rivers of Quebec
- List of rivers of Maine
