= Quebec Route 204 =

Highway in Quebec

Route 204

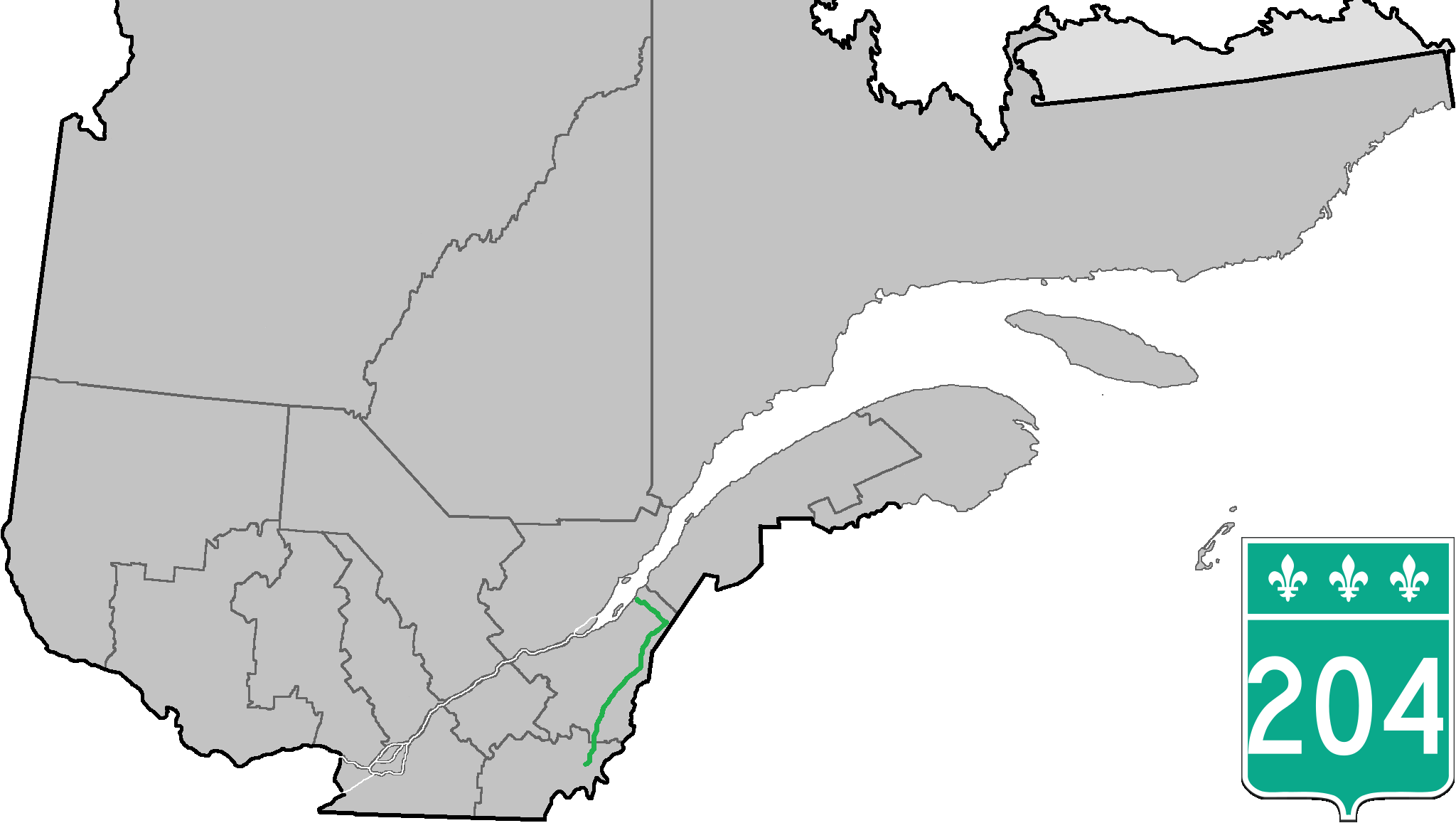

Route information
- Maintained by Transports Québec
- Length: 263.9 km (164.0 mi)

Major junctions
- West end: R-161 in Lac-Mégantic
- R-269 in Saint-Gédéon-de-Beauce; R-173 / R-271 in Saint-Georges; A-73 in Saint-Georges; R-275 in Saint-Prosper; R-277 in Sainte-Rose-de-Watford; R-281 in Saint-Camille-de-Lellis; R-283 in Saint-Just-de-Bretenières; R-285 in Saint-Aldabert; R-216 in Sainte-Perpetue; A-20 (TCH) in Saint-Jean-Port-Joli
- East end: R-132 in Saint-Jean-Port-Joli

Location
- Country: Canada
- Province: Quebec
- Major cities: Lac-Mégantic, Saint-Georges

Highway system
- Quebec provincial highways; Autoroutes; List; Former
← R-203	→ R-205

Route 204 is a two-lane east–west highway on the south shore of the Saint Lawrence River in Quebec. It is one of the longest secondary highways in the province. Its goes from in Saint-Jean-Port-Joli, at the junction of Route 132, in the east, to Lac-Mégantic, at the junction of Route 161, in the west. Although it is numbered as an east–west highway, the road follows a north–south course from Saint-Jean-Port-Joli to Saint-Pamphile, where it then mostly follows a southwest–northeast course until Saint-Georges. There, it crosses the Chaudière River and then follows it in a north–south course until its source, in Lake Mégantic, in Lac-Mégantic.

== Municipalities along Route 204 ==
- Lac-Mégantic
- Frontenac
- Audet
- Saint-Ludger
- Saint-Gédéon-de-Beauce
- Saint-Martin
- Saint-Georges
- Saint-Prosper
- Sainte-Rose-de-Watford
- Sainte-Justine
- Saint-Camille-de-Lellis
- Saint-Just-de-Bretenières
- Lac-Frontière
- Sainte-Lucie-de-Beauregard
- Saint-Adalbert
- Saint-Pamphile
- Sainte-Perpétue
- Tourville
- Saint-Damase-de-L'Islet
- Saint-Aubert
- Saint-Jean-Port-Joli
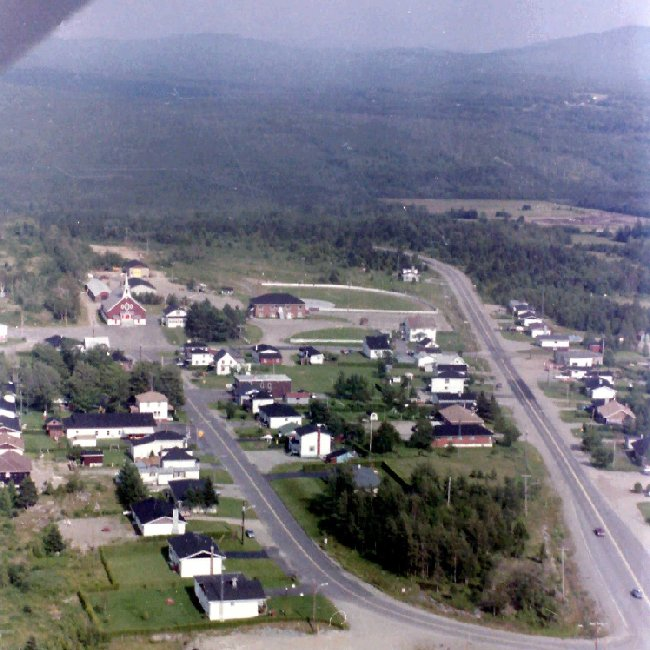
Route 204 bypasses Frontenac.

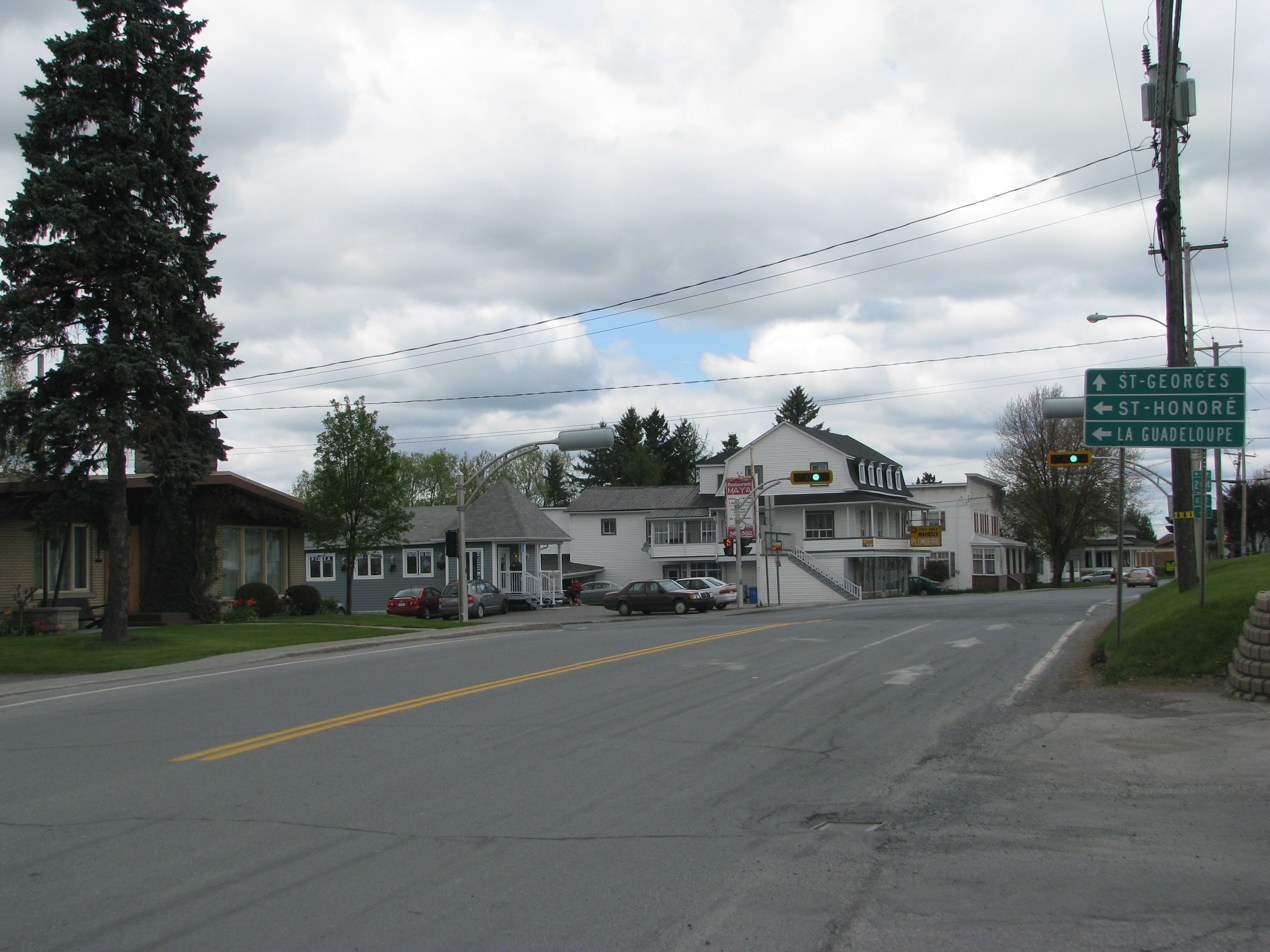
Route 204 in Saint-Martin, near route 269.

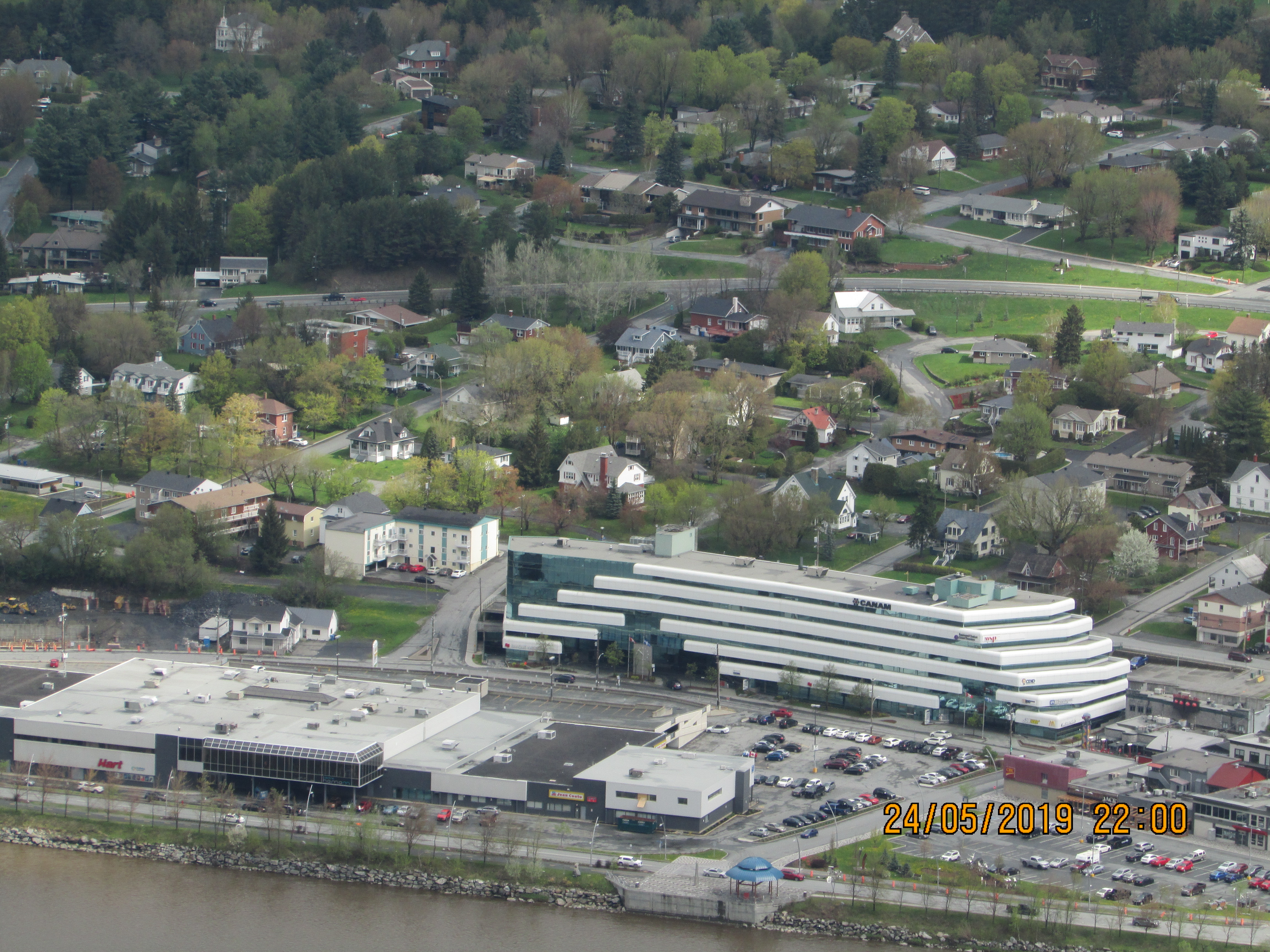
Downtown Saint-Georges with, in the background, Lacroix boulevard (routes 173 and 204) that bypasses it.

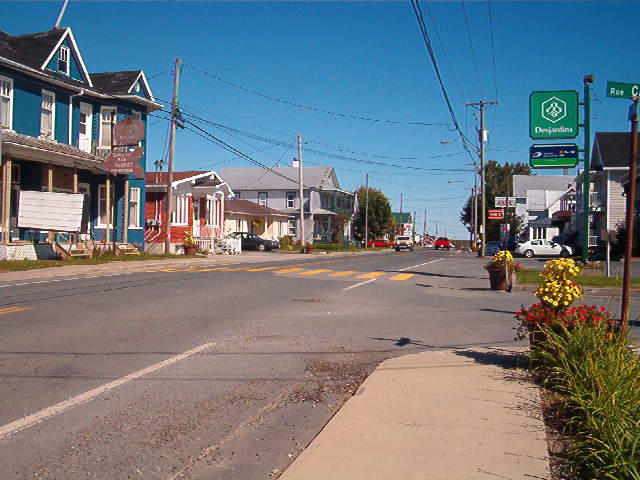
Route 204 in Saint-Camille.

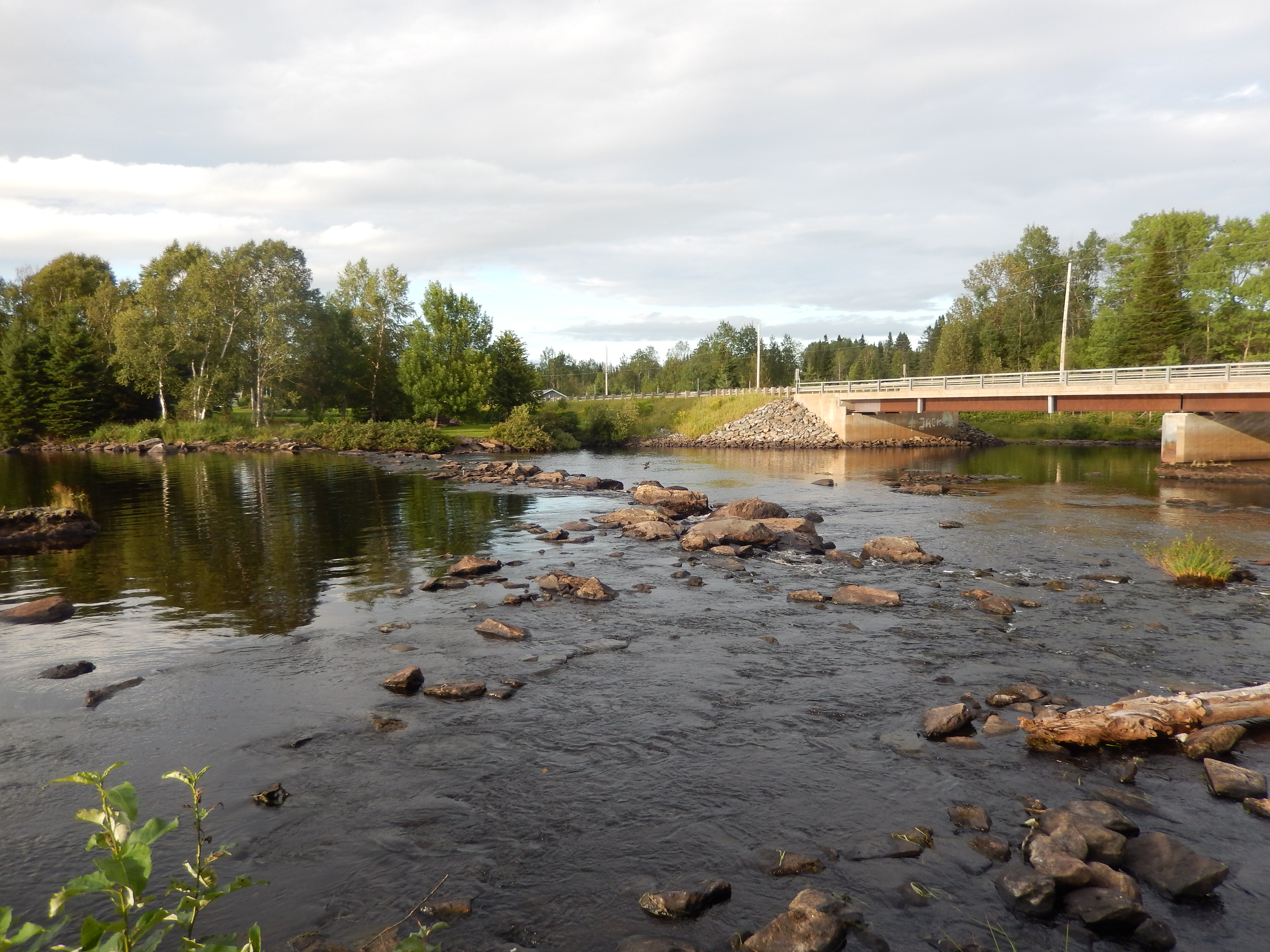
Bridge over Saint John River in Lac-Frontière.

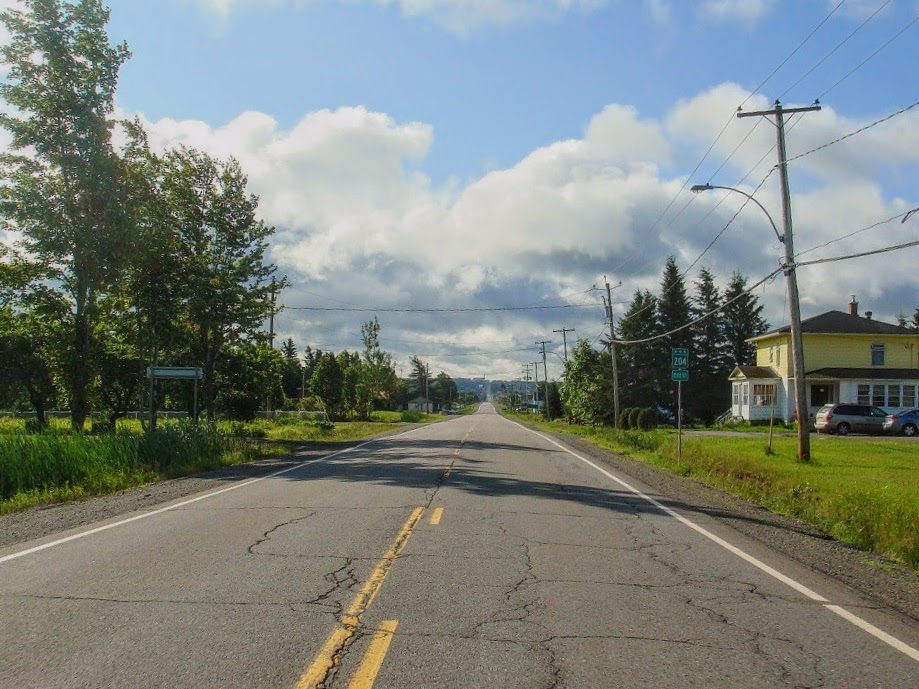
Route 204 leaving Tourville.

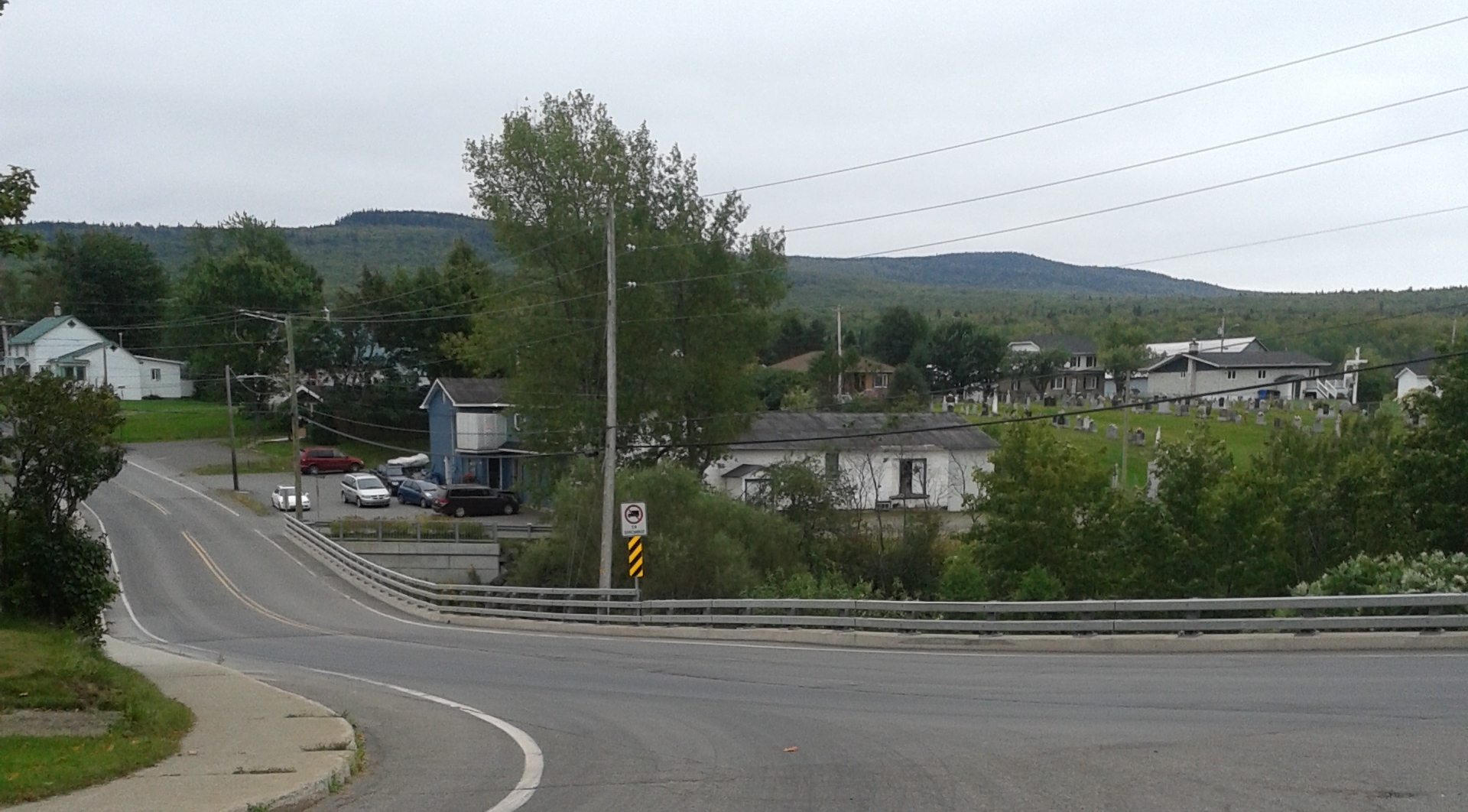
Bridge over Trois-Saumons river in Saint-Damase.

== Major intersections ==
RCM or ET	Municipality	Km	Junction	Notes
Western terminus of Route 204
Le Granit	Lac-Mégantic	0.0	R-161	161 SOUTH: to Frontenac; 161 NORTH: to Nantes
Le Granit	Audet	21.1	Chemin-du-Lac-Drolet	NORTH: to Lac-Drolet
Le Granit	Saint-Ludger	39.1	9e Rang	SOUTH: to Saint-Robert-Bellarmin
Beauce-Sartigan	Saint-Gédéon-de-Beauce	48.8	R-269 (Overlap 8.9 km)	269 SOUTH: to Saint-Théophile
Beauce-Sartigan	Saint-Martin	57.7	R-269 (Overlap 8.9 km)	269 NORTH: to Saint-Honoré-de-Shenley
Beauce-Sartigan	Saint-Georges	74.0	R-173 (Overlap 4.4 km)	173 SOUTH: to Saint-Côme–Linière
Beauce-Sartigan	Saint-Georges	77.2	R-271 (South end)	271 NORTH: to Saint-Benoît-Labre
Beauce-Sartigan	Saint-Georges	78.4	R-173 (Overlap 4.4 km)	173 NORTH: to Notre-Dame-des-Pins
Beauce-Sartigan	Saint-Georges		A-73 (South end)	73 NORTH: to Notre-Dame-des-Pins
Les Etchemins	Saint-Prosper	96.9	R-275	275 SOUTH: to Sainte-Aurélie; 275 NORTH: to Saint-Benjamin
Les Etchemins	Sainte-Rose-de-Watford	112.3; 117.4	R-277	277 SOUTH: to Saint-Louis-de-Gonzague; 277 NORTH: to Lac-Etchemin
Les Etchemins	Sainte-Justine	125.3	Route des Eglises	SOUTH: to Saint-Cyprien
Les Etchemins	Saint-Camille-de-Lellis	141.9	R-281 (South end)	281 NORTH: to Saint-Magloire
Montmagny	Saint-Just-de-Bretinieres	155.2	R-283	283 SOUTH: to Lac-Frontière
Montmagny	Saint-Just-de-Bretenières	159.3	R-283	283 NORTH: to Saint-Paul-de-Montminy
Montmagny	Sainte-Lucie-de-Beauregard	169.3	R-283 (South end)	283 NORTH: to Lac-Frontière
L'Islet	Saint-Adalbert	189.7	R-285 (South end)	285 NORTH: to Saint-Marcel
L'Islet	Sainte-Perpetue	221.7	R-216 (East end)	216 WEST: to Sainte-Félicité
L'Islet	Saint-Jean-Port-Joli	260.7; 261.2	A-20 (TCH)	20 EAST: to Saint-Roch-des-Aulnaies; 20 WEST: to L'Islet
L'Islet	Saint-Jean-Port-Joli	263.9	R-132	132 WEST: to L'Islet; 132 EAST: to Saint-Roch-des-Aulnaies
Eastern terminus of Route 204

== See also ==
- List of Quebec provincial highways
