= Saint-Fabien-de-Panet =

- Parish municipality
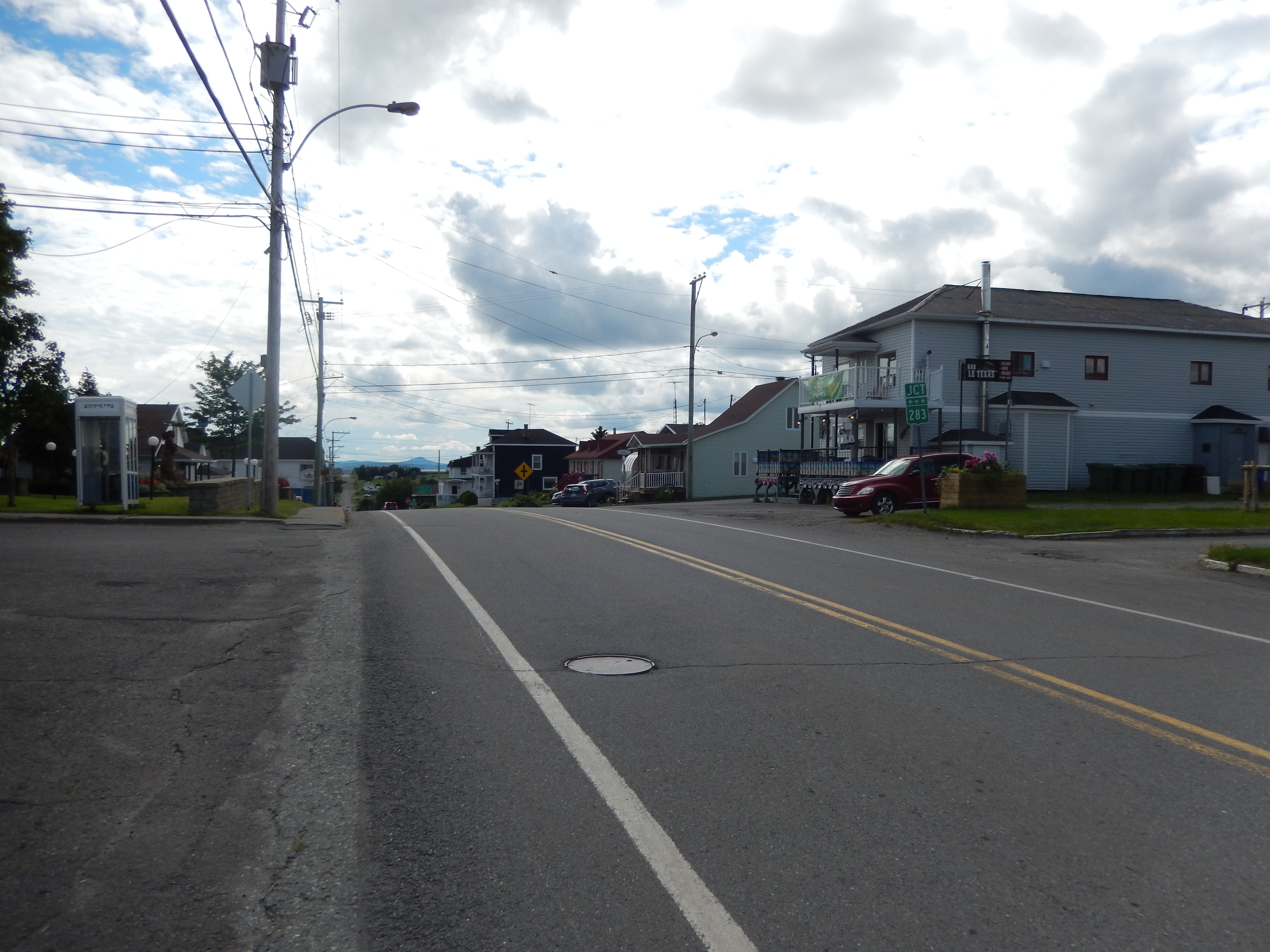

- Coat of arms

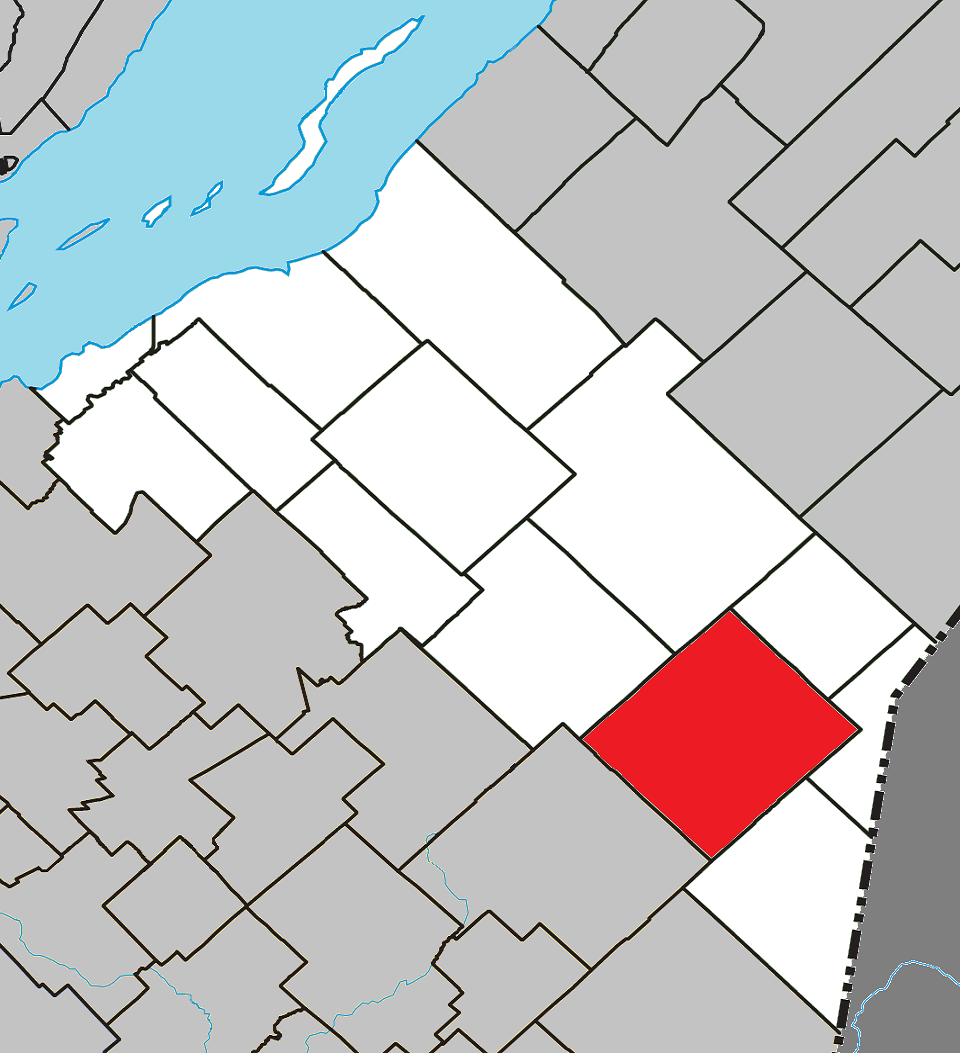
- Location within Montmagny RCM

- Location in province of Quebec
- Coordinates: 46°39′N 70°09′W
- Country: Canada
- Province: Quebec
- Region: Chaudière-Appalaches
- RCM: Montmagny
- Constituted: March 26, 1907

Government
  - Mayor: Laurent Laverdière
  - Fed. riding: Côte-du-Sud—Rivière-du-Loup—Kataskomiq—Témiscouata
  - Prov. riding: Côte-du-Sud

Area
  - Total: 188.53 km^{2} (72.79 sq mi)
  - Land: 187.01 km^{2} (72.20 sq mi)

Population (2021)
  - Total: 945
  - Density: 5.1/km^{2} (13/sq mi)
  - Pop (2016-21): ▼0.9%
  - Dwellings: 611
- Time zone: UTC−5 (EST)
  - Summer (DST): UTC−4 (EDT)
- Postal code(s): G0R 2J0
- Area codes: 418 and 581
- Highways: R-283
- Website: www.saintfabiendepanet.com

Saint-Fabien-de-Panet (French pronunciation: [sɛ̃ fabjɛ̃ də panɛ]) is a parish municipality in Quebec, Canada.

== History ==
In 1868, the geographic township of Panet was proclaimed, named after Bernard-Claude Panet, twelfth bishop of Quebec. To encourage colonization of the township, the government's Colonization Society No. 1 begun clearing lots in the 1870s, but did not immediately attract settlers. Settlement began at the end of the 19th century by people coming from Notre-Dame-Auxiliatrice-de-Buckland. By 1895, the first school was opened.

In 1901, the Mission of Saint-Théodore was founded, named in honour of Joseph-Théodore Mercier, then parish priest of Saint-Magloire. In 1904, the chapel was built and the parish was renamed to Saint-Fabien-de-Panet, in honour of Joseph-Fabien Dumais, who was parish priest of Saint-Magloire from 1901 to 1906. An influx of settlers from Saint-Ephrem, Saint-Paul, and Saint-Pierre led to quick growth of the community.

In 1908, the Parish Municipality of Saint-Fabien-de-Panet was established, taking its name from the mission, and with Alphonse Brisson as its first mayor.

In July 1948, the village was partially destroyed by fire. Shortly after, in 1948-1949, Saint-Fabien-de-Panet was connected to the electrical grid. At the same time, nickel was discovered just west of the village, leading to a period of prosperity for Saint-Fabien-de-Panet until the mine closed in the late 1950s.

== Demographics ==
In the 2021 Census of Population conducted by Statistics Canada, Saint-Fabien-de-Panet had a population of 945 living in 462 of its 611 total private dwellings, a change of −0.9% from its 2016 population of 954. With a land area of 187.01 km^{2} (72.20 sq mi), it had a population density of 5.1/km^{2} (13.1/sq mi) in 2021.

Historical census populations – Saint-Fabien-de-Panet

Year	Pop.	±%
1911	574	—
1921	1,039	+81.0%
1931	942	−9.3%
1941	1,417	+50.4%
1951	1,464	+3.3%
1956	1,654	+13.0%
1961	1,537	−7.1%

Year	Pop.	±%
1966	1,270	−17.4%
1971	1,126	−11.3%
1976	1,054	−6.4%
1981	1,067	+1.2%
1986	1,078	+1.0%
1991	985	−8.6%
1996	1,061	+7.7%

Year	Pop.	±%
2001	1,021	−3.8%
2006	1,057	+3.5%
2011	992	−6.1%
2016	954	−3.8%
2021	945	−0.9%

Population counts are not adjusted for boundary changes.
Source: Statistics Canada

== Local government ==
List of former mayors:

- Alphonse Brisson (1907)
- Ferdinand Corriveau (1907–1908, 1910–1911)
- Jean Mercier (1908–1910)
- Joseph Goulet (1911–1912)
- Édouard Farrell (1912–1914, 1921–1923)
- Alphonse Brochu (1914–1917)
- Pierre Doyon (1917–1919)
- J.-Cyprien Tanguay (1919–1921)
- Joseph Fortier (1923–1925)
- Jean Laflamme (1925–1929)
- Philippe Tardif (1929–1933, 1935–1937)
- Joseph Goulet (1933–1934)
- Alphonse Bilodeau (1934–1935)
- Hilaire Fortier (1937–1939)
- Joseph Chabot (1939–1940)
- Achille Guénard (1940–1948)
- Alfred Lemelin (1948–1958)
- Cajetan McNeil (1958–1963)
- Joseph E. Goulet (1963–1965)
- Eugène Guénard (1965–1965)
- Alyre Charbonneau (1965–1969, 1972–1975)
- Pierre Dion (1969–1972)
- Charles Bissonnette (1975–1977)
- Gérard Bélanger (1977–1978)
- Laurent Lapointe (1978–1982)
- Rita Lapointe (1982–1984)
- Pierre Thibaudeau (1984–2013)
- Claude Doyon (2013–2021)
- Laurent Laverdière (2021–present)

== Notable people ==
- Rosaire Bertrand, politician

== See also ==
- List of parish municipalities in Quebec
