= Lac-Frontière =

- Municipality
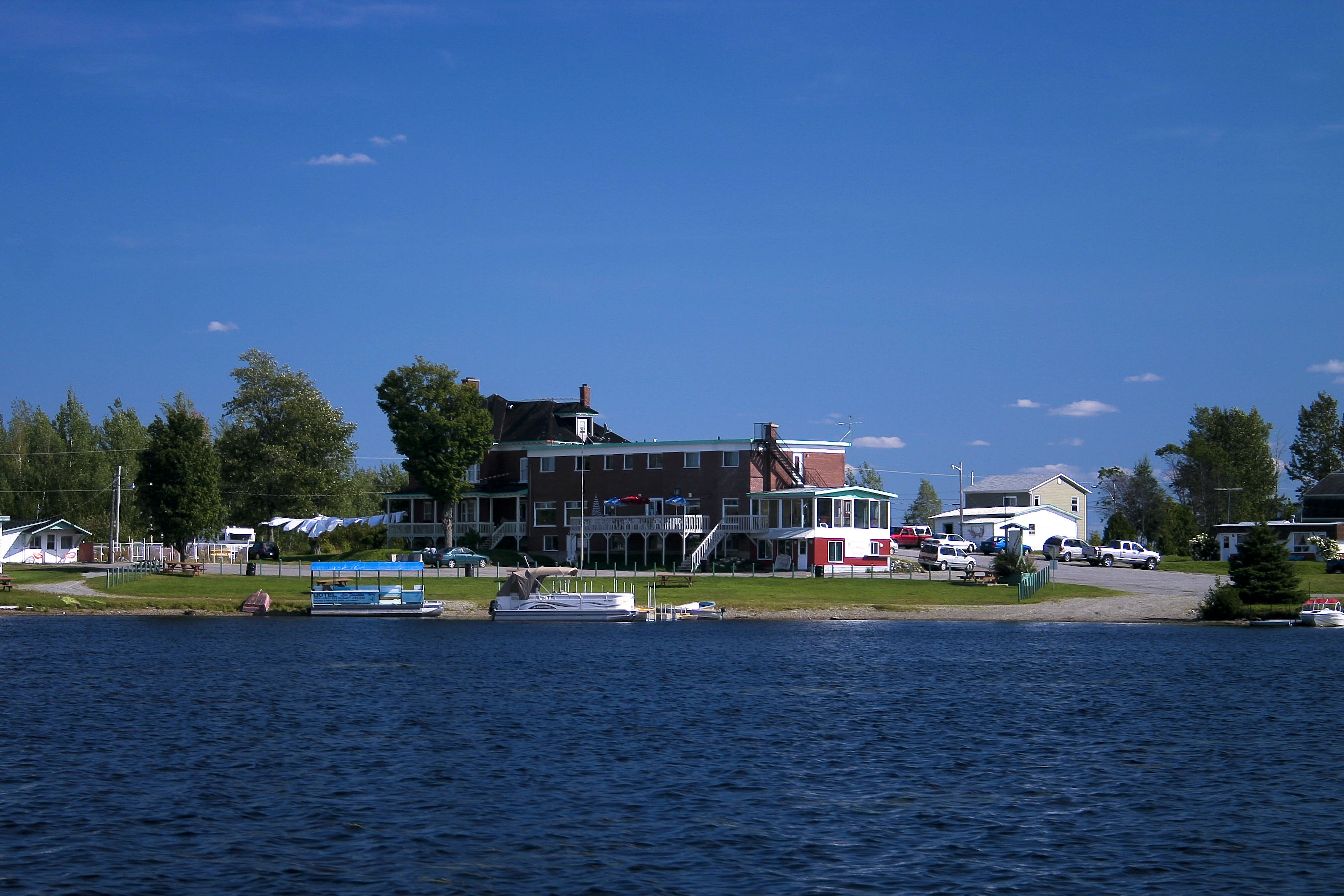

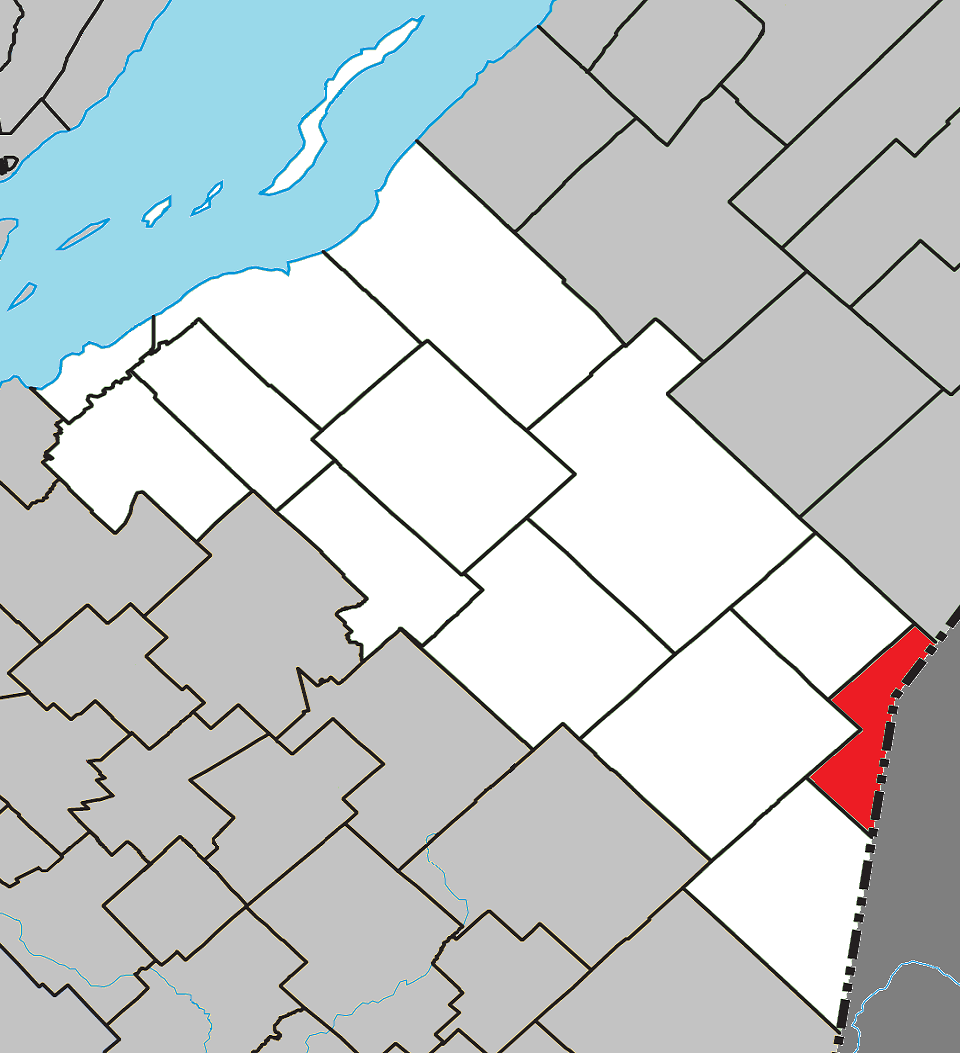
- Location within Montmagny RCM

- Location in province of Quebec
- Coordinates: 46°42′N 70°00′W
- Country: Canada
- Province: Quebec
- Region: Chaudière-Appalaches
- RCM: Montmagny
- Constituted: February 7, 1916

Government
  - Mayor: Sylvie Lapointe
  - Federal riding: Côte-du-Sud—Rivière-du-Loup—Kataskomiq—Témiscouata
  - Prov. riding: Côte-du-Sud

Area
  - Total: 51.69 km^{2} (19.96 sq mi)
  - Land: 49.96 km^{2} (19.29 sq mi)

Population (2021)
  - Total: 175
  - Density: 3.5/km^{2} (9.1/sq mi)
  - Pop (2016-21): ▼4.9%
  - Dwellings: 90
- Time zone: UTC−5 (EST)
  - Summer (DST): UTC−4 (EDT)
- Postal code(s): G0R 1T0
- Area codes: 418 and 581
- Highways: R-204
- Website: www.lac-frontiere.ca

Lac-Frontière (French pronunciation: [lak fʁɔ̃tjɛʁ]) is a municipality in Montmagny Regional County Municipality within the Chaudière-Appalaches region of Quebec, Canada. It is located at the border (frontière in French) with the United States.

== See also ==
- Northwest Branch Saint John River, a stream
- List of municipalities in Quebec
